= 1996 Oakland Raiders season =

NFL team season

- Owner: Al Davis
- General manager: Al Davis
- Head coach: Mike White
- Home stadium: Oakland–Alameda County Coliseum

Results
- Record: 7–9
- Division place: 4th AFC West
- Playoffs: Did not qualify
- Pro Bowlers: Tim Brown, WR; Steve Wisniewski, G Chester McGlockton, DT; Terry McDaniel, CB

The 1996 Oakland Raiders season was their 37th in the league. They were unable to improve upon their previous season's output of 8–8, winning only seven games. This was the team's third consecutive season in which they failed to qualify for the playoffs. Afterwards head coach Mike White was fired in only his second season. White had a 15–17 overall head coaching the Raiders.

== Offseason ==
=== NFL draft ===
1996 Oakland Raiders draft
Round	Pick	Player	Position	College	Notes
1	9	Rickey Dudley	Tight end	Ohio State	
2	57	Lance Johnstone	Defensive end	Temple	
5	166	La'Roi Glover *	Defensive tackle	San Diego State	
6	183	Tim Hall	Running back	Robert Morris	
7	220	Sedric Clark	Linebacker	Tulsa	
7	224	Darius Smith	Center	Sam Houston State	
7	248	Joey Wylie	Guard	Stephen F. Austin	
Made roster * Made at least one Pro Bowl during career

== Roster ==
1996 Oakland Raiders roster
Quarterbacks (QB): 9 Billy Joe Hobert; 15 Jeff Hostetler; 11 David Klingler; 10 Alfred Montez; Running backs (RB): 35 Joe Aska; 44 Derrick Fenner; 45 Tim Hall; 26 Napoleon Kaufman; 22 Harvey Williams; Wide receivers (WR): 81 Tim Brown; 80 Daryl Hobbs; 82 James Jett; 84 Kenny Shedd; 88 Olanda Truitt; Tight ends (TE): 83 Rickey Dudley; 87 Andrew Glover; 85 Marcus Hinton	Offensive linemen (OL): 68 Rick Cunningham G/T; 66 Kevin Gogan G; 75 Pat Harlow T; 64 Robert Jenkins T; 72 Lincoln Kennedy T; 73 Charles McRae G/T; 63 Barret Robbins C; 67 Dan Turk C; 76 Steve Wisniewski G; Defensive linemen (DL): 93 Jerry Ball DT; 99 Aundray Bruce DE; 92 La'Roi Glover DT; 74 Nolan Harrison DE/DT; 51 Lance Johnstone DE; 97 Russell Maryland DT; 91 Chester McGlockton DT; 94 Anthony Smith DE; 56 Pat Swilling DE	Linebackers (LB): 54 Greg Biekert MLB; 96 Paul Butcher MLB; 55 James Folston OLB; 57 Rob Holmberg OLB; 52 Mike Jones OLB; 50 Mike Morton OLB; Defensive backs (DB): 33 Eddie Anderson FS; 24 Larry Brown CB; 21 Darren Carrington FS; 20 Perry Carter CB; 46 Carl Kidd CB; 25 Dan Land FS; 29 Albert Lewis CB; 43 Lorenzo Lynch SS; 23 Lamar Lyons SS; 36 Terry McDaniel CB; Special teams (ST): 2 Leo Araguz P; 5 Cole Ford K	Practice squad: 14 Kenyan Branscomb WR; 48 Jerone Davison RB; 19 Sean Foster WR; 13 Ken Grace WR; 65 Joey Wylie G; Reserve: 53 Rob Fredrickson LB (IR); 7 Jeff Gossett P (IR); 79 Jeff Kysar T (IR); 77 Rich Stephens G/T (IR); 37 James Trapp CB (IR); Rookies in italics 53 active, 5 reserve, 5 practice squad

== Schedule ==
Week	Date	Opponent	Result	Record	Venue	Attendance
1	September 1	at Baltimore Ravens	**L** 14–19	0–1	Memorial Stadium	64,124
2	September 8	at **Kansas City Chiefs**	**L** 3–19	0–2	Arrowhead Stadium	79,281
3	September 15	Jacksonville Jaguars	**W** 17–3	1–2	Oakland–Alameda County Coliseum	46,291
4	September 22	**San Diego Chargers**	**L** 34–40	1–3	Oakland–Alameda County Coliseum	49,097
5	September 29	at Chicago Bears	**L** 17–19	1–4	Soldier Field	57,062
6	October 6	at New York Jets	**W** 34–13	2–4	Giants Stadium	63,611
7	October 13	Detroit Lions	**W** 37–21	3–4	Oakland–Alameda County Coliseum	50,037
8	October 21	at **San Diego Chargers**	**W** 23–14	4–4	Jack Murphy Stadium	62,350
9	Bye					
10	November 4	**Denver Broncos**	**L** 21–22	4–5	Oakland–Alameda County Coliseum	61,179
11	November 10	at Tampa Bay Buccaneers	**L** 17–20	4–6	Houlihan's Stadium	45,392
12	November 17	Minnesota Vikings	**L** 13–16	4–7	Oakland–Alameda County Coliseum	41,183
13	November 24	at **Seattle Seahawks**	**W** 27–21	5–7	Kingdome	47,506
14	December 1	Miami Dolphins	**W** 17–7	6–7	Oakland–Alameda County Coliseum	60,591
15	December 9	**Kansas City Chiefs**	**W** 26–7	7–7	Oakland–Alameda County Coliseum	57,082
16	December 15	at **Denver Broncos**	**L** 19–24	7–8	Mile High Stadium	75,466
17	December 22	**Seattle Seahawks**	**L** 21–28	7–9	Oakland–Alameda County Coliseum	33,455
Note: Intra-division opponents are in **bold** text.

=== Game summaries ===
==== Week 1: at Baltimore Ravens ====
Week 1: Oakland Raiders at Baltimore Ravens

Quarter	1	2	3	4	Total
Raiders	0	14	0	0	**14**
**Ravens**	7	0	6	6	**19**

at Memorial Stadium, Baltimore, Maryland

- Date: September 1, 1996
- Game time: 10:00 p.m. PST/1:00 p.m. EST
- Game weather: Overcast, 71 °F (22 °C)
- Game attendance: 64,124
- TV announcers (NBC): Tom Hammond, Bob Trumpy

Game information

**First quarter**

**Second quarter**

**Third quarter**

**Fourth quarter**

Top passers

- OAK – Billy Joe Hobert – 17/26, 192 yards, 2 TD, 2 INT
- BAL – Vinny Testaverde – 19/33, 254 yards

Top rushers

- OAK – Harvey Williams – 13 rushes, 39 yards
- BAL – Earnest Byner – 14 rushes, 43 yards, TD

Top receivers

- OAK – James Jett – 4 receptions, 65 yards
- BAL – Michael Jackson – 3 receptions, 60 yards

==== Week 2: at Kansas City Chiefs ====
Week 2: Oakland Raiders at Kansas City Chiefs – Game summary

Quarter	1	2	3	4	Total
Raiders	0	0	0	3	**3**
**Chiefs**	0	7	7	5	**19**

at Arrowhead Stadium, Kansas City, Missouri

- Date: September 8
- Game time: 12:00 p.m. CDT
- Game weather: Overcast, 73 °F (23 °C)
- Game attendance: 79,281
- Referee: Jerry Markbreit
- TV announcers (NBC): Dick Enberg, Paul Maguire, Phil Simms and Jim Gray
- Recap, Game Book

Game information

**First quarter**

- No scoring plays.

**Second quarter**

- KC – Tony Richardson 1-yard pass from Steve Bono (Pete Stoyanovich kick), 1:09. Chiefs 7–0. **Drive: 10 plays, 72 yards, 4:22.**

**Third quarter**

- KC – James Hasty 80-yard interception return (Pete Stoyanovich kick), 8:39. Chiefs 14–0.

**Fourth quarter**

- KC – Pete Stoyanovich 23-yard field goal, 13:39. Chiefs 17–0. **Drive: 9 plays, 49 yards, 5:20.**
- OAK – Cole Ford 38-yard field goal, 7:01. Chiefs 17–3. **Drive: 13 plays, 61 yards, 6:38.**
- KC – Barret Robbins tackled in end zone by Dan Saleaumua for a Safety, 3:12. Chiefs 19–3.

**Top passers**

- OAK – Billy Joe Hobert – 19/40, 181 yards, INT
- KC – Steve Bono – 11/19, 135 yards, TD

**Top rushers**

- OAK – Napoleon Kaufman – 8 rushes, 69 yards
- KC – Greg Hill – 7 rushes, 50 yards

**Top receivers**

- OAK – Tim Brown – 8 receptions, 96 yards
- KC – Danan Hughes – 3 receptions, 45 yards

==== Week 3: vs Jacksonville Jaguars ====
Week Three: Jacksonville Jaguars at Oakland Raiders – Game summary

Quarter	1	2	3	4	Total
Jaguars	0	0	3	0	**3**
**Raiders**	0	10	0	7	**17**

at Oakland-Alameda County Coliseum, Oakland, California

- Date: September 15, 1996
- Game time: 4:00 p.m. EDT
- Game weather: 67 °F (19 °C)
- Game attendance: 46,291
- Referee: Red Cashion
- Recap, Game Book

Game information

**First quarter**

- No scoring plays.

**Second quarter**

- OAK – Tim Brown 19-yard pass from Jeff Hostetler (Cole Ford kick), 5:46. Raiders 7–0. **Drive: 4 plays, 55 yards, 2:00.**
- OAK – Cole Ford 32-yard field goal, 0:58. Raiders 10–0. **Drive: 9 plays, 36 yards, 2:48.**

**Third quarter**

- JAX – Mike Hollis 33-yard field goal, 4:40. Raiders 10–3. **Drive: 6 plays, 27 yards, 2:48.**

**Fourth quarter**

- OAK – Jerry Ball 66-yard interception return (Cole Ford kick), 2:15. Raiders 17–3.

Top passers

- JAX – Mark Brunell – 18/37, 217 yards, 2 INT
- HOU – Jeff Hostetler – 18/27, 200 yards, TD, 2 INT

Top rushers

- JAX – James Stewart – 8 rushes, 52 yards
- HOU – Napoleon Kaufman – 7 rushes, 54 yards

Top receivers

- JAX – Keenan McCardell – 4 receptions, 72 yards
- HOU – Tim Brown – 5 receptions, 60 yards, TD

==== Week 4: vs San Diego Chargers ====
Week Four: San Diego Chargers at Oakland Raiders – Game summary

Quarter	1	2	3	4	Total
Chargers	21	6	0	13	**40**
Raiders	0	14	7	13	**34**

at Oakland-Alameda County Coliseum, Oakland, California

- Date: September 22
- Game time: 1:00 p.m. PDT
- Game weather: 62 °F (16.7 °C), relative humidity 74%, wind 11 mph
- Game attendance: 49,097
- Referee: Bernie Kukar
- TV announcers (NBC): Charlie Jones and Randy Cross
- Box score

Game information

**First quarter**

- SDG – Terrell Fletcher 6-yard pass from Stan Humphries (John Carney kick), 4:03. Chargers 7–0. **Drive: 5 plays, 27 yards, 2:04.**
- SDG – Tony Martin 7-yard pass from Stan Humphries (John Carney kick), 3:05. Chargers 14–0. **Drive: 2 plays, 11 yards, 0:40.**
- SDG – Tony Martin 41-yard pass from Stan Humphries (John Carney kick), 0:58. Chargers 21–0. **Drive: 1 play, 41 yards, 0:06.**

**Second quarter**

- OAK – Derrick Fenner 4-yard pass from Jeff Hostetler (Cole Ford kick), 14:11. Chargers 21–7. **Drive: 5 plays, 60 yards, 1:47.**
- SDG – John Carney 28-yard field goal, 9:21. Chargers 24–7. **Drive: 10 plays, 70 yards, 4:50.**
- OAK – Rickey Dudley 6-yard pass from Jeff Hostetler (Cole Ford kick), 7:11. Chargers 24–14. **Drive: 4 plays, 80 yards, 2:10.**
- SDG – John Carney 39-yard field goal, 1:04. Chargers 27–14. **Drive: 5 plays, 34 yards, 1:17.**

**Third quarter**

- OAK – Tim Brown 6-yard pass from Jeff Hostetler (Cole Ford kick), 5:41. Chargers 27–21. **Drive: 13 plays, 63 yards, 5:39.**

**Fourth quarter**

- SDG – Tony Martin 19-yard pass from Stan Humphries (run failed), 8:04. Chargers 33–21. **Drive: 14 plays, 80 yards, 6:56.**
- SDG – Willie Clark 83-yard interception return (John Carney kick), 3:40. Chargers 40–21.
- OAK – Tim Brown 11-yard pass from Billy Joe Hobert (passed failed), 1:29. Chargers 40–27. **Drive: 8 plays, 79 yards, 2:11.**
- OAK – Kenny Shedd 28-yard pass from Billy Joe Hobert (Cole Ford kick), 0:12. Chargers 40–34. **Drive: 7 plays, 57 yards, 1:17.**

**Top passers**

- SDG – Stan Humphries – 18/25, 226 yards, 4 TD
- OAK – Jeff Hostetler – 26/44, 293 yards, 3 TD, 2 INT

**Top rushers**

- SDG – Leonard Russell – 19 rushes, 63 yards
- OAK – Napoleon Kaufman – 7 rushes, 116 yards

**Top receivers**

- SDG – Tony Martin – 10 receptions, 138 yards, 3 TD
- OAK – Tim Brown – 11 receptions, 120 yards, 2 TD

==== Week 6 at New York Jets ====
Week Six: Oakland Raiders (1–4) at New York Jets (0–5)

Quarter	1	2	3	4	Total
**Raiders**	0	13	0	21	**34**
Jets	0	3	3	7	**13**

at Giants Stadium, East Rutherford, New Jersey

- Date: October 6
- Game time: 1:00 p.m. EST
- Game weather: 53 °F (12 °C)
- Game attendance: 63,611
- TV: NBC
- Box Score, Box Score

Game information

**First quarter**

- No scoring

**Second quarter**

- OAK – Cole Ford 26-yard field goal, 13:04. Raiders 3–0. Drive:
- NYJ – Nick Lowery 43-yard field goal, 11:23. Tie 3–3. Drive:
- OAK – Rickey Dudley 23-yard pass from Jeff Hostetler (Cole Ford kick), 6:43. Raiders 10–3. Drive:
- OAK – Cole Ford 35-yard field goal, 0:21. Raiders 13–3. Drive:

**Third quarter**

- NYJ – Nick Lowery 24-yard field goal, 10:11. Raiders 13–6. Drive:

**Fourth quarter**

- OAK – Daryl Hobbs 3-yard pass from Jeff Hostetler (Cole Ford kick), 14:25. Raiders 20–6. Drive:
- OAK – Rickey Dudley 2-yard pass from Jeff Hostetler (Cole Ford kick), 7:25. Raiders 27–6. Drive:
- NYJ – Alex Van Dyke 3-yard pass from Frank Reich (Nick Lowery kick), 3:48. Raiders 27–13. Drive:
- OAK – Joe Aska 30-yard run (Cole Ford kick), 3:20. Raiders 34–13. Drive:

Top passers

- OAK – Jeff Hostetler – 17/28, 188 yards, 3 TD, INT
- NYJ – Frank Reich – 15/31, 177 yards, TD, 2 INT

Top rushers

- OAK – Joe Aska – 21 rushes, 136 yards, TD
- NYJ – Adrian Murrell – 20 rushes, 102 yards

Top receivers

- OAK – Rickey Dudley – 4 receptions, 60 yards, 2 TD
- NYJ – Henry Bailey – 3 receptions, 42 yards

==== Week 8: at San Diego Chargers ====
Week Eight: Oakland Raiders at San Diego Chargers – Game summary

Quarter	1	2	3	4	Total
Raiders	7	3	10	3	**23**
Chargers	7	0	0	7	**14**

at Jack Murphy Stadium, San Diego, California

- Date: October 21
- Game time: 6:00 p.m. PDT
- Game weather: 66 °F (18.9 °C), relative humidity 54%, wind 7 mph
- Game attendance: 62,350
- Referee: Ron Blum
- TV announcers (ABC): Al Michaels, Frank Gifford and Dan Dierdorf
- Box score

Game information

**First quarter**

- OAK – Napoleon Kaufman 12 yard-run (Cole Ford kick), 11:59. Raiders 7–0. **Drive: 6 plays, 57 yards, 2:26.**
- SDG – Tony Martin 11-yard pass from Sean Salisbury (John Carney kick), 0:03. Tied 7–7. **Drive: 10 plays, 72 yards, 5:30.**

**Second quarter**

- OAK – Cole Ford 36-yard field goal, 11:27. Raiders 10–7. **Drive: 8 plays, 40 yards, 3:36.**

**Third quarter**

- OAK – Derrick Fenner 17-yard pass from Jeff Hostetler (Cole Ford kick), 8:02. Raiders 17–7. **Drive: 8 plays, 65 yards, 5:01.**
- OAK – Cole Ford 32-yard field goal, 3:12. Raiders 20–7. **Drive: 6 plays, 3 yards, 3:52.**

**Fourth quarter**

- SDG – Tony Martin 12-yard pass from Sean Salisbury (John Carney kick), 13:05. Raiders 20–14. **Drive: 13 plays, 79 yards, 5:07.**
- OAK – Cole Ford 34-yard field goal, 2:11. Raiders 23–14. **Drive: 5 plays, 3 yards, 1:42.**

**Top passers**

- OAK – Jeff Hostetler – 20/33, 191 yards, TD, INT
- SDG – Sean Salisbury – 22/35, 252 yards, 2 TD, INT

**Top rushers**

- OAK – Napoleon Kaufman – 3 rushes, 56 yards, TD
- SDG – Leonard Russell – 13 rushes, 19 yards

**Top receivers**

- OAK – Tim Brown – 5 receptions, 68 yards, 2 TD
- SDG – Tony Martin – 5 receptions, 81 yards, 2 TD

==== Week 15: vs Kansas City Chiefs ====
Week 15: Kansas City Chiefs at Oakland Raiders – Game summary

Quarter	1	2	3	4	Total
Chiefs	0	0	0	7	**7**
**Raiders**	10	0	16	0	**26**

at Oakland–Alameda County Coliseum, Oakland, California

- Date: December 9
- Game time: 8:00 p.m. CST/6:00 p.m. PST
- Game weather: Overcast, rainy skies, 57 °F (14 °C)
- Game attendance: 57,082
- Referee: Red Cashion
- TV announcers (ABC): Al Michaels, Frank Gifford, Dan Dierdorf and Lynn Swann
- Recap, Game Book

Game information

**First quarter**

- OAK – Andrew Glover 1-yard pass from Jeff Hostetler (Cole Ford kick), 6:59. Raiders 7–0. **Drive: 3 plays, 46 yards, 1:35.**
- OAK – Cole Ford 43-yard field goal, 3:47. Raiders 10–0. **Drive: 4 plays, 4 yards, 0:57.**

**Second quarter**

- No scoring plays.

**Third quarter**

- OAK – Penalty on Rich Gannon enforced in end zone for a Safety, 14:33. Raiders 12–0.
- OAK – Derrick Fenner 23-yard pass from Jeff Hostetler (Cole Ford kick), 4:31. Raiders 19–0. **Drive: 6 plays, 98 yards, 3:42.**
- OAK – Tim Brown 34-yard pass from Jeff Hostetler (Cole Ford kick), 0:52. Raiders 26–0. **Drive: 7 plays, 57 yards, 2:27.**

**Fourth quarter**

- KC – Sean LaChapelle 12-yard pass from Rich Gannon (Pete Stoyanovich kick), 14:23. Raiders 26–7. **Drive: 7 plays, 43 yards, 1:29.**

**Top passers**

- KC – Rich Gannon – 12/33, 88 yards, TD, INT
- OAK – Jeff Hostetler – 13/27, 150 yards, 3 TD

**Top rushers**

- KC – Marcus Allen – 14 rushes, 64 yards
- OAK – Napoleon Kaufman – 8 rushes, 109 yards

**Top receivers**

- KC – Sean LaChapelle – 2 receptions, 31 yards, TD
- OAK – Tim Brown – 3 receptions, 67 yards, TD

== Standings ==
AFC West
	W	L	T	PCT	PF	PA	STK
^{(1)} Denver Broncos	13	3	0	.813	391	275	L1
Kansas City Chiefs	9	7	0	.563	297	300	L3
San Diego Chargers	8	8	0	.500	310	376	W1
Oakland Raiders	7	9	0	.438	340	293	L2
Seattle Seahawks	7	9	0	.438	317	376	W1
