= 1996 New York Jets season =

1996 season of NFL team New York Jets; worst record in franchise history

- Owner: Leon Hess
- Head coach: Rich Kotite
- Offensive coordinator: Ron Erhardt
- Defensive coordinator: Jim Vechiarella
- Home stadium: The Meadowlands

Results
- Record: 1–15
- Division place: 5th AFC East
- Playoffs: Did not qualify
- Pro Bowlers: None

The 1996 New York Jets season was the franchise's 27th season in the National Football League (NFL) and the 37th overall. They failed to improve upon its league-worst 3–13 record from 1995 as they finished 1–15, which is the worst record in franchise history. As a result, head coach Rich Kotite stepped down before the season ended.

The Jets tied an NFL record that the New Orleans Saints set in 1980 and became the fifth team and first since the 1991 Indianapolis Colts to finish a season with fifteen losses. The record would be equaled by the 2000 San Diego Chargers, 2001 Carolina Panthers, and the 2007 Miami Dolphins before the 2008 Detroit Lions eclipsed it by becoming the first team to go through a sixteen-game season without a single victory.

== Offseason ==
After three seasons with quarterback Boomer Esiason as the starter, the Jets decided to go in a different direction and released Esiason in the offseason. They signed Neil O'Donnell, who had just led the Pittsburgh Steelers to the Super Bowl, to replace him in the hopes he would duplicate his success with the Steelers. The Jets received the first pick in the NFL draft in April and drafted wide receiver Keyshawn Johnson out of the University of Southern California. The Jets also signed offensive tackles Jumbo Elliott and David Williams and receivers Jeff Graham and Webster Slaughter. The Jets spent $70 million in the offseason on free-agent and rookie contracts.

Additions	Subtractions
QB Neil O'Donnell (Steelers)	QB Boomer Esiason (Cardinals)
QB Frank Reich (Panthers)	T James Brown (Dolphins)
RB Reggie Cobb (Jaguars)	TE Johnny Mitchell (Dolphins)
T Jumbo Elliott (Giants)	FS Anthony Prior (Vikings)
G Harry Galbreath (Packers)	
WR Jeff Graham (Bears)	
WR Webster Slaughter (Chiefs)	

=== NFL draft ===
1996 New York Jets draft
Round	Pick	Player	Position	College	Notes
1	1	Keyshawn Johnson *	Wide receiver	USC	
2	31	Alex Van Dyke	Wide receiver	Nevada	
3	62	Ray Mickens	Cornerback	Texas A&M	
5	133	Marcus Coleman	Cornerback	Texas Tech	
6	168	Hugh Hunter	Defensive end	Hampton	
7	210	Chris Hayes	Safety	Washington State	
Made roster * Made at least one Pro Bowl during career

== Personnel ==
=== Staff/coaches ===
1996 New York Jets staff
Front office: Owner – Leon Hess; Team president & CEO - Steve Gutman; General manager - Rich Kotite	Coaching staff: Head coach - Rich Kotite; Offensive coaches: Offensive coordinator - Ron Erhardt; Wide receivers Coach - Richard Mann; Offensive line Coach - Bill Muir; Running backs - Dick Wood; Tight ends - Pat Hodgson	Defensive coaches: Defensive coordinator - Jim Vechiarella; Defensive line Coach - Ray Hamilton; Defensive backs - Peter Giunta; Quality control /defensive Assistant Coach - Tom Gamble; Scouting department: Assistant scout - Todd Haley

=== Roster ===
1996 New York Jets roster
Quarterbacks (QB): 4 Glenn Foley; 14 Neil O'Donnell; 10 John Paci; 7 Frank Reich; Running backs (RB): 20 Richie Anderson; 28 Reggie Cobb KR; 27 Lou D'Agostino FB; 33 Ronald Moore; 29 Adrian Murrell; Wide receivers (WR): 85 Henry Bailey KR; 80 Wayne Chrebet PR; 81 Jeff Graham; 19 Keyshawn Johnson; 87 Webster Slaughter; 86 Alex Van Dyke KR; Tight ends (TE): 84 Fred Baxter; 88 Kyle Brady; 83 Tyrone Davis	Offensive linemen (OL): 69 Harry Boatswain G/T; 62 Roger Duffy C/G; 76 Jumbo Elliott T; 68 Dave Fiore G; 64 Harry Galbreath G; 75 Siupeli Malamala T; 70 Matt O'Dwyer G; 60 Casey Wiegmann C; 73 David Williams T; Defensive linemen (DL): 94 Matt Brock DT; 71 Mike Chalenski DE; 99 Hugh Douglas DE; 98 Mark Gunn DE/DT; 92 Bobby Hamilton DE; 93 Marc Spindler DT; 97 Marvin Washington DT	Linebackers (LB): 58 Aubrey Beavers OLB; 53 Chad Cascadden OLB; 59 Kyle Clifton MLB; 56 Rick Hamilton MLB; 55 Bobby Houston OLB; 54 Marvin Jones MLB; Defensive backs (DB): 38 Lance Brown CB/S; 42 Marcus Coleman CB; 31 Aaron Glenn CB; 21 Victor Green SS; 22 Carl Greenwood CB; 25 Gary Jones FS; 24 Ray Mickens CB; 44 Lonnie Young SS; 23 Eric Zomalt FS; Special teams (ST): 8 Nick Lowery K; 11 Brian Hansen P; 65 John Hudson LS; 5 Don Silvestri K	Practice squad: 47 Brian Gaine TE; 95 Brad Keeney DT; 53 Chip Daniels DT; 63 Troy Stark T; Reserve: 72 David Alexander C (IR); 78 Lou Benfatti DT (IR); 74 Erik Howard DT (IR); 57 Mo Lewis LB (IR); 51 Eddie Mason LB (IR); Rookies in italics 53 active, 5 reserve, 4 practice squad

== Season ==
O'Donnell was the starter for the first six games of the season, but they went 0–6 under him. He suffered a season-ending shoulder injury during pregame warmups before the seventh game. Longtime Buffalo Bills backup quarterback Frank Reich replaced him, but he didn't fare much better. They lost to Jacksonville and Buffalo, before the now lowly 0–8 Jets beat former Jets QB Boomer Esiason and his new team, the Arizona Cardinals (although Esiason didn't play for Arizona in that game), at Sun Devil Stadium for what would become their only win of the season in their first game against the Cardinals since 1978. Kotite announced his resignation on December 20.

=== Schedule ===
Week	Date	Opponent	Result	Record	Venue	Attendance
1	September 1	at Denver Broncos	**L** 6–31	0–1	Mile High Stadium	70,595
2	September 8	**Indianapolis Colts**	**L** 7–21	0–2	Giants Stadium	63,534
3	September 15	at **Miami Dolphins**	**L** 27–36	0–3	Pro Player Stadium	68,137
4	September 22	New York Giants	**L** 6–13	0–4	Giants Stadium	58,339
5	September 29	at Washington Redskins	**L** 16–31	0–5	Robert F. Kennedy Memorial Stadium	52,068
6	October 6	Oakland Raiders	**L** 13–34	0–6	Giants Stadium	63,611
7	October 13	at Jacksonville Jaguars	**L** 17–21	0–7	Alltel Stadium	65,699
8	October 20	**Buffalo Bills**	**L** 22–25	0–8	Giants Stadium	49,775
9	October 27	at Arizona Cardinals	**W** 31–21	1–8	Sun Devil Stadium	28,088
10	Bye					
11	November 10	**New England Patriots**	**L** 27–31	1–9	Giants Stadium	61,843
12	November 17	at **Indianapolis Colts**	**L** 29–34	1–10	RCA Dome	48,322
13	November 24	at **Buffalo Bills**	**L** 10–35	1–11	Rich Stadium	60,854
14	December 1	Houston Oilers	**L** 10–35	1–12	Giants Stadium	21,731
15	December 8	at **New England Patriots**	**L** 10–34	1–13	Foxboro Stadium	54,621
16	December 14	Philadelphia Eagles	**L** 20–21	1–14	Giants Stadium	29,176
17	December 22	**Miami Dolphins**	**L** 28–31	1–15	Giants Stadium	49,933
Note: Intra-division opponents are in **bold** text.

=== Game summaries ===
==== Week 6: vs. Oakland Raiders ====
Week Six: Oakland Raiders at New York Jets – Game summary

Quarter	1	2	3	4	Total
**Raiders**	0	13	0	21	**34**
Jets	0	3	3	7	**13**

at Giants Stadium, East Rutherford, New Jersey

- Date: October 6
- Game time: 1:00 p.m. EDT
- Game weather: 53 °F (12 °C)
- Game attendance: 63,611
- TV: NBC
- Box score, Box score

Game information

**First quarter**

- No scoring

**Second quarter**

- OAK – Cole Ford 26-yard field goal, 13:04. Raiders 3–0.
- NYJ – Nick Lowery 43-yard field goal, 11:23. Tie 3–3.
- OAK – Rickey Dudley 23-yard pass from Jeff Hostetler (Cole Ford kick), 6:43. Raiders 10–3.
- OAK – Cole Ford 35-yard field goal, 0:21. Raiders 13–3.

**Third quarter**

- NYJ – Nick Lowery 24-yard field goal, 10:11. Raiders 13–6.

**Fourth quarter**

- OAK – Daryl Hobbs 3-yard pass from Jeff Hostetler (Cole Ford kick), 14:25. Raiders 20–6.
- OAK – Rickey Dudley 2-yard pass from Jeff Hostetler (Cole Ford kick), 7:25. Raiders 27–6.
- NYJ – Alex Van Dyke 3-yard pass from Frank Reich (Nick Lowery kick), 3:48. Raiders 27–13.
- OAK – Joe Aska 30-yard run (Cole Ford kick), 3:20. Raiders 34–13.

Top passers

- OAK – Jeff Hostetler – 17/28, 188 yards, 3 TD, INT
- NYJ – Frank Reich – 15/31, 177 yards, TD, 2 INT

Top rushers

- OAK – Joe Aska – 21 rushes, 136 yards, TD
- NYJ – Adrian Murrell – 20 rushes, 102 yards

Top receivers

- OAK – Rickey Dudley – 4 receptions, 60 yards, 2 TD
- NYJ – Henry Bailey – 3 receptions, 42 yards

==== Week 9: at Arizona Cardinals ====
Week Nine: New York Jets at Arizona Cardinals – Game summary

Quarter	1	2	3	4	Total
**Jets**	3	14	0	14	**31**
Cardinals	0	0	14	7	**21**

at Sun Devil Stadium, Tempe, Arizona

- Date: October 27
- Game time: 4:00 p.m. EST/2:00 p.m. MST
- Game weather: 53 °F (12 °C)
- Game attendance: 28,088
- Box score

Game information

**First quarter**

- NYJ – Nick Lowery 37-yard field goal, 2:47. Jets 3–0.

**Second quarter**

- NYJ – Keyshawn Johnson 34-yard pass from Frank Reich (Nick Lowery kick), 14:53. Jets 10–0.
- NYJ – Richie Anderson 1-yard run (Nick Lowery kick), 0:16. Jets 17–0.

**Third quarter**

- ARI – Larry Centers 1-yard pass from Kent Graham (Greg Davis kick), 7:35. Jets 17–7.
- ARI – Larry Centers 2-yard pass from Kent Graham (Greg Davis kick), 5:47. Jets 17–14.

**Fourth quarter**

- NYJ – Adrian Murrell 1-yard run (Nick Lowery kick), 12:51. Jets 24–14.
- ARI – Rob Moore 6-yard pass from Kent Graham (Greg Davis kick), 11:47. Jets 24–21.
- NYJ – Reggie Cobb 2-yard run (Nick Lowery kick), 4:55. Jets 31–21.

**Top passers**

- NYJ – Frank Reich – 22/31, 254 yards, TD, 2 INT
- ARI – Kent Graham – 17/32, 255 yards, 3 TD, INT

**Top rushers**

- NYJ – Adrian Murrell – 31 rushes, 199 yards, TD
- ARI – LeShon Johnson – 12 rushes, 85 yards

**Top receivers**

- NYJ – Keyshawn Johnson – 7 receptions, 94 yards, TD
- ARI – Rob Moore – 7 receptions, 143 yards, TD

The 0-8 Jets were desperately looking for their first win of the season as they faced the Cardinals in Arizona. In the first quarter, Nick Lowery opened the score for the Jets with a 37-yard field goal. By the second quarter, the Jets powered through with two touchdowns from Keyshawn Johnson and Richie Anderson. However, by the third quarter, the Cardinals scored two touchdowns of their own, cutting the Jets' lead to three. Fortunately, in the fourth quarter, the Jets scored two more touchdowns, en route to their first victory of the season as they defeated the Cardinals 31–21.

== Standings ==
AFC East
	W	L	T	PCT	PF	PA	STK
^{(2)} New England Patriots	11	5	0	.688	418	313	W1
^{(4)} Buffalo Bills	10	6	0	.625	319	266	W1
^{(6)} Indianapolis Colts	9	7	0	.563	317	334	L1
Miami Dolphins	8	8	0	.500	339	325	W2
New York Jets	1	15	0	.063	279	454	L7
