= Wally Richardson =

American football player (born 1974)

No. 14
- Position: Quarterback

Personal information
- Born: February 11, 1974 (age 52); Orangeburg, South Carolina, U.S.
- Listed height: 6 ft 4 in (1.93 m)
- Listed weight: 225 lb (102 kg)

Career information
- High school: Sumter (Sumter, South Carolina)
- College: Penn State (1992–1996)
- NFL draft: 1997: 7th round, 234th overall pick

Career history
- Baltimore Ravens (1997–1998); Atlanta Falcons (1999); New York/New Jersey Hitmen (2001); Los Angeles Avengers (2001)

Career NFL statistics
- Passing attempts: 2
- Passing completions: 1
- Completion percentage: 50%
- TD–INT: 0–0
- Passing yards: 1
- Passer rating: 56.2
- Stats at Pro Football Reference

Career AFL statistics
- Comp. / Att.: 20 / 40
- Passing yards: 280
- TD–INT: 6–3
- Passer rating: 79.17
- Stats at ArenaFan.com

Wallace Herman Richardson (born February 11, 1974) is an American former professional football player who was a quarterback in the National Football League (NFL). He played college football for the Penn State Nittany Lions.

== College career ==
Richardson spent five seasons under head coach Joe Paterno at Pennsylvania State University. In 1992, as a true freshman, Richardson relieved starting quarterback John Sacca who went down with an injury in the season opener against Cincinnati. He led three scoring drives in the second half to help defeat the Bearcats 24–20. He was 5-of-10 passing for 35 yards. His performance earned him his first collegiate start the following week against Temple. Richardson led the Nittany Lions to victory, completing 10-of-19 passes for 165 yards and a 15-yard touchdown pass to Mike Archie. He also scored his only career rushing touchdown on a one-yard quarterback sneak. Sacca returned from injury the following week, but Richardson saw relief action against Eastern Michigan, Maryland and Pittsburgh. In the 1993 Blockbuster Bowl against Stanford, Richardson relieved Sacca and Kerry Collins late in the fourth quarter but completed just one pass on eight attempts for 11 yards. On the regular season he appeared in five games (one start) and completed 24-of-45 passes for 312 yards and two touchdowns.

In 1993, Richardson competed with Collins and Sacca for the starting quarterback position. Sacca won the job, with Collins earning the number two position. Two games into the season Collins was promoted to starting quarterback and Sacca left the team. Richardson was number two on the depth chart, but did not appear in a game and was able to retain his redshirt status.

In 1994, Richardson backed up Collins for the second consecutive season. He appeared in nine regular season games and was 16-of-33 passing for 177 yards. He also appeared in the 1995 Rose Bowl against Oregon, but did not record any statistics.

Richardson began his redshirt junior season at Penn State as the starting quarterback. He led the Nittany Lions to a 9–2 regular season record. He was 193-of-335 passing for 2,198 yards and 18 touchdowns. Against Auburn in the Outback Bowl, he threw for 217 yards and four touchdowns in the victory.

In 1996, Richardson led the Nittany Lions to a 10–2 regular season record. In his final game at Penn State, Richardson led the Nittany Lions to a victory in the Fiesta Bowl against Texas.

=== Statistics ===
Season	Team	Games			Passing								Rushing			
Season	Team	GP	GS	Record	Cmp	Att	Pct	Yds	Y/A	TD	Int	Rtg	Att	Yds	Avg	TD
1992	Penn State	5	1	1–0	24	45	53.3	312	6.9	2	0	126.2	6	1	0.2	1
1993	Penn State	Redshirt														
1994	Penn State	9	0	—	16	33	48.5	177	5.4	0	0	93.5	6	−19	−3.2	0
1995	Penn State	11	11	8–3	193	335	57.6	2,198	6.6	18	6	126.9	40	−121	−3.0	0
1996	Penn State	12	12	10–2	145	279	52.0	1,732	6.2	7	8	106.7	29	−98	−3.4	0
Regular season		37	23	19–5	378	692	54.6	4,419	6.2	27	14	117.1	81	−237	−2.9	1
Bowl games		4	2	2–0	26	52	50.0	323	6.2	5	2	126.2	2	−2	−1.0	0

Bowl games only began counting toward single-season and career statistics in 2002.

- 1993 Blockbuster Bowl – 1/8, 11 yards, Int
- 1995 Rose Bowl – appeared in the game, but did not record any statistics
- 1996 Outback Bowl – 13/24, 217 yards, 4 TD, Int
- 1997 Fiesta Bowl – 12/20, 95 yards, TD. Two rushes for (−2)

== Professional career ==
=== Baltimore Ravens ===
Richardson was selected by the Baltimore Ravens in the seventh round of the 1997 NFL draft with the 234th overall pick. He made the 1997 roster, but did not record a snap and was the backup to quarterbacks Vinny Testaverde and Eric Zeier. On February 18, 1998, Richardson was allocated to the England Monarchs of the NFL Europe (NFLE). He started the season opener against Frankfurt, but was replaced by backup quarterback Josh LaRocca due to being ineffective. In the season finale against Barcelona, Richardson replaced LaRocca who left the game with a bruised pectoral muscle after only two offensive plays. Richardson led the Monarchs to a 28–20 victory, where he was 12-of-14 passing for 165 yards with two touchdowns and one interception. During the Monarchs' 1998 season, Richardson completed 19-of-43 passes for 194 yards with two touchdowns and interceptions. In the 1998 NFL season, Richardson remained the backup to Jim Harbaugh and Zeier. In the season finale against the Detroit Lions, Richardson relieved Harbaugh after the first play of the game due to an injury. His lone completion was to tight end Brian Kinchen for one yard. After two series, Harbaugh reentered for Richardson and the Ravens won the game 19–10. On August 23, 1999, Richardson was released by the Ravens.

=== Atlanta Falcons ===
On December 22, 1999, Richardson was signed by the Atlanta Falcons. He was activated for the final two games of the season, but did not appear in a game. Richardson was released on June 30, 2000.

=== New York/New Jersey Hitmen ===
On October 28, 2000, Richardson was a territorial selection of the New York/New Jersey Hitmen of the XFL. He began the season as the third-string quarterback to Charles Puleri and Corte McGuffey. In the season opener against Las Vegas, Richardson made his Hitmen debut, where he completed 3-of-5 passes for 31 yards and an interception. In week three against Orlando, Richardson came off of the bench for Puleri and threw his first professional touchdown pass to tight end Marcus Hinton on a 20-yard completion. As part of a kayfabe quarterback controversy, Richardson (who, as part of the sports entertainment approach the XFL used, was given an angle in which his larger hands were an advantage he had over his small-handed predecessor, local native Puleri. Richardson was named the starter the following week against Chicago, and led the Hitmen to its first win in franchise history. Richardson started the following four weeks before sustaining a leg injury in week eight against Orlando that ended his season prematurely. He appeared in six games (five starts) for the Hitmen and was 83-of-142 passing for 812 yards with six touchdowns and interceptions. He also added 148 rushing yards which was second on the team to running back Joe Aska.

=== Los Angeles Avengers ===
In 2001, Richardson signed with the Los Angeles Avengers of the Arena Football League (AFL). Due to injuries of quarterbacks Todd Marinovich and Tony Graziani, the Avengers signed Richardson and fellow XFL Memphis Maniax quarterback Jim Druckenmiller to compete for the backup role for the final two games of the season.

In his Avengers debut, Richardson replaced starting quarterback Harry Leons and threw three touchdowns against the Carolina Cobras. He started the season finale against the Oklahoma Wranglers where he was 7-of-16 passing for 151 yards and three touchdowns. On the season for the Avengers he was 20-of-40 passing with 280 yards and six touchdowns to three interceptions. He was waived prior to training camp in 2002.

== Professional career statistics ==
Year	Team	Games			Passing								Rushing			
Year	Team	GP	GS	Record	Cmp	Att	Pct	Yds	Y/A	TD	Int	Rtg	Att	Yds	Avg	TD
1997	BAL	0	0	—	DNP											
1998	ENG	?	?	—	19	43	44.2	194	4.5	2	2	53.8	4	9	2.2	0
1998	BAL	1	0	—	1	2	50.0	1	0.5	0	0	56.2	1	0	0.0	0
1999	ATL	0	0	—	DNP											
2001	NY/NJ	6	5	3–2	83	142	58.5	812	5.7	6	6	71.1	26	148	5.7	0
2001	LA	2	1	0–1	20	40	50.0	280	7.0	6	3	81.3	1	−2	−2.0	0
Career		?	?	?–?	123	227	54.2	1,287	5.7	14	11	71.2	32	155	4.8	0

== Post-football ==
Upon his retirement from professional football, Richardson joined Penn State's Morgan Academic Support Center for Student-Athletes, first as a graduate assistant in 2001 and then as an academic counselor from 2003 to 2007. From 2007 to 2011, Richardson served as the associate director of the Rankin Smith Student-Athlete Service Center at the University of Georgia, working with members of the football, women's volleyball and equestrian teams. He was named associate director of football academic support at the University of North Carolina before the 2011 football season.

In April 2013, Richardson was named director of the Penn State Football Letterman's Club, an organization of more than 1,500 former Penn State football players and student managers.
