= 1995 Oakland Raiders season =

NFL team 36th season

- Owner: Al Davis
- General manager: Al Davis
- Head coach: Mike White
- Home stadium: Oakland–Alameda County Coliseum

Results
- Record: 8–8
- Division place: 5th AFC West
- Playoffs: Did not qualify
- Pro Bowlers: Tim Brown, WR; Steve Wisniewski, G Chester McGlockton, DT; Terry McDaniel, CB

The 1995 Oakland Raiders season was the franchise's 26th season in the National Football League, the 36th overall, and their first back in Oakland since 1981. The Raiders announced their return to Oakland on June 25, 1995, and the Alameda County Board of Supervisors approved it the next month. While the Raiders raced out to an impressive 8–2 start, a number of key injuries (including the loss of starting quarterback Jeff Hostetler) caused them to lose their final six games and miss the playoffs. The Raiders, for the first time since 1962 (and joining the NFL), finished at the bottom of their division, the AFC West, ending a streak of 32 consecutive non-last place finishes. It was also the solitary season from 1963 to 2003 where they finished last place in their division.

== Offseason ==
=== NFL draft ===
1995 Los Angeles Raiders draft
| Round | Pick | Player | Position | College | Notes |
| 1 | 18 | Napoleon Kaufman | Running back | Washington | |
| 2 | 49 | Barret Robbins | Center | TCU | |
| 3 | 86 | Joe Aska | Running Back | Central Oklahoma | |
| 4 | 118 | Mike Morton | Linebacker | North Carolina | |
| 5 | 138 | Matt Dyson | Linebacker | Michigan | |
| 5 | 154 | Jeff Kysar | Offensive tackle | Arizona State | |
| 6 | 190 | Eli Herring | Offensive Tackle | BYU | |
Made roster

== Personnel ==
=== Staff / Coaches ===
1995 Oakland Raiders staff
| Front office: Principal Owner / President of the General Partner – Al Davis; Senior Executive – John Herrera; Head coaches: Head coach – Mike White; Offensive coaches: Offense Coordinator / Assistant Head Coach – Joe Bugel; Quarterbacks Coach - Jim Fassel; Running Backs – Bishop Harris; Wide receivers – Mike Wilson; Tight ends – Bill Meyers; Offensive line – Joe Bugel; Offensive line – Mike White; Offensive Quality Control / Assistant Wide Receivers - Fred Biletnikoff | Defensive coaches: Defensive Coordinator – John Fox; Defensive line – Floyd Peters; Linebackers – Fred Whittingham; Defensive backs – Steve Shafer; Assistant Defensive Backs / Squad Development - Willie Brown; Defensive Assistant - John Guy; Special teams coaches: Special teams – Kevin Spencer; Strength and conditioning: Strength and conditioning – Garrett Giemont |

=== Roster ===
1995 Oakland Raiders roster
| Quarterbacks (QB): 11 Vince Evans; 8 Jeff Graham; 9 Billy Joe Hobert; Running backs (RB): 35 Joe Aska; 42 Eric Ball; 34 Derrick Fenner FB; 44 Calvin Jones; 26 Napoleon Kaufman; 22 Harvey Williams; Wide receivers (WR): 81 Tim Brown PR; 80 Daryl Hobbs; 86 Rocket Ismail KR; 82 James Jett; Tight ends (TE): 88 Kerry Cash; 87 Andrew Glover; 85 Marcus Hinton | Offensive linemen (OL): 70 Russell Freeman T; 66 Kevin Gogan G; 64 Robert Jenkins T; 79 Jeff Kysar T; 71 Gerald Perry T; 63 Barret Robbins C; 78 Greg Skrepenak T; 77 Rich Stephens G/T; 67 Dan Turk C; 76 Steve Wisniewski G; Defensive linemen (DL): 93 Jerry Ball DT; 99 Aundray Bruce DE; 74 Nolan Harrison DE/DT; 91 Chester McGlockton DT; 95 Austin Robbins DE/DT; 94 Anthony Smith DE; 56 Pat Swilling DE | Linebackers (LB): 54 Greg Biekert MLB; 59 Matt Dyson OLB; 58 Keith Franklin MLB; 53 Rob Fredrickson OLB; 57 Rob Holmberg MLB; 52 Mike Jones OLB; 50 Mike Morton OLB; 51 Aaron Wallace OLB; Defensive backs (DB): 33 Eddie Anderson FS; 46 Carl Kidd CB; 31 Joe King FS; 25 Dan Land SS; 29 Albert Lewis CB; 36 Terry McDaniel CB; 48 Najee Mustafaa CB; 39 Bruce Pickens CB; 37 James Trapp CB; Special teams (ST): 5 Cole Ford K; 7 Jeff Gossett P; 18 Jeff Jaeger K | Practice squad: 19 A. C. Caswell WR; 84 Sean Foster WR; 62 Tom Robsock G; Reserve: 55 James Folston LB (IR); 20 Derrick Hoskins S (IR); 15 Jeff Hostetler QB (IR); 72 Don Mosebar C (IR); 53 active, 4 inactive, 3 practice squad Rookies in italics |

== Preseason ==
| Week | Date | Opponent | Result | Record | Venue |
|---|---|---|---|---|---|
| 1 | August 5 | at Dallas Cowboys | W 27–14 | 1–0 | Texas Stadium |
| 2 | August 12 | St. Louis Rams | W 27–22 | 2–0 | Oakland–Alameda County Coliseum |
| 3 | August 18 | at Minnesota Vikings | L 17–20 | 2–1 | Hubert H. Humphrey Metrodome |
| 4 | August 25 | New England Patriots | W 32–24 | 3–1 | Stanford Stadium |

== Schedule ==
| Week | Date | Opponent | Result | Record | Venue | Recap |
|---|---|---|---|---|---|---|
| 1 | September 3 | **San Diego Chargers** | **W** 17–7 | 1–0 | Oakland–Alameda County Coliseum | Recap |
| 2 | September 10 | at Washington Redskins | **W** 20–8 | 2–0 | Robert F. Kennedy Memorial Stadium | Recap |
| 3 | September 17 | at **Kansas City Chiefs** | **L** 17–23 (OT) | 2–1 | Arrowhead Stadium | Recap |
| 4 | September 24 | Philadelphia Eagles | **W** 48–17 | 3–1 | Oakland–Alameda County Coliseum | Recap |
| 5 | October 1 | at New York Jets | **W** 47–10 | 4–1 | Giants Stadium | Recap |
| 6 | October 8 | **Seattle Seahawks** | **W** 34–14 | 5–1 | Oakland–Alameda County Coliseum | Recap |
| 7 | October 16 | at **Denver Broncos** | **L** 0–27 | 5–2 | Mile High Stadium | Recap |
| 8 | October 22 | Indianapolis Colts | **W** 30–17 | 6–2 | Oakland–Alameda County Coliseum | Recap |
| 9 | Bye | | | | | |
| 10 | November 5 | at Cincinnati Bengals | **W** 20–17 | 7–2 | Riverfront Stadium | Recap |
| 11 | November 12 | at New York Giants | **W** 17–13 | 8–2 | Giants Stadium | Recap |
| 12 | November 19 | Dallas Cowboys | **L** 21–34 | 8–3 | Oakland–Alameda County Coliseum | Recap |
| 13 | November 27 | at **San Diego Chargers** | **L** 6–12 | 8–4 | Jack Murphy Stadium | Recap |
| 14 | December 3 | **Kansas City Chiefs** | **L** 23–29 | 8–5 | Oakland–Alameda County Coliseum | Recap |
| 15 | December 10 | Pittsburgh Steelers | **L** 10–29 | 8–6 | Oakland–Alameda County Coliseum | Recap |
| 16 | December 17 | at **Seattle Seahawks** | **L** 10–44 | 8–7 | Kingdome | Recap |
| 17 | December 24 | **Denver Broncos** | **L** 28–31 | 8–8 | Oakland–Alameda County Coliseum | Recap |
Note: Intra-division opponents are in **bold** text.

== Game summaries ==
=== Week 1 ===
| Team | 1 | 2 | 3 | 4 | Total |
|---|---|---|---|---|---|
| Chargers | 0 | 7 | 0 | 0 | 7 |
| • Raiders | 0 | 7 | 10 | 0 | 17 |

- Date: September 3
- Location: Oakland–Alameda County Coliseum, Oakland, California
- Game weather: 63 °F (17 °C), wind 11 mph (18 km/h)
- TV announcers (NBC): Dan Hicks, Randy Cross, Jim Gray

Scoring summary
| 2 | OAK | Tim Brown 5 yard pass from Jeff Hostetler (Cole Ford kick) | Raiders 7–0 |
| 2 | SD | Shawn Jefferson 39 yard pass from Stan Humphries (John Carney kick) | Tie 7–7 |
| 3 | OAK | Cole Ford 46 yard field goal | Raiders 10–7 |
| 3 | OAK | Napoleon Kaufman 16 yard run (Cole Ford kick) | Raiders 17–7 |

== Standings ==
AFC West
| | W | L | T | PCT | PF | PA | STK |
|---|---|---|---|---|---|---|---|
| ^{(1)} Kansas City Chiefs | 13 | 3 | 0 | .813 | 358 | 241 | W2 |
| ^{(4)} San Diego Chargers | 9 | 7 | 0 | .563 | 321 | 323 | W5 |
| Seattle Seahawks | 8 | 8 | 0 | .500 | 363 | 366 | L1 |
| Denver Broncos | 8 | 8 | 0 | .500 | 388 | 345 | W1 |
| Oakland Raiders | 8 | 8 | 0 | .500 | 348 | 332 | L6 |
