= 1996 Outback Bowl =

- 10th Outback Bowl
Penn State Nittany Lions	Auburn Tigers
(8–3)	(8–3)
Big Ten	SEC
43	14
Head coach: Joe Paterno	Head coach: Terry Bowden
AP / Coaches / BA; 15 / 16 / 15	AP / Coaches / BA; 16 / 15 / 16
	1	2	3	4	Total
Penn State	3	13	27	0	43
Auburn	0	7	0	7	14
- Date: January 1, 1996
- Season: 1995
- Stadium: Tampa Stadium
- Location: Tampa, Florida
- MVP: Bobby Engram (Penn State WR)
- Referee: Tommy Taylor
- Attendance: 65,313

United States TV coverage
- Network: ESPN
- Announcers: Ron Franklin, Mike Gottfried

The 1996 Outback Bowl featured the Auburn Tigers and the Penn State Nittany Lions. This was the tenth edition of the game previously known as the Hall of Fame Bowl, and the first one to use the Outback Bowl name, with sponsorship from Outback Steakhouse. Penn State turned a close first half into a blowout, with a big third-quarter run, and ended up winning by a score of 43-14. Penn State's total of 43 points would stand as an Outback Bowl record for 20 years, until it was surpassed by Tennessee in the 2016 Outback Bowl.

== Summary ==
The first quarter was dominated by defense, as the only points came on a 19-yard field goal from Penn State placekicker Brett Conway. With that chip shot, Penn State opened up a 3–0 lead. With 12:39 left in the second quarter, Auburn posted the first touchdown of the game, with a 25-yard pass from quarterback Patrick Nix to Robert Baker. Auburn claimed a 7–3 lead after the successful extra point.

Auburn's defense continued its stellar play, giving up field goals of 22 and 38 yards to fall behind, 9–7. Then with just 5 seconds in the half, Penn State quarterback Wally Richardson threw an 8-yard touchdown pass to Mike Archie, to make it a 16–7 halftime lead.

Penn State opened the second half on a tear, thanks to effective adjustments. Just 5 minutes into the second half, Richardson earned his second touchdown pass of the game, a 9-yard spiral to Bobby Engram, who later played in the NFL, to take a 23–7 lead. Just two-and-a-half minutes later, Richardson threw his third touchdown pass, a 4-yarder to Steven Pitts, making it 29–7. Penn State elected to go for a two-point conversion, but failed.

Halfback Curtis Enis scored from 1 yard out to make it 36–7. A minute later, Richardson hooked up with Bobby Engram for their second touchdown of the game, a 20-yarder. After 40 unanswered points by Penn State, the score stood at 43–7. Auburn scored one more time in the fourth quarter, on a 16-yard run by Kevin McLeod, making the final score 43–14.
