= Charles Puleri =

American football player (born 1969)

No. 7
- Position: Quarterback

Personal information
- Born: March 1, 1969 (age 57); New York City, New York, U.S.
- Listed height: 6 ft 2 in (1.88 m)
- Listed weight: 195 lb (88 kg)

Career information
- High school: Lehman (Bronx, New York)
- College: Westchester CC (1989); Scottsdale CC (1990); New Mexico State (1991–1992)
- NFL draft: 1993: undrafted

Career history
- Sacramento Gold Miners (1993); Shreveport Pirates (1994)*; Miami Hooters (1995); Texas Terror (1996); Scottish Claymores (1997)*; Albany Firebirds (1997)*; London Monarchs (1997); Iowa Barnstormers (1997–1998); New Jersey Red Dogs (1999); Tampa Bay Storm (2000)*; Dallas Cowboys (2000)*; New York/New Jersey Hitmen (2001); Detroit Fury (2001–2002); Colorado Crush (2003)*; Buffalo Destroyers (2003)
- * Offseason or practice squad member only

Career AFL statistics
- Comp. / Att.: 128 / 257
- Passing yards: 1,604
- TD–INT: 20–14
- QB rating: 66.35
- Rushing TD: 3
- Stats at ArenaFan.com

Charles "Charley" Puleri (born March 1, 1969) is an American former professional football quarterback who played from 1993 to 2003, with stints in the Canadian Football League (CFL), World League of American Football (WLAF), Arena Football League (AFL), National Football League (NFL), and XFL.

== Early life ==
Charles "Charley" Puleri was born on March 1, 1969, in New York City, New York. He attended Herbert H. Lehman High School in the Bronx, where he excelled as the quarterback of the football team, earning All-City honors. As a senior, he passed for more than 800 yards and 14 touchdowns while leading a team that ran the option offense. In addition to football, Puleri also lettered in baseball.

== College career ==
=== Community College ===
Puleri began his collegiate career at Westchester Community College, where he was named the starting quarterback as a freshman and led the team to an 8–2 record. The following year, after his parents relocated to Arizona, he enrolled at Scottsdale Community College. There, he led the program to one of the top offenses in the nation, ranking among the leaders at the national junior college level in passer rating. While at Scottsdale, Puleri drew the attention of New Mexico State assistant coach Henry Stroka, leading to his recruitment by the Aggies.

=== New Mexico State ===
Puleri joined the Aggies under second-year head coach Jim Hess in 1991. He began the season as the third-string quarterback behind David Chisum and Cody Ledbetter, seeing limited action through the first eight games. He gained recognition after coming off the bench against Long Beach State, rallying the Aggies from a double-digit fourth-quarter deficit to a 28–24 comeback victory. Puleri went on to start the final two games of the season. In his first career start against UNLV, he completed 27 of 46 passes for 360 yards and three touchdowns. Despite his strong individual performance, the Aggies were unable to secure a win in either contest.

In 1992, Puleri won the starting quarterback job over Ledbetter, who was subsequently redshirted. He opened the season by leading the Aggies to a victory over Weber State, marking the program’s first season-opening win in 11 years. Consecutive wins over New Mexico and UTEP in the Battle of I-10 helped propel the Aggies to a 3–0 record, their best start since 1975. Puleri delivered several standout performances during the season, including a 361-yard, four-touchdown game against Cal State Fullerton. In the season finale against San Jose State, he completed 23 of 38 passes for 425 yards and threw two fourth-quarter touchdown passes in a 34–24 victory. The win secured a 6–5 record for the Aggies, marking the program’s first winning season since the 1978 season. It also denied San Jose State a conference championship and a berth in the Las Vegas Bowl.

On the season, Puleri led the Big West Conference in passing yards (2,788), touchdown passes (16), yards per attempt (8.0), passing yards per game (253.5), and passer rating (127.8). He earned first-team All-Big West honors and set a New Mexico State single-season passing yardage record.

=== Statistics ===
Season	Team	Games			Passing								Rushing			
Season	Team	GP	GS	Record	Cmp	Att	Pct	Yds	Y/A	TD	Int	Rtg	Att	Yds	Avg	TD
1991	New Mexico State	6	2	0−2	68	107	63.6	846	7.9	5	2	141.6	16	−20	−1.3	0
1992	New Mexico State	11	11	6−5	189	349	54.2	2,788	8.0	16	15	127.8	63	−157	−2.5	3
Career		17	13	6−7	257	456	56.4	3,634	8.0	21	17	131.0	79	−177	−2.2	3

== Professional career ==
Pre-draft measurables
Height	Weight	Arm length	Hand span	40-yard dash	10-yard split	20-yard split	20-yard shuttle	Vertical jump	Broad jump
6 ft 0 in (1.83 m)	208 lb (94 kg)	31.75 in (0.81 m)	9.50 in (0.24 m)	5.10 s	1.76 s	2.94 s	4.53 s	24.5 in (0.62 m)	9 ft 10 in (3.00 m)
All values from NFL Combine

=== Sacramento Gold Miners ===
In 1993, Puleri signed with the Sacramento Gold Miners of the Canadian Football League. He served as the third-string quarterback behind David Archer and Kerwin Bell, and saw limited game action, attempting two passes, both of which were incomplete.

=== Shreveport Pirates ===
In 1994, Puleri signed with the Shreveport Pirates of the Canadian Football League. During training camp he suffered an injury, and he was subsequently released prior to the start of the regular season on June 27, 1994.

=== Miami Hooters ===
Puleri signed with the Miami Hooters of the Arena Football League in 1995. Puleri began the season as the third-string quarterback behind Mike Pawlawski and Sam Hughes. Following Pawlawski’s release after an 0–5 start, Puleri was elevated to primary backup. In the sixth game of the season against the Orlando Predators, he relieved Hughes, who had exited the game with a mild concussion. Puleri made his first start the following week against the Memphis Pharaohs, completing 14 of 33 passes for 127 yards with two touchdowns and two interceptions in a 40–24 loss. For the season, he completed 21 of 49 passes for 233 yards, throwing three touchdowns and two interceptions, and also recorded one rushing touchdown.

=== Texas Terror ===
In 1996, Puleri signed with the Texas Terror of the Arena Football League. He saw limited action at quarterback, completing four of seven passes for 26 yards.

=== London Monarchs ===
During the offseason, Puleri briefly spent time with the Scottish Claymores of the World League of American Football during their preseason training camp in Atlanta. He then signed with the Albany Firebirds, but was released on April 7, 1997, to pursue opportunities with the London Monarchs.

Puleri joined the Monarchs during the 1997 season, at a time when the team was already without Stan White and Preston Jones. In Week Eight against the Amsterdam Admirals, third-string quarterback Kerry Joseph suffered a knee injury, and Puleri, who had been with the team just 10 days, was called into action. In that game, he threw his first touchdown pass of the season, a six-yard completion to Terrence Davis. He made his first start the following week against the Claymores, leading London to a 10–9 victory. In the game, two former Claymores, including Puleri, played key roles in London’s narrow win. He also started the season finale against the Rhein Fire, but the Monarchs were defeated 10–7. Puleri threw a 38-yard touchdown pass to tight end Mike Titley but was intercepted three times during the contest. For the season, he completed 42 of 94 passes for 488 yards, with two touchdowns and four interceptions.

=== Iowa Barnstormers ===
Following the completion of the 1997 World League of American Football season, Puleri signed with the Iowa Barnstormers of the Arena Football League. He served as the backup to Kurt Warner, who led the Barnstormers to an ArenaBowl XI appearance. After Warner signed with the St. Louis Rams following the season, Puleri became the starter for the 1998 season, beginning with the Hall of Fame game against the Arizona Rattlers.

Due to struggles during the season, the Barnstormers acquired Aaron Garcia midseason, who replaced Puleri as the starting quarterback. Puleri finished the season completing 67 of 126 passes for 866 yards with 11 touchdowns and five interceptions, while adding one rushing touchdown.

=== New Jersey Red Dogs ===
On March 30, 1999, Puleri was traded to the New Jersey Red Dogs for future considerations. He served as the backup to Rickey Foggie, completing two of three passes for 31 yards with one touchdown and one interception, in addition to recording one rushing touchdown. Puleri was released after the team signed former NFL quarterback Tommy Maddox in the offseason.

=== Dallas Cowboys ===
Puleri joined the Tampa Bay Storm. Shortly afterward, he was invited to work out for the Dallas Cowboys for a chance at the third-string quarterback position, competing with Aaron Garcia and Todd Hammel, who were also brought in. They were competing behind starter Troy Aikman and the previous year's third-string quarterback Mike Quinn. Puleri was signed on March 8, 2000, but was released on June 8. He was re-signed on August 16, 2000, although the quarterback room had been mostly solidified: Aikman was the starter, Randall Cunningham the second-string, and Clint Stoerner had secured the third-string position after beating out Paul Justin, who was released to make room for Puleri. Puleri’s only statistics came in the preseason finale against the St. Louis Rams, where he completed five of nine passes for 31 yards. He was released at the end of the preseason on August 27, 2000.

=== New York/New Jersey Hitmen ===
On October 28, 2001, Puleri was selected in the first round, seventh overall, by the New York/New Jersey Hitmen in the 2001 XFL draft. He began the season as the team's starting quarterback. A native of New York City, Puleri played in the XFL debut against the Las Vegas Outlaws on national television, completing six of 19 passes for 71 yards and an interception, and was subsequently benched as the Hitmen lost 19–0. His struggles were later attributed to the ball's slippery texture, which the league corrected by using sandpaper and a wirebrush to roughen the surface.

The following week, he completed 13 of 24 passes for 193 yards and an interception in a 19–12 loss to Birmingham. Puleri and the Hitmen faced media scrutiny following the loss. In Week 3 against the Orlando Rage, he was benched in favor of backup quarterback Wally Richardson and was eventually demoted to third string behind Corte McGuffey. In Week 10, with Richardson out, Puleri replaced an ineffective McGuffey against Birmingham, leading the Hitmen to a 22–0 victory by completing five of seven passes for 158 yards and two touchdowns. The win kept the Hitmen's playoff hopes alive, though the team was later eliminated after Chicago secured a playoff spot.

=== Detroit Fury ===
On May 23, 2001, following the conclusion of the XFL season, Puleri signed with the Detroit Fury of the Arena Football League. He did not record any statistics that season while serving as the backup to Scott Semptimphelter. He re-signed with Detroit on May 16, 2002, and made his first appearance eight days later against the New York Dragons. He entered the game after starting quarterback Drew Miller twisted his ankle. Puleri’s first pass attempt of the season was a 27-yard touchdown to Chuck Levy, and he finished the game completing 10 of 21 passes for 125 yards with one touchdown and two interceptions. The following week against the Georgia Force, Miller reinjured his ankle on the second play, and Puleri took over, completing 16 of 35 passes for 266 yards with three touchdowns and one interception in a 49–34 loss. He was released the following Monday on June 3, 2002. For the 2002 season, Puleri finished with 22 completions on 56 attempts for 391 yards, four touchdowns, and three interceptions.

=== Buffalo Destroyers ===
On November 22, 2002, Puleri was signed by the Colorado Crush, but he was released prior to the season on January 15, 2003.

In the middle of the 2003 season, Puleri was signed by the Buffalo Destroyers on April 9. Two days later, he made his Buffalo debut against the Orlando Predators, replacing starting quarterback Chris Sanders. Puleri went eight of 16 passing for 57 yards with one touchdown and three interceptions in the loss. He was released on April 15, then re-signed to the practice squad on April 18, and returned to the active roster on April 23.

== Personal life ==
In addition to his football career, Puleri appeared in films during the 1990s. He had a featured extra role in There's Something About Mary and appeared as a quarterback extra in Any Given Sunday.

In his post-playing career, Puleri worked as a mortgage loan officer in Delray Beach, Florida.
