= DiCosmo =

DiCosmo or Di Cosmo is an Italian surname. Notable people with the surname include:

- Anthony DiCosmo (born 1977), American football player
- Francesco DiCosmo, American rock musician
- Julián Di Cosmo (born 1984), Argentine footballer
- Nicola Di Cosmo, American historian and sinologist
- Roberto Di Cosmo, Italian computer scientist
