= Corte McGuffey =

American football player (born 1977)

No. 12
- Position: Quarterback

Personal information
- Born: June 19, 1977 (age 49)
- Listed height: 6 ft 1 in (1.85 m)
- Listed weight: 215 lb (98 kg)

Career information
- High school: Riverton (WY)
- College: Northern Colorado
- NFL draft: 2000: undrafted

Career history
- St. Louis Rams (2000)*; New York/New Jersey Hitmen (2001)
- * Offseason or practice squad member only

Awards and highlights
- 2× NCAA Division II National Champion (1996, 1997); Harlon Hill Trophy (1999); Northern Colorado Bears No. 12 retired

Corte McGuffey (born June 19, 1977) is a former quarterback for the New York/New Jersey Hitmen of the XFL. In 1999, he won the Harlon Hill Trophy as the NCAA Division II Player of the Year.

McGuffey was a dentist. He now lives in Wyoming.

== High School career ==
McGuffey played Quarterback at Riverton High School where he led the team to its first Class 3A Football State Championship in 1994. During his senior season, McGuffey threw for over 2,000 passing yards and more than 20 touchdowns, powering Riverton to a 9–2 regular-season record.

He was twice named all-state quarterback and was recognized as the 1994 Wyoming Offensive Player of the Year.

== College career ==
McGuffey joined Northern Colorado and redshirted during the 1995 season. In 1997, McGuffey led the Bears to an NCAA Division II football championship game victory over New Haven. In 1998, McGuffey was named honorable mention FB Gazette All-American. In games against Western State and Adams State, McGuffey threw a program record six touchdown passes. In 1999, McGuffey was named First-team Daktronics, CoSIDA, Burker King, AFCA, AP and FB Gazette. He also won the Harlon Hill Trophy for Player of the Year in NCAA Division II. In both his junior and senior seasons he was named First-team All-NCC.

As of 2025, McGuffey is still the program leader in career passing yards (8,677), total yards (9,722), and touchdowns (93). He also still holds the Bears single season record for passing yards (3,376), total yards (3,537), and touchdowns (36).

On November 10, 2007, McGuffey's number 12 was retired by Northern Colorado.

== Professional career ==
On April 17, 2000, McGuffey was signed by the St. Louis Rams. After the Rams third preseason game, McGuffey was released on August 20, 2000.

On October 30, 2000, McGuffey was selected 279th overall in the 2001 XFL draft by the New York/New Jersey Hitmen. McGuffey signed with the Hitmen and began the season as the backup quarterback to Charles Puleri. In the second half of season opener against Las Vegas, McGuffey relieved Puleri and went 9-of-16 passing for 103 yards while adding another 19 rushing yards. After the team started 0–3, head coach Rusty Tillman elected to go with Wally Richardson as starting quarterback. McGuffey did not record another statistic until Richardson was ruled out with a leg injury heading into the week nine matchup against Chicago. In his first professional start, McGuffey was 13-of-22 passing for 146 yards and two interceptions. After losing to the Enforcers 18–23, the Hitmens' postseason hopes were still alive and McGuffey remained the starter. McGuffey started the season finale against Birmingham, but was removed in favor of Puleri after going 3-of-10 passing for 85 yards.

== Career statistics ==
=== College ===
Season	Team	Games			Passing								Rushing			
Season	Team	GP	GS	Record	Cmp	Att	Pct	Yds	Y/A	TD	Int	Rtg	Att	Yds	Avg	TD
1995	Northern Colorado	Redshirt														
1996	Northern Colorado	?	0	—	2	4	50.0	17	4.3	0	0	85.7	3	-2	-1.5	0
1997	Northern Colorado	15	15	13–2	160	254	63.0	2,312	9.1	18	10	155.0	121	451	3.7	6
1998	Northern Colorado	13	13	11–2	236	382	61.7	3,061	8.0	39	9	158.1	67	346	5.2	6
1999	Northern Colorado	13	13	11–2	222	351	63.2	3,376	9.6	36	13	170.5	90	161	1.8	2
Career		?	41	35–6	620	991	62.6	8,766	8.8	93	32	161.4	281	956	3.4	14

=== XFL ===
Season	Team	Games			Passing								Rushing			
Season	Team	GP	GS	Record	Cmp	Att	Pct	Yds	Avg	TD	Int	Rtg	Att	Yds	Avg	TD
2001	NY/NJ	3	2	1–1	25	48	52.1	329	6.8	0	2	56.7	8	33	4.1	0
Career		3	2	1–1	25	48	52.1	329	6.8	0	2	56.7	8	33	4.1	0
