= Fred Brock =

American football player (born 1974)

No. 89
- Position: Wide receiver

Personal information
- Born: November 15, 1974 (age 51); Montgomery, Alabama, U.S.
- Listed height: 5 ft 11 in (1.80 m)
- Listed weight: 181 lb (82 kg)

Career information
- High school: Jefferson Davis (Montgomery)
- College: Southern Miss
- NFL draft: 1996: undrafted
- Expansion draft: 1999: 1st round, 19th overall pick

Career history
- Arizona Cardinals (1996–1998); Cleveland Browns (1999)*; New York Giants (1999)*; New York/New Jersey Hitmen (2001)
- * Offseason or practice squad member only
- Stats at Pro Football Reference

Frederick Lee Brock (born November 15, 1974) is an American former professional football player who was a wide receiver for the Arizona Cardinals of the National Football League (NFL) from 1997 to 1998. He played college football for the Southern Miss Golden Eagles. He also played professionally for the New York/New Jersey Hitmen of the XFL in 2001.
