= Lou D'Agostino =

American football player (born 1973)

No. 27
- Position: Fullback

Personal information
- Born: December 12, 1973 (age 52); Brooklyn, New York, U.S.
- Listed height: 6 ft 0 in (1.83 m)
- Listed weight: 235 lb (107 kg)

Career information
- High school: Cedarhurst (NY) Lawrence
- College: Hofstra, Rhode Island
- NFL draft: 1996: undrafted

Career history
- New York Jets (1996); Florida Bobcats (1998); New York/New Jersey Hitmen (2001)
- Stats at Pro Football Reference

Lou D'Agostino (born December 12, 1973) is an American former professional football player who was a fullback for the New York Jets of the National Football League (NFL) in 1996. He played college football for the Hofstra Pride and Rhode Island Rams. He also played professionally in the XFL for the New York/New Jersey Hitmen in 2001.
