= 1997 Fiesta Bowl (January) =

1997 Tostitos Fiesta Bowl
- 26th Fiesta Bowl
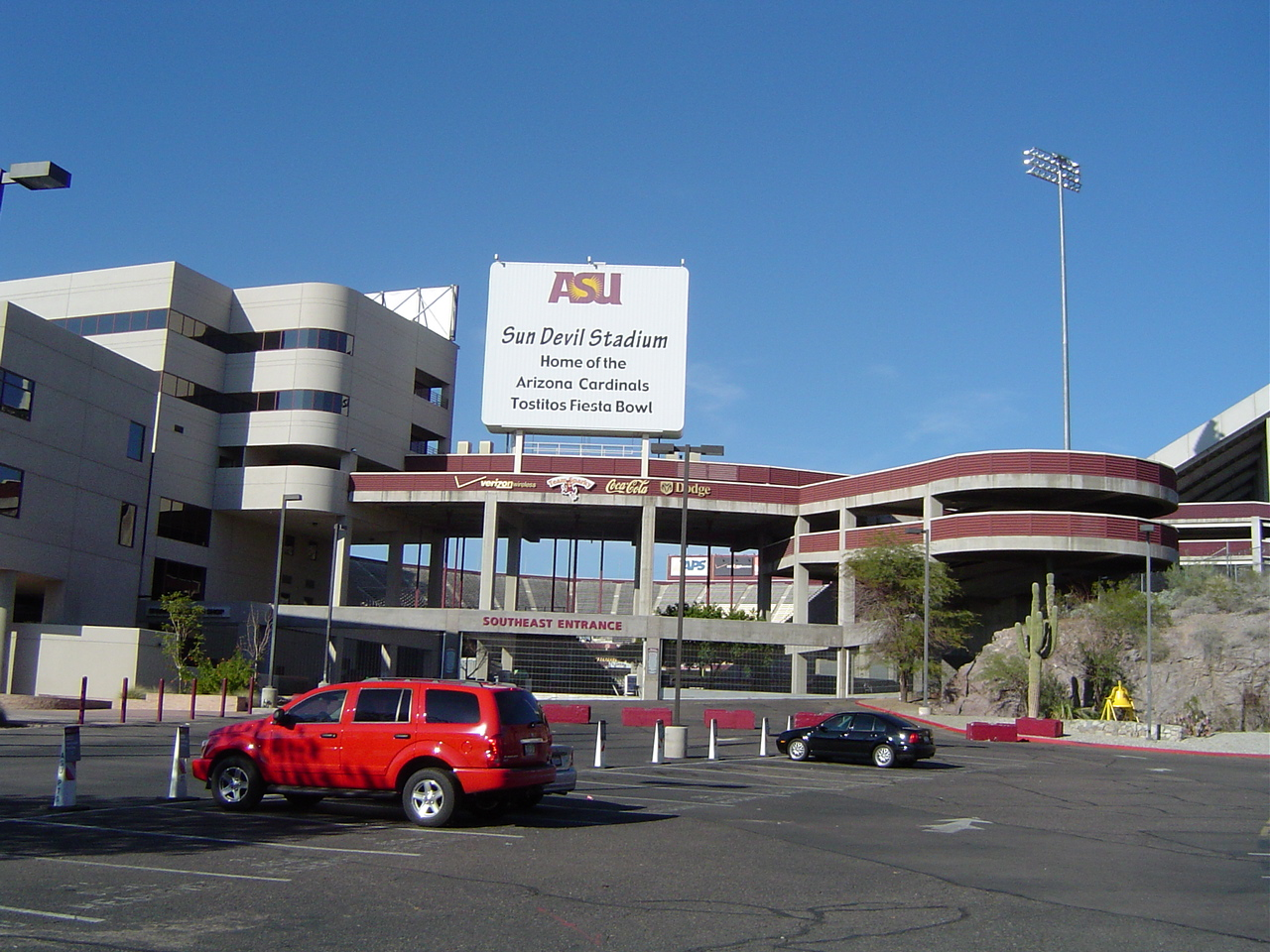
- Sun Devil Stadium in Tempe, Arizona, hosted the Fiesta Bowl.
Penn State Nittany Lions	Texas Longhorns
(10–2)	(8–4)
Big Ten	Big 12
38	15
Head coach: Joe Paterno	Head coach: John Mackovic
AP / Coaches / BA; 7 / 7 / 7	AP / Coaches / BA; 20 / 20 / 20
	1	2	3	4	Total
Penn State	7	0	21	10	38
Texas	3	9	3	0	15
- Date: January 1, 1997
- Season: 1996
- Stadium: Sun Devil Stadium
- Location: Tempe, Arizona
- Favorite: Texas by 1
- Referee: Mack Gentry (SEC)
- Attendance: 65,106

United States TV coverage
- Network: CBS
- Announcers: Jim Nantz and Terry Donahue

The 1997 Tostitos Fiesta Bowl game was a post-season college football bowl game between the Penn State Nittany Lions and the Texas Longhorns on January 1, 1997, at Sun Devil Stadium in Tempe, Arizona. Penn State defeated Texas, 38–15. The game was part of the 1996-1997 Bowl Alliance of the 1996 NCAA Division I-A football season and represented the concluding game of the season for both teams.

The Longhorns, who were fresh off their upset of No. 3 Nebraska in the first ever Big 12 Championship Game, went into their second straight Alliance bowl with a five-game winning streak.

== Game Summary ==
Texas outgained Penn State 242-95 yards in the first half and posted a 12–7 lead at the half. Quarterback James Brown completed 13 of 18 passes for 150 yards and Ricky Williams ran for 47 yards and a touchdown on nine carries in the first 30 minutes. However, an interception, two drives which were stopped at the Penn State 11, and a failed two-point conversion allowed the Nittany Lions to remain close.

Penn State's opening score was set up by a Brown interception at the Texas 26 on the second play from scrimmage. The Lions drove to the end zone in four plays, which ended in a four-yard touchdown pass from Wally Richardson to Curtis Enis.

The Longhorns bounced back and drove to the Penn State seven, and Phil Dawson connected on a 28-yard field goal to cut the lead to 7–3.

The Lions ended with a three-and-out on consecutive possessions and, on their first possession of the second quarter, Texas planned another solid drive and found the end zone as Williams charged ran across the goal line for a seven-yard score. The two-point conversion failed.

The third quarter was the turning point in the game. Penn State scored 21 points with three rushing scores and limited the Longhorns to just a field goal. Penn State led 28–15 at the end of the third quarter.

On the Lions’ final series of the third quarter, Chafie Fields set up a one-yard touchdown run by Anthony Cleary on an 85-yard double-reverse to the Texas five-yard line.

Texas failed to produce any more offense as Penn State scored 10 more points to seal the 38–15 victory. Penn State outgained the Texas offense 425–360, 330–118 in the second half.
