= Chris Brantley =

American football player (born 1970)

No. 88, 82, 00, 8
- Position: Wide receiver

Personal information
- Born: December 12, 1970 (age 55); Rahway, New Jersey, U.S.
- Listed height: 5 ft 10 in (1.78 m)
- Listed weight: 180 lb (82 kg)

Career information
- High school: Teaneck (Teaneck, New Jersey)
- College: Rutgers
- NFL draft: 1994: 4th round, 108th overall pick

Career history
- Los Angeles Rams (1994); Buffalo Bills (1996); Scottish Claymores (1998); New York/New Jersey Hitmen (2001); New Jersey Gladiators (2001)

Career NFL statistics
- Receptions: 9
- Receiving yards: 76
- Touchdowns: 1
- Stats at Pro Football Reference

Christopher Charles Brantley (born December 12, 1970) is an American former professional football player who was a wide receiver in the National Football League (NFL). He played college football for the Rutgers Scarlet Knights.

Brantley graduated in 1989 from Teaneck High School in Teaneck, New Jersey and was inducted into the Teaneck Athletic Hall of Fame in April 2011. He attended Rutgers University, where he set many records and is currently in the Rutgers Football Hall of Fame. He was the Scarlet Knights' all-time leader in touchdown receptions with 17, and second all-time in receptions with 144. He was selected in the fourth round (108th overall pick) in the 1994 NFL draft by the Los Angeles Rams. He later signed as a free agent with the Buffalo Bills.

Brantley has one daughter, Kayla Brantley (30–31), and resides in Jersey City, New Jersey. He is currently a sports agent at LIFT Sports Management and represents numerous NBA basketball players as well as football players. He served as athletic director of the Torah Academy of Bergen County for the 2017–2018 academic year.
