= Joey Eloms =

American football player (born 1976)

No. 43, 26
- Position: Defensive back

Personal information
- Born: April 4, 1976 (age 50); Fort Wayne, Indiana, U.S.
- Listed height: 5 ft 10 in (1.78 m)
- Listed weight: 181 lb (82 kg)

Career information
- High school: Concordia Lutheran (Fort Wayne)
- College: Indiana
- NFL draft: 1998: undrafted

Career history
- Seattle Seahawks (1998); → Scottish Claymores (1999); Pittsburgh Steelers (1999)*; Seattle Seahawks (1999); New York/New Jersey Hitmen (2001)
- * Offseason or practice squad member only

Career NFL statistics
- Total tackles: 7
- Passes defended: 1
- Stats at Pro Football Reference

Joey Eloms (born April 4, 1976) is an American former professional football player who was a defensive back for the Seattle Seahawks of the National Football League (NFL) from 1998 to 1999. He played college football for the Indiana Hoosiers. He also played professionally for the New York/New Jersey Hitmen of the XFL in 2001.
