= Rodney Williams (basketball) =

American basketball player (born 1991)

Personal information
- Born: July 23, 1991 (age 35) Minneapolis, Minnesota, U.S.
- Listed height: 6 ft 7 in (2.01 m)
- Listed weight: 200 lb (91 kg)

Career information
- High school: Robbinsdale Cooper (New Hope, Minnesota)
- College: Minnesota (2009–2013)
- NBA draft: 2013: undrafted
- Playing career: 2013–2017
- Position: Small forward

Career history
- 2013–2015: Delaware 87ers
- 2015–2016: Oklahoma City Blue
- 2016–2017: Greensboro Swarm
- Stats at Basketball Reference

Rodney Williams Jr. (born July 23, 1991) is an American former professional basketball player who last played for the Greensboro Swarm of the NBA Development League. Williams played college basketball for four years at the University of Minnesota and then went undrafted in the 2013 NBA draft. He is 6'7" and plays the small forward position.

== High school career ==
Williams attended Robbinsdale Cooper High School, where he became the schools all-time leading scorer and second in all-time rebounds. In his junior year, the Hawks went 23–9 and reached the state semi-finals. In his senior season, they went an impressive 27–2 losing only to eventual state champions Hopkins and in the section finals to state tournament runner-up Osseo. Williams averaged 15.5 points and 7.6 rebounds per game that season, being named to the Minneapolis Star Tribune all-metro team and the St. Paul Pioneer Press second team all-state.

== College career ==
Williams matriculated at Minnesota in 2009 and pursued a degree in youth studies. He was in danger of being suspended for academics in his freshman season, but managed to become eligible. In his first two games in a Minnesota uniform, he scored 14 points in each. As a freshman, he established himself as a high-flying dunker. Williams was a starter his last three years, but stepped into a larger role his junior year when Trevor Mbakwe missed most of the season for the 2011–12 Golden Gophers. In Mbakwe's absence, Williams finished among the 2011–12 Big Ten Conference leaders in several statistics: rebounds per game (10th, 5.6), steals per game (10th, 1.3), blocked shots per game (4th 1.4), and field goal percentage (5th, 56.4%). Williams led the team scoring (12.2 ppg), rebounding, steals and blocks averages that year, and in the 2012 National Invitation Tournament he averaged 19.2 points and 5.6 rebounds. The following year, upon Mbakwe's return, most of Williams' averages were down slightly, but he still finished among the 2012–13 Big Ten Conference leaders in blocked shots per game (6th 1.3). Part of this is due to a shooting slump he suffered in early 2013. In non-conference games, he averaged 13 point per game. Williams finished his career with 1,145 points, which is 26th on the Gophers scoring list, and became the 19th in the history of Gopher basketball to amass 1,000 points and 500 rebounds in a career. He also finished his career with over 100 blocked shots and held the Gopher basketball record for most games played at 134 until it was broken by Austin Hollins.

== Professional career ==
After going undrafted in the 2013 NBA draft, Williams joined the Philadelphia 76ers for the 2013 NBA Summer League. On September 27, 2013, he signed with the 76ers. However, he was later waived by the 76ers on October 27, 2013. In November 2013, he was acquired by the Delaware 87ers.

On August 11, 2014, Williams signed with Eisbären Bremerhaven of the Basketball Bundesliga for a three-week trial period. Following the trial period, he was not signed for the season. On January 21, 2015, he was reacquired by the Delaware 87ers. Three days later, he was traded to the Oklahoma City Blue in exchange for a 2015 third-round pick.

On October 31, 2016, Williams was acquired by the Greensboro Swarm of the NBA Development League. On March 22, 2017, he was waived by the Swarm after suffering a season-ending injury.

== Personal ==
Williams is the son of Rodney and Shanell Williams. He is a childhood friend of Royce White.
