= Ryan Collins =

American football player (born 1975)

No. 49, 87, 88
- Position: Tight end

Personal information
- Born: November 1, 1975 (age 51); Minneapolis, Minnesota, U.S.
- Listed height: 6 ft 6 in (1.98 m)
- Listed weight: 259 lb (117 kg)

Career information
- High school: Robbinsdale Cooper (New Hope, Minnesota)
- College: St. Thomas
- NFL draft: 1998: undrafted

Career history
- Minnesota Vikings (1998)*; Cleveland Browns (1999); Baltimore Ravens (1999); New York/New Jersey Hitmen (2001); Amsterdam Admirals (2002–2003); Kansas City Chiefs (2002)*
- * Offseason or practice squad member only

Career NFL statistics
- Receptions: 4
- Receiving yards: 62
- Stats at Pro Football Reference

Ryan Albert Collins (born November 1, 1975) is an American former professional football player who was a tight end for the Baltimore Ravens of the National Football League (NFL), the Amsterdam Admirals of NFL Europe, and the New York/New Jersey Hitmen of the XFL. He played college football for the St. Thomas Tommies.

== Early life ==
Collins was born November 1, 1975, in Minneapolis, Minnesota, to Albert and Barbara Collins. He attended Robbinsdale Cooper High School, where he played football, baseball, basketball, and track.

== College career ==
Collins attended the University of St. Thomas in St. Paul, Minnesota, where he majored in communications with a minor in business. He played for the St. Thomas Tommies football and basketball teams.

In football, Collins was selected to the All-MIAC team, the AFCA Division III All-America team, and was among 36 seniors to play in the 1997 Aztec Bowl.

== Professional career ==
=== Minnesota Vikings ===
Collins signed with the Minnesota Vikings as a free agent on May 4, 1998. The team waived him on August 30, 1998, but signed him to the practice squad a day later, where he remained for the rest of the 1998 season. His contract expired on January 25, 1999.

=== Cleveland Browns ===
The Cleveland Browns signed Collins as a free agent on February 22, 1999. Late in the 1999 preseason, Collins suffered a shoulder injury that left him on the inactive list for the first 3 weeks of the season. He was cut by the Browns on September 27, 1999.

=== Baltimore Ravens ===
On October 12, 1999, Collins was signed to the Baltimore Ravens' practice squad. On December 3, amid a series of injuries to the Ravens' tight ends, he was activated off the practice squad to play in four games, starting three.

On December 26, 1999, Collins made three receptions for 41 yards in a 22–0 win over the Cincinnati Bengals. This was the Ravens' first shutout win in franchise history. However, during the third quarter of the game, Collins fractured his left ankle and was removed from the game. He was placed on injured reserve following the game.

He was released by the Ravens on August 28, 2000.

=== New York/New Jersey Hitmen ===
On October 30, 2000, Collins was selected with the 282nd pick of the 2001 XFL draft by the New York/New Jersey Hitmen. He played in all 10 games with the Hitmen and recorded three receptions for 38 yards.

=== Amsterdam Admirals ===
Collins played with the Amsterdam Admirals of NFL Europe in 2002 and 2003. He started all 10 games of the 2002 season, making 34 catches for a total of 280 yards and two touchdowns. He was named to the 2002 all-NFL Europe team. In the 2003 season, he played in eight games and started six. He was again named to the 2003 all-NFL Europe team, becoming the only player to be named to the team in both 2002 and 2003.

=== Kansas City Chiefs ===
Shortly after the end of the 2002 NFL Europe season, on June 27, 2002, Collins was signed by the Kansas City Chiefs. At the time, the Chiefs were stuck in a contract stalemate with tight end Tony Gonzalez. The Chiefs released Collins on September 2, 2002.
