= Israel Raybon =

American football player (born 1973)

No. 91, 92, 93
- Position: Defensive end

Personal information
- Born: February 5, 1973 (age 53); Huntsville, Alabama, U.S.
- Listed height: 6 ft 6 in (1.98 m)
- Listed weight: 300 lb (136 kg)

Career information
- High school: Lee (Huntsville, Alabama)
- College: North Alabama (1992–1996)
- NFL draft: 1996: 5th round, 163rd overall pick

Career history
- Pittsburgh Steelers (1996); Carolina Panthers (1997); New York/New Jersey Hitmen (2001); Grand Rapids Rampage (2002–2004)

Awards and highlights
- AFL All-Rookie Team (2002); 3× NCAA Division II national champion (1993–1995)
- Stats at Pro Football Reference
- Stats at ArenaFan.com

Israel Deshon Raybon (born February 5, 1973) is an American former professional football defensive end who played two seasons in the National Football League (NFL) with the Pittsburgh Steelers and Carolina Panthers. He was selected by the Steelers in the fifth round of the 1996 NFL draft after playing college football at the University of North Alabama. He was also a member of the New York/New Jersey Hitmen of the XFL and Grand Rapids Rampage of the Arena Football League (AFL).

== Early life ==
Israel Deshon Raybon was born February 5, 1973, in Huntsville, Alabama. He attended Lee High School in Huntsville, where he lettered in both football and basketball. He garnered all-state recognition in football during both his junior and senior years. He was also named an All-American his senior year.

== College career ==
He was a four-year letterman for the North Alabama Lions from 1992 to 1995. He started at both defensive end and defensive tackle while with the Lions, recording career totals of 116 solo tackles, 71 assisted tackles, 12.5 sacks, and a school-record nine blocked kicks. He was a three-time all-Gulf South Conference selection and a two-time All-American. Raybon was also named the NCAA Division II defensive lineman of the year as a senior in 1995. The Lions won the NCAA Division II national championship each year from 1993 to 1995. Raybon played in both the Blue–Gray Football Classic and Senior Bowl after his senior season. He was inducted into the school's athletic hall of fame in 2006.

== Professional career ==
Raybon was selected by the Pittsburgh Steelers in the fifth round, with the 163rd overall pick, of the 1996 NFL draft. He officially signed with the team on July 16. He played in three games for the Steelers during the 1996 season, recording one solo tackle and one sack. His only sack with the Steelers was on Monday Night Football against Dan Marino. He also appeared in one playoff game that season.

On August 24, 1997, Raybon was traded to the Carolina Panthers for a 1998 seventh round draft pick. He played in nine games for the Panthers that year, totaling five solo tackles, one assisted tackle, and 0.5 sacks. On November 23, 1997, he helped the Panthers defeat the St. Louis Rams 16–10 by deflecting a fourth down pass from Mark Rypien inside the 10-yard line late in the fourth quarter. Raybon was released on December 15, 1997.

Raybon played in all ten games, starting eight, for the New York/New Jersey Hitmen of the XFL in 2001, accumulating 33 tackles, five sacks, and one interception. He was listed as a defensive tackle with the Hitmen.

He signed with the Grand Rapids Rampage of the Arena Football League (AFL) on December 13, 2001. He appeared in 13 games, starting seven, for the Rampage during the 2002 AFL season as an offensive lineman/defensive lineman, posting seven solo tackles, five assisted tackles, three sacks, two interceptions, and two pass breakups, earning AFL All-Rookie team honors. He played both offense and defense in the AFL as the league played under ironman rules. Raybon re-signed with the team on January 1, 2003. He was placed on the physically unable to perform list on January 7, and then placed on injured reserve on January 25. He later played in six games during the 2003 season, totaling five solo tackles, one assisted tackle, and three sacks, before being placed on injured reserve again on April 15, 2003. He re-signed with the Rampage again on November 17, 2003. Raybon played in 15 games during his final AFL season in 2004, recording seven solo tackles, six assisted tackles, one sack, three pass breakups, and one interception that he returned two yards for a touchdown.

== Personal life ==
After his football career, Raybon spent time working for the United States Department of Homeland Security and later became a car salesman.
