= Bob Rosenstiel =

American football player (born 1974)

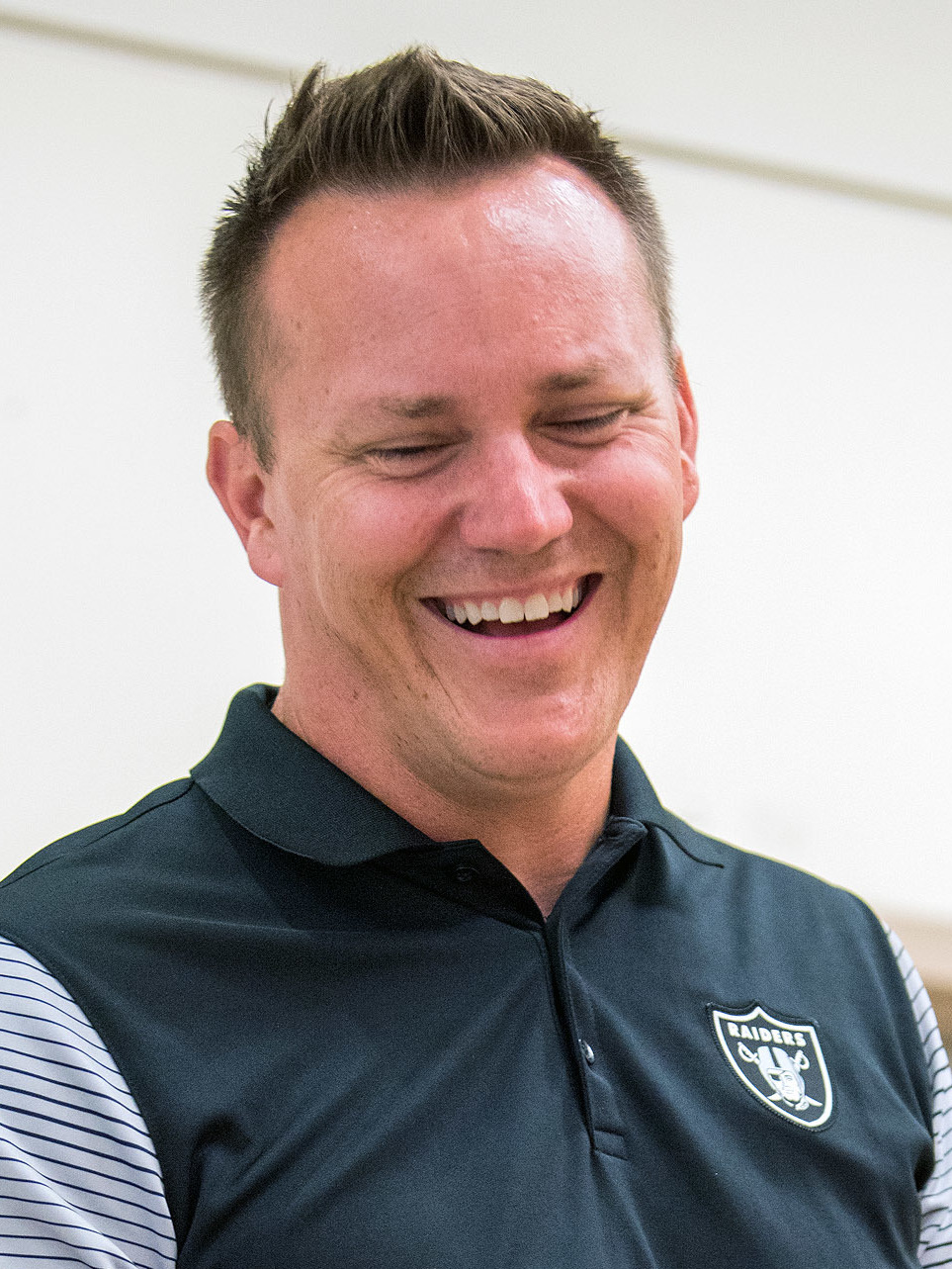
- Rosenstiel in 2018

No. 89
- Position: Tight end

Personal information
- Born: February 7, 1974 (age 52); Prineville, Oregon, U.S.
- Listed height: 6 ft 3 in (1.91 m)
- Listed weight: 240 lb (109 kg)

Career information
- High school: Junction City (OR)
- College: Eastern Illinois
- NFL draft: 1997: undrafted

Career history
- Oakland Raiders (1997); Kansas City Chiefs (1998–1999)*; Amsterdam Admirals (1999); New York/New Jersey Hitmen (2001)
- * Offseason or practice squad member only
- Stats at Pro Football Reference

Bob Rosenstiel (born February 7, 1974) is an American former professional football player who was a tight end for the Oakland Raiders of the National Football League (NFL) in 1997. He played college football for the Eastern Illinois Panthers. He also played professionally in the XFL for the New York/New Jersey Hitmen in 2001.

Rosenstiel attended community college at the College of the Siskiyous before transferring to Eastern Illinois University. He now lives in Boerne, Texas coaching a middle school football team for Geneva School of Boerne.
