= Zola Davis =

American football player (born 1975)

No. 87, 80
- Position: Wide receiver

Personal information
- Born: January 16, 1975 (age 51); Charleston, South Carolina, U.S.
- Listed height: 6 ft 0 in (1.83 m)
- Listed weight: 185 lb (84 kg)

Career information
- High school: Burke (Charleston)
- College: South Carolina
- NFL draft: 1999: undrafted

Career history
- Green Bay Packers (1999)*; Cleveland Browns (1999–2000); New York/New Jersey Hitmen (2001)
- * Offseason or practice squad member only

Awards and highlights
- SEC All-Freshman (1995)
- Stats at Pro Football Reference

Zola Nakia Davis (born January 16, 1975) is an American former professional football wide receiver who played one season with the Cleveland Browns of the National Football League (NFL). He played college football at the University of South Carolina. He was also a member of the Green Bay Packers and New York/New Jersey Hitmen.

== Early life ==
Davis played high school football at Burke High School in Charleston, South Carolina. He was a three-time all-state selection, played wide receiver and defensive back and was rated the No. 1 wide receiver in the nation by SuperPrep his senior year. He also won three letters in football and four in basketball.

== College career ==
Davis played for the South Carolina Gamecocks from 1995 to 1998. He finished his college career with 164 receptions for 2,354 yards and 17 touchdowns. He was inducted into the South Carolina Athletic Hall of Fame in 2014.

== Professional career ==
Davis was signed by the Green Bay Packers on April 23, 1999, after going undrafted in the 1999 NFL draft. He was released by the Packers on August 30, 1999.

Davis spent the 1999 season with the Cleveland Browns. He played in six games, starting one, while recording 2 receptions for 38 yards. He was released by the Browns on August 22, 2000.

Davis played for the New York/New Jersey Hitmen of the XFL in 2001. He recorded 29 receptions for 378 yards and four touchdowns.
