= Dino Philyaw =

American football player (born 1970)

No. 34, 32, 37, 24
- Position: Running back

Personal information
- Born: October 30, 1970 (age 56); Dudley, North Carolina, U.S.
- Listed height: 5 ft 10 in (1.78 m)
- Listed weight: 205 lb (93 kg)

Career information
- High school: Southern Wayne (Dudley)
- College: Oregon
- NFL draft: 1995: 6th round, 195th overall pick

Career history
- New England Patriots (1995)*; Carolina Panthers (1995–1996); St. Louis Rams (1997)*; Green Bay Packers (1998)*; Scottish Claymores (1998); New Orleans Saints (1999); New York/New Jersey Hitmen (2001)
- * Offseason or practice squad member only

Career NFL statistics
- Rushing yards: 54
- Rushing average: 3.4
- Touchdowns: 1
- Kick returns: 54
- Return yards: 1,188
- Stats at Pro Football Reference

Delvic Dyvon "Dino" Philyaw (born October 30, 1970) is an American former professional football player who served as a running back and kick returner for the National Football League (NFL)'s Carolina Panthers and New Orleans Saints.

Originally selected in 1995 by the New England Patriots, he signed with the team shortly after he was drafted, but was cut by the team on September 1, 1995. He later joined the expansion Carolina Panthers for one game during the 1995 season, returning one kickoff for 23 yards. The following season, he returned to the Panthers as a backup running back to Anthony Johnson. With the Panthers in 1996, Philyaw rushed for 38 yards and scored his only touchdown. After being released by the Panthers after the 1996 season, Philyaw was out of the NFL for both the 1997 and 1998 seasons, briefly playing with NFL Europe's Scottish Claymores in 1998. He returned to the NFL in 1999 serving as the New Orleans Saints primary kick returner and a backup running back. He returned 53 kickoffs for 1,165 yards and rushed for an additional 16 yards. He joined the short-lived XFL in 2000 as a member of the New York/New Jersey Hitmen before leaving pro football for good.
