= Kirby Dar Dar =

American football player and coach (born 1972)

No. 15, 87, 80, 85
- Position: Wide receiver

Personal information
- Born: March 27, 1972 (age 54); Morgan City, Louisiana, U.S.
- Listed height: 5 ft 9 in (1.75 m)
- Listed weight: 185 lb (84 kg)

Career information
- High school: Thomas Jefferson (Tampa, Florida)
- College: Syracuse
- NFL draft: 1995: undrafted

Career history

Playing
- Miami Dolphins (1995–1998); Kansas City Chiefs (1999–2000)*; New York/New Jersey Hitmen (2001)
- * Offseason or practice squad member only

Coaching
- Syracuse Soldiers (2006)

Awards and highlights
- Fiesta Bowl champion (1992)

Career NFL statistics
- Kickoff returns: 8
- Return yards: 154
- Stats at Pro Football Reference

Kirby David Dar Dar (born March 27, 1972) is an American former professional football player who was a wide receiver in the National Football League (NFL). He played college football for the Syracuse Orange as a running back. He was signed by the Miami Dolphins of the National Football League (NFL) as an undrafted rookie free agent in 1995. He also played for the New York/New Jersey Hitmen of the XFL in 2001.

Dar Dar currently resides in Syracuse, New York and was the head coach of the short-lived Syracuse Soldiers of the American Indoor Football Association (AIFL) in 2006.

== Early life ==
Kirby David Dar Dar was born on March 27, 1972, the son of Kirby David Dar Dar, Sr.. He attended Thomas Jefferson High School in Tampa, Florida, where he played high school football and participated in track. On the football team, he was a three time letterman, as well as a team captain during his senior year. As a senior running back, he was named Hillsborough County Player-of-the-Year after rushing for over 1,700 yards and 17 touchdowns. He was also a two-time All-Sun Coast and three time All-conference selection.

== College career ==
Dar Dar then attended Syracuse University where he majored in political science and was a four-year letterman at running back. He redshirted as a true freshman. As a redshirt freshman, he appeared in every game, he returned a kickoff 95-yards for a touchdown against Florida. As a sophomore, he recorded a 100-yard touchdown on a reverse on a kickoff against Colorado in the Fiesta Bowl. As a senior, he recorded 188 carries for 853 yards and 10 touchdowns. He recorded a career-high 159 yards again Maryland.

For his career, Dar Dar recorded 292 carries for 1,337 yards and 11 touchdowns, as well as 27 receptions for 266 yards and three touchdowns.

== Professional career ==
After going unselected in the 1995 NFL draft, Dar Dar was signed as a rookie free agent by the Miami Dolphins.

As a in 1995, he spent the first 15 weeks of the season on the Dolphins' practice squad, appearing in the season finale, returning one kickoff for 22 yards. He appeared in 11 games in 1996 returning seven kickoffs for 132 yards. In 1997, he suffered a torn anterior cruciate ligament (ACL) in his right knee, during a scrimmage before the season, and spent the entire season on injured reserve. In 1998, he returned and appeared in two games. After struggling during the off season and pre-season at wide receiver, he was waived on October 1, 1998 to make room for Horace Copeland. He was signed by the Kansas City Chiefs in August, 1999. He was released less than a month later. He returned to Kansas City in 2000, spending the pre-season with the Chiefs. In 2001, he was signed as free agent by the New York/New Jersey Hitmen of the XFL. For the season, he recorded 22 receptions for 405 yards and two touchdowns. He also returned 22 kickoffs for 485 yards, as well as 26 punts for 287 yards.

=== Career statistics ===
Year	Team	Games		Receiving					Rushing					Returns										Fumbles	
Year	Team	G	GS	Rec	Yds	Avg	TD	Lng	Att	Yds	Avg	Lng	TD	KR	Yds	Avg	Lng	TD	PR	Yds	Avg	Lng	TD	Fum	Lost
1995	MIA	1	0	0	0	0.0	0	0	0	0	0	0	0	1	22	22.0	22	0	0	0	0	0	0	0	0
1996	MIA	11	0	0	0	0.0	0	0	0	0	0	0	0	7	132	18.9	25	0	0	0	0	0	0	0	0
1997	MIA	0	0	0	0	0.0	0	0	0	0	0	0	0	0	0	0	0	0	0	0	0	0	0	0	0
1998	MIA	2	0	0	0	0.0	0	0	0	0	0	0	0	0	0	0	0	0	0	0	0	0	0	0	0
2001	NY/NJ	--	--	22	405	18.4	2	77	4	31	7.8	21	0	22	485	22.0	37	0	26	287	11.0	40	0	0	0
Career		--	0	22	405	18.4	2	77	4	31	7.8	21	0	30	639	21.3	37	0	26	287	11.0	40	0	0	0

== Coaching career ==
In 2006, Dar Dar served as the head coach of the Syracuse Soldiers of the American Indoor Football Association (AIFL). The team finished with a 1-10 record, and ceased operations after only one season.
