= Robbinsdale Cooper High School =

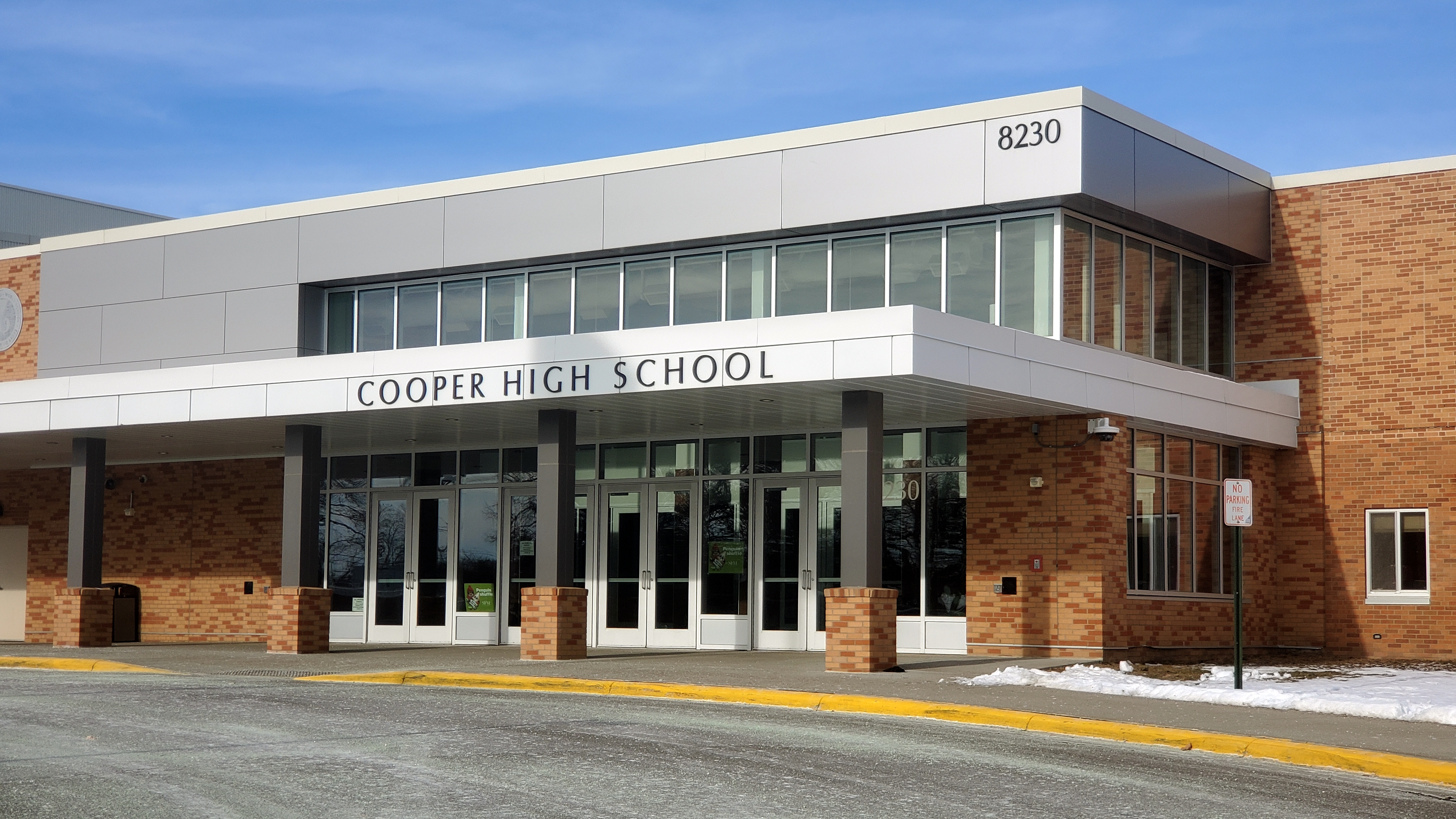
- Main entrance

Location
- 8230 47th Avenue North; New Hope, Minnesota; United States; 45.0409°N 93.3848°W

Information
- Type: Public secondary
- Established: 1964
- School district: Robbinsdale Area Schools
- Principal: Shaunice Smith
- Teaching staff: 86.22 (FTE)
- Enrollment: 1,474 (2023–2024)
- Student to teacher ratio: 17.10
- Mascot: Hawk
- Colors: Orange And Blue
- Website: chs.rdale.org

Robbinsdale Cooper High School is a 4-year public high school in New Hope, Minnesota, a northwest suburb of Minneapolis, United States. Cooper, as it is informally known, became an IB World School in July 1998, and now offers the IB Middle Years Program (MYP) and the IB Diploma Programme along with a wide variety of courses and curricula suited to the needs of every student. RCHS has a large fine arts and music program, as well as multiple extracurricular activities including a broad selection of athletics. RCHS is home to about 1600 students. Cooper students and alumni are known as Hawks, after the school's mascot.

== School history ==
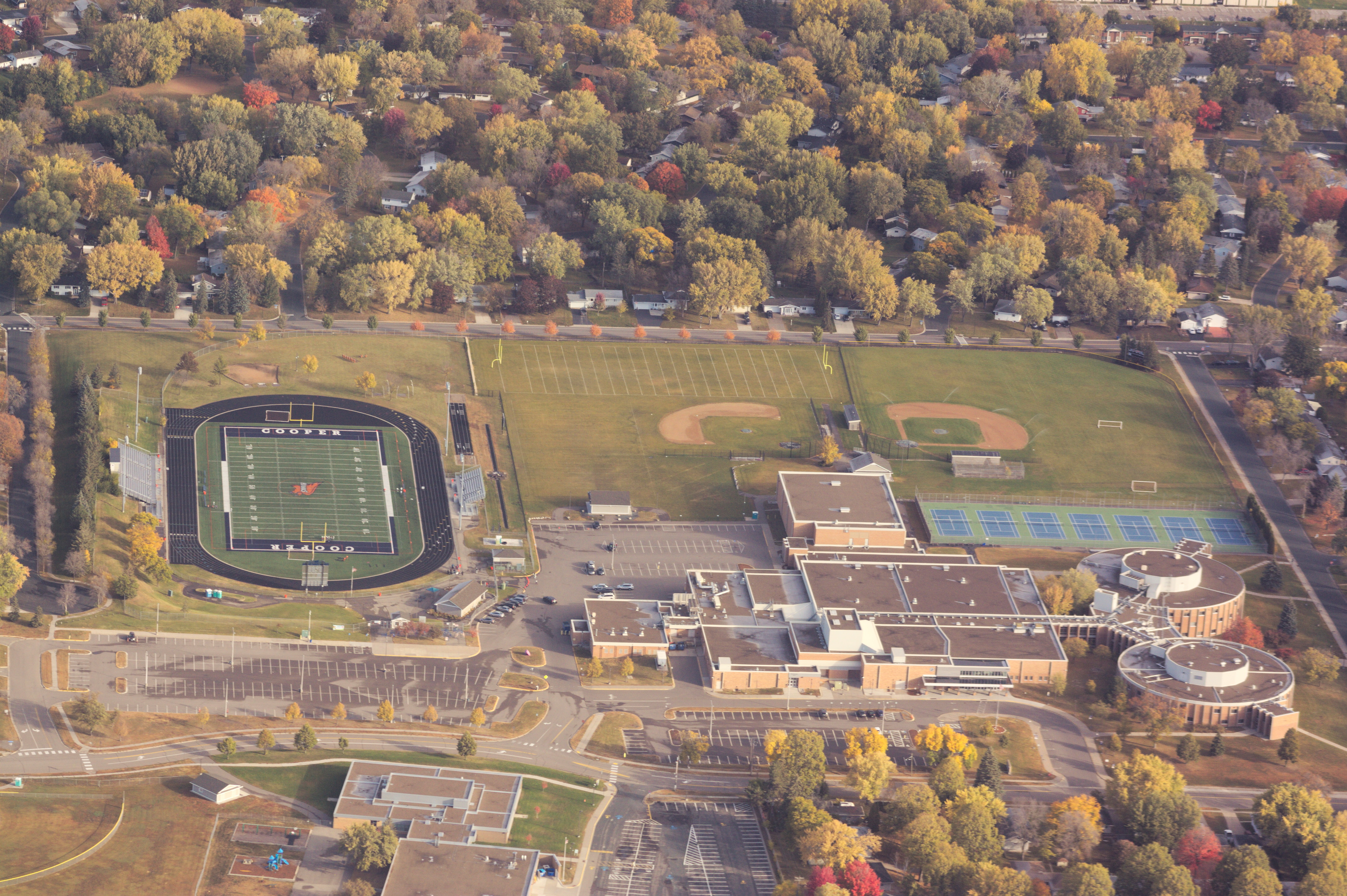
Robinsdale Cooper High School

E. J. Cooper Senior High School, as it was originally known, was built in 1964 to accommodate increasing enrollment in the Robbinsdale Area School District (Independent School District 281). Once called the most modern high school in the area, Cooper was advanced in both structure and audiovisual technology. It was named for district superintendent Edwin J. ("E.J.") Cooper, and for years E.J. was a popular guest at school gatherings. The school's first principal was Lyndon Ulrich. In its first year, Cooper held classes for kindergarten as well as grades 10 through 12. It then held grades 10 through 12 for many years before adding the 9th grade in the 1990s.

In 1982, declining enrollment in the district forced the closure of one of the district's 3 high schools. Robbinsdale High School was chosen for closure after contentious debate. In an effort to placate Robbinsdale residents, the two remaining high schools within the district, Cooper and Armstrong, were renamed Robbinsdale Cooper and Robbinsdale Armstrong.

== Cooper Athletics & Activities ==
State Athletic Team Championships
Season	Activity	Number of Championships	Year
Fall	Soccer, Boys'	1	1978
Winter	Basketball, Girls’	1	2018
Spring	Tennis, Boys'	1	1970
Spring	Softball, Girls'	1	1985
Spring	Lacrosse, Boys'	2	1999 & 2000
Spring	Wrestling, Men's	2	1965 and 1969
Spring	Total		8

State Finearts Championships
Season	Activity	Number of Championships	Year
Winter	Lincoln-Douglas Debate	1	2007
Winter	Congressional Debate	3	2022, 2023, 2025

Cooper entered into the MSHSL Metro West Conference in the fall of 2014. From 2005 to 2014, Cooper teams competed in the now-defunct North Suburban Conference.

The Girls' Swim Team won the North Suburban Conference Championship in 2005 and 2006. The Boys' Basketball Team won the Conference Championship in 2006, and finished 2nd in the state tournament behind Hopkins High School. This was the first time since 1975 that the team had made it to the state tournament. In 2010 Cooper Sophomore Brenna Walek set 4 Minnesota State High School League records for softball including home runs in a single game (4), consecutive home runs (4), RBIs in a game (9), and walks in a single game (4).

In the 2010–2011 Boys' Hockey season, the Hawks beat their archrival the Armstrong Falcons. It was the first win against Armstrong since 1995. This 2010-11 team tallied 14 wins, their most since 1984. The Girls' hockey team was also quite successful in 2010–11, racking up 7 wins which tied their all-time high. However that season would be their last as the girls' team merged with the Armstrong Falcons in the fall of 2011. The boys' hockey team merged with the Armstrong boys' team in the fall of 2014.

Traditionally, the Cooper Hawks' primary athletic rivalry has been with the Armstrong Falcons.

In 2017-18 the Girls’ Basketball team won the Metro West Conference for the second consecutive season with a 14–0 record in conference play. They would go on to win their section and advance to the state tournament for the first time in program history. The Hawks would be the #1 seed in the Class AAA State tournament and win their quarterfinal game against Alexandria High School 58–51, the next day they advanced to the State Championship game with a win over Willmar High School 65–54. In the state title game they would win against Northfield High School 49-37 for the first Girls’ Basketball Championship in School History. The Hawks finished with a record of 29–2 in the 2017–18 season.

== Notable alumni ==
- Brother Ali, artist/rapper signed to Rhymesayers Entertainment
- Ryan Collins (American football), NFL player
- Dan Johnson, NFL player
- Jim Johnson, NHL player
- Paul Kohls, member of Minnesota House of Representatives 2003-11
- Lance Pitlick, NHL player
- Steve Plasencia, distance runner, 1988 and 1992 Summer Olympics
- David Webber, class of 1987, managed in TNA wrestling as Mortimer Plumtree
- The Jets (Minnesota band), 1980s Pop/R&B Band
- The Scary Guy, anti-bullying advocate
- Rashad Vaughn, Basketball player
- Rodney Williams Jr., professional basketball player
- Steve Zahn, actor
