= Ron Merkerson =

American football player (born 1975)

Ron Merkerson (born August 30, 1975, in Clarksville, Tennessee) is a former American football linebacker.

Merkerson attended Ed W. Clark High School in Las Vegas before playing football at the University of Colorado. Merkerson was the Nevada Gatorade State Player of the Year, his senior year in high school. Merkerson was drafted by the New England Patriots with the 145th overall pick (fifth round) in the 1998 NFL draft.

Merkerson was placed on injured reserve in his rookie year because of leg surgery. He was waived in September 1999, and signed late that year to the Seattle Seahawks. Merkerson signed with the New Orleans Saints in 2000. In 2001, Merkerson signed on to play in the XFL and was 2nd in that league for tackles, including 3 sacks with the New York/New Jersey Hitmen. The linebacker played the 2002 season with the Hamilton Tiger-Cats of the Canadian Football League.
