= Tawambi Settles =

American football player (born 1976)

No. 29, 46, 34, 23, 21
- Positions: Safety, cornerback, linebacker

Personal information
- Born: January 19, 1976 (age 50); Chattanooga, Tennessee, U.S.
- Listed height: 6 ft 2 in (1.88 m)
- Listed weight: 194 lb (88 kg)

Career information
- High school: The McCallie School (Chattanooga)
- College: Duke
- NFL draft: 1998: undrafted

Career history
- Detroit Lions (1998)*; Green Bay Packers (1998)*; Jacksonville Jaguars (1998); New York Giants (2000)*; New York/New Jersey Hitmen (2001); Seattle Seahawks (2001)*; Grand Rapids Rampage (2002); Detroit Fury (2002); Atlanta Falcons (2003)*; Toronto Argonauts (2004)*; Hamilton Tiger-Cats (2004)
- * Offseason or practice squad member only

Career NFL statistics
- Tackles: 4
- Stats at Pro Football Reference

Career AFL statistics
- Tackles: 8
- Passes defended: 2
- Stats at ArenaFan.com

Tawambi Jahmon Settles (born January 19, 1976) is an American former professional football player who was a safety for one season with the Jacksonville Jaguars of the National Football League (NFL). He played college football for the Duke Blue Devils. He was also a member of the Detroit Lions, Green Bay Packers, New York Giants, New York/New Jersey Hitmen, Grand Rapids Rampage, Detroit Fury, Toronto Argonauts, and Hamilton Tiger-Cats.

== Early life ==
In high school, Settles played quarterback and defensive back at The McCallie School in Chattanooga, Tennessee. He was an All-State, three-time All-Region, and three-time All-District selection for the Blue Tornado. He also earned four letters in basketball, three in football, two in track, and one in baseball.

== College career ==
Settles played for the Blue Devils at Duke University from 1994 to 1997. He recorded totals of 262 tackles, 18 passes broken up, and five interceptions during his college career. He also blocked a total of eight field goals and extra points.

== Professional career ==
Settles signed with the NFL's Detroit Lions after going undrafted in the 1998 NFL draft. He was released by the Lions during training camp. He was signed to the practice squad of the Green Bay Packers later that season. Settles signed with the Jacksonville Jaguars of the NFL and played in seven games for the team during the 1998 season. He was signed by the NFL's New York Giants in 2000.

He played for the New York/New Jersey Hitmen of the XFL in 2001, recording eleven tackles and one interception.

On June 21, 2002, Settles was signed to the practice squad of the Grand Rapids Rampage of the Arena Football League (AFL). He was promoted to the active roster on June 27. He was released by the Rampage on July 15. Settles signed with the AFL's Detroit Fury on July 17, 2002.

He was signed by the Toronto Argonauts of the Canadian Football League on March 30, 2004. He was traded to the Hamilton Tiger-Cats on June 9 and played in six games for the team during the 2004 season.

== Personal life ==
Settles was the Assistant Head of Upper School at Ravenscroft School in Raleigh, North Carolina from 2022 to 2025. Also coaching football there. He now is the Assistant head of Middle School at Franklin Road Academy in Nashville, Tennessee
