= Anthony DiCosmo =

American football player (born 1977)

No. 84, 27
- Position: Wide receiver

Personal information
- Born: August 8, 1977 (age 49); Hackensack, New Jersey, U.S.
- Listed height: 6 ft 3 in (1.91 m)
- Listed weight: 225 lb (102 kg)

Career information
- High school: Paramus Catholic (Paramus, New Jersey)
- College: Boston College (1995–1998)
- NFL draft: 1999: undrafted

Career history
- Tampa Bay Buccaneers (1999)*; New England Sea Wolves (2000); New York/New Jersey Hitmen (2001); Los Angeles Avengers (2002)
- * Offseason or practice squad member only
- Stats at ArenaFan.com

Anthony DiCosmo (born August 8, 1977) is an American former football wide receiver. He played college football at Boston College, and professionally for the New England Sea Wolves and Los Angeles Avengers of the Arena Football League (AFL) and the New York/New Jersey Hitmen of the XFL. He was also a member of the Tampa Bay Buccaneers of the National Football League (NFL).

== Early life ==
Anthony DiCosmo was born on August 8, 1977, in Hackensack, New Jersey. He was adopted as a foster child by Petrina DiCosmo (1920–2016). He attended Paramus Catholic High School in Paramus, New Jersey, where he was a Parade All-American in both football and track. As a junior, DiCosmo had a state record 71 receptions in a season. He also set a state record in the long jump at 49’-1/2".

== College career ==
DiCosmo played college football for the Boston College Eagles of Boston College, and was a three-year letterman from 1996 to 1998. He only played in the first game of his freshman year in 1995 and suffered an elbow injury that same month. He also injured his head in a bike accident in October 1995. He started nine games his sophomore year in 1996, catching 36 passes for 632 yards and one touchdown. In 1997, he totaled 24 receptions for 362 yards and four touchdowns while also missing four games due to a hamstring injury. As a senior in 1998, DiCosmo caught 47 passes for 804 yards and seven touchdowns. In December 1998, the NCAA denied DiCosmo's appeal for a fifth year, stating that his application for a medical redshirt was never filed when DiCosmo was a freshman. He also participated in track at Boston College, placing sixth in the triple jump at the 1998 Big East Outdoor Championships with a jump of 48’-9 1/2". He graduated with a bachelor’s degree in communications.

== Professional career ==
DiCosmo signed with the Tampa Bay Buccaneers on April 19, 1999, after going undrafted in the 1999 NFL draft. He caught a touchdown during his first offensive series of the preseason. He was released during final roster cuts.

DiCosmo was signed by the New England Sea Wolves of the Arena Football League (AFL) on March 13, 2000. He played in nine games for the Sea Wolves during the 2000 season, recording 44 catches for 521 yards and seven touchdowns, nine rushes for seven yards and three touchdowns, five kick returns for 39 yards, and two solo tackles.

DiCosmo was claimed by the New York/New Jersey Hitmen of the XFL on November 29, 2000. He played in ten games, starting two, for the Hitmen during the 2001 season, catching 26 passes for 268 yards. The XFL folded after the 2001 season.

DiCosmo signed with the AFL's Los Angeles Avengers on May 16, 2002. He appeared in two games for the Avengers and posted one solo tackle before being waived on June 4, 2002.

== Personal life ==
DiCosmo later served as the senior vice president of sports marketing and development for Nickelodeon. In 2016, he was named to Sports Business Journal's 40 under 40. His son, Aeneas DiCosmo, played college football at Stanford and Vanderbilt.
