= Rusty Tillman =

American football player and coach (1946–2021)

No. 67
- Positions: Linebacker, kick returner

Personal information
- Born: February 27, 1946; Beloit, Wisconsin, U.S.
- Died: March 14, 2021 (aged 75); Flagstaff, Arizona, U.S.
- Listed height: 6 ft 2 in (1.88 m)
- Listed weight: 230 lb (104 kg)

Career information
- High school: Agua Fria (Avondale, Arizona)
- College: Northern Arizona
- NFL draft: 1970: undrafted

Career history

Playing
- Washington Redskins (1970–1977)

Coaching
- Seattle Seahawks (1979–1982) Special teams coach; Seattle Seahawks (1983–1986) Linebackers / Special teams; Seattle Seahawks (1987–1991) Tight ends / Special teams; Seattle Seahawks (1992–1994) Defensive coordinator; Tampa Bay Buccaneers (1995) Defensive coordinator; Oakland Raiders (1996–1997) Special teams; Indianapolis Colts (1998) Defensive coordinator; New York/New Jersey Hitmen (2001) Head Coach; Minnesota Vikings (2003–2005) Special teams

Awards and highlights
- 70 Greatest Redskins

Career NFL statistics
- Games played: 107
- Fumble recoveries: 3
- Kick return average: 9.9
- Stats at Pro Football Reference
- Coaching profile at Pro Football Reference

Russell Arthur Tillman (February 27, 1946 – March 14, 2021) was an American professional football player who was a linebacker for the Washington Redskins of the National Football League (NFL) from 1970 to 1977. He played college football for the Northern Arizona Lumberjacks.

Tillman was nicknamed “the King” for his special teams mastery. He played seven different special teams positions and served as special teams captain from 1974 to 1977. He was a member of Washington's 1972 NFC Championship squad.

After retiring from football, Tillman stayed in the NFL as an assistant coach for the Seattle Seahawks for 16 years, where he coached special teams, tight ends, linebackers before becoming defensive coordinator. He also spent time as assistant with Tampa Bay, Oakland, Indianapolis and Minnesota. He served as head coach of the XFL’s New York/New Jersey Hitmen; uninterested in the sports entertainment approach the league was taking, Tillman mostly took a straight approach to coaching in the league, refusing to get wrapped up in the publicity stunts. Tillman was called "Gutless Rusty" by WWF announcer and sitting Minnesota Governor Jesse Ventura, who as part of a publicity stunt, came out of his XFL broadcast booth to try to provoke a response from Tillman near the end of the league's week 4 telecast; Tillman turned away and refused to answer him.

Tillman also spent one season assistant coaching a GEJFA team in Washington, the Woodinville Falcons, with head coach John Pike, where his son played. Tillman was a special teams coach in the NFL for the Seattle Seahawks in the 1980s and the Minnesota Vikings under Mike Tice.

He died on March 14, 2021.

== Head coaching record ==
=== XFL ===
Team	Year	Regular season					Postseason			
Team	Year	Won	Lost	Ties	Win %	Finish	Won	Lost	Win %	Result
NYH	2001	4	6	0	.400	3rd in Eastern Division	did not qualify			
Total		4	6	0	.400		0	0	.000	
