= New York/New Jersey Hitmen =

XFL American football team

Logo

General information
- Founded: 1999
- Folded: 2001; 25 years ago
- Stadium: Giants Stadium
- Headquartered: East Rutherford, New Jersey
- Colors: Royal blue, silver, black

Personnel
- Owner: World Wrestling Federation
- General manager: Drew Pearson
- Head coach: Rusty Tillman

League / conference affiliations
- XFL; Eastern Division

The New York/New Jersey Hitmen were an American football team based in East Rutherford, New Jersey. The Hitmen were the members of the Eastern Division of the XFL. The team played their home games in Giants Stadium of the Meadowlands Sports Complex.

== History ==
The team's general manager was former Dallas Cowboys wide receiver, and New Jersey native, Drew Pearson.

The Hitmen were part of the Eastern Division with the Birmingham Thunderbolts, Orlando Rage and Chicago Enforcers. They finished in 3rd place with a 4-6 record. The head coach was former NFL assistant Rusty Tillman, who was not a fan of the league's gimmicks or personalities – specifically commentator Jesse Ventura, who called him "Gutless Rusty" on a regular basis, as he felt that Tillman's coaching style was too timid. Tillman, ever the professional, brushed off the jabs by Ventura and refused to respond. In the end, Ventura's attempts to goad him failed.

The Hitmen were one of the teams to play in the XFL's inaugural game. Tens of millions of viewers watched the Hitmen, who displayed a stunning lack of competence against the Las Vegas Outlaws in the contest (including a particularly ugly missed field goal and numerous miscues from starting quarterback and New York native Charles Puleri), lose 19–0. The Hitmen's poor performance in that game was a major factor in fan backlash against the league in the weeks that followed and a prime example of the league's failure to live up to expectations; the team benched Puleri in favor of Wally Richardson by Week 3 in hopes of salvaging the season.

The Hitmen's average attendance of roughly 28,000 fans per game was second-highest in the league, behind only the San Francisco Demons.

=== Revival ===
In December 2018, a revival of the XFL announced its intent to return to East Rutherford. The new team was named the New York Guardians.

== Season ==
Season records
Season	W	L	T	Finish	Playoff results
2001	4	6	0	3rd Eastern	Out of playoffs

=== Schedule ===
==== Regular season ====
Week	Date	Opponent	Result	Record	Venue	Attendance
1	February 3	at Las Vegas Outlaws	L 0–19	0–1	Sam Boyd Stadium	30,389
2	February 11	Birmingham Thunderbolts	L 12–19	0–2	Giants Stadium	36,458
3	February 18	Orlando Rage	L 12–18	0–3	Giants Stadium	25,626
4	February 24	at Chicago Enforcers	W 13–0	1–3	Soldier Field	24,052
5	March 3	Los Angeles Xtreme	L 7–22	1–4	Giants Stadium	27,479
6	March 11	at San Francisco Demons	W 20–12	2–4	Pacific Bell Park	33,522
7	March 17	Memphis Maniax	W 16–15	3–4	Giants Stadium	22,269
8	March 25	at Orlando Rage	L 12–17	3–5	Florida Citrus Bowl	19,641
9	March 31	Chicago Enforcers	L 18–23	3–6	Giants Stadium	29,713
10	April 8	at Birmingham Thunderbolts	W 22–0	4–6	Legion Field	10,749

== Standings ==
Eastern Division
Team	W	L	T	PCT	PF	PA	STK
Orlando Rage	8	2	0	.800	207	162	L1
Chicago Enforcers	5	5	0	.500	163	178	W1
New York/New Jersey Hitmen	4	6	0	.400	110	145	W1
Birmingham Thunderbolts	2	8	0	.200	131	217	L7

=== Roster ===
2001 New York/New Jersey Hitmen roster
Quarterbacks (QB): 7 Charles Puleri; 14 Wally Richardson; Running backs (RB): 28 Mike Archie; 38 Joe Aska; 27 Michael Blair; 24 Dino Philyaw; Wide receivers (WR): 85 Kirby Dar Dar; 80 Zola Davis; 29 Anthony DiCosmo; Tight ends (TE): 88 Ryan Collins; 87 Marcus Hinton; 86 Bob Rosenstiel	Offensive linemen (OL): 62 Ben Cavil G; 51 Eric Cole C; -- Harvey Goins; -- Robert Hunt C; 77 Curtis McGee T; 61 Juan Porter G; 64 Troy Stark G; Defensive linemen (DL): 92 James Cotton DE; 78 Christian Maumalanga DT; 92 Israel Raybon DE; 95 Dwayne Sabb DE; 70 Henry Slay DT	Linebackers (LB): 99 Vernon Crawford; 52 Haven Fields; 67 Ben Hanks; 57 Ron Merkerson; 60 Bernard Russ; Defensive backs (DB): 31 Butler By'not'e; 21 Donnie Caldwell; 26 Joey Eloms; 35 Tyree Talton; 34 Mark Tate; 30 Brad Trout; 17 Damen Wheeler; Special teams (ST): 2 Leo Araguz K/P	Practice squad: 90 Tim Beauchamp DE; 1 Chris Brantley WR; 81 Fred Brock WR; 91 Lamont Bryant DE; 50 David Camacho T; 11 Corte McGuffey QB; 46 Tawambi Settles DB; 66 Greg Vettorino G/C; Reserve: 22 Keith Elias FB; Rookies in italics, 7 practice squad

== Team leaders ==
Legend
Led the league

=== Passing ===
Passing statistics (Note: Archie and Davis threw one incompletion each)
NAME	GP	GS	Record	Cmp	Att	Pct	Yds	TD	Int	Rtg
Wally Richardson	7	5	3–2	83	142	58.5	812	6	6	71.1
Charles Puleri	6	3	0–3	29	64	45.3	411	2	2	64.0
Corte McGuffey	3	2	1–1	25	48	52.1	329	0	2	56.7
Zola Davis	—	—	—	1	1	100.0	74	1	0	158.3
Dino Philyaw	—	—	—	0	1	0.0	0	0	1	0.0
Totals	10	10	4–6	138	258	53.5	1,626	9	11	66.8

=== Rushing ===
Rushing statistics
NAME	Att	Yds	Avg	Lng	TD
Joe Aska	82	329	4.0	42	3
Keith Elias	37	115	3.1	28	0
Dino Philyaw	32	69	2.2	14	0
Wally Richardson	26	148	5.7	24	0
Mike Archie	17	42	2.5	7	2
Michael Blair	16	61	3.8	19	0
Corte McGuffey	8	33	4.1	8	0
Charles Puleri	8	-35	-4.4	3	0
Kirby Dar Dar	4	31	7.8	21	0
Leo Araguz	1	7	7.0	7	0
Fred Brock	1	0	0.0	0	0
Totals	232	800	3.4	42	5

=== Receiving ===
Receiving statistics
NAME	Rec	Yds	Avg	Lng	TD
Zola Davis	29	378	13.0	26	4
Anthony DiCosmo	26	268	10.4	30	0
Kirby Dar Dar	23	405	18.4	77t	2
Fred Brock	15	155	10.3	30	0
Mike Archie	12	125	10.4	33t	2
Michael Blair	10	73	7.3	14	0
Marcus Hinton	6	116	19.3	54	1
Joe Aska	6	24	4.0	12	0
Dino Philyaw	4	33	8.2	16	0
Keith Elias	4	0	0.0	7	0
Ryan Collins	3	38	12.7	23	0
Bob Rosenstiel	1	1	11.0	11	0
Totals	138	1,626	11.8	77	9

=== Scoring ===
7-17 (42.3)% on extra point conversion attempts

Total scoring
NAME	Rush	Rec	Return	XPM	FGM	PTS
Zola Davis	0	4	0	1	0	25
Mike Archie	2	2	0	0	0	24
Leo Araguz	0	0	0	0	7	21
Joe Aska	3	0	0	1	0	19
Kirby Dar Dar	0	2	0	0	0	12
Marcus Hinton	0	1	0	1	0	7
Donnie Caldwell	0	0	1	0	0	6
Joey Eloms	0	0	1	0	0	6
Ron Merkerson	0	0	1	0	0	6
Ryan Collins	0	0	0	3	0	3
Dino Philyaw	0	0	0	1	0	1
Totals	5	9	3	7	7	132

=== Scamble ===
The Hitmen won 8 of 10 scrambles. Donnie Caldwell had a 5–2 record. Chris Brantley went 3–0.

Scramble
Week	Hitmen	Opponent	NAME	Result
1	Donnie Caldwell (0–1)	@ LV	Jamel Williams (1–0)	L
2	Chris Brantley (1–0)	BIR	Tony McCall (0–1)	W
3	Chris Brantley (2–0)	ORL	Scott Cloman (1–1)	W
4	Chris Brantley (3–0)	@ CHI	Troy Saunders (1–2)	W
5	Donnie Caldwell (1–1)	LA	Donnell Day (1–1)	W
6	Donnie Caldwell (2–1)	@ SF	Lee Cole (unknown)	W
7	Donnie Caldwell (3–1)	MEM	Kevin Cobb (unknown)	W
8	Donnie Caldwell (3–2)	@ ORL	Scott Cloman (5–2)	L
9	Donnie Caldwell (4–2)	CHI	Tony McCall (2–3)	W
10	Donnie Caldwell (5–2)	BIR	Toya Jones (unknown)	W

== Staff ==
2001 New York/New Jersey Hitmen staff
Front office: Vice president/general manager – Drew Pearson; Director of operations – Joe Mack; Director of player personnel – David Catapano; Head coaches: Head coach – Rusty Tillman; Offensive coaches: Offensive coordinator/quarterbacks – Greg Briner; Running backs – Joe Lombardi; Tight ends/offensive line – Edwin Bailey	Defensive coaches: Defensive coordinator – David Catapano; Defensive line – Bill Urbanik; Linebackers – Tony Mottola; Secondary – Mike Dietzel; Special teams: Special teams coordinator – Paul Butcher; Head athletic trainer – Keith Abrams
