= Sam Hughes (American football) =

American football player (born 1970)

No. 11
- Position: Quarterback

Personal information
- Born: March 13, 1970 (age 56)
- Listed height: 6 ft 5 in (1.96 m)
- Listed weight: 220 lb (100 kg)

Career information
- High school: Santaluces (Lantana, Florida)
- College: Louisiana Tech (1988–1992)
- NFL draft: 1993: undrafted

Career history
- Las Vegas Posse (1993)*; Miami Hooters (1995); Milwaukee Mustangs (1996)
- * Offseason or practice squad member only

Career AFL statistics
- Comp. / Att.: 19 / 36
- Passing yards: 222
- TD–INT: 3–2
- QB rating: 69.44
- Stats at ArenaFan.com

Sam Hughes (born March 13, 1970) is an American former football quarterback. He played college football for the Louisiana Tech Bulldogs, and professionally for the Miami Hooters of the Arena Football League (AFL).

== Early life and college ==
Sam Hughes was born on March 13, 1970. He attended Santaluces Community High School in Lantana, Florida.

Hughes played college football for the Louisiana Tech Bulldogs of Louisiana Tech University from 1989 to 1992. He was redshirted in 1988. He was the backup to Gene Johnson from 1989 to 1991. Hughes completed 18 of 36 passes (50.0%) for 244 yards, three touchdowns, and two interceptions in 1989, 35 of 60 passes (58.3%) for 484 yards, three touchdowns, and two interceptions in 1990, and 50 completions of 76 passes (65.8%) for 630 yards, three touchdowns, and three interceptions in 1991. He took over as starter in 1992 after Johnson's departure. Hughes completed 64 of 149 passes (43.0%) for 849 yards, two touchdowns, and six interceptions during the 1992 season. He also missed part of the season due to injury.

== Professional career ==
Hughes had a workout with the Miami Dolphins of the National Football League in March 1993. In April 1993, the Waco Tribune-Herald had Hughes rated as the 37th best quarterback in the 1993 NFL draft. After going undrafted, he had another workout with the Dolphins in May 1993.

On May 16, 1994, it was reported that he had signed with the Las Vegas Posse of the Canadian Football League. He was waived on May 22, 1994. Hughes then played for the Shreveport Pelicans of the Professional Style Football League during the 1994 season.

Hughes signed with the Miami Hooters of the Arena Football League (AFL) in 1995. After former starter Mike Pawlawski was released, Hughes made his first AFL start on June 17, 1995, against the Orlando Predators. The Hooters lost by a score of 48–29. Overall, Hughes played in three games during the 1995 season, completing 19 of 36 passes (52.8%) for 222 yards, three touchdowns, and two interceptions. He was waived on January 25, 1996.

Hughes was claimed off waivers by the Milwaukee Mustangs on January 26, 1996. He was placed on recallable waivers on April 25, 1996.

== Personal life ==
Hughes' father, Gary Hughes, was an executive and scout in Major League Baseball.
