= Tim Hall (American football) =

American football player (1974–1998)

No. 45
- Position: Running back

Personal information
- Born: February 15, 1974; Kansas City, Missouri, U.S.
- Died: September 30, 1998 (aged 24); Kansas City, Missouri, U.S.
- Listed height: 5 ft 11 in (1.80 m)
- Listed weight: 218 lb (99 kg)

Career information
- High school: Northeast (Kansas City, Missouri)
- College: Robert Morris
- NFL draft: 1996: 6th round, 183rd overall pick

Career history
- Oakland Raiders (1996–1997)

Career NFL statistics
- Rushing attempts: 26
- Rushing yards: 127
- Rushing touchdowns: 0
- Receptions: 1
- Receiving yards: 9
- Receiving touchdowns: 0
- Stats at Pro Football Reference

Timothy Hall (February 15, 1974 – September 30, 1998) was an American professional football running back in the National Football League (NFL) who played for the Oakland Raiders. He played college football at Kemper Military School and for the Robert Morris Colonials.

== Career ==
In 1994, Hall rushed for 1,336 yards 11 touchdowns with an NCAA best 8.7 yards per carry. Hall also caught 26 passes for 460 yards and 3 touchdowns. In 1995, he rushed for 1,572 yards and 16 touchdowns and also caught 31 passes for 333 yards and 3 touchdowns.

Hall was selected in the 6th round of the NFL draft by the Oakland Raiders. He was the first player drafted from Robert Morris University and the first football player to have his jersey number (#45) retired at Robert Morris.

Hall spent two seasons with the Raiders before being cut in preseason of the 1998 season. After this he worked out for several teams and, according to his agent, was close to choosing his next team when he was killed.

== Death ==
Hall was shot to death on September 30, 1998. Hall was in a car with a childhood friend, who was apparently targeted for an unknown reason. As of December 2020 the case is still unsolved. A tribute to Hall was held at Robert Morris University in the weeks after his murder.
