= Troy Stark =

American football player (1973–2001)

No. 64
- Position: Offensive lineman

Personal information
- Born: January 2, 1973; Canandaigua, New York, U.S.
- Died: June 1, 2001 (aged 28); Peachtree City, Georgia, U.S.
- Listed height: 6 ft 7 in (2.01 m)
- Listed weight: 310 lb (141 kg)

Career information
- College: Georgia
- NFL draft: 1996: undrafted

Career history
- Green Bay Packers (1996)*; New York Jets (1996–1997)*; New York/New Jersey Hitmen (2001)
- * Offseason or practice squad member only

Awards and highlights
- Second-team All-SEC (1995)

Troy Stark (January 2, 1973 – June 1, 2001) was an American football offensive lineman. He was signed by the Green Bay Packers as an undrafted free agent in 1996. He was traded to the New York Jets during training camp and was released during training camp in 1997. He also played for the New York/New Jersey Hitmen of the XFL in 2001. He played in college at the University of Georgia. Stark died on June 1, 2001, due to complications from a blood clot following knee surgery. The blood clot was thought to have jarred loose during intense physical therapy and it then travelled to his lungs.

== See also ==
- List of gridiron football players who died during their careers
