= Henry Bailey (American football) =

American football player (born 1973)

No. 82, 85
- Position: Wide receiver

Personal information
- Born: February 28, 1973 (age 53); Suffolk, Virginia, U.S.
- Listed height: 5 ft 8 in (1.73 m)
- Listed weight: 176 lb (80 kg)

Career information
- High school: Kennedy (Chicago, Illinois)
- College: UNLV
- NFL draft: 1995: 7th round, 235th overall pick

Career history
- Pittsburgh Steelers (1995)*; Buffalo Bills (1996)*; New York Jets (1996); Pittsburgh Steelers (1997–1998)
- * Offseason or practice squad member only

Career NFL statistics
- Receptions: 5
- Receiving yards: 65
- Return yards: 470
- Stats at Pro Football Reference

Henry Charles Bailey Jr. (born February 28, 1973) is an American former professional football player who was a wide receiver in the National Football League (NFL). He played college football for the UNLV Rebels and was selected by the Pittsburgh Steelers in the seventh round of the 1995 NFL draft with the 235th overall pick.
