= Eddie Anderson (safety) =

American football player (born 1963)

No. 47, 33
- Position: Safety

Personal information
- Born: July 22, 1963 (age 63); Warner Robins, Georgia, U.S.
- Listed height: 6 ft 1 in (1.85 m)
- Listed weight: 200 lb (91 kg)

Career information
- High school: Warner Robins
- College: Fort Valley State
- NFL draft: 1986: 6th round, 153rd overall pick

Career history
- Seattle Seahawks (1986); Los Angeles / Oakland Raiders (1987–1997)

Career NFL statistics
- Tackles: 813
- Interceptions: 19
- Sacks: 4
- Stats at Pro Football Reference

Eddie Lee Anderson Jr. (born July 22, 1963) is an American former professional football player who was a safety in the National Football League (NFL). He played college football for the Fort Valley State and was selected by the Seattle Seahawks in the sixth round of the 1986 NFL draft.

Anderson also played for the Oakland Raiders. With the Raiders, Anderson set the team record for longest interception return against the Miami Dolphins in 1992, scoring on a 102-yard return.
