= Mike Archie =

American football player (born 1972)

No. 32, 22, 28
- Position: Running back

Personal information
- Born: October 14, 1972 (age 54); Sharon, Pennsylvania, U.S.
- Listed height: 5 ft 8 in (1.73 m)
- Listed weight: 205 lb (93 kg)

Career information
- College: Penn State
- NFL draft: 1996: 7th round, 218th overall pick

Career history
- Houston Oilers/Tennessee Titans (1996–1999); New York/New Jersey Hitmen (2001)

Career NFL statistics
- Rushing yards: 24
- Rushing touchdowns: 1
- Receiving yards: 25
- Punt return yards: 57
- Kickoff return yards: 961
- Stats at Pro Football Reference

Michael Lamont Archie (born October 14, 1972) is an American former professional football player who was a running back in the National Football League (NFL) and XFL. He played college football for the Penn State Nittany Lions.

== College career ==
As a tailback at Penn State University, Archie rushed for 1,830 yards and 14 touchdowns. His 77 receptions for eight touchdowns is a school record for running backs. He was a key contributor in the Nittany Lions' 1993 Citrus Bowl and 1994 Rose Bowl victory, the latter of which capped an undefeated season for the Nittany Lions.

He earned his Bachelor of Science in Hotel Restaurant and Institutional Management from the university in 1996.

== Professional career ==
Archie was the seventh round draft pick (#218 overall) of the Houston Oilers in 1996. He played for the Oilers/Tennessee Titans for three seasons, including 16 games in the 1998 season. He spent the 1999 season on injured reserve and negotiated an injury settlement and release from the Titans. He played with the New York/New Jersey Hitmen of the newly formed XFL for their only season in 2001.

== Personal life ==
Archie lives in Brentwood, Tennessee with his wife, Crystal, and their seven children. He and Crystal are representatives for Rodan and Fields today and are active in the community

== Trivia ==
- Nickname is "Spanky"'
- He is best remembered for his comment during Super Bowl XXXIV, "Just gimme the ball, Coach! Just gimme the ball!"
- Was named 1992 Pennsylvania Player of the Year by USA Today as senior at Sharon High School in Sharon, Pennsylvania.
- Inducted into the Mercer County Hall of Fame in 2020.
