= Jeff Kysar =

American football player (born 1972)

No. 79
- Position: Tackle

Personal information
- Born: June 14, 1972 (age 54); Norman, Oklahoma, U.S.
- Listed height: 6 ft 7 in (2.01 m)
- Listed weight: 320 lb (145 kg)

Career information
- High school: San Diego (CA) Junipero Serra
- College: Arizona State
- NFL draft: 1995: 5th round, 154th overall pick

Career history
- Oakland Raiders (1995-1996)

Awards and highlights
- Second-team All-Pac-10 (1994)
- Stats at Pro Football Reference

Jeff Kysar (born June 14, 1972) is an American former professional football player who was a tackle for the Oakland Raiders of the National Football League (NFL) in 1995. He played college football for the Arizona State Sun Devils.
