= Marcus Hinton =

American football player (born 1971)

No. 85, 87
- Position: Tight end

Personal information
- Born: December 27, 1971 (age 54); Wiggins, Mississippi, U.S.
- Listed height: 6 ft 4 in (1.93 m)
- Listed weight: 260 lb (118 kg)

Career information
- High school: Stone (Wiggins)
- College: Alcorn State (1991–1994)
- NFL draft: 1995: undrafted

Career history
- Oakland Raiders (1995–1996); New Orleans Saints (1998)*; Oakland Raiders (1999)*; → Berlin Thunder (1999); New York/New Jersey Hitmen (2001)
- * Offseason or practice squad member only

Awards and highlights
- First-team All-SWAC (1993)
- Stats at Pro Football Reference

Marcus H. Hinton (born December 27, 1971) is an American former professional football tight end who played one season with the Oakland Raiders of the National Football League (NFL). He played college football at Alcorn State University. He also played for the Berlin Thunder of NFL Europe and the New York/New Jersey Hitmen of the XFL.

== Early life ==
Marcus H. Hinton was born on December 27, 1971, in Wiggins, Mississippi. He attended Stone High School in Wiggins.

== College career ==
Hinton was a member of the Alcorn State Braves of Alcorn State University from 1991 to 1994 and a three-year letterman from 1992 to 1994. He caught 30 passes for 737 yards and 11 touchdowns in 1992, earning Southwestern Athletic Conference (SWAC) Newcomer of the Year honors. Hinton recorded 41 receptions for 807 receiving yards and seven touchdowns in 1993, leading the SWAC in all three categories while also garnering first-team All-SWAC recognition. As a senior in 1994, he caught 44 passes for 878 yards and eight touchdowns. He made a school-record 316 single-game receiving yards that year in a 54–28 win against Tennessee-Chattanooga. Overall, Hinton totaled 112 receptions for 2,392 yards and a school-record 26 touchdowns during his college career. He was inducted into the school's athletics hall of fame in 2006.

== Professional career ==
Hinton signed with the Oakland Raiders after going undrafted in the 1995 NFL draft. He was released on August 26 and signed to the practice squad two days later. He was promoted to the active roster on December 9, 1995, but did not appear in any games that season. Hinton later played in two games for the Raiders during the 1996 season. He was released on August 24, 1997. During the 1997 NFL regular season, he worked at a sawmill in his hometown of Wiggins.

Hinton signed a futures contract with the New Orleans Saints on December 23, 1997. He was released on August 24, 1998.

Hinton was signed by the Raiders again on January 14, 1999. He was then allocated to NFL Europe to play for the Berlin Thunder. He caught seven passes for 71 yards and one touchdown for the Thunder that year. Hinton was released by the Raiders on September 5, 1999.

Hinton played in nine games, starting six, for the New York/New Jersey Hitmen of the XFL in 2001, recording six receptions for 116 yards and a touchdown.
