= Joe Aska =

American football player (born 1972)

No. 35, 38
- Position: Running back

Personal information
- Born: July 14, 1972 (age 54); Saint Croix, U.S. Virgin Islands
- Listed height: 5 ft 11 in (1.80 m)
- Listed weight: 240 lb (109 kg)

Career information
- High school: Warr Acres (OK) Putnam City
- College: Central Oklahoma
- NFL draft: 1995: 3rd round, 86th overall pick

Career history
- Oakland Raiders (1995–1997); Amsterdam Admirals (1999); Indianapolis Colts (1999)*; New York/New Jersey Hitmen (2001)
- * Offseason or practice squad member only

Career NFL statistics
- Rushing yards: 336
- Rushing average: 4.5
- Receptions: 8
- Receiving yards: 63
- Total touchdowns: 1
- Stats at Pro Football Reference

Joe Aska (born July 14, 1972) is a former American football running back who played for the Oakland Raiders and the Indianapolis Colts of the National Football League (NFL), as well as the New York/New Jersey Hitmen of the XFL.

== High school and college career ==
Aska was an all-district tailback at Putnam City High School, where he also lettered in basketball and track & field. He won state titles in the 100 meters and 200 meters races. He then attended the University of Central Oklahoma. In 1994, as a junior, he led the Lone Star Conference in rushing with 1,629 yards and 15 touchdowns. He was also a finalist for the Harlon Hill Trophy, the award given to the best football player in Division II.

== National Football League career ==
Aska was drafted in the third round (86th overall) of the 1995 NFL draft by the Oakland Raiders. After sitting out most of his rookie season, he played in the last game of the 1995 NFL season against the Denver Broncos. He was the primary backup to Napoleon Kaufman the following season, and started two games. After one more season with the Raiders, he signed with the Indianapolis Colts for the 1999 season. However, he did not see any playing time with the Colts, and was subsequently cut. He finished his NFL career with 74 carries for 326 yards and a touchdown. He later joined the New York/New Jersey Hitmen of the XFL. He led the team in rushing with 329 yards on 82 carries, and posted 5 touchdowns.
