= 1999 Oakland Raiders season =

NFL team season

- Owner: Al Davis
- General manager: Al Davis
- Head coach: Jon Gruden
- Offensive coordinator: Bill Callahan
- Defensive coordinator: Willie Shaw
- Home stadium: Network Associates Coliseum

Results
- Record: 8–8
- Division place: 4th AFC West
- Playoffs: Did not qualify
- Pro Bowlers: Rich Gannon, QB; Tim Brown, WR; Darrell Russell, DT; Charles Woodson, CB

The 1999 season was the Oakland Raiders' 30th in the National Football League (NFL), their 40th overall, their fifth season since returning to Oakland, and their second season under head coach Jon Gruden. They matched their previous season's output of 8–8. Thirteen of the team's sixteen games were decided by a touchdown or less, and none of the Raiders' eight losses were by more than a touchdown.

The season saw the team acquire quarterback Rich Gannon, who had his best seasons with the Raiders, being named MVP in 2002 and leading the team to a Super Bowl, that same season. His following two seasons after the Super Bowl were marred by injuries and he was forced to retire in 2004. Gannon was named to four consecutive Pro Bowls (1999–2002) while playing for the Raiders.

== Offseason ==
=== NFL draft ===
1999 Oakland Raiders draft
Round	Pick	Player	Position	College	Notes
1	18	Matt Stinchcomb	Offensive Tackle	Georgia	
2	40	Tony Bryant	Defensive end	Florida	
4	102	Dameane Douglas	Wide receiver	California	from Chicago
5	146	Eric Barton	Linebacker	Maryland	from Pittsburgh
5	153	Rod Coleman	Defensive tackle	East Carolina	
6	188	Daren Yancey	Defensive tackle	BYU	from Oakland via Green Bay
7	224	JoJuan Armour	Safety	Miami (OH)	
Made roster

== Staff ==
1999 Oakland Raiders staff
Front office: Principal Owner / President of the General Partner – Al Davis; Senior Executive – John Herrera; Head coaches: Head coach – Jon Gruden; Coaches' assistant – Paul Kelly; Offensive coaches: Offensive coordinator/offensive line – Bill Callahan; Quarterbacks – Gary Stevens; Running backs – Skip Peete; Wide receivers – Fred Biletnikoff; Tight ends – Jim Erkenbeck; Offensive quality control – David Shaw	Defensive coaches: Defensive coordinator – Willie Shaw; Defensive line – Mike Waufle; Linebackers – Dave Adolph; Linebackers – Robin Ross; Defensive backs – Chuck Bresnahan; Assistant defensive backs/director of squad development – Willie Brown; Defensive assistant – Woodrow Lowe; Defensive quality control – Don Martin; Special teams coaches: Special teams – Frank Gansz Jr; Strength and conditioning: Strength and conditioning – Garrett Giemont

== Roster ==
1999 Oakland Raiders roster
Quarterbacks (QB): 10 Scott Dreisbach; 12 Rich Gannon; 14 Bobby Hoying; 16 Wade Wilson; Running backs (RB): 32 Zack Crockett; 28 Randy Jordan; 26 Napoleon Kaufman; 40 Jon Ritchie FB; 47 Tyrone Wheatley; 34 Jermaine Williams FB; Wide receivers (WR): 81 Tim Brown; 80 Horace Copeland; 82 James Jett; 85 Terry Mickens; 84 Kenny Shedd; 89 Rodney Williams; Tight ends (TE): 87 Jeremy Brigham; 83 Rickey Dudley	Offensive linemen (OL): 73 Darryl Ashmore G; 64 Gennaro DiNapoli G; 72 Lincoln Kennedy T; 70 Tim Kohn T; 71 Nathan Parks T; 63 Barret Robbins C; 65 Barry Sims G; 66 Barry Stokes G; 62 Adam Treu C; 76 Steve Wisniewski G; Defensive linemen (DL): 91 Rod Coleman DT; 93 James Harris DE; 90 Grady Jackson DT; 51 Lance Johnstone DE; 67 Russell Maryland DT; 98 Chuck Osborne DT; 96 Darrell Russell DT	Linebackers (LB): 50 Eric Barton OLB; 54 Greg Biekert MLB; 55 Bobby Brooks MLB; 52 Richard Harvey OLB; 53 Travian Smith OLB; 56 Sam Sword OLB; Defensive backs (DB): 21 Eric Allen CB; 27 Calvin Branch SS; 23 Darrien Gordon CB; 44 Johnnie Harris SS; 22 Charles Mincy FS; 30 Anthony Newman SS; 42 Marcus Ray FS; 38 Marquis Walker CB; 24 Charles Woodson CB; Special teams (ST): 2 Leo Araguz P; 5 Michael Husted K; 6 Joe Nedney K	Practice squad: 39 Marlon Barnes RB; 77 Eric Moss G; 88 Shannon Myers WR; 15 Gerald Williams WR; Reserve: 94 Tony Bryant DE (IR); 79 Mo Collins T (IR); 74 Matt Stinchcomb T (IR); 29 Eric Turner S (IR); 86 Derrick Walker TE (IR); Rookies in italics 53 active, 5 reserve, 4 practice squad

== Schedule ==
Week	Date	Opponent	Result	Record	Venue	Attendance
1	September 12	at Green Bay Packers	**L** 24–28	0–1	Lambeau Field	59,872
2	September 19	at Minnesota Vikings	**W** 22–17	1–1	Hubert H. Humphrey Metrodome	64,080
3	September 26	Chicago Bears	**W** 24–17	2–1	Network Associates Coliseum	50,458
4	October 3	at **Seattle Seahawks**	**L** 21–22	2–2	Kingdome	66,400
5	October 10	**Denver Broncos**	**L** 13–16	2–3	Network Associates Coliseum	55,704
6	October 17	at Buffalo Bills	**W** 20–14	3–3	Ralph Wilson Stadium	71,113
7	October 24	New York Jets	**W** 24–23	4–3	Network Associates Coliseum	47,326
8	October 31	Miami Dolphins	**L** 9–16	4–4	Network Associates Coliseum	61,556
9	Bye					
10	November 14	**San Diego Chargers**	**W** 28–9	5–4	Network Associates Coliseum	43,353
11	November 22	at **Denver Broncos**	**L** 21–27 (OT)	5–5	Mile High Stadium	70,012
12	November 28	**Kansas City Chiefs**	**L** 34–37	5–6	Network Associates Coliseum	48,632
13	December 5	**Seattle Seahawks**	**W** 30–21	6–6	Network Associates Coliseum	44,716
14	December 9	at Tennessee Titans	**L** 14–21	6–7	Adelphia Coliseum	66,357
15	December 19	Tampa Bay Buccaneers	**W** 45–0	7–7	Network Associates Coliseum	46,395
16	December 26	at **San Diego Chargers**	**L** 20–23	7–8	Qualcomm Stadium	63,846
17	January 2, 2000	at **Kansas City Chiefs**	**W** 41–38 (OT)	8–8	Arrowhead Stadium	79,026
Note: Intra-division opponents are in **bold** text.

== Standings ==
AFC West
	W	L	T	PCT	PF	PA	STK
^{(3)} Seattle Seahawks	9	7	0	.563	338	298	L1
Kansas City Chiefs	9	7	0	.563	390	322	L2
San Diego Chargers	8	8	0	.500	269	316	W2
Oakland Raiders	8	8	0	.500	390	329	W1
Denver Broncos	6	10	0	.375	314	318	L1
