= 1998 Oakland Raiders season =

NFL team season

- Owner: Al Davis
- General manager: Al Davis
- Head coach: Jon Gruden
- Home stadium: Network Associates Coliseum (Note: Formerly known as the Oakland-Alameda County Coliseum until September 25, 1998)

Results
- Record: 8–8
- Division place: 2nd AFC West
- Playoffs: Did not qualify
- Pro Bowlers: Darrell Russell, DT; Steve Wisniewski, G Charles Woodson, CB

The 1998 Oakland Raiders season was their 39th in franchise history, and 29th in the National Football League (NFL). It was also their first season under head coach Jon Gruden. They improved upon their previous season's output of 4–12, winning eight games. This was the team's fifth consecutive season in which they failed to qualify for the playoffs. Once again, the Raiders failed to make the playoffs despite starting with a 6–2 record.

The season saw the Raiders draft Heisman Trophy winner Charles Woodson. He made an immediate impact and was named to the Pro Bowl following the season.

== Offseason ==
=== NFL draft ===
1998 Oakland Raiders draft
| Round | Pick | Player | Position | College | Notes |
| 1 | 4 | Charles Woodson * | Cornerback | Michigan | |
| 1 | 23 | Mo Collins | Guard | Florida | from Tampa Bay |
| 2 | 31 | Leon Bender | Defensive tackle | Washington State | |
| 3 | 63 | Jon Ritchie | Fullback | Stanford | |
| 4 | 109 | Gennaro DiNapoli | Guard | Virginia Tech | from Washington |
| 5 | 127 | Jeremy Brigham | Tight end | Washington | |
| 5 | 152 | Travian Smith | Linebacker | Oklahoma | |
Made roster

== Staff ==
1998 Oakland Raiders Staff
| Front Office: Principal Owner / President of the General Partner – Al Davis; Senior Executive – John Herrera; Head coaches: Head coach – Jon Gruden; Coaches’ Assistant – Paul Kelly; Offensive coaches: Offensive coordinator/tight ends – Bill Callahan; Quarterbacks – Gary Stevens; Running backs – Skip Peete; Wide receivers – Fred Biletnikoff; Offensive line – Keith Rowen; Offensive assistant – Robert Jenkins; Quality control – David Shaw | Defensive coaches: Defensive line – Willie Shaw; Defensive line – Mike Waufle; Linebackers – Dave Adolph; Defensive backs – Chuck Bresnahan; Assistant defensive backs/director of squad development – Willie Brown; Defensive quality control – Don Martin; Special teams coaches: Special teams – Frank Gansz Jr; Strength and conditioning: Strength and conditioning – Garrett Giemont |

== Roster ==
1998 Oakland Raiders roster
| Quarterbacks (QB): 4 Pat Barnes; 3 Jeff George; 12 Donald Hollas; 16 Wade Wilson; Running backs (RB): 28 Randy Jordan; 26 Napoleon Kaufman; 40 Jon Ritchie FB; 22 Harvey Williams; 34 Jermaine Williams; Wide receivers (WR): 81 Tim Brown; 80 Desmond Howard; 82 James Jett; 85 Terry Mickens; 84 Kenny Shedd; 89 Rodney Williams; Tight ends (TE): 87 Jeremy Brigham; 86 Derek Brown; 83 Rickey Dudley | Offensive linemen (OL): 73 Darryl Ashmore G; 79 Mo Collins T; 68 Rick Cunningham G; 64 Gennaro DiNapoli C; 72 Lincoln Kennedy T; 63 Barret Robbins C; 62 Adam Treu C/LS; 78 Bruce Wilkerson T; 76 Steve Wisniewski G; Defensive linemen (DL): 92 Vince Amey DE; 99 Aundray Bruce DE; 93 James Harris DE; 90 Grady Jackson DT; 51 Lance Johnstone DE; 67 Russell Maryland DT; 96 Darrell Russell DT; 56 Pat Swilling DE | Linebackers (LB): 54 Greg Biekert MLB; 55 James Folston OLB; 52 Richard Harvey OLB; 50 Mike Morton OLB; 53 Travian Smith OLB; 57 Terry Wooden OLB; Defensive backs (DB): 27 Calvin Branch CB; 33 Bucky Brooks CB; 20 Perry Carter CB; 29 Albert Lewis FS; 30 Anthony Newman SS; 41 Louis Riddick SS; 37 James Trapp CB; 42 Eric Turner FS; 38 Marquis Walker CB; 24 Charles Woodson CB; Special teams (ST): 2 Leo Araguz P; 7 Greg Davis K | Practice squad: 95 Ta'ase Faumui DE; 70 Tim Kohn G; 35 Reynard Rutherford RB; Reserve: 21 Eric Allen CB (IR); 74 Derrick Graham G (IR); 77 Pat Harlow T (IR); 98 Chuck Osborne DT (IR); 66 Curtis Whitley C (Susp.); Rookies in italics 53 active, 5 reserve, 3 practice squad |

== Schedule ==
| Week | Date | Opponent | Result | Record | Venue | Attendance |
|---|---|---|---|---|---|---|
| 1 | September 6 | at **Kansas City Chiefs** | **L** 8–28 | 0–1 | Arrowhead Stadium | 78,945 |
| 2 | September 13 | New York Giants | **W** 20–17 | 1–1 | Oakland–Alameda County Coliseum | 40,545 |
| 3 | September 20 | **Denver Broncos** | **L** 17–34 | 1–2 | Oakland–Alameda County Coliseum | 56,578 |
| 4 | September 27 | at Dallas Cowboys | **W** 13–12 | 2–2 | Texas Stadium | 63,544 |
| 5 | October 4 | at Arizona Cardinals | **W** 23–20 | 3–2 | Sun Devil Stadium | 52,178 |
| 6 | October 11 | **San Diego Chargers** | **W** 7–6 | 4–2 | Network Associates Coliseum | 42,467 |
| 7 | Bye | | | | | |
| 8 | October 25 | Cincinnati Bengals | **W** 27–10 | 5–2 | Network Associates Coliseum | 40,089 |
| 9 | November 1 | at **Seattle Seahawks** | **W** 31–18 | 6–2 | Kingdome | 66,246 |
| 10 | November 8 | at Baltimore Ravens | **L** 10–13 | 6–3 | Ravens Stadium | 69,037 |
| 11 | November 15 | **Seattle Seahawks** | **W** 20–17 | 7–3 | Network Associates Coliseum | 51,527 |
| 12 | November 22 | at **Denver Broncos** | **L** 14–40 | 7–4 | Mile High Stadium | 75,325 |
| 13 | November 29 | Washington Redskins | **L** 19–29 | 7–5 | Network Associates Coliseum | 41,409 |
| 14 | December 6 | Miami Dolphins | **L** 17–27 | 7–6 | Network Associates Coliseum | 61,254 |
| 15 | December 13 | at Buffalo Bills | **L** 21–44 | 7–7 | Ralph Wilson Stadium | 62,002 |
| 16 | December 20 | at **San Diego Chargers** | **W** 17–10 | 8–7 | Qualcomm Stadium | 60,716 |
| 17 | December 26 | **Kansas City Chiefs** | **L** 24–31 | 8–8 | Network Associates Coliseum | 52,679 |
Note: Intra-division opponents are in **bold** text.

== Standings ==
AFC West
| | W | L | T | PCT | PF | PA | STK |
|---|---|---|---|---|---|---|---|
| ^{(1)} Denver Broncos | 14 | 2 | 0 | .875 | 501 | 309 | W1 |
| Oakland Raiders | 8 | 8 | 0 | .500 | 288 | 356 | L1 |
| Seattle Seahawks | 8 | 8 | 0 | .500 | 372 | 310 | L1 |
| Kansas City Chiefs | 7 | 9 | 0 | .438 | 327 | 363 | W1 |
| San Diego Chargers | 5 | 11 | 0 | .313 | 241 | 342 | L5 |
