= 1997 Oakland Raiders season =

NFL team season

- Owner: Al Davis
- General manager: Al Davis
- Head coach: Joe Bugel
- Home stadium: Oakland–Alameda County Coliseum

Results
- Record: 4–12
- Division place: 4th AFC West
- Playoffs: Did not qualify
- Pro Bowlers: Darrell Russell DT; Tim Brown WR

The 1997 season was the Oakland Raiders' 28th in the National Football League, their 38th overall, their 3rd since their return to Oakland, and their first under head coach Joe Bugel. They failed to improve upon their 7–9 from 1996 and finished with a 4–12 record, the worst finish for the Raiders since 1962; when they won only once in the final season before the arrival of Al Davis. The Raiders missed the playoffs for the fourth consecutive season.

== Offseason ==
=== NFL draft ===
- 1 Darrell Russell DT
- 3 Adam Treu C
- 3 Tim Kohn OT
- 4 Chad Levitt RB
- 6 Calvin Branch CB
- 6 Grady Jackson DT

=== Staff / Coaches ===
1997 Oakland Raiders staff
Front office: Principal Owner / President of the General Partner – Al Davis; Senior Executive – John Herrera; Head coaches: Head coach – Joe Bugel; Offensive coaches: Offensive coordinator – Ray Perkins; Quarterbacks – Bill Musgrave; Running backs – Bishop Harris; Wide receivers – Fred Biletnikoff; Offensive line – Keith Rowen; Offensive assistant – Robert Jenkins	Defensive coaches: Defensive line – Bill Urbanik; Linebackers – Dave Adolph; Linebackers – Fred Whittingham; Defensive backs – Steve Shafer; Assistant defensive backs – Willie Brown; Defensive assistant – Kevin Spencer; Defensive assistant – John Guy; Special teams coaches: Special Teams – Rusty Tillman; Strength and conditioning: Strength and conditioning – Garrett Giemont

== Roster ==
1997 Oakland Raiders roster
Quarterbacks (QB): 3 Jeff George; 12 Donald Hollas; 7 David Klingler; Running backs (RB): 35 Joe Aska; 48 Jerone Davison; 45 Tim Hall; 26 Napoleon Kaufman; 31 Chad Levitt; Wide receivers (WR): 81 Tim Brown; 80 Desmond Howard; 82 James Jett; 84 Kenny Shedd; 88 Olanda Truitt; Tight ends (TE): 83 Rickey Dudley; 87 John Henry Mills; 89 Bob Rosenstiel	Offensive linemen (OL): 68 Rick Cunningham G/T; 77 Pat Harlow T; 71 Lester Holmes G; 72 Lincoln Kennedy T; 70 Tim Kohn G/T; 63 Barret Robbins C; 62 Adam Treu C; 78 Scott Whittaker T; 66 Curtis Whitley G; 76 Steve Wisniewski G; Defensive linemen (DL): 56 Aundray Bruce DE; 95 Ta'ase Faumui DE; 90 Grady Jackson DT; 98 Kevin Johnson DT; 51 Lance Johnstone DE; 97 Russell Maryland DT; 91 Chester McGlockton DT; 96 Darrell Russell DE; 94 Anthony Smith DE	Linebackers (LB): 54 Greg Biekert MLB; 55 James Folston OLB; 53 Rob Fredrickson OLB; 57 Rob Holmberg OLB; 52 Shay Muirbrook MLB; 59 Aaron Wallace OLB; Defensive backs (DB): 33 Eddie Anderson FS; 27 Calvin Branch CB/S; 24 Larry Brown CB; 20 Perry Carter CB; 25 Dan Land FS; 43 Lorenzo Lynch SS; 36 Terry McDaniel CB; 37 James Trapp SS; 42 Eric Turner FS; 23 Lionel Washington CB; Special teams (ST): 2 Leo Araguz P; 5 Cole Ford K	Practice squad: 46 Kenyan Branscomb S; 93 Shatony Sargeant DE; Reserve: 44 Derrick Fenner RB (IR); 29 Albert Lewis CB (IR); 50 Mike Morton LB (IR); 22 Harvey Williams RB (IR); 53 active, 4 inactive, 2 practice squad Rookies in italics

== Regular season ==
=== Schedule ===
Week	Date	Opponent	Result	Record	Venue	Attendance
1	August 31	at Tennessee Oilers	**L** 21–24 (OT)	0–1	Liberty Bowl Memorial Stadium	30,171
2	September 8	Kansas City Chiefs	**L** 27–28	0–2	Oakland–Alameda County Coliseum	61,523
3	September 14	at Atlanta Falcons	**W** 36–31	1–2	Georgia Dome	47,922
4	September 21	at New York Jets	**L** 22–23	1–3	Giants Stadium	72,586
5	September 28	St. Louis Rams	**W** 35–17	2–3	Oakland–Alameda County Coliseum	42,506
6	October 5	**San Diego Chargers**	**L** 10–25	2–4	Oakland–Alameda County Coliseum	43,648
7	Bye					
8	October 19	**Denver Broncos**	**W** 28–25	3–4	Oakland–Alameda County Coliseum	57,006
9	October 26	at **Seattle Seahawks**	**L** 34–45	3–5	Kingdome	66,264
10	November 2	at Carolina Panthers	**L** 14–38	3–6	Ericcson Stadium	71,064
11	November 9	New Orleans Saints	**L** 10–13	3–7	Oakland–Alameda County Coliseum	40,091
12	November 16	at San Diego Chargers	**W** 38–13	4–7	Qualcomm Stadium	65,714
13	November 24	at **Denver Broncos**	**L** 3–31	4–8	Mile High Stadium	75,307
14	November 30	Miami Dolphins	**L** 16–34	4–9	Oakland–Alameda County Coliseum	50,569
15	December 7	at **Kansas City Chiefs**	**L** 0–30	4–10	Arrowhead Stadium	76,379
16	December 14	**Seattle Seahawks**	**L** 21–22	4–11	Oakland–Alameda County Coliseum	40,124
17	December 21	Jacksonville Jaguars	**L** 9–20	4–12	Oakland–Alameda County Coliseum	40,032
Note: Intra-division opponents are in **bold** text.

=== Game summaries ===
==== Week 12 ====
Team	1	2	3	4	Total
• Raiders	7	14	14	3	38
Chargers	7	6	0	0	13

- Date: November 16
- Location: Qualcomm Stadium, San Diego, California
- Game start: 5:00 p.m.
- Game weather: 61 °F (16 °C); wind 6 mph (9.7 km/h)
- TV announcers (ESPN): Mike Patrick, Joe Theismann and Ron Jaworski

Scoring summary
Q1	SD	Greg Jackson 36 yard interception return (Greg Davis kick)	SD 7–0
Q1	OAK	Harvey Williams 8 yard pass from Jeff George (Cole Ford kick)	Tie 7–7
Q2	OAK	Harvey Williams 1 yard run (Cole Ford kick)	OAK 14–7
Q2	SD	Greg Davis 45 yard field goal	OAK 14–10
Q2	OAK	James Jett 9 yard pass from Jeff George (Cole Ford kick)	OAK 21–10
Q2	SD	Greg Davis 22 yard field goal	OAK 21–13
Q3	OAK	Harvey Williams 1 yard run (Cole Ford kick)	OAK 28–13
Q3	OAK	Harvey Williams 32 yard pass from Jeff George (Cole Ford kick)	OAK 35–13
Q4	OAK	Cole Ford 23 yard field goal	OAK 38–13

== Standings ==
AFC West
	W	L	T	PCT	PF	PA	STK
^{(1)} Kansas City Chiefs	13	3	0	.813	375	232	W6
^{(4)} Denver Broncos	12	4	0	.750	472	287	W1
Seattle Seahawks	8	8	0	.500	365	362	W2
Oakland Raiders	4	12	0	.250	324	419	L5
San Diego Chargers	4	12	0	.250	266	425	L8

== Awards and records ==
- Tim Brown, single game record, 14 receptions, achieved on December 21
- Napoleon Kaufman, single game record, 227 rushing yards, achieved on October 19
- Harvey Williams, single game record, 4 touchdowns (tied club record), achieved on November 16
- Napoleon Kaufman, single game record, 24 points, (tied club record), achieved on November 16
- Jeff George, single season record, most passing yards in one season, 3,917
- Tim Brown, single season record, most receptions in one season, 104
- Tim Brown, single season record, most receiving yards in one season, 1,408

=== Milestones ===
- Tim Brown, 1st Raider to have 100 receptions in a season
