= Darrell Russell (American football) =

American football player (1976–2005)

No. 96
- Position: Defensive tackle

Personal information
- Born: May 27, 1976; Pensacola, Florida, U.S.
- Died: December 15, 2005 (aged 29); Los Angeles, California, U.S.
- Listed height: 6 ft 5 in (1.96 m)
- Listed weight: 325 lb (147 kg)

Career information
- High school: San Diego (CA) St. Augustine
- College: USC
- NFL draft: 1997: 1st round, 2nd overall pick

Career history
- Oakland Raiders (1997–2003); Washington Redskins (2003); Tampa Bay Buccaneers (2004)*
- * Offseason or practice squad member only

Awards and highlights
- First-team All-Pro (1998); Second-team All-Pro (1999); 2× Pro Bowl (1998, 1999); PFWA All-Rookie Team (1997); Third-team All-American (1996); Morris Trophy (1996); 2× First-team All-Pac-10 (1995, 1996)

Career NFL statistics
- Tackles: 235
- Sacks: 28.5
- Interceptions: 3
- Stats at Pro Football Reference

Darrell Anthony Russell Jr. (May 27, 1976 – December 15, 2005) was an American professional football player who was a defensive tackle for the Oakland Raiders and Washington Redskins of the National Football League (NFL). He died in a car crash near Los Angeles after being indefinitely banned from the NFL for repeated violations of the league's substance abuse policy.

== Early life ==
Darrell Anthony Russell Jr. was born in Pensacola, Florida. His mother, Eleanor Russell, divorced in 1986 from Darrell Anthony Russell Sr. when their only child was four years old, and moved from Florida to Southern California. Russell grew up in a rough part of San Diego just a few blocks from Lincoln Kennedy. Russell graduated from St. Augustine High School.

== College career ==
Russell attended the University of Southern California and, after a dominant 1996 season that featured 19 tackles for loss, was taken second overall in the 1997 NFL draft by Al Davis and the Raiders.

== Professional career ==
Pre-draft measurables
Height	Weight	Arm length	Hand span	40-yard dash	20-yard shuttle	Three-cone drill	Vertical jump	Broad jump	Bench press
6 ft 4 5/8 in (1.95 m)	321 lb (146 kg)	35 1/8 in (0.89 m)	10 1/2 in (0.27 m)	4.80 s	4.26 s	7.65 s	31.5 in (0.80 m)	8 ft 0 in (2.44 m)	25 reps

At 6-foot-5-inch (196 cm), 320-pounds Russell ran the 40-yard dash in 4.8 seconds. Russell was selected with the second overall pick in the first round of the 1997 NFL draft. Russell's seven-year, $22 million contract in 1997 was at the time the richest rookie contract ever signed in the NFL.

He went on to have 28.5 career sacks. After making the Pro Bowl in 1998 and 1999, averaging ten sacks per year, he was poised to have a dominant NFL career. However, the following season he failed a drug test, which his lawyer attributed to "second-hand smoke," and was later suspended for four games in 2001 for a second violation, this time for failing to be tested. Shortly after that, he tested positive for a banned substance and was given a one-year suspension, which effectively wiped out his 2002 season. Russell missed 1½ years while serving two league suspensions before he played in eight games in 2003 for the Washington Redskins. However, the positive drug tests kept coming, and Russell was suspended indefinitely by the league. Russell's positive drug test in 2004 was his seventh infraction of the league's drug policy. His last NFL experience was in the Tampa Bay Buccaneers training camp in 2004.

== NFL statistics ==
Year	Team	GP	Tackles				Fumbles		Interceptions					
Year	Team	GP	Comb	Solo	Ast	Sack	FF	FR	Int	Yds	Avg	Lng	TD	PD
1997	OAK	16	43	34	9	3.5	1	0	0	0	0.0	0	0	6
1998	OAK	16	63	55	8	10.0	3	1	0	0	0.0	0	0	2
1999	OAK	16	43	32	11	9.5	0	1	0	0	0.0	0	0	4
2000	OAK	16	33	24	9	3.0	1	1	0	0	0.0	0	0	7
2001	OAK	11	41	31	10	2.5	0	0	1	0	0.0	0	0	4
2002	OAK	0	Suspended											
2003	WSH	8	6	3	3	0.0	1	0	0	0	0.0	0	0	0
Career		83	229	179	50	28.5	6	3	1	0	0.0	0	0	23

== Acting career ==
In 2002, he played as himself in an episode of The Jersey called "Coleman's Big Date" where at an Oakland Raiders football game, his date jumps into his body as Coleman Galloway (played by Jermaine Williams) jumps into a cheerleaders' body.

== Personal ==
He was accused in 2002 of videotaping the rape of a woman—who had been drugged with GHB—by two friends, but prosecutors dropped the charges.

=== Death ===
On December 15, 2005, Russell was a passenger in a 2004 Pontiac Grand Prix driven by close friend and former USC teammate Michael Bastianelli when it veered out of control, hitting several objects including a tree and a fire hydrant before hitting a parked bus. Both men were found unconscious and taken to area hospitals, where they were pronounced dead.
