= Lance Johnstone =

American football player (born 1973)

No. 51
- Position: Defensive end

Personal information
- Born: June 11, 1973 (age 53); Philadelphia, Pennsylvania, U.S.
- Listed height: 6 ft 5 in (1.96 m)
- Listed weight: 250 lb (113 kg)

Career information
- High school: Germantown (Philadelphia, Pennsylvania)
- College: Temple
- NFL draft: 1996: 2nd round, 57th overall pick

Career history
- Oakland Raiders (1996–2000); Minnesota Vikings (2001–2005); Oakland Raiders (2006)

Career NFL statistics
- Tackles: 386
- Sacks: 72
- Interceptions: 2
- Stats at Pro Football Reference

Lance Johnstone (born June 11, 1973) is an American former professional football player who was a defensive end in the National Football League (NFL). He was a four-year letterman playing college football for the Temple Owls, playing his final three seasons at linebacker and serving as team captain in 1994 and 1995. He left Temple with the school record in solo tackles with 288 and set a single game school record with 15 solo tackles against Pittsburgh as a junior. He was selected in the 1996 NFL draft by the Oakland Raiders and also played for the Minnesota Vikings from 2001 to 2005, where he accumulated 42 sacks in just five seasons. He was signed again by Oakland in April 2006. In his 11 NFL seasons, he missed only nine games.

== NFL career statistics ==
Legend
	Led the league
**Bold**	Career high

Year	Team	Games		Tackles				Interceptions				Fumbles			
Year	Team	GP	GS	Comb	Solo	Ast	Sck	Int	Yds	TD	Lng	FF	FR	Yds	TD
1996	OAK	16	10	32	26	6	1.0	0	0	0	0	0	**1**	1	**1**
1997	OAK	14	6	31	20	**11**	3.5	0	0	0	0	2	**1**	2	0
1998	OAK	16	15	**54**	**48**	6	**11.0**	0	0	0	0	2	**1**	**40**	**1**
1999	OAK	16	16	52	46	6	10.0	**1**	0	0	0	**5**	**1**	13	**1**
2000	OAK	14	9	32	22	10	3.5	0	0	0	0	2	0	0	0
2001	MIN	16	5	38	29	9	5.5	0	0	0	0	1	0	0	0
2002	MIN	16	16	51	41	10	7.0	0	0	0	0	0	**1**	0	0
2003	MIN	16	0	29	21	8	10.0	**1**	**33**	**1**	**33**	2	**1**	0	0
2004	MIN	16	1	31	25	6	**11.0**	0	0	0	0	**5**	0	0	0
2005	MIN	15	1	20	15	5	7.5	0	0	0	0	0	0	0	0
2006	OAK	11	1	16	12	4	2.0	0	0	0	0	0	0	0	0
		166	80	386	305	81	72.0	2	33	1	33	19	6	56	3
