= Charles Woodson =

American football player (born 1976)

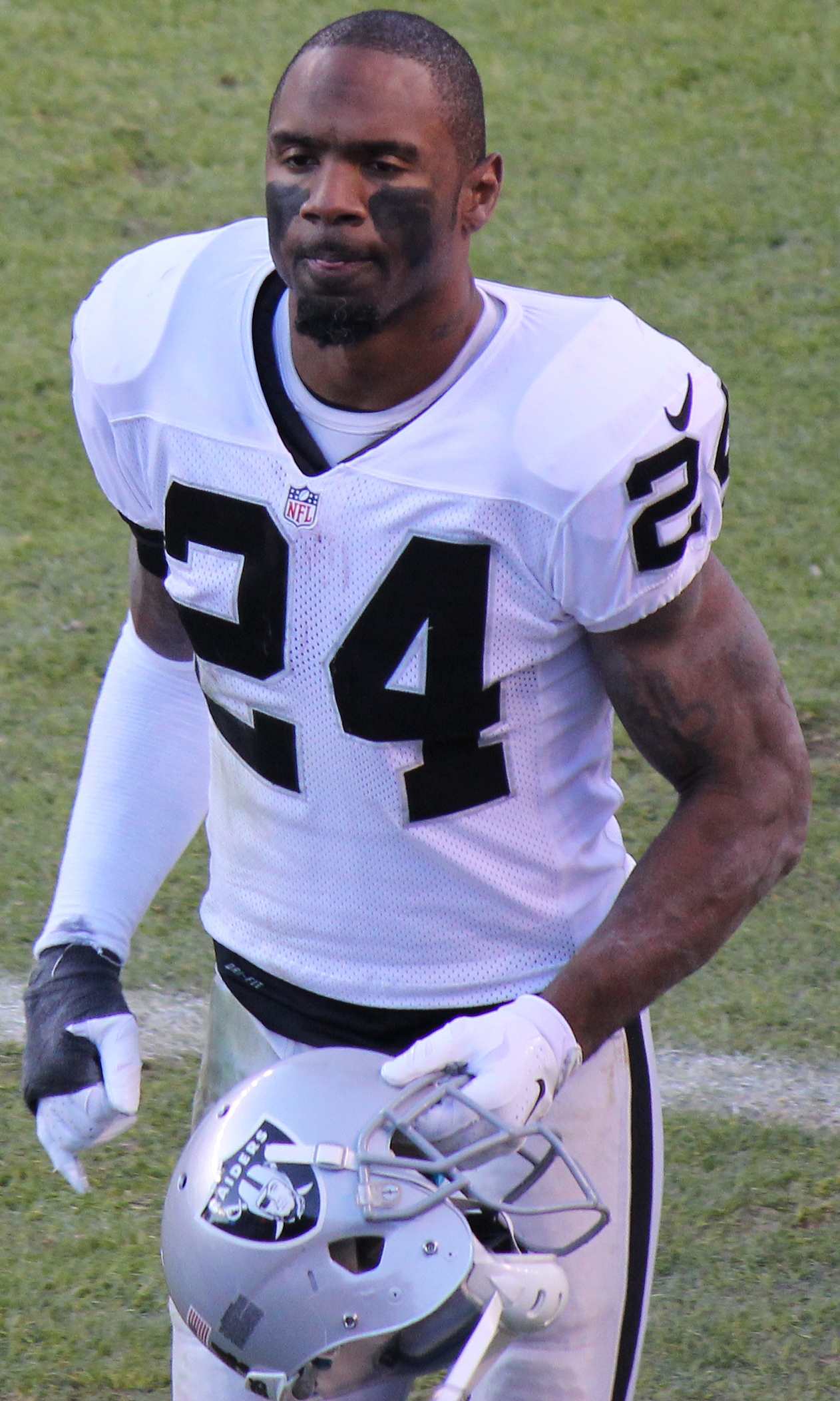
- Woodson with the Oakland Raiders in 2014

No. 24, 21
- Positions: Cornerback, safety

Personal information
- Born: October 7, 1976 (age 50); Fremont, Ohio, U.S.
- Listed height: 6 ft 1 in (1.85 m)
- Listed weight: 210 lb (95 kg)

Career information
- High school: Ross (Fremont)
- College: Michigan (1995–1997)
- NFL draft: 1998: 1st round, 4th overall pick

Career history
- Oakland Raiders (1998–2005); Green Bay Packers (2006–2012); Oakland Raiders (2013–2015)

Awards and highlights
- Super Bowl champion (XLV); NFL Defensive Player of the Year (2009); NFL Defensive Rookie of the Year (1998); 4× First-team All-Pro (1999, 2001, 2009, 2011); 4× Second-team All-Pro (2000, 2008, 2010, 2015); 9× Pro Bowl (1998–2001, 2008–2011, 2015); 2× NFL interceptions leader (2009, 2011); NFL 2000s All-Decade Team; Green Bay Packers Hall of Fame; NCAA national champion (1997); Heisman Trophy (1997); Unanimous All-American (1997); First-team All-American (1996); Big Ten Male Athlete of the Year (1998); 3× First-team All-Big Ten (1995, 1996, 1997); First-team AP All-Time All-American (2025); NFL records: Consecutive seasons with an interception for a touchdown: 6 (Note: 2006–2011); Career defensive touchdowns: 13 (Note: Tied with Rod Woodson and Darren Sharper)

Career NFL statistics
- Tackles: 1,120
- Interceptions: 65
- Interception yards: 966
- Pass deflections: 155
- Forced fumbles: 33
- Fumble recoveries: 18
- Sacks: 20.0
- Defensive touchdowns: 13
- Stats at Pro Football Reference
- Pro Football Hall of Fame
- College Football Hall of Fame

Charles C. Woodson (born October 7, 1976) is an American former professional football defensive back who played in the National Football League (NFL) for 18 seasons with the Oakland Raiders and Green Bay Packers. He spent his first 14 seasons as a cornerback and his final four as a safety. Woodson played college football for the Michigan Wolverines, winning the Heisman Trophy in 1997 and becoming the first defensive player to receive the award.

Selected fourth overall by the Raiders in the 1998 NFL draft, Woodson received Pro Bowl selections during his first four seasons and two first-team All-Pro honors. Woodson left the Raiders after eight seasons to join the Packers, where he played his next seven seasons. During his Packers tenure, Woodson was named Defensive Player of the Year in 2009 and won Super Bowl XLV, while extending his Pro Bowl selections to eight and his first-team All-Pro honors to four. He returned to the Raiders for his last three seasons, earning his ninth Pro Bowl selection in his final season.

One of the NFL's most decorated players, Woodson is tied with Rod Woodson (no relation) and Darren Sharper for the most defensive touchdowns, second in interceptions returned for touchdowns, and tied with Ken Riley for the fifth-most interceptions. He is also one of the few players to appear in a Pro Bowl during three different decades. Woodson was inducted to the College Football Hall of Fame in 2018 and the Pro Football Hall of Fame in 2021.

== Early life ==
Woodson was born in Fremont, Ohio. As a senior at Ross High School, Woodson was named Ohio's "Mr. Football". He finished his high school football career with the school's records for rushing yards (3,861) and scoring (466 points). In his senior season, he was a USA Today All-America selection and Parade High School All-American and recorded 2,028 yards and 230 points. All colleges recruited Woodson as a running back, while Michigan recruited him as a cornerback. In addition to playing football, Woodson also played basketball (point guard) and competed in track and field (relay sprinter and long jumper).

In 2024, Woodson was inducted into the National High School Football Hall of Fame.

== College career ==
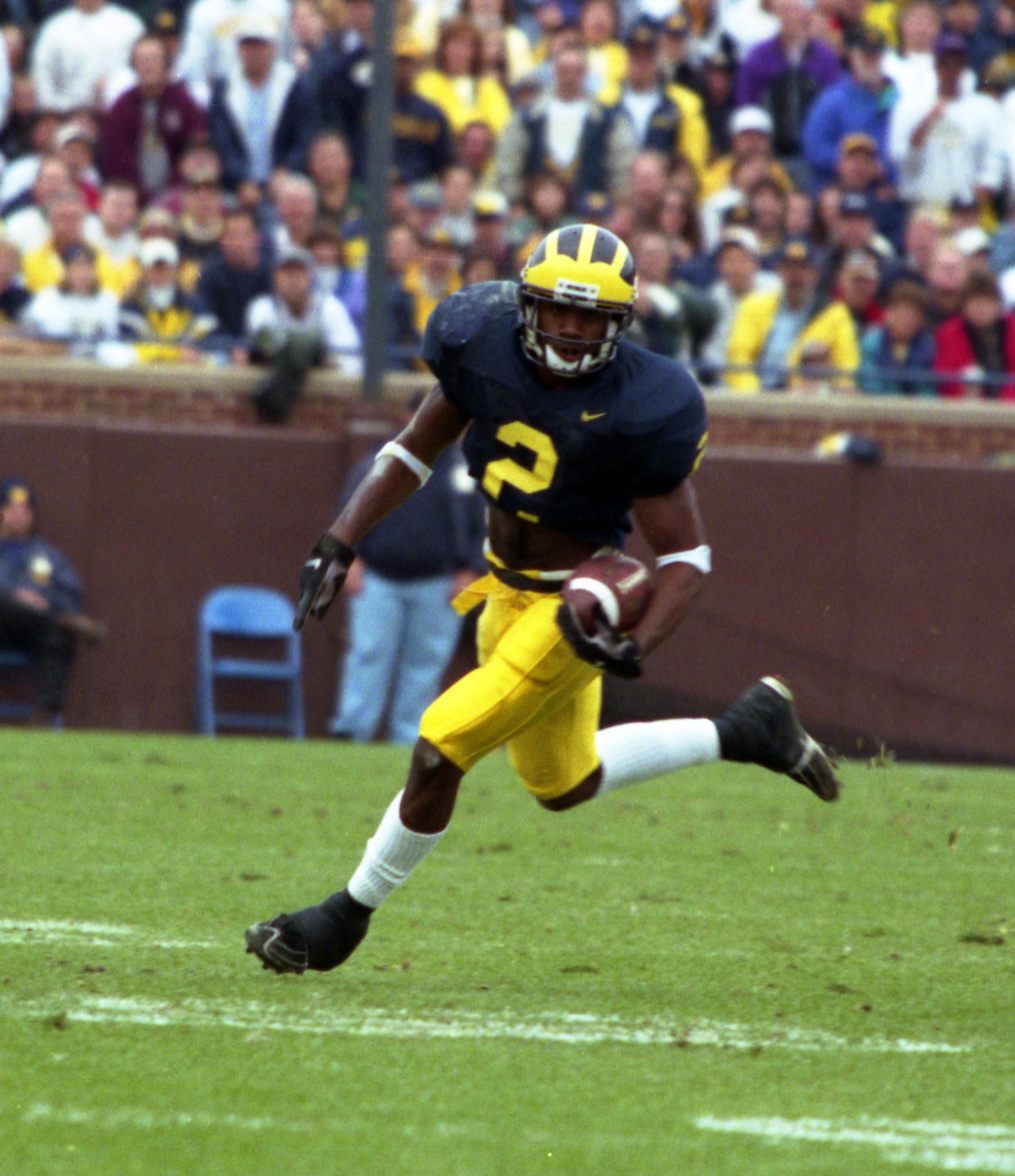
Woodson playing for Michigan in 1997

Woodson attended the University of Michigan, where he played for coach Lloyd Carr's Wolverines teams from 1995 to 1997. He became the starter after the second game of his freshman season and played in 34 straight games. In addition to playing cornerback, he returned punts and occasionally played as a wide receiver.

=== Freshman season ===
In 1995, Woodson was selected as the Big Ten Freshman of the Year, as well as being named to the All-Big Ten First-team by conference coaches, and the second-team by the media. He led the team with five interceptions and eight takeaways.

=== Sophomore season ===
In 1996, Woodson set a Wolverine record for pass breakups in a season, with 15. For his efforts, he was named the Chevrolet Defensive Player of the Year and an AP First-team All-American. He was also a finalist for the Jim Thorpe Award and named to the All-Big Ten First-team by both the conference coaches and the media.

=== Junior season ===
In 1997, Woodson became the third Michigan player in program history to win the Heisman Trophy, joining Tom Harmon (1940) and Desmond Howard (1991). Woodson received 282 more voting points than runner-up Peyton Manning of Tennessee. He was the first full-time defensive player to win the prestigious award, with the only other modern defensive winner being two-way player Travis Hunter in 2024. Woodson led the Michigan Wolverines to an undefeated season and a share of the national championship in the same year. He also won the Bronko Nagurski Trophy, as the best defensive college player, as well as winning the Chevrolet Defensive Player of the Year award for a second consecutive season. Woodson was named to the All-Big Ten first-team for a third consecutive season, and was recognized as a unanimous first-team All-American. He also won the Big Ten Defensive Player of the Year, Big Ten Most Valuable Player and the Big Ten Male Athlete of the Year, amongst others.

Woodson finished his three-year collegiate career with 18 interceptions, currently second all-time in University of Michigan football history. Throughout college, Woodson was known for big plays, in big moments of games. As a freshman, he had two interceptions in a victory against the No. 2 ranked Ohio State Buckeyes. During his Heisman-winning junior year, he made an acrobatic one-handed sideline interception against the Michigan State Spartans. Woodson had two interceptions in the game. In a game against Ohio State, he returned a punt for a touchdown, made an interception in the endzone, and had a 37-yard reception on Michigan's only offensive touchdown scoring drive of the game. Woodson later stated that he tried to do Desmond Howard's famous "pose" after scoring the touchdown, but failed after his teammates mobbed him in the end zone. The win over the Buckeyes lifted Michigan to the Rose Bowl. Michigan played the Washington State Cougars in the Rose Bowl, where Woodson recorded another endzone interception, helping Michigan defeat the Cougars and win a share of the 1997 national championship.

== Professional career ==
Pre-draft measurables
Height	Weight	Arm length	40-yard dash	Vertical jump
6 ft 0 7/8 in (1.85 m)	200 lb (91 kg)	32 1/4 in (0.82 m)	4.43 s	37.0 in (0.94 m)
All values from NFL Combine/pre-draft

=== Oakland Raiders ===
==== Early NFL career ====
Woodson declared his eligibility for the NFL draft following his junior season at Michigan and was selected as the fourth overall pick in the 1998 draft by the Oakland Raiders.

After the 1998 season, Woodson was named the NFL Defensive Rookie of the Year by the Associated Press. He started all sixteen games, becoming the first rookie Raider since 1971 to do so. Woodson had 64 tackles that season. He was also third in the league in interceptions (with five), returned one interception for a touchdown against the Arizona Cardinals, and produced one forced fumble. Woodson was named to his first Pro Bowl.

In 1999, Woodson had his first career reception, a 19-yard catch, against the San Diego Chargers on November 14. On November 28, against the Kansas City Chiefs, he had a 15-yard interception return for a touchdown in the 37–34 loss. He finished the season with 61 total tackles and a fumble recovery to go along with the pick-six. Woodson was selected to his second Pro Bowl and was named All-Pro by the Associated Press.

In the 2000 season, Woodson started all sixteen games of the season but suffered a turf toe injury, which prevented him from practicing. He finished the year with a career-high 79 tackles, intercepted four passes, forced three fumbles, and recovered one fumble. He earned a third consecutive Pro Bowl nomination. He was named to the All-Pro team by Sports Illustrated, and second-team honors from the Associated Press.

In 2001, his fourth year in the NFL, Woodson started sixteen games. This was the fourth consecutive year Woodson played in every game of the season. Woodson finished with two sacks, one interception, one forced fumble, and one blocked field goal. Woodson returned punts for the first time in the NFL, returning four punts for 47 yards. On January 19, 2002, he participated in the Tuck Rule play against the New England Patriots in the postseason. He was named to his fourth consecutive Pro Bowl. He made All-Pro teams of The Sporting News and College and Pro Football Newsweekly and the All-AFC squad of Football News.

==== First Super Bowl appearance ====
In 2002, Woodson suffered his first major injury since his freshman year at Michigan, suffering from a shoulder injury which caused him to be inactive for eight games. The shoulder injury came in the first half of the second game of the season. Despite the injury Woodson played the remainder of the game and was able to force a fumble. After recovering from his shoulder injury, Woodson missed the last three games of the regular season, suffering from a cracked fibula bone in his right leg. Woodson started every Raider game in the 2003 NFL Playoffs, finishing with a start in Super Bowl XXXVII. In the Super Bowl, Woodson showed signs of his injury, but still recorded an interception in a losing effort against the Tampa Bay Buccaneers.

After losing the Super Bowl in the year prior, the Raiders finished the 2003 season with a dismal 4–12 record. Woodson became unhappy with new head coach Bill Callahan, and criticized him during the season. Woodson remained healthy for the entire season, starting in his first fifteen games. His contract was set to expire after the season. Woodson reached an agreement with Oakland and was labeled as a franchise player. The franchise tag set Woodson's contract with a minimum of the average salary for the top five cornerbacks in the NFL. Although being labeled as a franchise player, Woodson's contract was only for one year.

In the 2004 season, Woodson played the first 13 games of the season before suffering a leg injury which put him inactive in the last three weeks. He finished the season with 73 total tackles, 2.5 sacks, one interception, nine passes defensed, two forced fumbles, and one fumble recovery. After the season, Woodson again agreed to a one-year franchise tag deal.

In 2005, he started the first six games but broke his leg in the sixth week, which sidelined him for the rest of the year. He finished the season with 30 total tackles, one interception, four passes defensed, and one forced fumble.

=== Green Bay Packers ===
==== Career resurgence ====
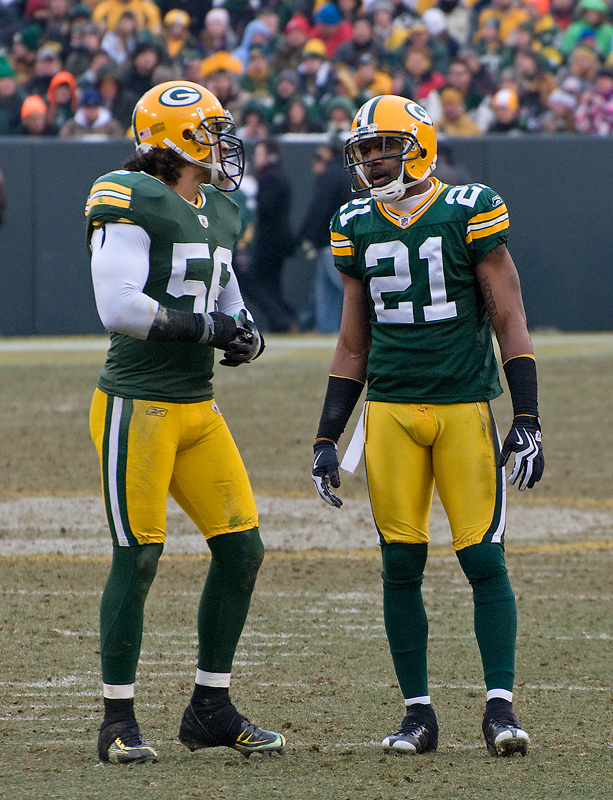
Woodson (21) and Nick Barnett

On April 26, 2006, Woodson and the Green Bay Packers reached a 7-year contract agreement that could be worth as much as $52.7 million with bonuses and incentives. He earned $10.5 million in the first year of the deal and $18 million over the first three years. He would have received a $3 million bonus if he was selected to the Pro Bowl in two of the first three years of the contract. Woodson has stated that at the time of the contract he "did not want to come to Green Bay" due to a perception that the city is less than cosmopolitan, but was forced to do so because the Packers were the only team to offer him a contract. The cornerback has since lauded the Packers organization, Mike McCarthy, and the people of Wisconsin for having faith in him, and has declared that "it was truly a blessing coming to Green Bay."

Free of any major injuries during the 2006 season, Woodson (tied with Walt Harris formerly of the San Francisco 49ers) led the National Football Conference with eight interceptions. At the time, that was the most interceptions Woodson had recorded in a single season. On October 22, he had a 23-yard interception return for a touchdown against the Miami Dolphins. Overall, he was tied for third in that statistic in the entire NFL. He was used as his team's starting punt returner for the first time in his NFL career, returning 41 punts for 363 yards.

On October 14, 2007, Woodson picked up a Santana Moss fumble and returned it 57 yards for a touchdown in a 17–14 victory over the Washington Redskins. He recorded an interception in the game, his first of the season. Woodson was named the NFC's Defensive Player of the Week for his performance versus the Redskins, which was the first time he had received that award. On November 4, Woodson had a 46-yard interception return for a touchdown with 59 seconds remaining in the fourth quarter to seal a win over the Kansas City Chiefs. He finished the season with 63 total tackles, four interceptions, nine passes defensed, and two fumble recoveries.

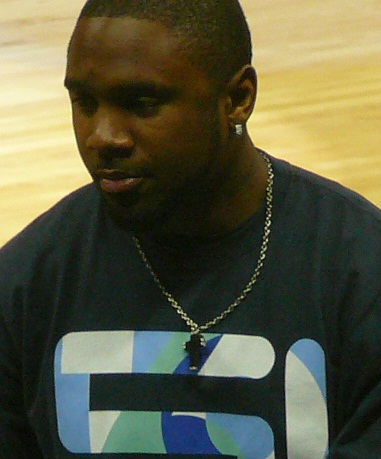
Woodson at an Atlanta Hawks game in May 2008

On September 15, 2008, Woodson recorded two interceptions in a 48–25 victory over the Detroit Lions. He returned the second interception 41 yards for a touchdown. Woodson was named NFL Defensive Player of the Month for September in 2008. On December 16, 2008, Woodson was named to his fifth Pro Bowl, his first with the Packers. Overall, he finished the season with 62 total tackles, seven interceptions, two pick-sixes, 17 passes defensed, one forced fumble, and one fumble recovery.

==== 2009 season: Defensive Player of the Year ====
Woodson was named the NFC Defensive Player of the Month for September. On November 15, 2009, Woodson recorded nine tackles (two for loss), a sack, two forced fumbles and an interception in a 17–7 victory over the Dallas Cowboys. Woodson is the first player in NFL history to have a sack, two forced fumbles, and an interception in a game. He was named NFC Defensive Player of the Week for his performance.

On November 26, 2009, Woodson had an impressive Thanksgiving game at Ford Field against the Detroit Lions. He recorded seven tackles, one sack, one forced fumble and recovery (same play), four passes defended and two interceptions, one of which he returned for a touchdown. He covered star receiver Calvin Johnson and limited him to two catches for 10 yards. Although one of these was a touchdown, Green Bay won the game 34–12. Woodson was named NFC Defensive Player of the Week for this performance and was named NFC Defensive Player of the Month for the month of November.

In January 2010, Woodson was named the NFC Defensive Player of the Month for December 2009. He is the only defensive player to ever receive this award three times in the same season, and joins Barry Sanders and Mike Vanderjagt as the only NFL players to receive a Player of the Month award three times in a single season. For his effort during the 2009 season Woodson was selected as the AP Defensive Player of the Year and was named The Sporting News Defensive Player of the Year. Overall, he finished the season with 74 total tackles, nine interceptions, three pick-sixes, 18 passes defensed, four forced fumbles, one fumble recovery, and two sacks.

Woodson had more interceptions in his first four years with the Packers (28) than he did in his previous eight with the Raiders (17). He also has more touchdowns (8 vs 2) and sacks (6 vs 5.5) with the Packers than he did during his time in Oakland. He holds the Packers' franchise record for most defensive touchdowns (eight total, seven interception returns and one fumble return). Woodson won the 2009 NFL Defensive Player of the Year Award. He earned his sixth Pro Bowl and second First Team All-Pro nomination. He was named to the Pro Football Hall of Fame All-Decade Team for the 2000s.

==== 2010 season: Super Bowl champion ====
On September 9, 2010, despite having three years left on his current contract, Woodson was offered and signed a two-year extension with the Packers, adding five years and $55 million to his existing pact.

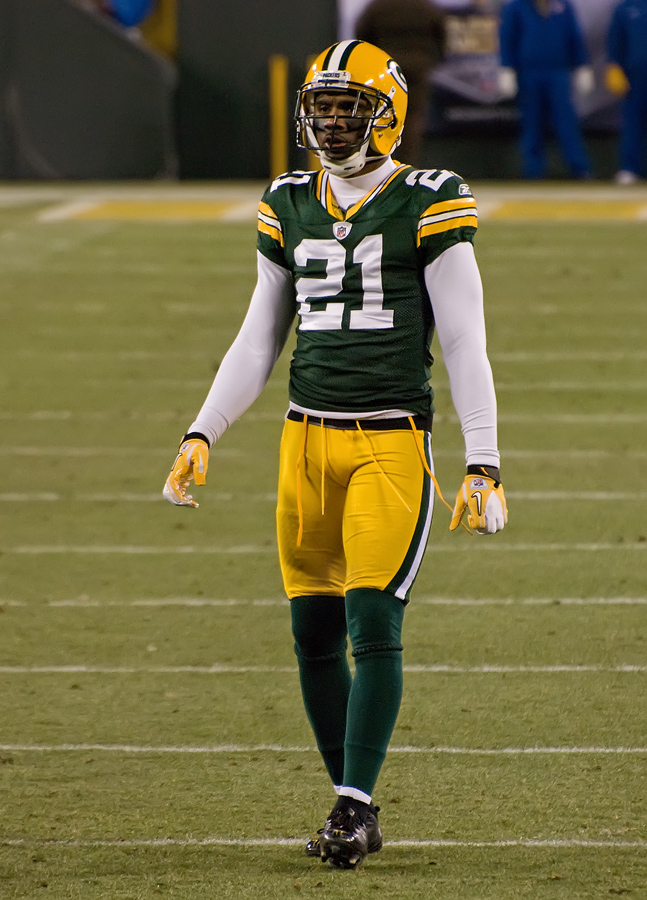
Woodson in 2011

During the 2010 season, Woodson recorded two interceptions and five forced fumbles for the Packers. He was named to the 2011 Pro Bowl as a starting cornerback. It was his seventh career selection to the Pro Bowl. Woodson was named co-captain along with teammate A. J. Hawk for the Packers defensive unit through the post-season. He provided a huge performance, limiting Pro Bowler DeSean Jackson to just two catches (for 47 yards), and recorded five tackles in the Packers' win over the Philadelphia Eagles in the Wild Card Round on January 9, 2011. Woodson also played an important role in Dom Capers' defense in playoff victories against the Atlanta Falcons in the Divisional Round and the Chicago Bears in the NFC Championship and started against the Pittsburgh Steelers in Super Bowl XLV. With 1:54 before halftime of the Super Bowl, Woodson broke his collar bone while diving to successfully defend a pass intended for Mike Wallace. An emotional Woodson gave a speech to his teammates during halftime. Watching from the sidelines in the second half, Woodson cheered his team on to a 31–25 victory, his only championship title. Despite his Super Bowl injury, Woodson finished the game with three total tackles, including two solo tackles.

Barack Obama said if the Bears won the NFC Championship, that he would see them play in Super Bowl XLV, but he would not see Green Bay. Woodson sent Obama a jersey saying, "See you at the White House!" and had a pep talk in the locker room. He told the team if the President did not want to see the Packers play in the Super Bowl then they would go to the White House. The Packers won the Super Bowl, but could not visit the White House until August because of the terms in the NFL Lockout. When they visited the White House, Obama made reference to Woodson's pep rally and autographed jersey. Woodson responded by handing Barack Obama a certificate stating that Obama is a minority owner of the Packers. Obama also said, "I have learned something that many quarterbacks have learned. Don't mess with Charles Woodson."

Engraved inside the Super Bowl 45 Ring is the numeral "1" along with the words "Mind, Goal, Purpose and Heart": the number and terms veteran cornerback Charles Woodson used during his memorable postgame locker room speech following the NFC Championship in Chicago. Woodson was ranked 16th by his fellow players on the NFL Top 100 Players of 2011.

==== Final years in Green Bay ====
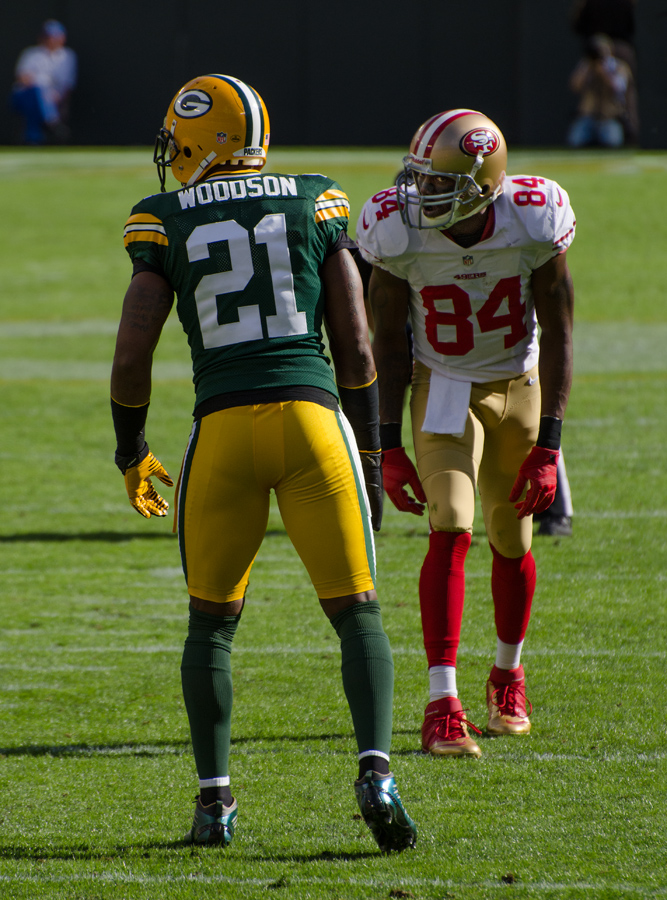
Woodson covering Randy Moss in 2012

When Woodson intercepted Cam Newton against the Carolina Panthers in Week 2 of the 2011 season, it marked the fourth time he intercepted a fellow Heisman Trophy winner. The other three quarterbacks he intercepted a pass from were Vinny Testaverde, Carson Palmer, and Matt Leinart. Woodson recorded his 50th career interception in the first quarter of Green Bay's Week 4 game against the Denver Broncos, picking off Kyle Orton. This, his eleventh career interception return for a touchdown, placed him second all-time behind Rod Woodson. He finished the season with 74 total tackles, seven interceptions, one pick-six, 17 passes defensed, one forced fumble, one fumble recovery, and two sacks. He earned his eighth Pro Bowl and third First Team All-Pro nomination.

Woodson started the 2012 season in a different role for the Packers, hoping to fill the void left by free safety Nick Collins, who had been out of football for almost a year with a neck injury. He described it simply as "just playing football". Defensive Coordinator Dom Capers' plan was to play Woodson at the safety position, while also playing some time as the nickelback. This saw Woodson in a Polamalu-like position of the Pittsburgh Steelers, lining up on either side ready to rush or drop back in coverage. Against the San Francisco 49ers in Week 1, the 35 year old Woodson recorded five tackles, 1.5 sacks, and a forced fumble in a losing effort. Against the Chicago Bears in Week 2, he recorded his 55th interception of his career, and first as a strong safety. The pass was intended for Earl Bennett. Woodson suffered a broken collarbone during the Packers' victory over the St. Louis Rams on Sunday, October 21, and was out for the next nine games. Overall, he finished the season with 38 total tackles, one interception, five passes defensed, one forced fumble, and 1.5 sacks.

Woodson sat out several weeks with the broken collarbone, but made it back for the first playoff game, the Wild Card Round against the Minnesota Vikings. He helped the Packers defeat the Vikings, but they would fall to the 49ers the following week in the Divisional Round. He was ranked 85th by his fellow players on the NFL Top 100 Players of 2014.

On February 15, 2013, the Packers released Woodson.

=== Oakland Raiders (second stint) ===
==== Return to Oakland and retirement ====
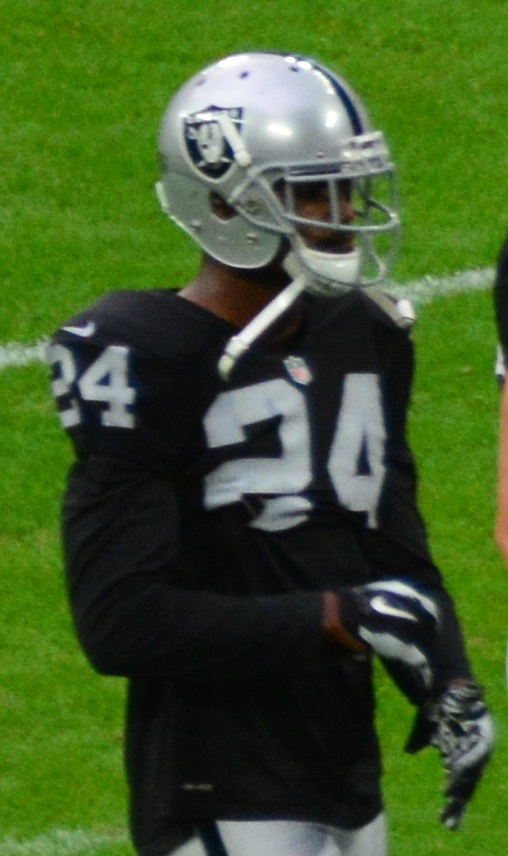
Woodson with the Oakland Raiders in 2014

On May 21, 2013, Woodson signed a one-year deal with the Oakland Raiders. He played in the preseason and started in week 1 against the Indianapolis Colts. On October 6, in a Week 5 game against the San Diego Chargers, Woodson tied the NFL record (with Darren Sharper and former teammate Rod Woodson) for most defensive touchdowns by scoring on a fumble recovery for his 13th defensive touchdown. He earned AFC Defensive Player of the Week honors for his game against the Chargers. By the end of the season, he had played in 1,067 of 1,074 possible defensive snaps for the team amassing 97 tackles (75 solo), two sacks, three forced fumbles, two fumble recoveries, three pass defenses, one interception, and the aforementioned touchdown.

In Week 14 of the 2014 season, Woodson earned AFC Defensive Player of the Week honors for his game against the Kansas City Chiefs. Woodson finished the 2014 season with 111 total tackles, four interceptions, eight passes defensed, one fumble recovery, and one sack. He was ranked 64th by his fellow players on the NFL Top 100 Players of 2015.

On January 26, 2015, the Raiders announced via Twitter that they agreed to a contract for Woodson to return for the 2015 season. In the 2015 season, Woodson was moved to strong safety. After this switch, Woodson became one of the few players in NFL history to play at all three spots in the secondary. Prior to Week 5 against the Denver Broncos, Woodson said that he always wanted to intercept a pass from Peyton Manning, as he never accomplished that feat during his career. Woodson lived up to his word and picked off Manning two times. However, the Broncos won 16–10. Woodson was named AFC Defensive Player of the Month for October. On December 21, Woodson announced that he would retire at the end of the season. On January 3, 2016, he played in his final NFL game, a 23–17 loss to the Kansas City Chiefs. He finished his final season with 74 total tackles, five interceptions, nine passes defensed, one forced fumble, and four fumble recoveries. He was named to the Pro Bowl in his final season.

On February 12, 2016, it was announced that Woodson would be joining ESPN's Sunday NFL Countdown, replacing Keyshawn Johnson for the upcoming season. He served in that capacity until 2018 when he moved to Fox Sports to cover college football as an analyst.

== NFL career statistics ==
Legend
	AP NFL Defensive Player of the Year
	Won the Super Bowl
	Led the league
**Bold**	Career high

=== Regular season ===
Year	Team	Games		Tackles				Interceptions				Fumbles			
Year	Team	GP	GS	Cmb	Solo	Ast	Sck	Int	Yds	TD	PD	FF	FR	Yds	TD
1998	OAK	16	16	64	61	3	0.0	5	118	1	0	2	0	0	0
1999	OAK	16	16	61	52	9	0.0	1	15	1	0	0	1	24	0
2000	OAK	16	16	79	66	13	0.0	4	36	0	0	3	1	0	0
2001	OAK	16	15	52	39	13	2.0	1	64	0	11	1	0	0	0
2002	OAK	8	7	33	31	2	0.0	1	3	0	4	4	1	0	0
2003	OAK	15	15	69	56	13	1.0	3	67	0	8	1	1	3	0
2004	OAK	13	12	73	58	15	2.5	1	25	0	9	2	1	0	0
2005	OAK	6	6	30	26	4	0.0	1	0	0	4	1	0	0	0
2006	GB	16	16	59	48	11	1.0	8	61	1	**20**	3	1	0	0
2007	GB	14	14	63	52	11	0.0	4	48	1	9	0	2	**57**	**1**
2008	GB	16	16	62	50	12	**3.0**	7	169	2	17	1	1	−2	0
2009	GB	16	16	74	66	8	2.0	**9**	**179**	**3**	18	4	1	0	0
2010	GB	16	16	92	76	16	2.0	2	48	1	13	**5**	0	0	0
2011	GB	15	15	74	62	12	2.0	7	63	1	17	1	1	−1	0
2012	GB	7	7	38	25	13	1.5	1	0	0	5	1	0	0	0
2013	OAK	16	16	97	75	22	2.0	1	13	0	3	3	2	25	**1**
2014	OAK	16	16	**111**	**81**	**30**	1.0	4	35	0	8	0	1	0	0
2015	OAK	16	16	74	59	15	0.0	5	22	0	9	1	**4**	36	0
Career		254	251	1,205	983	222	20.0	65	996	11	155	33	18	142	2

=== Postseason ===
Year	Team	Games		Tackles				Interceptions			Fumbles
Year	Team	GP	GS	Cmb	Solo	Ast	Sck	Int	Yds	PD	FR
2000	OAK	2	2	5	4	1	0.0	0	0	2	**1**
2001	OAK	2	2	12	8	**4**	0.0	0	0	3	0
2002	OAK	3	3	**22**	**18**	**4**	0.0	**1**	**12**	**3**	0
2007	GB	2	1	7	6	1	0.0	0	0	2	0
2009	GB	1	1	0	0	0	0.0	0	0	2	0
2010	GB	4	4	18	15	3	**1.0**	0	0	0	0
2011	GB	1	1	0	0	0	0.0	0	0	1	0
2012	GB	2	2	12	9	3	0.0	0	0	2	0
Career		17	16	76	60	16	1.0	1	12	15	1

== Career highlights ==
=== Awards and honors ===
NFL

- Super Bowl champion (XLV)
- NFL Defensive Player of the Year (2009)
- NFL Defensive Rookie of the Year (1998)
- 4× First-team All-Pro (1999, 2001, 2009, 2011)
- 4× Second-team All-Pro (2000, 2008, 2010, 2015)
- 9× Pro Bowl (1998–2001, 2008–2011, 2015)
- 2× NFL interceptions leader (2009, 2011)
- NFL 2000s All-Decade Team
- PFWA All-Rookie Team (1998)
- 4× NFL Top 100 — 16th (2011), 36th (2012), 85th (2013), 64th (2015)
- Art Rooney Award (2015)
- Green Bay Packers Hall of Fame

College

- NCAA national champion (1997)
- Heisman Trophy (1997)
- Walter Camp Award (1997)
- Bronko Nagurski Trophy (1997)
- Chuck Bednarik Award (1997)
- Jim Thorpe Award (1997)
- Jack Tatum Trophy (1997)
- SN Player of the Year (1997)
- Chic Harley Award (1997)
- Unanimous All-American (1997)
- First-team All-American (1996)
- Big Ten Male Athlete of the Year (1998)
- Big Ten Most Valuable Player (1997)
- Big Ten Defensive Player of the Year (1997)
- Big Ten Co-Freshman of the Year (1995)
- 3× First-team All-Big Ten (1995, 1996, 1997)
- First-team AP All-Time All-American (2025)

=== Records ===
NFL

- Consecutive seasons with an interception returned for a touchdown: 6 (2006–2011)
- Career defensive touchdowns: 13 (Tied with Rod Woodson and Darren Sharper)

Oakland Raiders career franchise records

- Franchise career leader in forced fumbles: 18
- Franchise career leader in defended passes/pass deflections: 84

Green Bay Packers career franchise records

- Interceptions returned for a touchdown: 9
- Defensive touchdowns: 10

== Personal life ==
Woodson is an oenophile who developed his interest in wine while playing football for the first time in Oakland, near the Napa Valley. He partnered with former Robert Mondavi winemaker Rick Ruiz to develop a signature wine label, "Twentyfour by Charles Woodson". The company is based in Napa, California, and is a small boutique winery, producing fewer than one thousand cases per year of its two varieties, Cabernet Sauvignon and Cabernet Franc. Although the wine bears his name and signature, Woodson was warned by the NFL not to be seen endorsing the wine himself because of the league's alcohol policy. Woodson was arrested twice: in 2000 for DUI, and in 2004 for public intoxication after refusing to get out of a woman's car.

Woodson is married to April (née Dixon) Woodson and they have two sons together, Charles Jr. and Chase. Charles Jr. followed his father and committed to play college football for the Michigan Wolverines.

On November 26, 2009, Woodson contributed $2 million to the University of Michigan C.S. Mott Children's Hospital for pediatric research. Woodson has his own charitable foundation to support the fight against breast cancer called the Charles Woodson Foundation. In October 2012, Woodson donated $100,000 to the Hurricane Sandy relief effort. During the Green Bay Packers' 2010 Super Bowl-winning season, Woodson publicly called out US President Barack Obama on his support for longtime Packers' rivals, the Chicago Bears. In a postgame locker room speech to his teammates, Woodson stated, "The President don't want to come watch us win the Super Bowl? Guess what? We'll go see him" (implying that Green Bay would win the Super Bowl and visit the White House as the winning team does each year). During the 2012 United States Presidential election campaign, Woodson publicly endorsed Obama at a political rally in Green Bay, stating "I believe in what he's trying to do."

On May 20, 2025, Woodson became a non-controlling limited partner of the Cleveland Browns.

== See also ==
- List of celebrities who own wineries and vineyards
- List of Las Vegas Raiders first-round draft picks
- List of NFL annual interceptions leaders
