= Mike Morton (linebacker) =

American football player (born 1972)

No. 50, 51, 53, 58
- Position: Linebacker

Personal information
- Born: March 28, 1972 (age 54); Concord, North Carolina, U.S.
- Listed height: 6 ft 4 in (1.93 m)
- Listed weight: 235 lb (107 kg)

Career information
- High school: A.L. Brown (Kannapolis, North Carolina)
- College: North Carolina
- NFL draft: 1995: 4th round, 118th overall pick

Career history
- Oakland Raiders (1995–1998); Green Bay Packers (1999)*; St. Louis Rams (1999); Green Bay Packers (2000); Indianapolis Colts (2001)
- * Offseason or practice squad member only

Awards and highlights
- Super Bowl champion (XXXIV)

Career NFL statistics
- Tackles: 183
- Sacks: 1
- Fumble recoveries: 4
- Stats at Pro Football Reference

Michael Anthony Morton (born March 28, 1972) is a National Football League (NFL) official and former American football linebacker. Morton played college football for the University of North Carolina Tar Heels and went on to play for four teams in a seven-year NFL career. He was drafted in the fourth round of the 1995 NFL Draft. During his NFL career. Morton played in 103 games (17 starts) and recorded 120 tackles, 50 assists, four fumble recoveries, and two interceptions. He was a member of the 1999 St. Louis Rams team that won Super Bowl XXXIV in January 2000.

Pre-draft measurables
Height	Weight	Arm length	Hand span	40-yard dash	10-yard split	20-yard split	20-yard shuttle	Vertical jump	Broad jump	Bench press
6 ft 3 3/4 in (1.92 m)	231 lb (105 kg)	30 3/4 in (0.78 m)	9 7/8 in (0.25 m)	4.74 s	1.74 s	2.83 s	4.25 s	34.5 in (0.88 m)	9 ft 5 in (2.87 m)	16 reps

Since his retirement from playing in the NFL, Morton has become a dentist and has opened his practice in Kannapolis, North Carolina.

Morton has been a football official since at least 2014, working in the Atlantic Coast Conference. As of 2019, Morton is also an official in the Alliance of American Football, working as an umpire on the crew led by referee Brandon Cruse. Morton worked his first NFL game on September 11, 2022, when the Atlanta Falcons hosted the New Orleans Saints, making him the first NFL official that also won a Super Bowl as a player. He works on Alex Kemp's crew.

In 2025 Morton was named to the officiating crew for Super Bowl LIX. He became the first person to officiate a Super Bowl after having won one as a player, and the second to officiate a Super Bowl after playing in one, joining Terry Killens. Coincidentally, they both appeared in Super Bowl XXXIV on opposite teams.

Morton and his wife are the parents of a son, as well as quadruplets.

== NFL career statistics ==
Legend
	Won the Super Bowl
**Bold**	Career high

=== Regular season ===
Year	Team	Games		Tackles				Interceptions				Fumbles			
Year	Team	GP	GS	Comb	Solo	Ast	Sck	Int	Yds	TD	Lng	FF	FR	Yds	TD
1995	OAK	12	0	3	3	0	0.0	0	0	0	0	0	1	0	0
1996	OAK	16	6	43	29	14	**1.0**	**2**	**13**	0	**13**	0	0	0	0
1997	OAK	11	11	**75**	**52**	**23**	0.0	0	0	0	0	0	1	0	0
1998	OAK	16	0	0	0	0	0.0	0	0	0	0	0	**2**	0	0
1999	STL	16	0	25	19	6	0.0	0	0	0	0	0	0	0	0
2000	GNB	16	0	15	8	7	0.0	0	0	0	0	0	0	0	0
2001	IND	16	0	22	13	9	0.0	0	0	0	0	**2**	0	0	0
		103	17	183	124	59	1.0	2	13	0	13	2	4	0	0

=== Playoffs ===
Year	Team	Games		Tackles				Interceptions				Fumbles			
Year	Team	GP	GS	Comb	Solo	Ast	Sck	Int	Yds	TD	Lng	FF	FR	Yds	TD
1999	STL	3	0	5	5	0	0.0	0	0	0	0	1	0	0	0
		3	0	5	5	0	0.0	0	0	0	0	1	0	0	0
