= Terry Mickens =

American football player (born 1971)

No. 85, 88
- Position: Wide receiver

Personal information
- Born: February 21, 1971 (age 55); Tallahassee, Florida, U.S.
- Listed height: 6 ft 0 in (1.83 m)
- Listed weight: 201 lb (91 kg)

Career information
- High school: Leon (Tallahassee)
- College: Florida A&M
- NFL draft: 1994: 5th round, 146th overall pick

Career history
- Green Bay Packers (1994–1997); Oakland Raiders (1998–2000)

Awards and highlights
- Super Bowl champion (XXXI); MEAC Offensive Player of the Year (1992); 2× First-team All-MEAC (1991, 1992)

Career NFL statistics
- Receptions: 70
- Receiving yards: 851
- Receiving touchdowns: 4
- Stats at Pro Football Reference

Terry KaJuan Mickens (born February 21, 1971) is an American former professional football player who was a wide receiver for the Green Bay Packers and Oakland Raiders from 1994 to 1999. He played college football at Florida A&M University.

== College career ==
After being a fringe Division I-AA All-America candidate, starting quarterback woes plagued Mickens' final college season. He was coached by former Cincinnati Bengals cornerback Ken Riley and ran a 4.5 second 40-yard dash.

== Professional career ==
=== Green Bay Packers ===
Mickens was selected by the Green Bay Packers in the fifth round (146th overall) of the 1994 NFL draft. He appeared in twelve games and caught four passes his rookie season. He continued to see sparse playing time his sophomore year. In 1996, he was part of the Super Bowl XXXI winning Green Bay Packers team, seeing his best action as a Packer to date, with 18 catches for 161 yards. He only caught two passes due to a high ankle sprain in 1997, his last year with the Packers.

=== Oakland Raiders ===
The Oakland Raiders signed Mickens in May 1998. His most productive season came in 1998, where he caught 24 passes for 346 yards and 1 touchdown. He earned playing time after beating out Desmond Howard, Olanda Truitt and Kenny Shedd for the No. 3 receiver position. In 1999, Mickens did not reach the end zone at all but still caught 20 passes. A neck injury before the 2000 season landed him on injured reserve for the entire season. He played in all 32 games he was healthy while he was in Oakland.

== Post career life ==
In 2004, he began scouting for the Philadelphia Eagles. He has one son, Tyler.
