= Gennaro DiNapoli =

American football player (born 1975)

No. 64, 66, 63
- Positions: Guard, center

Personal information
- Born: May 25, 1975 (age 51); Manhasset, New York, U.S.
- Listed height: 6 ft 3 in (1.91 m)
- Listed weight: 287 lb (130 kg)

Career information
- High school: Milford Academy (CT)
- College: Virginia Tech
- NFL draft: 1998: 4th round, 109th overall pick

Career history
- Oakland Raiders (1998–1999); Tennessee Titans (2000–2002); Dallas Cowboys (2003–2004)

Awards and highlights
- All-Big East (1997)

Career NFL statistics
- Games played: 39
- Games started: 27
- Fumble recoveries: 1
- Stats at Pro Football Reference

Gennaro L. DiNapoli (born May 25, 1975) is an American former professional football player who was a center and guard in the National Football League for the Oakland Raiders, Tennessee Titans, and Dallas Cowboys. He played college football for the Virginia Tech Hokies and was selected in the fourth round of the 1998 NFL draft.

== Early life ==
DiNapoli attended Cazenovia High School. He transferred to Milford Academy after his junior season. He was a two-way player at tight end and defensive tackle. He received All-league honors as a senior.

He accepted a football scholarship from Virginia Tech University. As a redshirt freshman, he was a backup at left tackle.

As a sophomore, he started the last 8 games at right guard. As a junior, he was named the starter at right guard and appeared in every game.

As a senior, he started every game at the right guard position.

== Professional career ==
=== Oakland Raiders ===
DiNapoli was selected by the Oakland Raiders in the fourth round (109th overall) of the 1998 NFL draft. As a rookie, he was declared active in only 4 games, but did not play.

In 1999, he started the first 8 contests at right guard, before injuring his ribs. He returned as a backup behind Barry Sims.

On August 27, 2000, he was traded to the Tennessee Titans in exchange for a seventh round pick (#229-Ken-Yon Rambo).

=== Tennessee Titans ===
In 2000, he was declared active in 4 games, but did not play. On June 14, 2001, he was re-signed to a one-year contract. He appeared in 5 games with 2 starts at center in place of an injured Kevin Long.

In 2002, he was named the starter at center, replacing the retired Bruce Matthews. He started all 16 games and 2 playoff contests. He contributed to an offensive line that allowed just 21 sacks (second lowest in the NFL) and helped running back Eddie George rush for his sixth 1,100-yard season. He was not re-signed after the season because of salary cap reasons.

=== Dallas Cowboys ===
On August 6, 2003, he was signed as a free agent by the Dallas Cowboys, to provide depth after second round draft choice Al Johnson was lost for the season with a knee injury. He appeared as a backup center in 7 games behind Matt Lehr, before suffering a high ankle sprain in the seventh contest against the Tampa Bay Buccaneers. On October 29, he was placed on the injured reserve list with cartilage damage to his knee and a high ankle sprain.

In 2004, he missed all of training camp with a stress fracture in his right ankle. On August 31, he was placed on the reserve/physically unable to perform list. On November 9, he was placed on the injured reserve list. He was released on February 22, 2005.
