= Jon Gruden =

American football coach (born 1963)

- Gruden in 2026

Personal information
- Born: August 17, 1963 (age 63); Sandusky, Ohio, U.S.

Career information
- High school: Clay (South Bend, Indiana)
- College: Muskingum (1982); Dayton (1983–1985)

Career history
- Tennessee (1986–1987) Graduate assistant; Southeast Missouri State (1988) Passing game coordinator; Pacific (1989) Tight ends coach; San Francisco 49ers (1990) Offensive assistant; Pittsburgh (1991) Wide receivers coach; Green Bay Packers (1992–1994); Offensive assistant/quality control coach (1992); Wide receivers coach (1993–1994); Philadelphia Eagles (1995–1997) Offensive coordinator; Oakland Raiders (1998–2001) Head coach; Tampa Bay Buccaneers (2002–2008) Head coach; Oakland / Las Vegas Raiders (2018–2021) Head coach; New Orleans Saints (2023) Consultant; Milano Seamen (2024) Advisor

Awards and highlights
- Super Bowl champion (XXXVII); Tampa Bay Buccaneers Ring of Honor

Head coaching record
- Regular season: 117–112 (.511)
- Postseason: 5–4 (.556)
- Career: 122–116 (.513)
- Coaching profile at Pro Football Reference

Jon David Gruden (born August 17, 1963) is an American former football coach and media personality, currently employed by Barstool Sports.

After beginning his coaching career in the college ranks and working as a position coach and as an offensive coordinator in the National Football League (NFL) for the Philadelphia Eagles, he held his first head coaching position with the Raiders during their Oakland tenure from 1998 to 2001, where he won two consecutive division titles and made an AFC Championship Game appearance. Gruden was traded by Raiders owner and general manager Al Davis to the Tampa Bay Buccaneers in 2002, which he led to their first Super Bowl title in Super Bowl XXXVII the same season. At age 39, he was the then-youngest head coach to win the Super Bowl. He served as Tampa Bay's head coach through 2008, setting the franchise record for wins, but made only two further playoff runs. After his firing from the Buccaneers, Gruden was featured as an analyst for ESPN's Monday Night Football broadcasts from the 2009 to the 2017 seasons.

In 2018, Gruden returned to the Raiders as their head coach. He led the team until his resignation during the 2021 season after it was publicly revealed that he wrote and sent many racist, misogynistic, and homophobic emails between 2011 and 2018.

In 2023, Gruden was hired by the New Orleans Saints as an offseason consultant, assisting the coaching staff with installing their offense upon the signing of Derek Carr, Gruden’s starting quarterback in his second stint with the Raiders.

== Early life ==
Gruden was born on August 17, 1963, in Sandusky, Ohio, into a family of Slovene descent. His father, Jim, later served as a professional football regional scout, quarterbacks coach, and director of player personnel for the Tampa Bay Buccaneers. Gruden's younger brother, Jay, played and coached in the Arena Football League for the Tampa Bay Storm and Orlando Predators, and was the head coach of the Washington Redskins. His other brother, James, is a radiologist at UNC School of Medicine.

Gruden was raised Catholic and was a Cleveland Browns fan growing up. At age 15, he attended Clay High School in South Bend, Indiana, home to the University of Notre Dame, where Jim served as an assistant to head coach Dan Devine. After graduating in 1982, Gruden attended and played quarterback for Muskingum College in New Concord, Ohio. After one season at Muskingum, he transferred to the University of Dayton. At Dayton, Gruden was a three-year letterman and backup quarterback for the Flyers under coach Mike Kelly and was a teammate of U.S. Senator Jon Husted. Gruden never saw much playing time, but the Flyers posted a 24–7 record during his three seasons at the University of Dayton. Gruden graduated with a degree in communications in 1986.

== Coaching career ==
=== College coaching (1986–1991) ===
After graduating from the University of Dayton, Gruden was hired as a graduate assistant coach at the University of Tennessee during the 1985–86 season. After his time with the Volunteers, Gruden spent two years as the quarterbacks coach at Southeast Missouri State. He then moved to the University of the Pacific in 1989 as offensive assistant as the tight ends coach. Walt Harris was the offensive coordinator at Tennessee, where Gruden was one of his graduate assistant coaches, and later hired him at Pacific. In 1990, Gruden was a special assistant with the San Francisco 49ers under quarterbacks coach Mike Holmgren. In March 1991, Gruden became the wide receivers coach for the University of Pittsburgh under head coach Paul Hackett.

=== Green Bay Packers & Philadelphia Eagles (1992–1997) ===
In January 1992, at age 28, Gruden was hired by Mike Holmgren, his former boss at the San Francisco 49ers, to be the special offensive assistant/wide receivers coach with the Green Bay Packers. After three seasons in Green Bay, Gruden became the offensive coordinator of the Philadelphia Eagles under former Packers assistant coach Ray Rhodes. Gruden was chosen by the owner and general manager of the Oakland Raiders, Al Davis, to be the Raiders' new head coach for the 1998 season.

=== Oakland Raiders (1998–2001) ===
Under Gruden, the Raiders posted consecutive 8–8 seasons in 1998 and 1999, and leapt out of last place in the AFC West. After uniting with journeyman quarterback Rich Gannon, Gruden led the Raiders to the top of the AFC West and they made the playoffs in 2000 and 2001. Oakland finished 12–4 in the 2000 season, the team's most successful season in a decade, and its first division title since 1990, ultimately reaching the AFC Championship, where they lost, 16–3, to the eventual Super Bowl champion Baltimore Ravens. In 2001, the Raiders would return to the postseason with a 10–6 record, but in the AFC Divisional Round a negated fumble proved costly as they were defeated, 16–13, in overtime by the eventual Super Bowl champions New England Patriots. While Gruden was with the Raiders, Gruden acquired his nickname "Chucky" from Raiders defensive lineman Grady Jackson, who thought that the coach looked like the fictional character "Chucky" in the 1988 slasher movie Child's Play.

=== Tampa Bay Buccaneers (2002–2008) ===
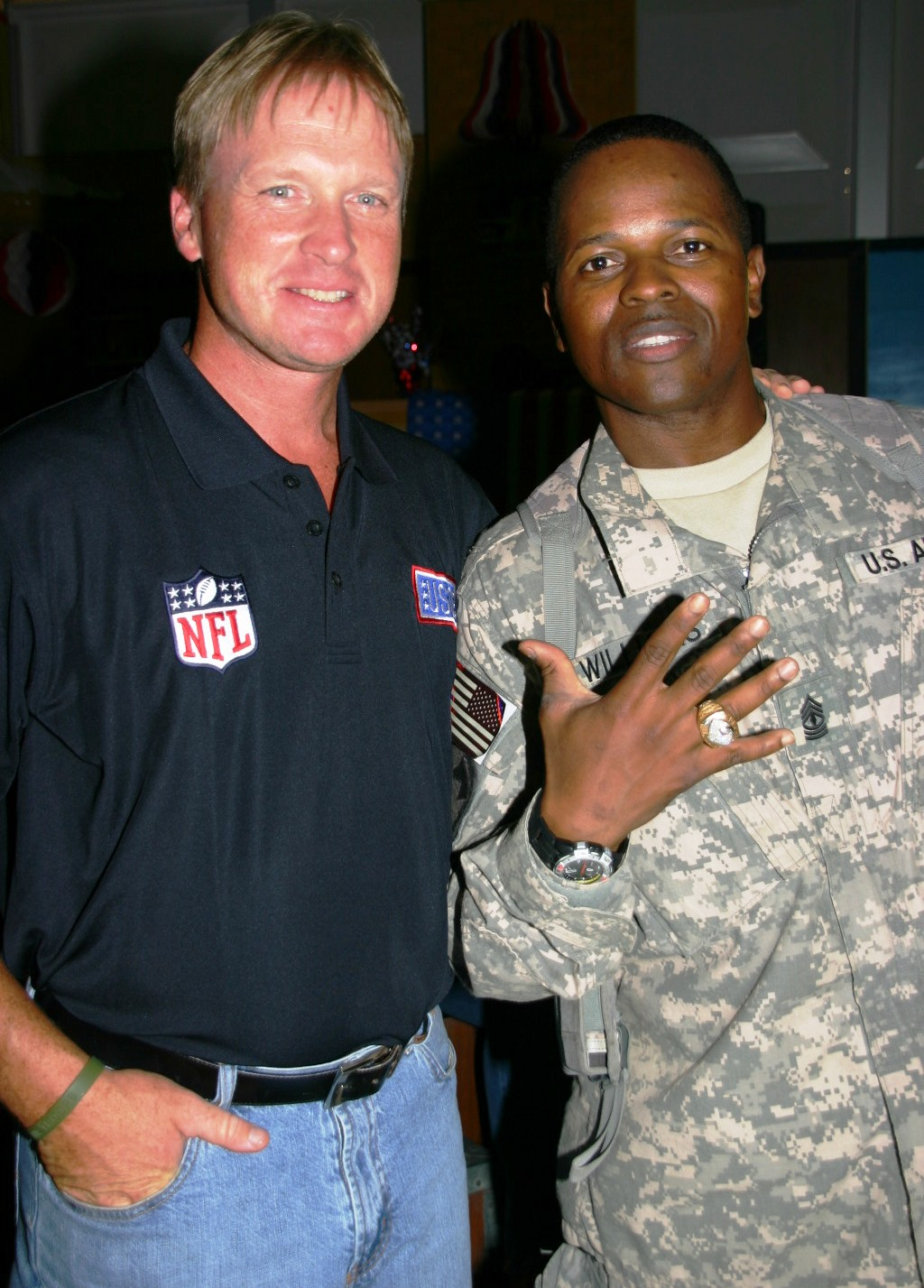
Gruden during a USO tour of Iraq in July 2009, where a soldier tries on his Super Bowl ring.

After compiling a 40–28 win–loss record (including playoffs) in four seasons with the Raiders, Gruden replaced the fired Tony Dungy as head coach of the Tampa Bay Buccaneers in 2002, via a high-stakes trade that included Tampa Bay's 2002 and 2003 first-round draft picks, 2002 and 2004 second-round draft picks, and $8 million in cash. According to one source, Davis detailed the trade as such: "I never liked it when teams would interfere with coaches under contract...Tampa Bay came to me and they said they wanted Gruden...I felt that I put the price tag so high that they wouldn't agree to it. And they did. Gruden is no longer our coach." Gruden signed a five-year contract with the Buccaneers worth $17.5 million.

The Buccaneers' search for a head coach had taken more than two months, and Tampa Bay had expressed an interest in Gruden, but Davis had originally refused to release him from his contract. The team subsequently interviewed several other coaches and believed a deal was in place with Bill Parcells, before Parcells backed out, reportedly because his choice for General Manager, Mike Tannenbaum, told him not to accept the job because of the salary cap difficulties that Tampa Bay was about to endure. With the franchise's search floundering, the fact that the coach who the Buccaneers wanted had only one year remaining on his deal, and the immediate hire of Dungy by the Indianapolis Colts, many fans and sports commentators began to openly question if the Buccaneers had made the right move by dismissing Dungy. Only a big splash hire could quiet the storm, and this may have been the primary motivation for the Buccaneers to give up as much as they did to acquire Gruden.

Immediately after arriving in Tampa Bay, Gruden significantly retooled the offense with the addition of numerous free agents. His determination to fix the under-performing offense, so often maligned during Dungy's tenure, inspired Tampa's defense to another #1 ranking, which helped the team to a 12–4 season. Both the offense and defense hit their stride in the playoffs; the Buccaneers posted a playoff per-game point differential of 23 points per game in victory, tied with the 1992 Dallas Cowboys for the highest average playoff margin of victory by a Super Bowl winner in the free agency era. Fans were especially satisfied with a victory in the NFC Championship against the Philadelphia Eagles, the team that had defeated Tampa Bay in the wild-card round two years running by the combined score of 52–12, and Gruden was especially satisfied with a dominant win over his old team, the Raiders, in Super Bowl XXXVII. Despite the Super Bowl win, there were many who attributed Gruden's win primarily to the defense that coach Tony Dungy and defensive coordinator Monte Kiffin had created during Dungy's tenure with the Buccaneers. Gruden, for his part, publicly and graciously thanked Dungy for his contributions upon accepting the Lombardi Trophy at the Super Bowl XXXVII postgame ceremony.

The victory made Gruden the youngest head coach to win the Super Bowl at age 39. This record would first be surpassed in Super Bowl XLIII by Mike Tomlin, who previously served under Gruden as the Buccaneers' defensive backs coach, and then by Sean McVay in Super Bowl LVI.

Gruden's mantra for the 2002 season was "Pound the Rock", a reference to commitment to the running game. Upon returning to Tampa after winning Super Bowl XXXVII, he led a capacity crowd at Raymond James Stadium in chanting the phrase. However, it seemingly disappeared from the lexicon the following year, and was not aggressively marketed or displayed on stadium video boards.

Unable to afford replacements, the following season saw the team decimated by injuries to many of the Super Bowl stars, including Joe Jurevicius, Greg Spires, Shelton Quarles, and Brian Kelly, as well as acrimony with highly paid veterans such as Warren Sapp and wide receivers Keyshawn Johnson and Keenan McCardell. The Buccaneers finished 7–9 in 2003 and 5–11 in 2004 to become the first team to have consecutive losing seasons after winning the Super Bowl. A particular low point during this period occurred in a Monday Night Football home matchup against the Indianapolis Colts, led by Gruden's predecessor Dungy. The Buccaneers dominated much of the game, allowing them to take a 35–14 lead near the end of the fourth quarter, but were overcome by a Colts rally that resulted in them losing 38–35.

When former Raiders general manager Bruce Allen joined the Buccaneers in 2004, Gruden finally had the general manager–head coach partnership he desired, and while the salary cap continued to plague the team (which spent the least money in the league between 2004 and 2009) their 2004 and 2005 drafts yielded a few impact players, including 2005 Offensive NFL Rookie of the Year Award winner Carnell "Cadillac" Williams.

Also, 2005 marked a return to the playoffs, as the Buccaneers posted a surprising 11–5 record, despite the loss of starting quarterback Brian Griese and some controversial coaching decisions, including a two-point conversion in the final seconds to defeat the Washington Redskins, who would later return to Tampa Bay and eliminate the Buccaneers from the Wild Card Round of the playoffs.

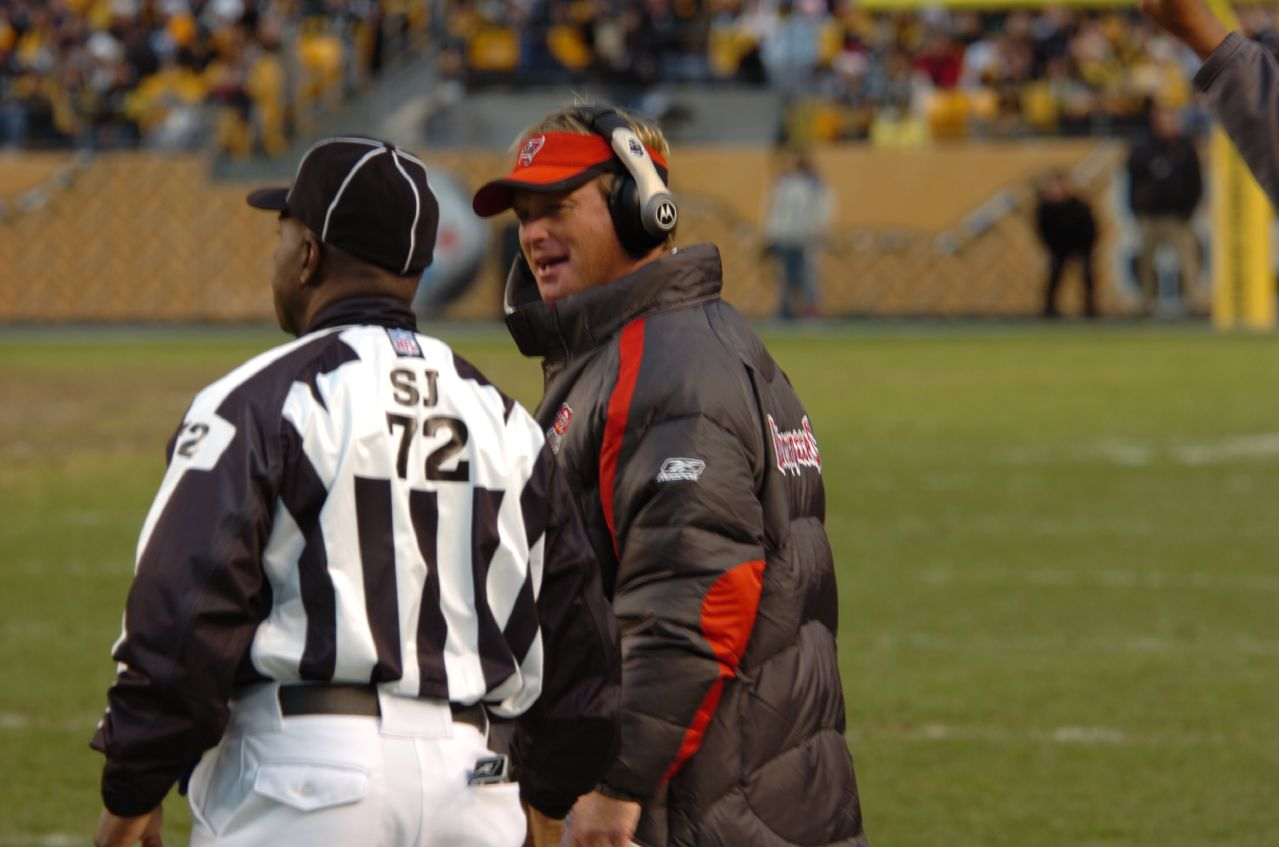
Gruden speaking to an official at Heinz Field in December 2006

In 2006, Gruden led the Buccaneers to a dismal 4–12 season, which was his worst record as a head coach. That season marked the first time a Tampa Bay team had not won more than four games since 1991.

In an interview with Ira Kaufman of The Tampa Tribune on March 28, 2007, Buccaneers executive vice president Joel Glazer discussed the state of the Buccaneers. During the interview, Glazer defended Gruden's performance, citing lost draft picks, injuries, and salary cap issues. However, he also said "Mediocrity will never be standard for the Buccaneers, but we have to move on."

In 2007, the team finally cleared itself of salary cap constraints and united Gruden with a mobile West Coast quarterback in former Pro Bowler and Grey Cup winner Jeff Garcia. The Buccaneers returned to the playoffs in 2007 with a 9–7 record, including five divisional wins (after resting starters for the final two games) and despite suffering major injuries, several season-ending, to critical players like Luke Petitgout, Carnell Williams, Mike Alstott, Alex Smith, Brian Kelly, Barrett Ruud, Michael Clayton, Patrick Chukwurah, Gaines Adams, and starting kick and punt returner Mark Jones. Despite this adversity, however, Gruden declared "The future is so bright around here I have to wear shades". The Buccaneers saw their season end in the Wild Card Round to the eventual Super Bowl XLII champion New York Giants.

In 2008, Gruden was rewarded with a contract extension through the 2011 season. Going into December, the Buccaneers were on pace to make the playoffs, claim a bye week and have home field advantage. However, the Buccaneers went winless in the month of December, in no small part due to a defensive collapse that saw the team give up an average of 30.75 points per game. On December 28, the Buccaneers were eliminated from making the playoffs by the Oakland Raiders, the team Gruden left for Tampa Bay. The Buccaneers ended the season with four losses in a row, and Gruden was fired by the Buccaneers on January 16, 2009, after seven seasons with the team.

=== Post–Tampa Bay career ===
In May 2010, Gruden became a volunteer assistant offensive line coach at Carrollwood Day School in Tampa, Florida. Shortly after being fired from Tampa Bay, Gruden created the Fired Football Coaches Association (FFCA). The organization (a "football think-tank") had its headquarters in a rented office in a Tampa strip mall. The FFCA was known to have a large amount of game and player film collected by Gruden as well as playbooks and Gruden was known to have game plans of his own that he kept updated over the years he was not actively coaching. Many coaches such as Chip Kelly, Urban Meyer, Jim Haslett, Rick Venturi, Sean McVay, Greg Schiano and Monte Kiffin and many players came to the facility to watch film and talk with Gruden. Gruden closed the FFCA upon his returning to coaching in 2018 moving the game and player film along with the other information he held there to Oakland.

=== Oakland / Las Vegas Raiders (2018–2021) ===
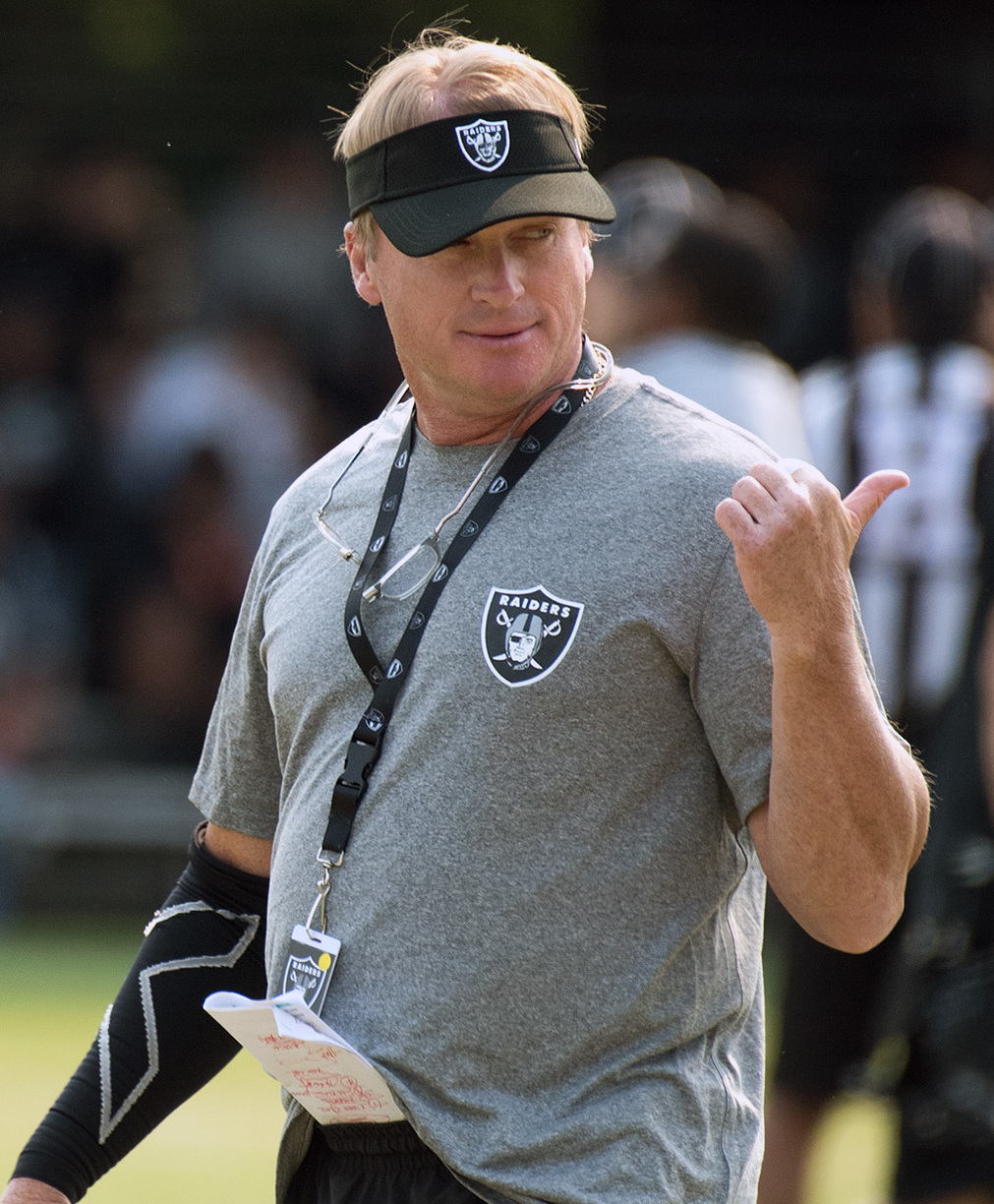
Gruden with the Raiders in 2018

After nine years away from coaching in the NFL, the Raiders announced the return of Gruden as head coach on January 6, 2018. He signed a 10-year, $100 million contract, one of the biggest contracts in the history of the league which also includes a no-trade clause, closing the loophole that saw the Raiders trade him to the Buccaneers in return for draft picks and cash. Gruden came back to coaching after six years of attempts by Raiders owner Mark Davis to lure him back to be the Raiders head coach. Gruden said that he came back due to his need to go compete: "I got tired of sitting in a dark room, watching tape by myself." He added: "I took rumba-dancing classes; that didn't last—I wasn't any good. Bought a boat; I never used it. Live on a golf course; I never play. I'd go to the FFCA early, and next thing I know it's 10:30 at night. I'm thinking, Shit. I'm wasting my time. I got to go compete." Some of Gruden's first few moves included signing several veterans, drafting Kolton Miller in the first round of the 2018 draft and trading away Khalil Mack for 2019 and 2020 first-round draft picks, and later trading Amari Cooper for the Dallas Cowboys' first-round draft pick. The team finished 4–12 in his first year back with the team.

In 2019, due to a strong rookie class showing, Gruden led the Raiders to a 6–4 record to start the season. However, after many crucial players suffering injuries, the Raiders ended their last season in Oakland 1–5 and 7–9 overall.

Gruden was fined $100,000 by the NFL for not properly wearing a face mask, as required for coaches during the COVID-19 pandemic, during a Week 2 game in the 2020 NFL season on September 22, 2020. He was fined an additional $150,000 for further COVID-19 protocol violations on November 5, 2020. Gruden led the Raiders to an 8–8 record in the 2020 season. The Raiders finished second in the AFC West with an 8-8 record and missed the playoffs.

The Raiders began the 2021 season with a 3–0 record, including two overtime wins. The Raiders lost the following two games. Under their interim coach Rich Bisaccia, the Raiders made the playoffs, something they had not done under Gruden during his second stint with the team.

==== Email controversy and resignation ====
In October 2021, a league investigation into the Washington Football Team for workplace misconduct uncovered emails Gruden sent from 2011 to 2018 to then Washington general manager Bruce Allen where Gruden used racist, misogynistic, and homophobic slurs. The emails referred to NFL commissioner Roger Goodell as a "faggot", and a "clueless anti football pussy". Gruden also said Goodell should not have pressured the Rams to draft "queers", referring to Michael Sam, the first openly gay player drafted in NFL history. Jeff Fisher, who was the coach of the Rams at the time, denied that he was pressured and stated he drafted Sam entirely based on his football skills. Gruden stated that players who protest the national anthem should be "fired", specifically referring to former 49ers safety Eric Reid. Gruden used a racist stereotype to describe NFLPA executive director DeMaurice Smith, saying "Dumboriss Smith has lips the size of michellin [sic] tires". Gruden also criticized Barack Obama during his 2012 re-election campaign and called then–Vice President Joe Biden a "nervous clueless pussy". Gruden also joked to Allen that he should tell Bryan Glazer, co-owner of the Buccaneers, to perform oral sex on Gruden, and mocked Caitlyn Jenner for receiving an ESPN award following her gender transition. Gruden, Allen and others were sent emails from unknown members of the Washington Football Team staff that contained photos of topless women, including two Washington Football Team cheerleaders. Gruden resigned on October 11, 2021, after details of the emails were released by The New York Times. Gruden announced his intentions to sue the NFL and Roger Goodell for exposing his scandals. A Nevada judge threw out a bid from the NFL to dismiss the case on May 25, 2022.

Gruden was removed from the Buccaneers Ring of Honor, where he had been inducted in 2017, as a result of the content of the emails. However, in February 2025, the Buccaneers announced Gruden would be reinstated onto the Ring of Honor.

=== New Orleans Saints (2023) ===
Gruden was invited by New Orleans Saints head coach Dennis Allen to attend offseason meetings in May 2023 to help the offensive coaching staff adjust to new Saints quarterback Derek Carr, but did not join as a full-time member of the staff, himself. Gruden was spotted with the Saints training camp in August 2023 and was expected to continue his advisory role.

=== Milano Seamen (2024) ===
In March 2024, it was announced that Gruden had joined the Milano Seamen of the European League of Football as an advisor.

=== Hula Bowl (2026) ===
Gruden was one of the two head coaches at the 2026 Hula Bowl. The other coach was his brother, Jay Gruden. The event was also known as the "Gruden Bowl." A documentary on the Gruden Bowl/2026 Hula Bowl was released on January 30, 2026.

== Broadcasting and media career ==
=== ESPN (2009–2018) ===
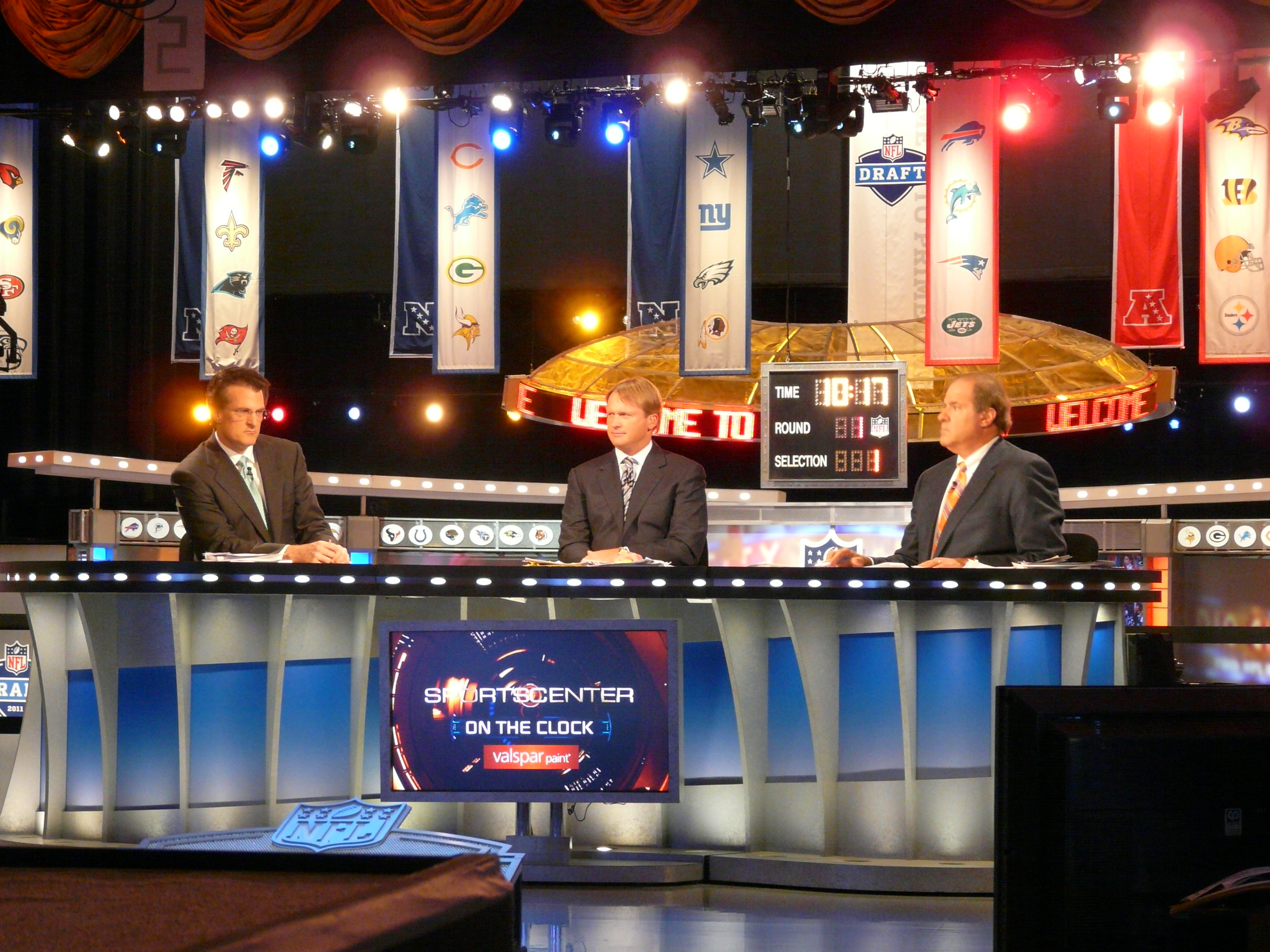
Gruden (center) at the 2011 NFL draft with ESPN

In May 2009, Gruden was hired by ESPN to serve as a color analyst on its Monday Night Football telecasts, replacing Tony Kornheiser. He also served as an analyst for ESPN's coverage of the NFL draft and postseason college football games, helping to call the 2010 Rose Bowl and 2010 BCS National Championship Game on ESPN Radio and the 2011 Outback Bowl and 2011 Orange Bowl on ESPN. In the spring of 2012, Gruden became the focus of the series Jon Gruden's QB Camp, where he went over the NFL development process with prospective NFL draftees at quarterback, including Andrew Luck and Robert Griffin III. During the Monday Night Football broadcast, Gruden gave out a weekly award called the "Gruden Grinder" to the best player in the game that week.

Gruden signed a contract extension with ESPN, beginning in September 2012, that lengthened his tenure with the broadcasting company for another five years. On December 15, 2014, Gruden and ESPN agreed to a contract extension through 2021 but allowed an opt-out in the event he wanted to return to coaching. The deal made Gruden the highest paid personality at ESPN. After deciding to return to the coaching ranks with the Raiders for the 2018 NFL season, his last game for ESPN was the 2017 AFC Wild Card Round between the Tennessee Titans and the Kansas City Chiefs, which the Titans narrowly won 22–21.

=== Barstool Sports (2024–present) ===
Gruden joined Barstool Sports in November 2024. He is featured on shows such as The Pro Football Football Show, Wake Up Barstool (Mondays), and Gruden's QB Class, and was previously on the Shred Line. In August 2025, Gruden participated in the Internet Invitational, a million-dollar plus Youtube golf event organized by Barstool Sports. On the first day of the event, Gruden gave an inspiring speech to his team to try to rally them to a comeback.

== Coaching tree ==
NFL head coaches under whom Gruden has served:

Coach	Team	Year(s)
George Seifert	San Francisco 49ers	1990
Mike Holmgren	Green Bay Packers	1992–1994
Ray Rhodes	Philadelphia Eagles	1995–1997

Assistant coaches under Gruden who have become NFL or NCAA head coaches:

Coach	Team	Year(s)
Bill Callahan	Oakland Raiders	2002–2003
Rod Marinelli	Detroit Lions	2006–2008
Mike Tomlin	Pittsburgh Steelers	2007–2025
Stan Parrish	Ball State Cardinals	2008–2010
Raheem Morris	Tampa Bay Buccaneers; Atlanta Falcons	2009–2011; 2024–2025
David Shaw	Stanford Cardinal	2011–2022
Marc Trestman	Chicago Bears	2013–2014
Gus Bradley	Jacksonville Jaguars	2013–2016
Jay Gruden	Washington Redskins	2014–2019
Kyle Shanahan	San Francisco 49ers	2017–present
Sean McVay	Los Angeles Rams	2017–present
Jimmy Lake	Washington Huskies	2020–2021
Nathaniel Hackett	Denver Broncos	2022
Brian Callahan	Tennessee Titans	2024–2025

Players under Gruden who became head coaches in the NFL or NCAA:

Coach	Team	Year(s)
Reggie Barlow	Alabama State; Virginia State	2007–2014; 2016–2021
Jason Garrett	Dallas Cowboys	2010–2019
Marques Tuiasosopo	Washington	2013, interim
Zac Taylor	Cincinnati Bengals	2019–present

Executives/players under Gruden who became general managers in the NFL:

Executive/player	Team	Year(s)
Dennis Hickey	Miami Dolphins	2014–2015
John Lynch	San Francisco 49ers	2017–present

== Head coaching record ==
Team	Year	Regular season					Postseason			
Team	Year	Won	Lost	Ties	Win %	Finish	Won	Lost	Win %	Result
OAK	1998	8	8	0	.500	3rd in AFC West	—	—	—	—
OAK	1999	8	8	0	.500	4th in AFC West	—	—	—	—
OAK	2000	12	4	0	.750	1st in AFC West	1	1	.500	Lost to Baltimore Ravens in AFC Championship Game
OAK	2001	10	6	0	.625	1st in AFC West	1	1	.500	Lost to New England Patriots in AFC Divisional Game
OAK total		38	26	0	.594		2	2	.500	
TB	2002	12	4	0	.750	1st in NFC South	3	0	1.000	Super Bowl XXXVII champions
TB	2003	7	9	0	.438	3rd in NFC South	—	—	—	—
TB	2004	5	11	0	.313	4th in NFC South	—	—	—	—
TB	2005	11	5	0	.688	1st in NFC South	0	1	.000	Lost to Washington Redskins in NFC Wild Card Game
TB	2006	4	12	0	.250	4th in NFC South	—	—	—	—
TB	2007	9	7	0	.563	1st in NFC South	0	1	.000	Lost to New York Giants in NFC Wild Card Game
TB	2008	9	7	0	.563	3rd in NFC South	—	—	—	—
TB total		57	55	0	.509		3	2	.600	
OAK	2018	4	12	0	.250	4th in AFC West	—	—	—	—
OAK	2019	7	9	0	.438	3rd in AFC West	—	—	—	—
LV	2020	8	8	0	.500	2nd in AFC West	—	—	—	—
LV	2021	3 (Note: Gruden coached the first five games of the season before he resigned on October 11. Rich Bisaccia was named interim head coach to replace him. The first five games are credited to Gruden, and the final 12 to Bisaccia.)	2	0	.600	Resigned	—	—	—	—
OAK/LV total		22	31	0	.415		0	0	–	
Total		117	112	0	.511		5	4	.556	

== Personal life ==
Gruden met his wife in 1985, while he was working as a graduate assistant and she was a student at the University of Tennessee. They were married in 1991 and have three sons. One of Gruden's sons, Jon II (aka Deuce), is the assistant strength and conditioning coach for the Raiders and a competitive powerlifter who won gold at the 2017 IPF World Classic Powerlifting Championships in the junior 83 kg weight class.
