= Rodney Williams (wide receiver) =

American football player (born 1973)

No. 89, 17
- Position: Wide receiver

Personal information
- Born: August 15, 1973 (age 53); Oakland, California, U.S.
- Listed height: 6 ft 0 in (1.83 m)
- Listed weight: 185 lb (84 kg)

Career information
- High school: Palmdale (Palmdale, California)
- College: Arizona
- NFL draft: 1998: undrafted

Career history
- Oakland Raiders (1998–1999); Barcelona Dragons (2000); Green Bay Packers (2001)*; San Diego Chargers (2001)*
- * Offseason or practice squad member only

Career NFL statistics
- Return yards: 63
- Stats at Pro Football Reference

Rodney Allen Williams (born August 15, 1973) is an American former professional football player who was a wide receiver for two seasons with the Oakland Raiders of the National Football League (NFL). He first enrolled at Los Angeles Pierce College before transferring to play college football for the Arizona Wildcats. Williams was also a member of the Barcelona Dragons, Green Bay Packers and San Diego Chargers.

== Early life ==
Williams attended Palmdale High School in Palmdale, California.

== Professional baseball career ==
Williams was selected by the Kansas City Royals in the 37th round of the 1991 MLB June Amateur Draft. He spent two years as an outfielder in the Kansas City Royals organization, playing for the GCL Royals in 1991 and the Lethbridge Mounties in 1992, before enrolling at Los Angeles Pierce College to play football.

== College career ==
Williams first played college football in 1994 at Los Angeles Pierce College. He then transferred to play for the Wildcats at the University of Arizona from 1995 to 1997, recording career totals of 1,536 yards and 12 touchdowns on 112 receptions.

== Professional football career ==
Williams signed with the Oakland Raiders after going undrafted in the 1998 NFL draft. He played in six games for the Raiders from 1998 to 1999. He played for the Barcelona Dragons of NFL Europe during the 2000 season. He was released by the Raiders on August 27, 2000. Williams was signed by the Green Bay Packers on March 12, 2001. He was released by the Packers on March 20, 2001. He signed with the San Diego Chargers on March 29, 2001. Williams was released by the Chargers on September 2, 2001.

== Personal life ==
Williams was born with only one kidney. He is referenced in the song "Palmdale" by Afroman, in the lyric "Turn on the TV/ then I see / different homeboys that went to school with me/ playing in the NFL/ We used to kick back in East Palmdale / Rodney Williams, ..."
