= Travian Smith =

American football player (born 1975)

No. 53
- Position: Linebacker

Personal information
- Born: August 26, 1975 (age 51); Shepherd, Texas, U.S.
- Listed height: 6 ft 4 in (1.93 m)
- Listed weight: 240 lb (109 kg)

Career information
- College: Oklahoma
- NFL draft: 1998: 5th round, 152nd overall pick

Career history
- Oakland Raiders (1998–2004)

Career NFL statistics
- Tackles: 220
- Sacks: 8.5
- Interceptions: 1
- Stats at Pro Football Reference

Travian Smith (born August 26, 1975, in Shepherd, Texas) is an American former professional football player who was a linebacker in the National Football League. He played college football for the Oklahoma Sooners and was selected by the Oakland Raiders in the fifth round of the 1998 NFL draft with the 152nd overall pick.

Pre-draft measurables
Height	Weight	Arm length	Hand span	40-yard dash	10-yard split	20-yard split	Vertical jump	Broad jump	Bench press
6 ft 3 7/8 in (1.93 m)	238 lb (108 kg)	33 3/4 in (0.86 m)	10 5/8 in (0.27 m)	4.44 s	1.60 s	2.63 s	32.5 in (0.83 m)	10 ft 0 in (3.05 m)	15 reps

Smith played for the Raiders from 1998 to 2004.
