= Rick Cunningham (American football) =

American gridiron football player (born 1967)

No. 72, 64, 67, 68, 52
- Position: Offensive tackle

Personal information
- Born: January 4, 1967 (age 59); Los Angeles, California, U.S.
- Listed height: 6 ft 7 in (2.01 m)
- Listed weight: 305 lb (138 kg)

Career information
- High school: Beverly Hills (CA)
- College: Sacramento City College; Texas A&M
- NFL draft: 1990: 4th round, 106th overall pick

Career history
- Indianapolis Colts (1990); Orlando Thunder (1992); Phoenix/Arizona Cardinals (1992–1994); Minnesota Vikings (1995); Oakland Raiders (1996–1998); Montreal Alouettes (2000); Edmonton Eskimos (2000–2001); Montreal Alouettes (2002); Las Vegas Gladiators (2003–2005)

Awards and highlights
- Grey Cup champion (2002)

Career NFL statistics
- Games played: 80
- Games started: 33
- Fumble recoveries: 2
- Stats at Pro Football Reference

Patrick Dante Ross Cunningham (born January 4, 1967) is an American former professional football player who was an offensive tackle in the National Football League (NFL), World League of American Football (WLAF), and Canadian Football League (CFL).

Originally known as Pat Cunningham, he played scholastically at Beverly Hills High School before spending a redshirt season at Oregon. He transferred to Sacramento City College for one season after which he signed a National Letter of Intent to Tennessee. However, he was determined to be academically ineligible due to not having graduated from SCC, so he returned there for a second year. As a sophomore at SCC, Cunningham earned second team JUCO All-American honors. He then spent his final two years of collegiate eligibility with Texas A&M.

Cunningham was selected by the Indianapolis Colts in the fourth round of the 1990 NFL draft. He appeared in two games with the Colts that year, and spent the 1991 training camp and pre-season with them before being released at their final cutdown.

He was then selected by the Orlando Thunder in the third round of the 1992 WLAF Draft. He went on to become the only unanimous selection for the All-World League Team, as the Thunder qualified for the World Bowl, losing to the Sacramento Surge.

Following the WLAF season, Cunningham returned to the NFL, signing with the Phoenix Cardinals. He spent three years in Phoenix, before signing with the Minnesota Vikings for a year, and then three seasons with the Oakland Raiders.

Cunningham finished his career with three years in the CFL, splitting time between the Montreal Alouettes and Edmonton Eskimos.
