= Adam Treu =

American football player (born 1974)

No. 62
- Position: Center

Personal information
- Born: June 24, 1974 (age 52); Lincoln, Nebraska, U.S.
- Listed height: 6 ft 5 in (1.96 m)
- Listed weight: 300 lb (136 kg)

Career information
- High school: Pius X (Lincoln, Nebraska)
- College: Nebraska
- NFL draft: 1997: 3rd round, 72nd overall pick

Career history
- Oakland Raiders (1997–2006)

Awards and highlights
- 2× National champion (1994, 1995)

Career NFL statistics
- Games played: 155
- Games started: 44
- Fumble recoveries: 2
- Stats at Pro Football Reference

Adam R. Treu (born June 24, 1974) is an American former professional football player who was a center for the Oakland Raiders of the National Football League (NFL). He played college football for the Nebraska Cornhuskers, joining as a walk-on after playing at Pius X High School in Lincoln, Nebraska. He won back-to-back national championships with the Cornhuskers in 1994 and 1995 playing left tackle and performing all the long snapping duties. He was selected by the Oakland Raiders in the third round (72nd overall) of the 1997 NFL draft.

== Raider center ==
From 1997 to 2003, Treu was the reserve center behind Barret Robbins, but when Robbins was injured during the 2001 NFL season, Treu capably filled his place during 14 games. Oakland scored 399 points (24.9 points/game), 4th of 31 teams in the NFL and won the AFC west for the second year in a row. In the 2001–02 NFL playoffs, the offensive line, composed of Treu, Steve Wisniewski and Frank Middleton at guard, Barry Sims and Lincoln Kennedy at tackle, pulverized the New York Jets's defense with 215 yards on the ground and 287 yards in the air in a wild card game, but lost to the New England Patriots in the divisional round, the infamous Tuck rule game when Tom Brady was judged not to have fumbled.

Despite Treu's success, Robbins regained his starting position the following year, up to the day before Super Bowl XXXVII, when reported missing, then found in a manic state. Treu started Super Bowl XXXVII in his place, but the Raiders had little success against a very strong Tampa Bay Buccaneers defense.

Robbins regained his starting position during the 2003 NFL season, but was released before the 2004 NFL season due to steroid use. Treu then became the 6th starting center in Raider history, starting all 16 games, but then started only 10 the following year, replaced by Jake Grove who handled the starting duties for the Raiders with 5–11 and 4–12 won-lost records. In his final year, 2006, he became the reserve center again after Grove replaced him. In November 2006, Treu suffered a ruptured quadriceps tendon against the San Diego Chargers and went on injured reserve. After a 10-season professional career, Treu retired in July 2007.
