= Richard Harvey (American football) =

American football player (born 1966)

No. 58, 52
- Position: Linebacker

Personal information
- Born: September 11, 1966 (age 60); Pascagoula, Mississippi, U.S.
- Listed height: 6 ft 1 in (1.85 m)
- Listed weight: 235 lb (107 kg)

Career information
- High school: Pascagoula
- College: Tulane
- NFL draft: 1989: 11th round, 305th overall pick

Career history
- Buffalo Bills (1989); New England Patriots (1990); Buffalo Bills (1992–1993); Denver Broncos (1994); New Orleans Saints (1995–1997); Oakland Raiders (1998–1999); San Diego Chargers (2000)

Career NFL statistics
- Tackles: 430
- Forced fumbles: 5
- Interceptions: 2
- Stats at Pro Football Reference

Richard Clemont Harvey (born September 11, 1966) is an American former professional football player who was a linebacker in the National Football League. He played college football for the Tulane Green Wave and was selected in the 11th round of the 1989 NFL draft by the Buffalo Bills.

== Playing career ==
=== NFL playing career ===
Harvey played for the New England Patriots (1990-1991), the Buffalo Bills (1992-1993), the Denver Broncos (1994), the New Orleans Saints (1995-1997), the Oakland Raiders (1998-1999), and the San Diego Chargers (2000). He played college football at Tulane University.
