= Marquis Walker =

American football player (born 1972)

No. 27, 38
- Position: Cornerback

Personal information
- Born: June 6, 1972 (age 54); St. Louis, Missouri, U.S.
- Listed height: 5 ft 10 in (1.78 m)
- Listed weight: 175 lb (79 kg)

Career information
- High school: Berkeley
- College: Southeast Missouri State
- NFL draft: 1996: undrafted

Career history
- St. Louis Rams (1996)*; Washington Redskins (1996); St. Louis Rams (1996–1997); Oakland Raiders (1998–1999); Detroit Lions (2000)
- * Offseason or practice squad member only

Career NFL statistics
- Tackles: 125
- Interceptions: 5
- Fumble recoveries: 4
- Stats at Pro Football Reference

Marquis Roshe Walker (born July 6, 1972) is a former an American football cornerback. He was signed as an undrafted free agent by the St. Louis Rams in 1996. He played college football at Southeast Missouri State University.

Walker also played for the Washington Redskins, Oakland Raiders and Detroit Lions. His brother is Darnell Walker.
