= Don Martin (American football) =

American football player and coach (born 1949)

No. 38, 47, 21
- Position: Safety

Personal information
- Born: September 17, 1949 (age 77); Carrollton, Missouri, U.S.
- Listed height: 5 ft 11 in (1.80 m)
- Listed weight: 187 lb (85 kg)

Career information
- College: Yale
- NFL draft: 1971: 7th round, 157th overall pick

Career history
- Oakland Raiders (1971)*; Bridgeport Jets (1971); New York Jets (1972)*; New England Patriots (1973); Kansas City Chiefs (1975); Tampa Bay Buccaneers (1976)
- * Offseason or practice squad member only
- Stats at Pro Football Reference

Donald Joe Martin (born September 17, 1949) is an American former professional football player who played defensive back for three seasons for the New England Patriots, Tampa Bay Buccaneers, and Kansas City Chiefs.

From 1998 to 2003, he was defensive quality control coach for the Oakland Raiders.
