= Jermaine Williams (American football) =

American football player (born 1973)

No. 34, 43
- Position: Running back

Personal information
- Born: August 14, 1973 (age 53); Greenville, North Carolina, U.S.
- Listed height: 5 ft 11 in (1.80 m)
- Listed weight: 245 lb (111 kg)

Career information
- High school: J.H. Rose (Greenville)
- College: Houston
- NFL draft: 1997: undrafted

Career history
- Tampa Bay Buccaneers (1997) (Note: Williams was originally signed as an undrafted free agent by the Tampa Bay Buccaneers, but he did not make the roster.); Oakland Raiders (1998–1999); Jacksonville Jaguars (2000); Kansas City Chiefs (2001); Oakland Raiders (2001)
- Stats at Pro Football Reference

Jermaine Mequell Williams (born August 14, 1973) is an American former professional football player who was a running back in the National Football League (NFL). He played college football for the Houston Cougars. He was signed as an undrafted free agent by the Tampa Bay Buccaneers. While in the NFL, he played for the Oakland Raiders, Jacksonville Jaguars, and Kansas City Chiefs. He played four seasons in his career.

== Personal life ==
Jermaine is married to Kimberly Williams. They have three children including NFL running back, Josh Williams.
