= Darryl Ashmore =

American football player (born 1969)

No. 77, 73
- Position: Offensive tackle

Personal information
- Born: November 1, 1969 (age 57); Peoria, Illinois, U.S.
- Listed height: 6 ft 7 in (2.01 m)
- Listed weight: 325 lb (147 kg)

Career information
- High school: Peoria
- College: Northwestern
- NFL draft: 1992: 7th round, 171st overall pick

Career history
- Los Angeles/St. Louis Rams (1992–1996); Washington Redskins (1996–1997); Oakland Raiders (1998–2002)

Career NFL statistics
- Games played: 119
- Games started: 34
- Fumble recoveries: 1
- Stats at Pro Football Reference

Darryl Allan Ashmore (born November 1, 1969) is an American former professional football player who was an offensive lineman in the National Football League (NFL) for the Los Angeles/St. Louis Rams, Oakland Raiders and Washington Redskins. He was selected by the Rams in the seventh round of the 1992 NFL draft. He played college football for the Northwestern Wildcats. The young tackle shared playing time for his first two years and eventually replaced the NFL Hall Of Famer Jackie Slater with the St. Louis Rams in 1995. At Northwestern, he garnered All-Big Ten Honors after switching to the offensive side as a senior and made the Dean's List academically.
