= Willie Shaw =

American football player and coach (born 1944)

Personal information
- Born: January 11, 1944 (age 82); Glenmora, Louisiana, U.S.

Career information
- High school: San Diego (CA) Lincoln
- College: New Mexico (1966–1968)

Career history
- San Diego City (1970–1973) Assistant coach; San Diego HS (1973) Assistant head coach; Stanford (1974) Outside linebackers coach & special teams coordinator; Stanford (1975–1976) Defensive backs coach; Long Beach State (1977–1978) Defensive backs coach; Oregon (1979) Linebackers coach; Arizona State (1980–1984) Defensive backs coach; Detroit Lions (1985–1988) Defensive backs coach; Stanford (1989) Defensive backs coach; Stanford (1990–1991) Defensive coordinator; Minnesota Vikings (1992–1993) Defensive backs coach; San Diego Chargers (1994) Defensive backs coach; St. Louis Rams (1995–1996) Defensive coordinator; New Orleans Saints (1997) Defensive backs coach; Oakland Raiders (1998–1999) Defensive coordinator; Kansas City Chiefs (2000) Assistant head coach & defensive backs coach; Minnesota Vikings (2001–2002) Assistant head coach & defensive backs coach
- Coaching profile at Pro Football Reference

Willie Lorenzo Shaw (born January 11, 1944) is an American former football player and coach who coached for a number of NFL and college football teams. He is the father of former Stanford head coach David Shaw.

== Early life and playing career ==
Born in Glenmora, Louisiana, Shaw served in the United States Air Force after graduating from Lincoln High School in San Diego. Serving in the Vietnam War, Shaw rose to the rank of sergeant. Shaw later worked on jets at an electronics company before enrolling at the University of New Mexico. From 1966 to 1968, Shaw lettered in football for the New Mexico Lobos and was an All-Western Athletic Conference cornerback and an All-America honorable mention cornerback. Shaw then transferred to San Diego State University, where he did not play football but earned his bachelor's degree in physical education in 1971 and later a master's degree in physical education in 1973.

== Coaching career ==
Following his playing career, Shaw began a long career as an assistant coach at a number of college and NFL teams, coaching defenses either as a secondary coach or defensive coordinator. Shaw coached for a total of 14 teams, with his longest NFL stints occurring with the Minnesota Vikings (two separate stints) and the Detroit Lions; collegiately, his longest tenures were at Stanford (two separate stints) and at Arizona State. In his second stint at Stanford, he was a finalist for the head coach position in 1992 that eventually went to Bill Walsh.

== Personal life ==
Shaw is the father of former Stanford head coach David Shaw and the brother of 1960s USC safety Nate Shaw.
