= Mo Collins (American football) =

American football player and executive (1976–2014)

No. 79
- Position: Offensive lineman

Personal information
- Born: September 22, 1976; Charlotte, North Carolina, U.S.
- Died: October 26, 2014 (aged 38); Charlotte, North Carolina, U.S.
- Listed height: 6 ft 4 in (1.93 m)
- Listed weight: 325 lb (147 kg)

Career information
- High school: West Charlotte (NC)
- College: Florida
- NFL draft: 1998: 1st round, 23rd overall pick

Career history

Playing
- Oakland Raiders (1998–2003)

Operations
- Charlotte Speed (2013) (GM)

Awards and highlights
- 2× SEC Championship (1995, 1996); Bowl Alliance national champion (1996)

Career NFL statistics
- Games played: 71
- Games started: 64
- Stats at Pro Football Reference

Damon Jamal "Mo" Collins (September 22, 1976 – October 26, 2014), was an American professional football player who was an offensive lineman in the National Football League (NFL) for six seasons during the 1990s and early 2000s. Collins played college football for the University of Florida, and was a member of a national championship team. The Oakland Raiders selected him in the first round of the 1998 NFL draft, and he played his entire professional career for the Raiders.

== Early life ==
Collins was born in Charlotte, North Carolina in 1976. He attended West Charlotte High School in Charlotte, and he played high school football for the West Charlotte Lions. Collins was a key member of the Lions' North Carolina 4A state championship team in 1993. The Charlotte Observer ranked him as one of the top five high school football players in the state of North Carolina in 1993.

== College career ==
Collins accepted an athletic scholarship to attend the University of Florida in Gainesville, Florida, where he played for coach Steve Spurrier's Florida Gators football team from 1995 to 1997. As a true freshman in 1994, Collins suffered a foot injury and was redshirted by the Gators coaching staff, but became a full-time starter the following season. Collins was a member of the 1995 Gators team that went 12–0 in the regular season and played the Nebraska Cornhuskers for the Bowl Alliance national title in the Fiesta Bowl, and the 1996 Gators team that defeated the Florida State Seminoles 52–20 to win the Bowl Alliance national championship in the Sugar Bowl. After his junior year in 1997, Collins decided to forgo his final year of NCAA eligibility and enter the NFL draft.

Collins graduated from the University of Florida with a bachelor's degree in exercise and sport sciences in 1998.

== Professional career ==
The Oakland Raiders selected Collins in the first round (twenty-third pick overall) of the 1998 NFL draft. He played for the Raiders from 1998 to 2003. In his six NFL seasons, Collins appeared in seventy-one regular season games and started in sixty-four of them.

== Life after the NFL ==
Collins was hired as the head coach of the West Charlotte Lions football team of West Charlotte High School, his alma mater, on February 7, 2014. Collins died Sunday, October 26, 2014; he had been receiving dialysis treatment after suffering kidney failure.

== See also ==
- History of the Oakland Raiders
- List of Florida Gators in the NFL draft
- List of University of Florida alumni
