= Garrett Giemont =

Strength and conditioning coach

Pittsburgh Steelers
- Title: Conditioning coordinator

Personal information
- Born: August 31, 1957 (age 69)

Career information
- College: Fullerton College

Career history
- Los Angeles Rams (1970–1977) Training assistant; Los Angeles Rams (1978–1982) Assistant trainer; Los Angeles Rams (1983–1989) Strength and conditioning trainer; Los Angeles Rams (1990–1991) Strength and conditioning coach; Chicago Cubs (1992–1994) Director of physical development; Oakland Raiders (1995–2001) Strength and conditioning coach; Oakland Raiders (2002) Strength and conditioning coordinator; Tampa Bay Buccaneers (2004–2006) Strength and conditioning coach; Pittsburgh Steelers (2007–present) Conditioning coordinator

Awards and highlights
- Super Bowl champion (XLIII); Super Bowl Achievement Award (2008); NFL Strength Coach of the Year Award (2002)

Garrett Matthew Giemont (born August 31, 1957) is an American strength and conditioning coach who has worked for 30 years at the professional level with several teams in the National Football League (NFL) as well as in Major League Baseball (MLB).

== Early life ==
Giemont grew up in southern California where he got into the NFL on the ground floor at age 12 as a ball boy for the Los Angeles Rams. He played football in high school, but any thought of a playing career was ended by knee injuries. He attended Fullerton College where he earned a degree in physical education.

== Coaching career ==
Giemont began his career as a training assistant with the Rams in 1970. He worked his way up the Rams organization, eventually becoming the team's strength and conditioning coach in 1990.

Giemont left the Rams in 1992 to become the director of physical development for Major League Baseball's Chicago Cubs. With the Cubs he helped develop such players as Greg Maddux and Sammy Sosa.

Giemont returned to the NFL in 1995, taking a job as the strength coach of the Oakland Raiders. He remained with the Raiders under four head coaches through the 2002 season. In 2002, Giemont was named Coach of the Year by the Professional Football Strength and Conditioning Coaches Society.

In 2003 Giemont was hired as strength coach of the Tampa Bay Buccaneers, rejoining head coach Jon Gruden, under whom Giemont had coached in Oakland. The Buccaneers let Giemont go in 2006.

Mike Tomlin brought Giemont in as the strength and conditioning coordinator for the Pittsburgh Steelers in 2007 shortly after taking over for Bill Cowher as head coach. Tomlin had previously worked with Giemont on the Buccaneers coaching staff. When the Steelers won the Super Bowl in 2008, Giemont received the 2008 Strength and Conditioning Coach of the Year Super Bowl Achievement Award from the Professional Football Strength and Conditioning Coaches Society.

== Personal life ==
Giemont and his wife, Sonya, have two sons — Jackson and Jett.
