= Jeremy Brigham =

American football player and coach (born 1975)

No. 87, 49
- Position: Tight end

Personal information
- Born: March 22, 1975 (age 51); Boston, Massachusetts, U.S.
- Listed height: 6 ft 6 in (1.98 m)
- Listed weight: 255 lb (116 kg)

Career information
- High school: Saguaro (Scottsdale, Arizona)
- College: Washington
- NFL draft: 1998: 5th round, 127th overall pick

Career history

Playing
- Oakland Raiders (1998–2001)

Coaching
- Chabot College (2009–2010) Wide receiver coach; Chabot College (2010–2011) Offensive line coach; Chabot College (2012) Wide receiver coach; Scottsdale Community College (2012–2013) Offensive line coach; North Pointe Prep High School (2013–2014) Head coach/offensive coordinator; Apache Junction High School (2014–2015) Wide receiver coach/specialist punt coach; Apache Junction High School (2015–2016) Offensive coordinator; Rivoli Blackbills (2017–present) Head coach

Awards and highlights
- As player: Pac-10 co-champion (1995); As coach: Silver Bowl XXIV champion

Career NFL statistics
- Receptions: 33
- Receiving yards: 300
- Touchdowns: 3
- Stats at Pro Football Reference

Jeremy Paul Brigham is an American football coach and former tight end of four seasons for the Oakland Raiders. Currently Brigham is head coach of the Giaguari Torino out of Italy.

== Playing career ==
=== Washington Huskies ===
Brigham played college football for the Washington Huskies from 1993 to 1998 during his five-year collegiate career. Brigham was featured in Sports Illustrated as part of the #1 ranked Tight End Program in the US in the 1990s. Brigham was part of the 1995 Pac-10 co-champion team and part of the successful Husky teams that won the 1997 Aloha Bowl in Honolulu Hawaii and participated in the 1996 Plymouth Holiday Bowl in San Diego, California and the Sun Bowl in El Paso Texas in 1995.

=== Oakland Raiders ===
Brigham was drafted 127th overall in the 1998 NFL draft by the Oakland Raiders. He played five seasons with the team (1998–2002), including an appearance in Super Bowl XXXVII. Brigham scored two touchdowns in one game versus the Carolina Panthers on December 24, 2000, and Brigham was part of three Raider AFC West Division Championship teams.

== Coaching career ==
=== Earlier Positions ===
Brigham was a Wide Receiver and offensive line coach from 2009 to 2012 at Chabot College. He then became the offensive line coach at Scottsdale Community College for a season (2012–2013) before moving on to North Pointe Prep High School for two seasons (2013–2014) as head coach/offensive coordinator. Later that year, he joined Apache Junction High School, first as a wide receiver/specialist punt coach, and then as offensive coordinator the next season (2014–2016).

=== Rivoli Blackbills ===
In May 2017, Brigham was announced as the new head coach of Rivoli, Italy based team Rivoli Blackbills of FIDAF Division 2. He led his team to an undefeated season by defeating the previously undefeated Reggio Emilia Hogs in Silver Bowl XXIV 35–29. With the win, the Blackbills were promoted and will play in FIDAF Division 1, Italy's top level of American football, for the 2018 season.
