= Mike Waufle =

American football coach (born 1954)

Profile
- Position: Defensive line coach

Personal information
- Born: June 27, 1954 (age 72); Hornell, New York, U.S.

Career information
- College: Utah State

Career history
- Alfred University (1979) Defensive line coach; Utah State (1980) Asst Defensive backs coach; Utah State (1981–1982) Asst Offensive line coach; Utah State (1983–1984) Defensive line coach; Fresno State (1985–1988) Defensive line coach; UCLA (1989) Defensive line coach; Oregon State (1990–1991) Defensive line coach; California (1992–1997) Defensive line coach; Oakland Raiders (1998–2003) Defensive line coach; New York Giants (2004–2009) Defensive line coach; Oakland Raiders (2010–2011) Defensive line coach; St. Louis / Los Angeles Rams (2012–2016) Defensive line coach; Buffalo Bills (2017) Defensive line coach

Awards and highlights
- Super Bowl champion (XLII)

Mike Waufle (born June 27, 1954) is an American former football coach who most recently served as the defensive line coach for the Buffalo Bills of the National Football League (NFL). Waufle served as defensive line coach for the Oakland Raiders from 1998 to 2003 and coached in Super Bowl XXXVII after the 2002 season. Waufle coached primarily single gap 4 man defensive lines in a 4–3 defense. He was the defensive line coach for the New York Giants from 2004 to 2009, and the defensive lines he coached were a strength of the team. He won Super Bowl XLII in 2007; in that game the defensive line's performance is generally credited with being a decisive factor. The defensive line of the Giants during the Super Bowl sacked Tom Brady 5 times, leaving little time for Patriots receivers to get downfield before defensive linemen reached Brady. Holding the Patriots historically high scoring offense to 14 points the Giants defeated the previous undefeated New England Patriots. He returned to the Raiders in 2010 and 2011. From 2012 to 2016, he was the defensive line coach for the St. Louis / Los Angeles Rams under head coach Jeff Fisher. He coached the Buffalo Bills defensive line in 2017. Buffalo returned to the playoffs after 17 years. Waufle retired after the 2017 season.

== Early life ==
Waufle served in the United States Marines from 1972 to 1975. He played defensive end for Bakersfield College in 1975 and 1976. Bakersfield College won the 1976 Junior Rose Bowl and was named Junior College National Champions. He transferred to Utah State, where he played for defensive line coach Rod Marinelli. Utah State won the PCAA Conference Championship in 1978.

In 2009 he was awarded the Marine Corps “Lifetime Achievement Award” by Commandant General James T. Conway.
