= Barry Sims =

American football player (born 1974)

No. 65
- Position: Offensive tackle

Personal information
- Born: December 1, 1974 (age 51); Wheat Ridge, Colorado, U.S.
- Listed height: 6 ft 5 in (1.96 m)
- Listed weight: 300 lb (136 kg)

Career information
- High school: Park City (Park City, Utah)
- College: Utah
- NFL draft: 1999: undrafted

Career history
- Scottish Claymores (1999); Oakland Raiders (1999–2007); San Francisco 49ers (2008–2010)

Awards and highlights
- 2005 Commitment to Excellence (exemplifies Pride and Spirit of Oakland Raiders)

Career NFL statistics
- Games played: 174
- Games started: 141
- Stats at Pro Football Reference

Barry Sims (born December 1, 1974) is an American former professional football player who was an offensive tackle in the National Football League (NFL). He played college football for the Utah Utes and was selected by the Scottish Claymores in the 17th round of the NFL Europe Draft in 1999. Sims played nine seasons in the NFL with the Oakland Raiders and three seasons with the San Francisco 49ers.

== Early life ==
Sims lettered in football, basketball and track at Park City High School (Utah). He was all-League as a two-way lineman. In basketball, Sims played forward and center as well as participated in track as a shot putter, high jumper, and long jumper. On October 15, 2009, Sims' #72 Park City Miners football jersey was the first ever to be retired at that school.

== College career ==
Sims played two years at the University of Utah after transferring there from Dixie Junior College where he was named "Most Improved Player." He earned a BS in sociology from the University of Utah and finished with All-WAC honors.

== Professional career ==
Sims has, as of 2010, played in 152 NFL games with 133 starts, seven playoff starts, two Conference Championships and one Super Bowl appearance.

=== Scottish Claymores ===
Sims was drafted in the 17th round of the NFL European League draft by the Scottish Claymores. He played there in the spring of 1999. Sims was inducted into the Scottish Claymores Hall of Fame in 2004.

=== Oakland Raiders ===
The Oakland Raiders picked Sims up as a free agent during training camp in 1999. He broke into the starting lineup at left tackle in his fifth game facing off against All-Pro Bruce Smith. He started the entire 2004 season at left tackle and was co-recipient of the 2004 Commitment to Excellence Award which exemplifies the Pride and Spirit of the Oakland Raiders. During the 2005 season, Sims was the only member of the offensive line to play every snap from scrimmage through 16 league games. During the 2006 season, Sims moved inside to left guard. He was injured during his seventh game and sidelined for the rest of the season, thereby snapping a 67-game consecutive start streak. During the 2007 season, Sims competed with top draft pick Robert Gallery to regain his position as the starter at left tackle. He was also named a team captain during that season as the longest tenured starter on the team. On February 29, 2008, Sims was subsequently released by the Raiders to meet upcoming salary cap requirements.

=== San Francisco 49ers ===
Sims was signed by the San Francisco 49ers on June 23, 2008, primarily as a veteran back-up tackle. However, Sims has been called on to start at both left and right tackle positions, with eight starts at left tackle during the 2009 season, ably filling in for regular starter Joe Staley. Following the 2010 season, Sims was not re-signed by the 49ers.

== Personal life ==
Barry is an avid golfer who also enjoys hiking, cycling, and skiing. Sims lives with his wife Shae in Park City, Utah. They are very active in a variety of charitable activities, including Foster a Dream, which supports Northern California foster youth and Special Olympics of Northern California.
