= Calvin Branch =

American football player (born 1974)

No. 27, 40, 37
- Positions: Cornerback, safety

Personal information
- Born: May 8, 1974 (age 52); Versailles, Kentucky, U.S.
- Listed height: 5 ft 11 in (1.80 m)
- Listed weight: 195 lb (88 kg)

Career information
- High school: Spring (TX) Klein
- College: Colorado State
- NFL draft: 1997: 6th round, 172nd overall pick

Career history
- Oakland Raiders (1997–2000); → Barcelona Dragons (1999); Berlin Thunder (2002); Oakland Raiders (2005)

Career NFL statistics
- Tackles: 45
- Fumble recoveries: 2
- Stats at Pro Football Reference

Calvin Stanley Branch (born May 8, 1974) is an American former professional football player who was a cornerback in the National Football League (NFL). He played college football for the Colorado State Rams and was selected in the sixth round of the 1997 NFL draft. He played for five seasons for the Oakland Raiders. He works as a scout for the Raiders.

Pre-draft measurables
Height	Weight	Arm length	Hand span	40-yard dash	10-yard split	20-yard split	20-yard shuttle	Vertical jump	Broad jump	Bench press
5 ft 11 3/8 in (1.81 m)	200 lb (91 kg)	33 in (0.84 m)	9 5/8 in (0.24 m)	4.49 s	1.61 s	2.62 s	4.08 s	39.0 in (0.99 m)	10 ft 7 in (3.23 m)	18 reps
