= Kenny Shedd =

American football player (born 1971)

No. 81, 84, 19
- Position: Wide receiver

Personal information
- Born: February 14, 1971 (age 55); Davenport, Iowa, U.S.
- Listed height: 5 ft 10 in (1.78 m)
- Listed weight: 165 lb (75 kg)

Career information
- High school: West (Davenport)
- College: Northern Iowa
- NFL draft: 1993: 5th round, 129th overall pick

Career history
- New York Jets (1993-1994); Chicago Bears (1994); Barcelona Dragons (1996); Oakland Raiders (1996–1999); Washington Redskins (2000)

Career NFL statistics
- Receptions: 16
- Receiving yards: 252
- Receiving touchdowns: 1
- Stats at Pro Football Reference

Kendrick Dwayne Shedd (born February 14, 1971) is an American former professional football player who was a wide receiver in the National Football League (NFL)for the New York Jets, Chicago Bears, Oakland Raiders and Washington Redskins. He was selected 129th overall in the fifth round of the 1993 NFL draft by the Jets. He also played a season in 1996 on the Barcelona Dragons in the World League of American Football. He played college football for the Northern Iowa Panthers. In 2009, he was named in a tribute for alumni from the Missouri Valley Football Conference who have played in the NFL, as part of the “All-Select NFL Team."

Shedd graduated from the Police Academy in 2002 and currently works in law enforcement in San Leandro, California. He is also related to Picasso Nelson.
