= 2001 Oakland Raiders season =

NFL team season

- Owner: Al Davis
- General manager: Al Davis
- Head coach: Jon Gruden
- Offensive coordinator: Bill Callahan
- Defensive coordinator: Chuck Bresnahan
- Home stadium: Network Associates Coliseum

Results
- Record: 10–6
- Division place: 1st AFC West
- Playoffs: Won Wild Card Playoffs (vs. Jets) 38–24; Lost Divisional Playoffs (at Patriots) 13–16 (OT)
- Pro Bowlers: Rich Gannon, QB; Tim Brown, WR; Lincoln Kennedy, OT; Charles Woodson, CB; Shane Lechler, P

The 2001 Oakland Raiders season was the franchise's 32nd season in the National Football League (NFL), the 42nd overall, their seventh season since their move back to Oakland, and the fourth year under head coach Jon Gruden, the last of his first stint as the team's head coach.

In the offseason, the Raiders acquired wide receiver Jerry Rice through free agency. Rice excelled with his new team, catching 83 passes for 1,139 yards and 9 touchdowns. The Raiders finished the season 10–6, finishing in first place in the AFC West for the second consecutive year. Their six regular season losses were by a combined 24 points.

The Raiders qualified for the postseason, beating the New York Jets in the wild-card round, who were also the team the Raiders lost to in the final game of the regular season. In the Divisional round, the Raiders blew a 13–3 lead and lost to the eventual Super Bowl champion New England Patriots 16–13 in overtime in a controversial finish. With a minute and 43 seconds remaining in the fourth quarter and the Raiders leading 13–10, cornerback Charles Woodson appeared to force a fumble of Patriots' quarterback Tom Brady that was recovered by the Raiders. The play was reviewed by instant replay and the fumble was ruled an incomplete pass. The Patriots tied the game in the ensuing drive and then won in overtime. The game became known as the Tuck Rule Game. After which Referee Walt Coleman would never officiate an Oakland Raiders game for the rest of his career being blacklisted by the league.

It would be Jon Gruden's final season as head coach in his first stint with the Raiders. After the season he was traded to the Tampa Bay Buccaneers in exchange for Tampa Bay's first-round draft picks in 2002 and 2003, their second-round draft picks in 2004 and 2005, and $8 million in cash. The Raiders faced Gruden and the Tampa Bay Buccaneers in the Super Bowl the next year, and lost 48–21. Gruden would return to the Raiders as head coach 16 years later in 2018. After the season, Elijah Alexander, future Hall of Famer Eric Allen, and Steve Wisniewski decided they had played their final NFL games.

The Raiders' theme song was Veridis Quo by Daft Punk.

== Offseason ==
Additions	Subtractions
WR Jerry Rice (49ers)	DE Lance Johnstone (Vikings)
RB Charlie Garner (49ers)	CB Darrien Gordon (Falcons)
DE Trace Armstrong (Dolphins)	TE Rickey Dudley (Browns)
TE Roland Williams (Rams)	
WR Reggie Barlow (Jaguars)	

=== NFL draft ===
2001 Oakland Raiders draft
Round	Pick	Player	Position	College	Notes
1	28	Derrick Gibson	Safety	Florida State	
2	59	Marques Tuiasosopo	Quarterback	Washington	
3	89	DeLawrence Grant	Linebacker	Oregon State	
5	158	Ray Perryman	Safety	Northern Arizona	
5	168	Chris Cooper	Defensive tackle	Nebraska–Omaha	
7	228	Derek Combs	Cornerback	Ohio State	
7	229	Ken-Yon Rambo	Wide receiver	Ohio State	
Made roster

== Staff / Coaches ==
2001 Oakland Raiders Staff
Front office: Principal Owner / President of the General Partner – Al Davis; Senior Executive – John Herrera; Head coaches: Head coach – Jon Gruden; Coaches’ Assistant – Paul Kelly; Offensive coaches: Offensive coordinator/offensive line – Bill Callahan; Quarterbacks – David Shaw; Running backs – Skip Peete; Wide receivers – Fred Biletnikoff; Wide receivers – John Morton; Tight ends – Jim Erkenbeck; Assistant offensive line – Aaron Kromer; Senior assistant-offense – Marc Trestman	Defensive coaches: Defensive coordinator – Chuck Bresnahan; Defensive line – Mike Waufle; Linebackers – Fred Pagac; Defensive backs – Ron Lynn; Assistant defensive backs/director of squad development – Willie Brown; Defensive quality control – Don Martin; Special teams coaches: Special teams – Bob Casullo; Strength and conditioning: Strength and conditioning – Garrett Giemont

== Final roster ==
2001 Oakland Raiders final roster
Quarterbacks: 12 Rich Gannon; 16 Rodney Peete; 8 Marques Tuiasosopo; Running backs: 32 Zack Crockett FB; 25 Charlie Garner; 28 Randy Jordan; 42 Terry Kirby; 40 Jon Ritchie FB; 47 Tyrone Wheatley; 34 Jermaine Williams; Wide receivers: 81 Tim Brown; 82 James Jett; 83 Marcus Knight; 84 Jerry Porter; 80 Jerry Rice; Tight ends: 87 Jeremy Brigham; 89 Mondriel Fulcher; 86 Roland Williams	Offensive linemen: 77 Darryl Ashmore G; 79 Mo Collins G; 68 Aaron Graham C; 72 Lincoln Kennedy T; 73 Frank Middleton G; 70 Toby Myles T; 65 Barry Sims T; 74 Matt Stinchcomb T; 62 Adam Treu C; 76 Steve Wisniewski G; Defensive linemen: 94 Tony Bryant DE; 57 Rod Coleman DT; 75 Chris Cooper DE; 95 DeLawrence Grant DE; 92 Junior Ioane DT; 90 Grady Jackson DT; 99 Josh Taves DT; 91 Regan Upshaw DE	Linebackers: 58 Elijah Alexander OLB; 50 Eric Barton OLB; 54 Greg Biekert MLB; 55 Bobby Brooks MLB; 53 Travian Smith OLB; 59 William Thomas OLB; Defensive backs: 21 Eric Allen CB; 33 Anthony Dorsett FS; 26 Derrick Gibson FS; 37 Johnnie Harris SS; 20 Tory James CB; 39 Brandon Jennings CB; 23 Marquez Pope SS; 24 Charles Woodson CB; Special teams: 3 Brad Daluiso K; 11 Sebastian Janikowski K; 9 Shane Lechler P	Reserve lists: 93 Trace Armstrong DE (IR); 85 Reggie Barlow WR (IR); 14 Bobby Hoying QB (IR); 41 Eric Johnson S (IR); 63 Barret Robbins C (IR); 96 Darrell Russell DT (Susp.); Practice squad: 5 Derek Combs CB; 44 Ray Perryman S; 78 Chad Slaughter T; 19 Elijah Thurmon WR; 18 Marcus Williams TE; rookies in italics 53 active, 6 inactive, 5 practice squad

== Preseason ==
Week	Date	Opponent	Result	Record	Venue
1	August 4	Dallas Cowboys	W 21–14	1–0	Network Associates Coliseum
2	August 11	at Arizona Cardinals	W 10–7	2–0	Sun Devil Stadium
3	August 19	at San Francisco 49ers	L 17–20	2–1	3Com Park
4	August 27	vs. Dallas Cowboys	L 6–21	2–2	Estadio Azteca (Mexico City)
5	August 31	Green Bay Packers	W 24–13	3–2	Network Associates Coliseum

== Regular season ==
=== Schedule ===
Week	Date	Opponent	Result	Record	Venue	Attendance
1	September 9	at Kansas City Chiefs	W 27–24	1–0	Arrowhead Stadium	78,844
2 (Note: The Raiders were originally scheduled to host the New York Jets during Week 2 of the original NFL schedule (September 16) at Network Associates Coliseum. However, due to the September 11 attacks, the game was rescheduled to Week 17.)	September 23	at Miami Dolphins	L 15–18	1–1	Pro Player Stadium	73,304
3	September 30	Seattle Seahawks	W 38–14	2–1	Network Associates Coliseum	54,629
4 (Note: The Raiders were originally scheduled to host the Dallas Cowboys during Week 6 (October 21) at Network Associates Coliseum. However, the game was rescheduled to Week 4 to accommodate a possible Oakland Athletics baseball game in the ALCS, in which both the Cowboys and Raiders would originally have had their byes. The Athletics were subsequently eliminated on October 15.)	October 7	Dallas Cowboys	W 28–21	3–1	Network Associates Coliseum	61,535
5	October 14	at Indianapolis Colts	W 23–18	4–1	RCA Dome	56,972
6	Bye					
7	October 28	at Philadelphia Eagles	W 20–10	5–1	Veterans Stadium	65,342
8	November 5	Denver Broncos	W 38–28	6–1	Network Associates Coliseum	62,637
9	November 11	at Seattle Seahawks	L 27–34	6–2	Husky Stadium	67,231
10	November 18	San Diego Chargers	W 34–24	7–2	Network Associates Coliseum	61,960
11	November 25	at New York Giants	W 28–10	8–2	Giants Stadium	78,756
12	December 2	Arizona Cardinals	L 31–34 (OT)	8–3	Network Associates Coliseum	46,601
13	December 9	Kansas City Chiefs	W 28–26	9–3	Network Associates Coliseum	60,784
14	December 15	at San Diego Chargers	W 13–6	10–3	Qualcomm Stadium	67,349
15	December 22	Tennessee Titans	L 10–13	10–4	Network Associates Coliseum	61,934
16	December 30	at Denver Broncos	L 17–23	10–5	Invesco Field at Mile High	75,582
17	January 6	New York Jets	L 22–24	10–6	Network Associates Coliseum	62,011

== Standings ==
AFC West
	W	L	T	PCT	PF	PA	STK
^{(3)} Oakland Raiders	10	6	0	.625	399	327	L3
Seattle Seahawks	9	7	0	.563	301	324	W2
Denver Broncos	8	8	0	.500	340	339	L1
Kansas City Chiefs	6	10	0	.375	320	344	L1
San Diego Chargers	5	11	0	.313	332	321	L9

== Playoffs ==
=== AFC Wild Card Playoff ===
Oakland Raiders 38, New York Jets 24

Quarter	1	2	3	4	Total
Jets	0	3	7	14	24
Raiders	6	10	0	22	38

at Network Associates Coliseum, Oakland, California

- Date: January 12, 2002
- Game time: 8:00 p.m. EST/5:00 p.m. PST
- Game weather: 53 °F (12 °C), clear
- Game attendance: 61,503
- Referee: Dick Hantak
- TV announcers (ABC): Al Michaels (play-by-play), Dan Fouts, Dennis Miller (color commentators), Melissa Stark, and Eric Dickerson (sideline reporters)

Raiders go to the Tuck Rule but lost to the Patriots 16-13 in overtime.

=== AFC Divisional Playoff ===
New England Patriots 16, Oakland Raiders 13 (OT)

Quarter	1	2	3	4	OT	Total
Raiders	0	7	6	0	0	13
Patriots	0	0	3	10	3	16

at Foxboro Stadium, Foxborough, Massachusetts

- Date: January 19, 2002
- Game time: 8:00 p.m. EST
- Game weather: 19 °F (−7 °C), heavy snow
- Game attendance: 60,292
- Referee: Walt Coleman
- TV announcers (CBS): Greg Gumbel (play-by-play), Phil Simms (color commentator), and Armen Keteyian (sideline reporter)
