= 2000 Oakland Raiders season =

NFL team season

- Owner: Al Davis
- General manager: Al Davis
- Head coach: Jon Gruden
- Offensive coordinator: Bill Callahan
- Defensive coordinator: Chuck Bresnahan
- Home stadium: Network Associates Coliseum

Results
- Record: 12–4
- Division place: 1st AFC West
- Playoffs: Won Divisional Playoffs (vs. Dolphins) 27–0; Lost AFC Championship (vs. Ravens) 3–16
- Pro Bowlers: Rich Gannon, QB; Lincoln Kennedy, OT; Steve Wisniewski, G Charles Woodson, CB

The 2000 Oakland Raiders season was the franchise's 31st season in the National Football League (NFL), the 41st overall, their sixth season of their second stint in Oakland, and the third season under head coach Jon Gruden. The Raiders finished the season 12–4 (the best record in the Gruden era), winning the AFC West and advancing to the AFC Championship Game for the first time since 1990. They returned to the playoffs for the first time since 1993, when the team was still in Los Angeles. The Divisional Round playoff game versus the Miami Dolphins would be their first home playoff game in Oakland since defeating the Houston Oilers in the 1980 AFC Wild Card Playoffs.

This was the first of three consecutive AFC West titles for the Raiders. As the No. 2 seed in the AFC, the Raiders received a bye into the divisional round of the playoffs. Their four regular season losses were by a combined 16 points. The Raiders held the Miami Dolphins scoreless, winning 27–0. The following week against the eventual Super Bowl champion Baltimore Ravens in the AFC Championship, starting quarterback Rich Gannon sustained a shoulder injury after being hit by Baltimore's Tony Siragusa early in the second quarter. The loss of Gannon was too steep to overcome as the Raiders lost 16–3. Siragusa was later fined $10,000 for the hit. This was the NFL-record ninth playoff loss in Raiders history with a Super Bowl berth at stake (since tied by the San Francisco 49ers in 2013). The Raiders set a still-standing franchise record for most points scored in the regular season, with 479.

The season was also the first for kicker Sebastian Janikowski. He would play 276 games in the regular season and playoffs as a Raider, a franchise record.

== Offseason ==
Additions	Subtractions
FS Anthony Dorsett (Titans)	DT Russell Maryland (Packers)
WR Andre Rison (Chiefs)	LB Richard Harvey (Chargers)
LB Elijah Alexander (Colts)	K Michael Husted (Redskins)
LB William Thomas (Eagles)	P Leo Araguz (Rams)
SS Marquez Pope (Browns)	CB Marquis Walker (Lions)
RB Terry Kirby (Browns)	
DE Regan Upshaw (Jaguars)	
CB Tory James (Broncos)	

=== NFL draft ===
2000 Oakland Raiders draft
Round	Pick	Player	Position	College	Notes
1	17	Sebastian Janikowski *	K	Florida State	First pure placekicker drafted in 1st round since 1966
2	47	Jerry Porter	WR	West Virginia	
4	107	Junior Ioane	DT	Arizona State	
5	142	Shane Lechler *	P	Texas A&M	
7	227	Mondriel Fulcher	TE	Miami (FL)	
7	231	Clifton Black	CB	Texas State	
Made roster † Pro Football Hall of Fame * Made at least one Pro Bowl during career

=== Undrafted free agents ===
2000 undrafted free agents of note
Player	Position	College
Shomari Buchanan	Wide receiver	Alabama
Jeff Cronshagen	Tackle	Stanford
Joey Hamilton	Wide receiver	Jacksonville State
Jabari Jackson	Running back	USC
Julius Jackson	Linebacker	Nebraska
Brandon Jennings	Safety	Texas A&M
Eric Johnson	Safety	Nebraska
Marcus Knight	Wide receiver	Michigan
Abdul Salam Noah	Defensive tackle	San Jose State
Anthony White	Running back	Kentucky

== Staff ==
2000 Oakland Raiders Staff
Front office: Principal Owner / President of the General Partner – Al Davis; Senior Executive – John Herrera; Head coaches: Head coach – Jon Gruden; Coaches’ Assistant – Paul Kelly; Offensive coaches: Offensive coordinator/offensive line – Bill Callahan; Quarterbacks – Gary Stevens; Running backs – Skip Peete; Wide receivers – Fred Biletnikoff; Tight ends – Jim Erkenbeck; Offensive quality control – John Morton; Quality control – David Shaw	Defensive coaches: Defensive coordinator – Chuck Bresnahan; Defensive line – Mike Waufle; Linebackers – Robin Ross; Defensive backs – Ron Lynn; Assistant defensive backs/director of squad development – Willie Brown; Defensive assistant – Woodrow Lowe; Defensive quality control – Don Martin; Special teams coaches: Special teams – Bob Casullo; Strength and conditioning: Strength and conditioning – Garrett Giemont

== Roster ==
2000 Oakland Raiders roster
Quarterbacks (QB): 12 Rich Gannon; 14 Bobby Hoying; 16 Rodney Peete; Running backs (RB): 32 Zack Crockett FB; 28 Randy Jordan; 26 Napoleon Kaufman; 42 Terry Kirby; 40 Jon Ritchie FB; 47 Tyrone Wheatley; Wide receivers (WR): 81 Tim Brown; 88 David Dunn; 82 James Jett; 84 Jerry Porter; 80 Andre Rison; Tight ends (TE): 87 Jeremy Brigham; 83 Rickey Dudley; 89 Mondriel Fulcher	Offensive linemen (OL): 73 Darryl Ashmore G; 79 Mo Collins G; 72 Lincoln Kennedy T; 77 Toby Myles G; 71 Nathan Parks G; 63 Barret Robbins C; 65 Barry Sims G; 74 Matt Stinchcomb T; 62 Adam Treu C; 76 Steve Wisniewski G; Defensive linemen (DL): 94 Tony Bryant DE; 57 Rod Coleman DT; 92 Junior Ioane DT; 90 Grady Jackson DT; 51 Lance Johnstone DE; 96 Darrell Russell DT; 99 Josh Taves DE; 91 Regan Upshaw DE	Linebackers (LB): 58 Elijah Alexander OLB; 50 Eric Barton OLB; 54 Greg Biekert MLB; 55 Bobby Brooks MLB; 53 Travian Smith OLB; 59 William Thomas OLB; Defensive backs (DB): 21 Eric Allen CB; 27 Calvin Branch CB; 33 Anthony Dorsett FS; 23 Darrien Gordon CB; 37 Johnnie Harris SS; 20 Tory James CB; 39 Brandon Jennings CB; 41 Eric Johnson FS; 49 Marquez Pope SS; 24 Charles Woodson CB; Special teams (ST): 11 Sebastian Janikowski K; 9 Shane Lechler P	Practice squad: 86 Terrance Huston TE; 35 Jabari Jackson RB; 7 Marcus Knight WR; 19 Brock McGrew WR; Reserve: 10 Scott Dreisbach QB (IR); 85 Terry Mickens WR (IR); Rookies in italics 53 active, 2 reserve, 4 practice squad

Rookies in italics

== Regular season ==
=== Schedule ===
Week	Date	Opponent	Result	Record	Venue	Attendance
1	September 3	**San Diego Chargers**	**W** 9–6	1–0	Network Associates Coliseum	56,373
2	September 10	at Indianapolis Colts	**W** 38–31	2–0	RCA Dome	56,769
3	September 17	**Denver Broncos**	**L** 24–33	2–1	Network Associates Coliseum	62,078
4	September 24	Cleveland Browns	**W** 36–10	3–1	Cleveland Browns Stadium	45,702
5	Bye					
6	October 8	at San Francisco 49ers	**W** 34–28 (OT)	4–1	3Com Park	68,344
7	October 15	at **Kansas City Chiefs**	**W** 20–17	5–1	Arrowhead Stadium	79,025
8	October 22	**Seattle Seahawks**	**W** 31–3	6–1	Network Associates Coliseum	57,490
9	October 29	at **San Diego Chargers**	**W** 15–13	7–1	Qualcomm Stadium	66,659
10	November 5	**Kansas City Chiefs**	**W** 49–31	8–1	Network Associates Coliseum	62,428
11	November 13	at **Denver Broncos**	**L** 24–27	8–2	Invesco Field	75,951
12	November 19	at New Orleans Saints	**W** 31–22	9–2	Louisiana Superdome	64,900
13	November 26	Atlanta Falcons	**W** 41–14	10–2	Network Associates Coliseum	55,175
14	December 3	at Pittsburgh Steelers	**L** 20–21	10–3	Three Rivers Stadium	55,811
15	December 10	New York Jets	**W** 31–7	11–3	Network Associates Coliseum	62,632
16	December 16	at **Seattle Seahawks**	**L** 24–27	11–4	Husky Stadium	68,681
17	December 24	Carolina Panthers	**W** 52–9	12–4	Network Associates Coliseum	60,637
Note: Intra-division opponents are in **bold** text.

=== Season summary ===
==== Week 1: vs. San Diego Chargers ====
San Diego Chargers (0–0) at Oakland Raiders (0–0)

Quarter	1	2	3	4	Total
Chargers	0	0	0	6	**6**
**Raiders**	0	0	2	7	**9**

at Network Associates Coliseum, Oakland, California

- Date: September 3, 2000
- Game time: 4:15 p.m. EST
- Game weather: 64 °F (17.8 °C); wind 12 miles per hour (19 km/h; 10 kn)
- Game attendance: 56,373
- Referee: Ron Blum
- TV announcers: Gus Johnson, Brent Jones

Game information

**First quarter**

- No scoring plays

**Second quarter**

- No scoring plays

**Third quarter**

- OAK — Chancey tackled by Russell in end zone for safety. Raiders 2–0

**Fourth quarter**

- SDG — Chancey 3 yard run (kick failed). Chargers 6–2
- OAK — Rison 10 yard pass from Gannon (Janikowski kick). Raiders 9–6

**Top passers**

- SDG — Ryan Leaf, 17/39, 180 yards, 3 INT
- OAK — Rich Gannon, 20/35, 176 yards, TD

**Top rushers**

- SDG — Robert Chancey, 23 rushes, 74 yards, TD
- OAK – Tyrone Wheatley, 13 rushes, 47 yards

**Top receivers**

- SDG — Jeff Graham, 4 receptions, 62 yards
- OAK — Andre Rison, 5 receptions, 49 yards

==== Week 2: at Indianapolis Colts ====
Week 2: Oakland Raiders (1–0) at Indianapolis Colts (1–0)

Quarter	1	2	3	4	Total
**Raiders**	0	7	24	7	**38**
Colts	14	10	0	7	**31**

at RCA Dome

- Date: September 10, 2000
- Game time: 1:00 p.m. EST
- Game weather: Dome
- Game attendance: 56,769
- TV announcers (CBS): Greg Gumbel, Todd Blackledge, and Armen Keteyian

Game information

**First quarter**

- IND — Pollard 13-yard pass from Manning (Vanderjagt kick), 10:17. Colts 7–0
- IND — James 6-yard rush (Vanderjagt kick), 4:57. Colts 14–0

**Second quarter**

- IND — James 10-yard pass from Manning (Vanderjagt kick), 11:28. Colts 21–0
- OAK — Gannon 3-yard rush (Janikowski kick), 2:51. Colts 21–7
- IND — Mike Vanderjagt 31-yard field goal, 0:03. Colts 24–7

**Third quarter**

- OAK — Gannon 7-yard rush (Janikowski kick), 10:56. Colts 24–14
- OAK — Janikowski 24-yard field goal, 7:30. Colts 24–17
- OAK — Gannon 6-yard rush (Janikowski kick), 3:58. 24–24
- OAK — Wheatley 6-yard rush (Janikowski kick), 0:41. Raiders 31—24

**Fourth quarter**

- OAK — Wheatley 1-yard rush (Janikowski kick), 5:39. Raiders 38–24
- IND — Harrison 50-yard pass from Manning (Vanderjagt kick), 4:07. Raiders 38–31

**Top passers**

- OAK — Rich Gannon, 15/22, 207 yards
- IND — Peyton Manning, 33/48, 367 yards, 3 TD, 2 INT

**Top rushers**

- OAK — Napoleon Kaufman, 8 rushes, 66 yards
- IND — Edgerrin James, 18 rushes, 91 yards, TD

**Top receivers**

- OAK — Tim Brown, 8 receptions, 66 yards
- IND — Marvin Harrison, 10 receptions, 141 yards, TD

This was the first time the Raiders had ever visited Indianapolis. Their previous regular season away game against the Colts occurred as far back as 1975 in Baltimore, although they also played in Baltimore during the 1977 postseason. This anomaly was due to old NFL scheduling formulas in place prior to 2002, whereby teams had no rotating schedule opposing members of other divisions within their own conference, but instead played interdivisional conference games according to position within a season's table.

==== Week 3: vs. Denver Broncos ====
Week 3: Denver Broncos (1–1) at Oakland Raiders (2–0)

Quarter	1	2	3	4	Total
**Broncos**	17	7	3	6	**33**
Raiders	7	17	0	0	**24**

at Network Associates Coliseum, Oakland, California

- Date: September 17, 2000
- Game time: 4:05 p.m. EST
- Game weather: 79 °F (26.1 °C), relative humidity 55%, wind 9 miles per hour (14 km/h; 7.8 kn)
- Game attendance: 62,078
- Referee: Mike Carey

Game information

**First quarter**

- DEN — McCaffrey 10-yard pass from Griese (Nedney kick), 8:45. Broncos 7–0
- DEN — Pryce 28-yard defensive fumble return (Nedney kick), 8:26. Broncos 14–0
- DEN — Nedney 24-yard field goal, 6:24. Broncos 17–0
- OAK — Brown 11-yard pass from Gannon (Janikowski kick), 2:36. Broncos 17–7

**Second quarter**

- DEN — Griffith 1-yard pass from Griese (Nedney kick), 14:27. Broncos 24–7
- OAK — Janikowski 19-yard field goal, 10:25. Broncos 24–10
- OAK — Brown 9 yard pass from Gannon (Janikowski kick), 9:23. Broncos 24–17
- OAK — Randy Jordan 3 yard blocked punt return (Janikowski kick), 7:48. 24–24

**Third quarter**

- DEN — Nedney 32-yard field goal, 3:53. Broncos 27—24

**Fourth quarter**

- DEN — Nedney 22-yard field goal, 13:07. Broncos 30—24
- DEN — Nedney 21-yard field goal, 4:48. Broncos 33—24

**Top Passers**

- DEN — Brian Griese, 21/31, 213 yards, 2 TD
- OAK — Rich Gannon, 13/21, 159 yards, 2 TD, 2 INT

**Top rushers**

- DEN — Mike Anderson, 32 rushes, 187 yards
- OAK — Napoleon Kaufman, 5 rushes, 86 yards

**Top receivers**

- DEN — Ed McCaffrey, 7 receptions, 92 yards, TD
- OAK — Tim Brown, 7 receptions, 92 yards, 2 TD

==== Week 4: vs. Cleveland Browns ====
Week 4: Cleveland Browns (2–1) at Oakland Raiders (2–1)

Quarter	1	2	3	4	Total
Browns	7	0	3	0	**10**
**Raiders**	7	21	0	8	**36**

at Network Associates Coliseum, Oakland, California

- Date: September 24, 2000
- Game time: 4:17 p.m. EST
- Game weather: 76 °F (24.4 °C), relative humidity 35%, wind 5 miles per hour (8.0 km/h; 4.3 kn)
- Game attendance: 45,702
- Referee: Larry Nemmers

Game information

**First quarter**

- CLE — Chiaverini 15-yard pass from Couch (Dawson kick), 10:17. Browns 7—0
- OAK — Wheatley 2-yard rush (Janikowski kick),7:21. 7–7

**Second quarter**

- OAK — Wheatley 2-yard rush (Janikowski kick), 13:27. Raiders 14–7
- OAK — Crockett 2-yard rush (Janikowski kick), 1:17. Raiders 21–7
- OAK — Thomas 46-yard interception return (Janikowski kick), 0:42. Raiders 28–7

**Third quarter**

- CLE — Dawson 29-yard field goal, 2:49. Raiders 28–10

**Fourth quarter**

- OAK — Janikowski 37-yard field goal, 13:14. Raiders 31–10
- OAK — Janikowski 31-yard field goal, 5:51. Raiders 34–10
- OAK — Safety, Couch penalized for intentional grounding in end zone, 5:34. Raiders 36–10

**Top passers**

- CLE — Tim Couch, 16/29, 141 yards, TD, 2 INT
- OAK — Rich Gannon, 14/23, 179 yards

**Top rushers**

- CLE — Errict Rhett, 15 rushes, 85 yards
- OAK — Tyrone Wheatley, 21 rushed 63 yards, 2 TD

**Top receivers**

- CLE — Travis Prentice, 5 receptions, 45 yards
- OAK — Tim Brown, 3 receptions, 54 yards
- OAK — Andre Rison, 3 receptions, 54 yards

==== Week 6: at San Francisco 49ers ====
Week 6: Oakland Raiders (3–1) at San Francisco 49ers (2–3)

Quarter	1	2	3	4	OT	Total
**Raiders**	3	3	15	7	6	**34**
49ers	0	14	0	14	0	**28**

at 3Com Park, San Francisco, California

- Date: October 8, 2000
- Game time: 4:00 p.m. EST
- Game weather: 66 °F (18.9 °C), relative humidity 60%, wind 10 miles per hour (16 km/h; 8.7 kn)
- Game attendance: 68,344
- Referee: Ron Blum

Game information

**First quarter**

- OAK — Janikowski 23-yard field goal, 12:44. Raiders 3–0

**Second quarter**

- OAK — Janikowski 35-yard field goal, 11:41. Raiders 6–0
- SFO — Owens 4-yard pass from Garcia (Richey kick), 6:22. 49ers 7–6
- SFO — Rice 5-yard pass from Garcia (Richey kick), 0:19. 49ers 14–6

**Third quarter**

- OAK — Wheatley 1-yard rush (Gannon run), 9:58. 14–14
- OAK — Brown 30-yard pass from Gannon (Janikowski kick), 4:50. Raiders 21–14

**Fourth quarter**

- OAK — Gannon 13-yard rush (Janikowski kick), 14:48. Raiders 28–14
- SFO — Owens 31-yard pass from Garcia (Richey kick), 9:51. Raiders 28–21
- SFO — Garner 9-yard pass from Garcia (Richey kick), 8:38. 28–28

**Overtime**

- OAK — Brown 31-yard pass from Gannon, 4:45. Raiders 34–28

**Top passers**

- OAK — Rich Gannon, 21/43, 310 yards, 2 TD, INT
- SFO — Jeff Garcia, 28/41, 336 yards, 4 TD

**Top rushers**

- OAK – Rich Gannon 12 rushes, 85 yards, TD
- SFO — Charlie Garner, 24 rushes, 109 yards

**Top receivers**

- OAK — Tim Brown, 7 receptions, 172 yards, 2 TD
- SFO — Terrell Owens, 122 receptions, 176 yards, 2 TD

==== Week 7: at Kansas City Chiefs ====
Week 7: Oakland Raiders (4–1) at Kansas City Chiefs (3–2)

Quarter	1	2	3	4	Total
**Raiders**	7	0	3	10	**20**
Chiefs	0	17	0	0	**17**

at Arrowhead Stadium, Kansas City, Missouri

- Date: October 15, 2000
- Game time: 1:00 p.m. EST
- Game weather: 62 °F (16.7 °C), relative humidity 96%, wind 8 miles per hour (13 km/h; 7.0 kn)
- Game attendance: 79,025
- Referee: Tony Corrente

Game information

**First quarter**

- OAK — Kaufman 4-yard pass from Gannon (Janikowski kick), 5:09. Raiders 7–0

**Second quarter**

- KAN — Peterson 27-yard field goalm 6:38. Raiders 7–3
- KAN — Gonzalez 14-yard pass from Grbac (Peterson kick), 2:49. Chiefs 10–7
- KAN — Richardson 15-yard pass from Grbac (Peterson kick), 0:12. Chiefs 17–7

**Third quarter**

- OAK — Janikowski 47-yard field goal, 10:16. Chiefs 17–10

**Fourth quarter**

- OAK — Wheatley 7-yard pass from Gannon (Janikowski kick), 9:25. 17–17
- OAK — Janikowski 43-yard field goal, 0:25. Raiders 20–17

**Top passers**

- OAK — Rich Gannon, 28/33, 244 yards, 2 TD
- KAN — Elvis Grbac, 23/40, 288 yards, 2 TD

**Top rushers**

- OAK — Tyrone Wheatley, 15 rushes, 76 yards
- KAN — Tony Richardson, 5 rushes, 25 yards

**Top receivers**

- OAK — Tim Brown, 5 receptions, 89 yards
- KAN — Tony Gonzalez, 7 receptions, 100 yards, TD

==== Week 8: vs. Seattle Seahawks ====
Week 8: Seattle Seahawks (2–5) at Oakland Raiders (5–1)

Quarter	1	2	3	4	Total
Seahawks	3	0	0	0	**3**
**Raiders**	7	14	0	10	**31**

at Network Associates Coliseum, Oakland, California

- Date: October 22, 2000
- Game time: 4:05 p.m. EST
- Game weather: 66 °F (18.9 °C), wind 26 miles per hour (42 km/h; 23 kn)
- Game attendance: 57,490
- Referee: Bill Carollo
- TV announcers: Greg Gumbel, Phil Simms, and Armen Keteyian

Game information

**First quarter**

- SEA — Lindell 44-yard field goal. Seahawks 3–0
- OAK — Brown 16-yard pass from Gannon (Janikowski kick). Raiders 7–3

**Second quarter**

- OAK — Brown 9-yard pass from Gannon (Janikowski kick). Raiders 14–3
  OAK — Wheatley 80-yard rush (Janikowski kick). Raiders 21–3

**Third quarter**

- No scoring plays

**Fourth quarter**

- OAK — Janikowski 32-yard field goal. Raiders 24–3
- OAK — Jett 23-yard pass from Gannon (Janikowski kick) Raiders 31–3

**Top passers**

- SEA — Jon Kitna, 11/18, 85 yards
- OAK — Rich Gannon, 15/22, 176 yards, 3 TD, INT

**Top rushers**

- SEA — Ricky Watters, 17 rushes, 95 yards
- OAK — Tyrone Wheatley, 15 rushes, 156 yards, TD

**Top receivers**

- SEA — Ricky Watters 2 receptions, 56 yards
- OAK — Randy Jordan, 2 receptions, 35 yards

==== Week 9: at San Diego Chargers ====
Week 9: Oakland Raiders (6–1) at San Diego Chargers (0–7)

Quarter	1	2	3	4	Total
**Raiders**	9	3	0	3	**15**
Chargers	0	0	7	6	**13**

at Qualcomm Stadium, San Diego, California

- Date: October 29, 2000
- Game time: 1:25 p.m. EST
- Game weather: 63 °F (17.2 °C), relative humidity 82%, wind 8 miles per hour (13 km/h; 7.0 kn)
- Game attendance: 66,659
- Referee: Dick Hantak
- TV announcers (ESPN): Mike Patrick, Joe Theismann, Paul Maguire and Solomon Wilcots
- Box score

Game information

**First quarter**

- OAK — Janikowski 40-yard field goal, 9:37. Raiders 3–0. **Drive: 13 plays, 44 yards, 5:23.**
- OAK — Janikowski 40-yard field goal, 4:34. Raiders 6–0. **Drive: 9 plays, 62 yards, 2:56.**
- OAK — Janikowski 54-yard field goal, 0:14. Raiders 9–0. **Drive: 6 plays, 30 yards, 2:42.**

**Second quarter**

- OAK — Janikowski 29-yard field goal, 6:55. Raiders 12–0. **Drive: 9 plays, 37 yards, 5:32.**

**Third quarter**

- SDG — Jones 8-yard pass from Harbaugh (Carney kick), 8:51. Raiders 12–7. **Drive: 12 plays, 76 yards, 6:09.**

**Fourth quarter**

- SDG — Jones 21-yard pass from Harbaugh (pass failed), 5:58. Chargers 13–12. **Drive: 6 plays, 37 yards, 3:22.**
- OAK — Janikowski 24-yard field goal, 0:13. Raiders 15–13. **Drive: 13 plays, 58 yards, 5:45.**

**Top passers**

- OAK — Rich Gannon, 16/35, 156 yards, INT
- SDG — Jim Harbaugh, 25/35, 222 yards, 2 TD, INT

**Top rushers**

- OAK — Rich Gannon, 7 rushes, 27 yards
  OAK, Napoleon Kaufman, 6 rushes, 27 yards
- SDG — Terrell Fletcher, 9 rushes, 23 yards

**Top receivers**

- OAK — Andre Rison, 5 receptions, 67 yards
- SDG — Freddie Jones, 10 receptions, 111 yards, 2 TD

==== Week 16: at Seattle Seahawks ====
Week 16: Oakland Raiders (11–3) at Seattle Seahawks (5–9)

Quarter	1	2	3	4	Total
Raiders	7	3	7	7	**24**
**Seahawks**	10	3	0	14	**27**

at Husky Stadium, Seattle

- Date: December 16
- Game time: 1:06 pm local
- Game weather: rain, 52 °F (11.1 °C), 63% humidity, wind S 21 miles per hour (34 km/h)
- Game attendance: 68,681
- Referee: Bernie Kukar
- TV announcers (CBS): Dick Enberg, Dan Dierdorf, and Bonnie Bernstein
- Gamebook

Game information

**First quarter**

- SEA – Mack Strong 13-yard pass from Jon Kitna (Rian Lindell kick), 11:43 (SEA 7–0)
- OAK – Andre Rison 14-yard pass from Rich Gannon (Sebastian Janikowski kick), 7:12 (Tied 7–7)
- SEA – Rian Lindell 40-yard field goal, 0:58 (SEA 10–7)

**Second quarter**

- OAK – Sebastian Janikowski 25-yard field goal, 6:04 (Tied 10–10)
- SEA – Rian Lindell 52-yard field goal, 0:00 (SEA 13–10)

**Third quarter**

- OAK – Randy Jordan 6-yard run (Sebastian Janikowski kick), 6:58 (OAK 17–13)

**Fourth quarter**

- OAK – Randy Jordan 7-yard run (Sebastian Janikowski kick), 11:48 (OAK 24–13)
- SEA – Shaun Alexander 4-yard run (PAT failed), 5:15 (OAK 24–19)
- SEA – Safety, James Williams tackled Marquez Pope in end zone, 2:24 (OAK 24–21)
- SEA – Darrell Jackson 13-yard pass from Jon Kitna (PAT failed), 0:28 (SEA 27–24)

**Top passers**

- OAK – Rich Gannon: 5/17, 136 yds, 1 TD, 3 INT
- SEA – Jon Kitna: 19/30, 177 yds, 2 TD, 1 INT

**Top rushers**

- OAK – Tyrone Wheatley: 26 car, 146 yds
- SEA – Ricky Watters: 26 car, 168 yds

**Top receivers**

- OAK – Randy Jordan: 1 rec, 55 yds
- SEA – Darrell Jackson: 4 rec, 52 yds, 1 TD

**Team** – pass – rush – total – to

- OAK – 134 – 227 – 361 – 3
- SEA – 153 – 173 – 326 – 2

== Standings ==
AFC West
	W	L	T	PCT	PF	PA	STK
^{(2)} Oakland Raiders	12	4	0	.750	479	299	W1
^{(5)} Denver Broncos	11	5	0	.688	485	369	W1
Kansas City Chiefs	7	9	0	.438	355	354	L1
Seattle Seahawks	6	10	0	.375	320	405	L1
San Diego Chargers	1	15	0	.063	269	440	L4

== Playoffs ==
=== AFC Divisional Playoff Game ===
Divisional Round — Miami Dolphins (12–5) at Oakland Raiders (12–4)

Quarter	1	2	3	4	Total
Dolphins	0	0	0	0	0
Raiders	10	10	7	0	27

at Network Associates Coliseum, Oakland, California

- Game time: 4:00 p.m. EST/1:00 p.m. PST
- Game weather: 59 °F (15 °C), clear
- Game attendance: 61,998
- Referee: Phil Luckett
- TV announcers (CBS): Greg Gumbel, Phil Simms, and Armen Keteyian

Game information

First quarter

- OAK — James 90-yard interception return (Janikowski kick), 11:36. Raiders 7–0
- OAK — Janikowski 36-yard field goal, 4:52. Raiders 10–0

Second quarter

- OAK — Janikowski 33-yard field goal, 8:36. Raiders 13–0
- OAK — Jett 6-yard pass from Gannon (Janikowski kick), 1:53. Raiders 20–0

Third quarter

- OAK — Wheatley 2-yard rush (Janikowski kick), 5:56. Raiders 27–0

Fourth quarter

- No scoring plays

Top passers

- MIA — Jay Fiedler, 18/37, 176 yards, 3 INT
- OAK — Rich Gannon, 12/18, 143 yards, TD

Top rushers

- MIA — Jay Fiedler, 3 rushes, 12 yards

MIA — Autry Denson 3 rushes, 12 yards
MIA — J. J. Johnson, 3 rushes, 12 yards

- OAK — Tyrone Wheatley, 19 rushes, 56 yards

Top receivers

- MIA — O. J. McDuffie, 3 receptions, 43 yards
- OAK — Terry Kirby, 2 receptions, 35 yards

Raiders go to the AFC Championship Game but lost to the eventual Super Bowl Champion Baltimore Ravens 16-3.

=== AFC Championship Game ===
AFC Championship - Baltimore Ravens (13–4) at Oakland Raiders (12–5)

Quarter	1	2	3	4	Total
Ravens	0	10	3	3	16
Raiders	0	0	3	0	3

at Network Associates Coliseum, Oakland, California

- Game time: 4:00 p.m. EST/1:00 p.m. PST
- Game weather: 55 °F (12.8 °C), clear
- Game attendance: 62,784
- Referee: Bill Carollo
- TV announcers (CBS): Greg Gumbel, Phil Simms, Armen Keteyian, and Bonnie Bernstein

Game information

First quarter

- No scoring plays

Second quarter

- BAL — Sharpe 96-yard pass from Dilfer (Stover kick), 11:08. Ravens 7–0
- BAL — Stover 31-yard field goal, 8:19. Ravens 10–0

Third quarter

- OAK — Janikowski 24-yard field goal, 10:07. Ravens 10–3
- BAL — Stover 28-yard field goal, 5:08. Ravens 13–3

Fourth quarter

- BAL — Stover 21-yard field goal, 7:28. Ravens 16–3

Top passers

- BAL — Trent Dilfer, 9/18, 190 yards, TD, INT
- OAK — Rich Gannon, 11/21, 80 yards, 2 INT

Top rushers

- BAL — Jamal Lewis, 29 rushes, 79 yards
- OAK — Bobby Hoying, 3 rushes, 13 yards

Top receivers

- BAL — Shannon Sharpe, 1 receptions, 96 yards, TD
- OAK — Tim Brown, 5 receptions, 48 yards

Raiders lost and in 2001 finished 10-6. Win to the New York Jets in the AFC Wild Card Round 38-24. But lost to the eventual Super Bowl Champion New England Patriots in the Tuck Rule game 16-13.

== Awards and records ==
- Led NFL, Net Yards Gained, Rushing (2,470 yards)
- Led NFL, First Downs, Rushing (128 First Downs)
- Led NFL, Rushing Offense
- Eric Allen, AFC Defensive Player of the Month, December
- Rich Gannon, Bert Bell Award
- Rich Gannon, All-Pro selection
- Rich Gannon, AFC Pro Bowl Selection
- Rich Gannon, PFW/PFWA All-Pro Team
- Rich Gannon, Pro Bowl MVP Award
- Shane Lechler, Single Season Record, Highest Punting Average in One Season, 45.9 Yards
- Shane Lechler, All-NFL Team (as selected by the Associated Press, Pro Football Weekly, and the Pro Football Writers of America)
- Shane Lechler, PFW/PFWA All-Rookie Team (as selected by the Associated Press, Pro Football Weekly, and the Pro Football Writers of America)

=== Pro Bowl selections ===
- Rich Gannon, AFC Pro Bowl Selection,
- Lincoln Kennedy, AFC Pro Bowl Selection,
- Steve Wisniewski, AFC Pro Bowl Selection,
- Charles Woodson, AFC Pro Bowl Selection,

=== Team leaders ===
- Scoring – Sebastian Janikowski, 112 Points
- Rushing – Tyrone Wheatley, 1,046 Yards
- Passing – Rich Gannon, 3,430 Yards
- Receiving – Tim Brown, 1,128 Yards
- Receptions – Tim Brown, 76
- Interceptions – Eric Allen, William Thomas, 6 each
- Sacks – Grady Jackson,8.0
