= James Jett =

American football player (born 1970)

No. 82
- Position: Wide receiver

Personal information
- Born: December 28, 1970 (age 55); Charles Town, West Virginia, U.S.
- Listed height: 5 ft 10 in (1.78 m)
- Listed weight: 170 lb (77 kg)

Career information
- High school: Jefferson (Shenandoah Junction, West Virginia)
- College: West Virginia
- NFL draft: 1993: undrafted

Career history
- Los Angeles / Oakland Raiders (1993–2002); Buffalo Bills (2003)*
- * Offseason or practice squad member only

Awards and highlights
- PFWA All-Rookie Team (1993)

Career NFL statistics
- Receptions: 256
- Receiving yards: 4,417
- Receiving touchdowns: 30
- Stats at Pro Football Reference

James Sherman Jett (born December 28, 1970), is an American former professional football player and Olympic sprinter. He played football as a wide receiver for nine seasons with the Los Angeles/Oakland Raiders of the National Football League (NFL) from 1993 to 2002. He attended college at West Virginia University. He guided the Jefferson High School Cougars of Shenandoah Junction, West Virginia to the state playoffs in 1988. James also ran for the JHS Cougar's Track Team.

== Collegiate career ==
Jett played college football at West Virginia University where he was a four-year starter at receiver.

=== Freshman season (1989) ===
Jett entered the 1989 season as the only true freshman to play on the eventual Gator Bowl team. Jett was one of the targets, along with senior Reggie Rembert, for All-American quarterback Major Harris. Along with receiving, Jett led the Mountaineers as a return specialist. Jett finished the season with only 8 receptions but 179 yards and three touchdowns. He also had a total of 35 returns for 504 yards.

=== Sophomore season (1990) ===
Jett entered his sophomore season in 1990 as the leading returning receiver for the Mountaineers, who lost both Rembert and Harris. Jett totaled his best statistical season in his career, recording 31 receptions for 652 yards and 2 touchdowns. He also had a career-low 10 returns for 164 yards.

=== Junior season (1991) ===
As a junior, Jett saw his numbers decrease to only 9 receptions for 171 yards and two touchdowns. However, he totaled 45 returns for 619 yards, both career-highs. Jett also had five carries for 28 yards and a pass for 27 yards. He finished the season with 845 all-purpose yards.

=== Senior season (1992) ===
In his final collegiate season, James Jett recorded 19 receptions for 382 yards and 4 touchdowns. He also had 35 returns for 333 yards. Jett finished his career against Louisiana Tech, where Jett was on the receiving end of a stadium-record 78-yard touchdown reception.

Jett played in the Japan Bowl All-Star game upon his graduation.

=== Legacy ===
James Jett finished his career with 1,384 yards and 11 touchdowns. He also had 125 returns for 1,620 yards, totaling 3,076 career all-purpose yards. His all-purpose yardage was fifth on WVU's all-time career list, while his receiving totals was eighth at the time of his graduation.

Jett was inducted into the West Virginia University Sports Hall of Fame in 2002.

== Track and field ==
Medal record

Men's athletics

Representing the United States

Olympic Games
Gold medal – first place	1992 Barcelona	4 × 100 m relay

Jett was also an Olympic sprinter. While at West Virginia University, he was a seven-time All-American in track, finishing fifth at 100 meters in the U.S. Olympic Trials in New Orleans, earning him a spot on the 4 × 100 m relay Olympic team, that won in the 1992 Summer Olympics with a time of 38.95 seconds. He also outran eventual Olympic gold medalist Carl Lewis in the 100 meters during prelims to the games.

Jett ran the first two rounds of the 4 × 100 m relay in Barcelona, then gave his spot in the finals to Carl Lewis. All team members earned a gold medal. Jett earned NCAA indoor and outdoor All-America honors in the 50 meters, 100 meters and 200 meters during his career and finished as NCAA runner-up at 100 meters and 200 meters in 1992.

His personal bests are 10.10 seconds in the 100 meters and 19.91 seconds in the 200 meters.

=== Personal bests ===
Event	Time (seconds)	Venue	Date
55 meters	6.12	Morgantown, West Virginia	February 10, 1990
100 meters	10.10	Sestriere, Italy	July 21, 1992
200 meters	19.91 NWI	Morgantown, West Virginia	April 18, 1992

== Professional career ==
Pre-draft measurables
Height	Weight	Arm length	Hand span	40-yard dash	10-yard split	20-yard split	20-yard shuttle	Vertical jump
5 ft 9 3/8 in (1.76 m)	167 lb (76 kg)	30 3/4 in (0.78 m)	8 7/8 in (0.23 m)	4.49 s	1.59 s	2.62 s	3.89 s	33.0 in (0.84 m)
All values from NFL Combine

=== 1993–1995 ===
James Jett signed with the Los Angeles Raiders as an undrafted free agent following the 1993 NFL draft.

During his rookie season, Jett led the NFL with over 23 yards per reception and also recorded 771 yards on 33 receptions for 3 touchdowns. Jett averaged 48.2 yards per game his debut season, played in all 16 games but only starting one.

In the 1994 season, Jett played in all 16 games, only starting one, again. However, he only recorded 15 receptions for 253 yards (16.9 yards per reception). In 1995, Jett played in all the games on the season but did not start any contests. He finished the season with 13 receptions for 179 yards and a touchdown.

=== 1996–1998 ===
In 1996, Jett finally started all 16 games on the year. At age 26, he recorded 43 receptions for 601 yards and 4 touchdowns. Jett won the NFL Fastest Man Competition following the season.

The following season, he was second among NFL receivers with a personal-best 12 touchdowns in 1997. Jett finished with a career-high 46 receptions for 804 yards. Jett was a finalist in the NFL Fastest Man Competition after winning the competition the previous season.

In the 1998 season, Jett recorded a career-high 882 yards on 45 receptions for 6 touchdowns. He also tallied a career-high 55 yards per game in his final season of starting all 16 games.

=== 1999–2002 ===
At 29 years old, in 1999, Jett recorded 552 yards on 39 receptions for 2 touchdowns. The following year, 2000, he finished with 20 receptions for 356 yards and 2 touchdowns, including a career-long 84-yard reception against the Atlanta Falcons.

In 2001, at the age of 31 years, Jett played in 11 games on the season, recording two receptions for 19 yards. In his final professional season, 2002, the 32-year-old played in and started only one game, but did not record a statistic.

=== Legacy ===
James Jett finished his career with 256 receptions for 4,417 yards and 30 touchdowns, a 17.3 yard per reception average. Jett finished his career as the 8th-leading receiver in Oakland Raiders team history. He was one of two Los Angeles Raiders to remain with the team through Super Bowl XXXVII (the other being fellow wide receiver Tim Brown).

== NFL career statistics ==
Legend
	Led the league
**Bold**	Career high

=== Regular season ===
Year	Team	Games		Receiving				
Year	Team	GP	GS	Rec	Yds	Avg	Lng	TD
1993	RAI	16	1	33	771	**23.4**	74	3
1994	RAI	16	1	15	253	16.9	54	0
1995	OAK	16	0	13	179	13.8	26	1
1996	OAK	16	16	43	601	14.0	58	4
1997	OAK	16	16	**46**	804	17.5	56	**12**
1998	OAK	16	16	45	**882**	19.6	75	6
1999	OAK	16	11	39	552	14.2	43	2
2000	OAK	16	13	20	356	17.8	**84**	2
2001	OAK	11	0	2	19	9.5	10	0
2002	OAK	1	1	0	0	0.0	0	0
		140	75	256	4,417	17.3	84	30

=== Playoffs ===
Year	Team	Games		Receiving				
Year	Team	GP	GS	Rec	Yds	Avg	Lng	TD
1993	RAI	2	0	4	**114**	**28.5**	**54**	**1**
2000	OAK	2	1	**5**	29	5.8	12	**1**
2001	OAK	2	0	4	31	7.8	13	**1**
		6	1	13	174	13.4	54	3
