= Anthony Dorsett =

American gridiron football player (born 1973)

No. 30, 33
- Position: Safety

Personal information
- Born: September 14, 1973 (age 53); Aliquippa, Pennsylvania, U.S.
- Listed height: 5 ft 11 in (1.80 m)
- Listed weight: 205 lb (93 kg)

Career information
- High school: J. J. Pearce (Richardson, Texas)
- College: Pittsburgh
- NFL draft: 1996: 6th round, 177th overall pick

Career history
- Houston Oilers / Tennessee Oilers / Tennessee Titans (1996–1999); Oakland Raiders (2000–2003); Toronto Argonauts (2007)*; Omaha Nighthawks (2010)*
- * Offseason or practice squad member only

Career NFL statistics
- Tackles: 267
- Interceptions: 3
- Touchdowns: 2
- Stats at Pro Football Reference

Anthony Drew Dorsett Jr. (born September 14, 1973) is an American former professional football player who was a safety in the National Football League (NFL). He played college football for the Pittsburgh Panthers. Dorsett was selected by the Houston Oilers in the sixth round of the 1996 NFL draft. He was also a member of the Oakland Raiders, Toronto Argonauts and Omaha Nighthawks. He is the son of Pro Football Hall of Fame running back Tony Dorsett.

== Early life ==
Dorsett played high school football at Pearce High School in the Dallas suburb of Richardson, Texas.

== College career ==
Dorsett played college football at the University of Pittsburgh where he played in forty-two games, starting seventeen. Dorsett finished his college career with eighty tackles and three interceptions.

== Professional career ==
Pre-draft measurables
Height	Weight	Arm length	Hand span	40-yard dash	10-yard split	20-yard split	20-yard shuttle	Vertical jump	Broad jump	Bench press
5 ft 10 7/8 in (1.80 m)	201 lb (91 kg)	31 7/8 in (0.81 m)	9 3/4 in (0.25 m)	4.47 s	1.52 s	2.60 s	4.06 s	39.5 in (1.00 m)	10 ft 6 in (3.20 m)	20 reps

=== NFL ===
Dorsett was selected in the sixth round of the 1996 NFL draft by the Houston Oilers. After four seasons with the Oilers, who became the Tennessee Titans, Dorsett joined the Oakland Raiders in 2000, playing four seasons with the team. In 1999, the Titans made it to Super Bowl XXXIV in which Dorsett started, however they lost to the Kurt Warner-led St. Louis Rams. In 2002, he also played on the Raiders team which made it to Super Bowl XXXVII in which Dorsett also started, however they lost to the Brad Johnson-quarterbacked, Warren Sapp-led Tampa Bay Buccaneers.

=== CFL ===
On June 1, 2007, Dorsett signed with the Toronto Argonauts of the Canadian Football League, but was subsequently cut in training camp on June 18, 2007.

=== UFL ===
Dorsett was signed by the Omaha Nighthawks of the United Football League in 2010.

=== Later career ===
Dorsett won the 2010 Millrose Games "Super 60" 60 meters sprint in 2010 and finished runner-up in 2011. He also hosted a radio show.

== NFL career statistics ==
Legend
	Led the league
**Bold**	Career high

=== Regular season ===
Year	Team	Games		Tackles				Interceptions				Fumbles			
Year	Team	GP	GS	Comb	Solo	Ast	Sck	Int	Yds	TD	Lng	FF	FR	Yds	TD
1996	HOU	8	0	0	0	0	0.0	0	0	0	0	0	0	0	0
1997	TEN	16	0	8	5	3	0.0	0	0	0	0	0	0	0	0
1998	TEN	16	0	4	3	1	0.0	0	0	0	0	0	0	0	0
1999	TEN	16	1	20	17	3	0.0	1	43	0	**43**	0	0	0	0
2000	OAK	16	16	**75**	55	**20**	**1.0**	0	0	0	0	**2**	0	0	0
2001	OAK	16	16	71	**62**	9	**1.0**	**2**	**65**	**2**	39	0	**1**	0	0
2002	OAK	16	7	40	29	11	0.0	0	0	0	0	0	**1**	0	0
2003	OAK	14	6	49	41	8	0.0	0	0	0	0	0	**1**	**7**	0
		118	46	267	212	55	2.0	3	108	2	43	2	3	7	0

=== Playoffs ===
Year	Team	Games		Tackles				Interceptions				Fumbles			
Year	Team	GP	GS	Comb	Solo	Ast	Sck	Int	Yds	TD	Lng	FF	FR	Yds	TD
1999	TEN	4	1	9	7	2	0.0	0	0	0	0	0	0	0	0
2000	OAK	2	2	9	7	2	0.0	0	0	0	0	0	0	0	0
2001	OAK	2	2	14	11	**3**	0.0	0	0	0	0	0	0	0	0
2002	OAK	3	3	**23**	**20**	**3**	0.0	0	0	0	0	0	**2**	0	0
		11	8	55	45	10	0.0	0	0	0	0	0	2	0	0
