= Chris Cooper (defensive lineman) =

American football player (born 1977)

No. 75, 94, 93
- Position: Defensive end

Personal information
- Born: December 27, 1977 (age 48); Lincoln, Nebraska, U.S.
- Listed height: 6 ft 5 in (1.96 m)
- Listed weight: 285 lb (129 kg)

Career information
- High school: Lincoln Southeast
- College: Nebraska-Omaha
- NFL draft: 2001: 6th round, 184th overall pick

Career history
- Oakland Raiders (2001–2003); Dallas Cowboys (2004); San Francisco 49ers (2004–2005); Seattle Seahawks (2006); Arizona Cardinals (2006–2007); Seattle Seahawks (2008); California Redwoods (2009); Oakland Raiders (2010)*
- * Offseason or practice squad member only

Awards and highlights
- Division II All-American (2000); All-NCC (2000); Second-team All-NCC (1999)

Career NFL statistics
- Total tackles: 136
- Sacks: 8.5
- Forced fumbles: 2
- Fumble recoveries: 4
- Interceptions: 1
- Stats at Pro Football Reference

Christopher Lyle Cooper (born December 27, 1977) is an American former professional football player who was a defensive end in the National Football League (NFL) for the Oakland Raiders, Dallas Cowboys, San Francisco 49ers, Seattle Seahawks and Arizona Cardinals. He also was a member of the California Redwoods in the United Football League (UFL). He played college football for the Nebraska–Omaha Mavericks.

== Early life ==
Cooper attended Lincoln Southeast High School. He received All-state honors at defensive tackle and offensive tackle as a senior. He also practiced basketball, playing at forward and center.

== College career ==
He accepted a football scholarship from Division II University of Nebraska-Omaha, where he became a four-year starter at defensive tackle.

As a redshirt freshman, he registered 21 tackles, 6 tackles for loss and 4 sacks. As a sophomore, he tallied 29 tackles, 10 tackles for loss (second on the team) and 7 sacks (led the team). As a junior, he had 45 tackles and 9 sacks (led the team).

As a senior, he posted 44 tackles (fourth on the team), 20 tackles for loss (led the team), 11 sacks (led the team), 5 passes defensed, 2 forced fumbles and 4 fumble recoveries. He set school records for career sacks (31) and tackles for loss (53).

== Pre-draft ==
Pre-draft measurables
Height	Weight	40-yard dash	10-yard split	20-yard split	20-yard shuttle	Three-cone drill	Vertical jump	Broad jump	Bench press
6 ft 5 1/4 in (1.96 m)	272 lb (123 kg)	4.89 s	1.67 s	2.79 s	4.21 s	7.12 s	35 1/2 in (0.90 m)	9 ft 6 in (2.90 m)	24 reps
All values from NFL Combine.

== Professional career ==
Cooper was selected by the Oakland Raiders in the sixth round (184th overall) of the 2001 NFL draft. He appeared in 11 games with one start, while posting 22 tackles, 2 sacks and one interception. He had 6 tackles and one sack against the Kansas City Chiefs. He had 5 tackles and one sack against the Tennessee Titans.

In 2002, he appeared in 16 games with one start, while collecting 19 tackles one sack, one pass defensed and one forced fumble. He had 3 tackles, one sack and one forced fumble against the New England Patriots. He made 3 defensive tackles and also played on special teams in the AFC Divisional playoff game against the New York Jets. He had 3 defensive tackles in the AFC Championship game against the Tennessee Titans. He had 3 defensive tackles in Super Bowl XXXVII against the Tampa Bay Buccaneers.

In 2003, he appeared in 16 games with 9 starts, while recording 49 tackles, 2.5 sacks, 3 passes defensed, one forced fumble and 3 fumble recoveries. He had 4 tackles against the Detroit Lions. He made 4 tackles against the New York Jets. He had 5 tackles, one sack, one forced fumble and one fumble recovery against the Minnesota Vikings. He made 3 tackles, one sack and one pass defensed against the Kansas City Chiefs. He had 7 tackles against the Denver Broncos. He made 6 tackles and a half-sack against the San Diego Chargers. In November, he was one of four Raider players (Bill Romanowski, Barret Robbins and Dana Stubblefield) implicated in the BALCO scandal. All four were notified by the NFL after testing positive for the designer steroid tetrahydrogestrinone (THG), but he was not suspended, because the league was unaware of the steroid at the time of the original tests.

On September 11, 2004, he was traded to the Dallas Cowboys in exchange for a conditional draft choice (not exercised). He appeared in 2 games as a backup and was declared inactive in 5 contests. He was waived on November 3.

On November 10, 2004, he was signed by the San Francisco 49ers. He appeared in 8 games with 2 starts. He made 3 tackles and one sack against the Tampa Bay Buccaneers. He had 7 tackles against the Buffalo Bills. He finished the season with 16 tackles and one sack. On August 23, 2005, he was placed on the injured reserve list with a shoulder injury. He was released on February 23.

On May 8, 2006, he was signed by the Seattle Seahawks. He was declared inactive in the first 2 games. On September 22, 2006, he was released to make room for the acquired wide receiver Deion Branch. On September 26, 2006, he was signed by the Arizona Cardinals. He had 23 tackles, 2 sacks, 3 passes defensed and one fumble recovery as a backup. In 2007, he appeared in 12 games (declared inactive 4 contests) as a backup defensive end in the team's 3-4 defense, tallying 6 tackles. He was released on February 21, 2008.

On March 25, 2008, he signed with the Seattle Seahawks. He was lost for the season and placed on the injured reserve list on August 30.

In 2009, he signed with the California Redwoods in the United Football League. On April 6, 2010, he was signed as a free agent by the Oakland Raiders. He was released on September 4. He finished his career with 134 tackles, 8.5 sacks, one interception, 8 passes defensed and 4 forced fumbles.

== NFL career statistics ==
Legend
**Bold**	Career high

=== Regular season ===
Year	Team	Games		Tackles					Interceptions					Fumbles			
Year	Team	GP	GS	Cmb	Solo	Ast	Sck	TFL	Int	Yds	TD	Lng	PD	FF	FR	Yds	TD
2001	OAK	11	1	22	14	8	2.0	6	**1**	0	0	0	1	0	0	0	0
2002	OAK	**16**	1	19	14	5	1.0	0	0	0	0	0	1	**1**	0	0	0
2003	OAK	**16**	**9**	**49**	**40**	**9**	**2.5**	**8**	0	0	0	0	2	**1**	**3**	0	0
2004	DAL	2	0	0	0	0	0.0	0	0	0	0	0	0	0	0	0	0
2004	SF	8	2	15	11	4	1.0	3	0	0	0	0	0	0	0	0	0
2006	ARI	13	0	21	14	7	2.0	1	0	0	0	0	**4**	0	1	0	0
2007	ARI	12	0	10	10	0	0.0	0	0	0	0	0	0	0	0	0	0
		78	13	136	103	33	8.5	18	1	0	0	0	8	2	4	0	0

=== Playoffs ===
Year	Team	Games		Tackles					Interceptions					Fumbles			
Year	Team	GP	GS	Cmb	Solo	Ast	Sck	TFL	Int	Yds	TD	Lng	PD	FF	FR	Yds	TD
2001	OAK	2	0	6	**5**	1	**1.0**	**2**	0	0	0	0	0	0	0	0	0
2002	OAK	**3**	0	**9**	4	**5**	0.5	0	0	0	0	0	0	0	0	0	0
		5	0	15	9	6	1.5	2	0	0	0	0	0	0	0	0	0
