= Grady Jackson =

American football player (born 1973)

No. 90, 91, 75, 74
- Position: Defensive tackle

Personal information
- Born: January 21, 1973 (age 53); Greensboro, Alabama, U.S.
- Listed height: 6 ft 2 in (1.88 m)
- Listed weight: 345 lb (156 kg)

Career information
- High school: East (Greensboro)
- College: Hinds CC; Knoxville
- NFL draft: 1997: 6th round, 193rd overall pick

Career history
- Oakland Raiders (1997–2001); New Orleans Saints (2002–2003); Green Bay Packers (2003–2005); Atlanta Falcons (2006–2007); Jacksonville Jaguars (2007); Atlanta Falcons (2008); Detroit Lions (2009); Florida Tuskers (2010)

Career NFL statistics
- Tackles: 510
- Sacks: 35.5
- Forced fumbles: 8
- Fumble recoveries: 7
- Passes defended: 24
- Stats at Pro Football Reference

Grady O'Neal Jackson (born January 21, 1973) is an American former professional football player who was a defensive tackle in the National Football League (NFL). He was selected by the Oakland Raiders in the sixth round of the 1997 NFL draft. He played college football for the Knoxville Bulldogs.

Jackson also played for the New Orleans Saints, Green Bay Packers, Jacksonville Jaguars, Atlanta Falcons, Detroit Lions and Florida Tuskers.

== College career ==
Jackson played defensive tackle at Knoxville College, after transferring from Hinds Community College. While at Hinds, he was a two-time Junior College All-American and the National Junior College Player of the Year following the 1995–1996 seasons.

== Professional career ==
=== Green Bay Packers ===
Jackson was represented by agent Drew Rosenhaus. Before the 2005 NFL season, Jackson said he would hold-out of training camp in order to secure a new contract with the Packers. However, he reported for training camp on the first day. Several days later, however, Jackson told reporters that he no longer felt wanted in the Packers organization and requested to be released or traded to another team, but later retracted those statements, and played out the 2005 season without a new contract.

=== Atlanta Falcons (first stint) ===
In 2006, as a member of the Atlanta Falcons, Jackson led the league in tackles for a loss. On October 23, 2007, the Falcons released Jackson.

=== Jacksonville Jaguars ===
On October 30, 2007, the Jacksonville Jaguars signed Jackson to a one-year contract.

=== Atlanta Falcons (second stint) ===
Jackson was re-signed by the Falcons on July 28, 2008. On December 2, 2008, the NFL reported that he had failed a drug test and they would further investigate the circumstances before deciding upon disciplinary action.

=== Detroit Lions ===
On March 4, 2009, Jackson was signed by the Detroit Lions.

Jackson was released on March 5, 2010.

== NFL career statistics ==
Legend
**Bold**	Career high

=== Regular season ===
Year	Team	Games		Tackles				Interceptions				Fumbles			
Year	Team	GP	GS	Comb	Solo	Ast	Sck	Int	Yds	TD	Lng	FF	FR	Yds	TD
1997	OAK	5	0	6	4	2	0.0	0	0	0	0	0	0	0	0
1998	OAK	15	1	39	29	10	3.0	0	0	0	0	1	1	**2**	0
1999	OAK	15	0	34	25	9	4.0	0	0	0	0	1	1	0	0
2000	OAK	16	15	68	51	**17**	**8.0**	0	0	0	0	**2**	1	0	0
2001	OAK	16	16	**69**	**52**	**17**	4.0	0	0	0	0	0	1	0	0
2002	NOR	15	15	43	31	12	5.5	0	0	0	0	1	**3**	0	0
2003	NOR	7	6	25	20	5	3.5	0	0	0	0	0	0	0	0
2003	GNB	8	1	23	16	7	2.5	0	0	0	0	1	0	0	0
2004	GNB	10	10	23	17	6	1.0	0	0	0	0	0	0	0	0
2005	GNB	16	16	55	39	16	1.0	0	0	0	0	1	0	0	0
2006	ATL	16	15	36	31	5	0.0	0	0	0	0	1	0	0	0
2007	ATL	7	7	20	18	2	1.0	0	0	0	0	0	0	0	0
2007	JAX	9	0	9	8	1	0.0	0	0	0	0	0	0	0	0
2008	ATL	15	14	28	23	5	2.0	0	0	0	0	0	0	0	0
2009	DET	15	13	32	20	12	0.0	0	0	0	0	0	0	0	0
		185	129	510	384	126	35.5	0	0	0	0	8	7	2	0

=== Playoffs ===
Year	Team	Games		Tackles				Interceptions				Fumbles			
Year	Team	GP	GS	Comb	Solo	Ast	Sck	Int	Yds	TD	Lng	FF	FR	Yds	TD
2000	OAK	2	2	**10**	7	**3**	0.0	0	0	0	0	0	0	0	0
2001	OAK	2	2	9	**9**	0	0.0	0	0	0	0	0	**1**	0	0
2003	GNB	2	2	7	5	2	0.0	0	0	0	0	0	0	0	0
2004	GNB	1	1	0	0	0	0.0	0	0	0	0	0	0	0	0
2007	JAX	2	0	3	2	1	0.0	0	0	0	0	0	0	0	0
2008	ATL	1	0	2	1	1	0.0	0	0	0	0	0	0	0	0
		10	7	31	24	7	0.0	0	0	0	0	0	1	0	0
