= Ray Perryman =

American gridiron football player (born 1978)

No. 25, 23
- Position: Defensive back

Personal information
- Born: November 27, 1978 (age 47); Phoenix, Arizona, U.S.
- Listed height: 5 ft 11 in (1.80 m)
- Listed weight: 195 lb (88 kg)

Career information
- High school: South Mountain (Phoenix)
- College: Northern Arizona
- NFL draft: 2001: 5th round, 158th overall pick

Career history
- Oakland Raiders (2001); Amsterdam Admirals (2002); Baltimore Ravens (2002); Jacksonville Jaguars (2003–2004); Frankfurt Galaxy (2005); Jacksonville Jaguars (2005); Edmonton Eskimos (2007)
- Stats at Pro Football Reference

Ray Perryman (born November 27, 1978) is an American former professional football defensive back. He was selected by the Oakland Raiders in the fifth round of the 2001 NFL draft with the 158th overall pick. He played for the Baltimore Ravens in 2002, the Jacksonville Jaguars from 2003 to 2004, and the Edmonton Eskimos in 2007.
