= Brandon Jennings (American football) =

American football player (born 1978)

No. 39
- Position: Cornerback

Personal information
- Born: July 15, 1978 (age 48); Channelview, Texas, U.S.
- Listed height: 6 ft 0 in (1.83 m)
- Listed weight: 190 lb (86 kg)

Career information
- High school: Channelview
- College: Texas A&M
- NFL draft: 2000: undrafted

Career history
- Oakland Raiders (2000–2001); Cleveland Browns (2001); Oakland Raiders (2001); Green Bay Packers (2002)*; Oakland Raiders (2002); Houston Texans (2003)*
- * Offseason or practice squad member only

Career NFL statistics
- Games: 20
- Tackles: 22
- Passes defended: 2
- Stats at Pro Football Reference

Brandon Jennings (born July 15, 1978) is an American former professional football player who was a cornerback in the National Football League (NFL). He played his college football for the Texas A&M Aggies. Jennings was signed as an undrafted free agent by the Oakland Raiders in 2000. He played four seasons for the Raiders, Cleveland Browns, Green Bay Packers, and Houston Texans.

== Professional career ==
Pre-draft measurables
Height	Weight	Arm length	Hand span	40-yard dash	10-yard split	20-yard split	20-yard shuttle	Three-cone drill	Vertical jump	Broad jump	Bench press
6 ft 0 3/8 in (1.84 m)	198 lb (90 kg)	30 3/4 in (0.78 m)	9 in (0.23 m)	4.54 s	1.59 s	2.65 s	4.14 s	6.91 s	38.0 in (0.97 m)	10 ft 3 in (3.12 m)	16 reps
All values from NFL Combine

Jennings went undrafted in the 2000 NFL draft, but was signed by the Oakland Raiders. During his rookie season in 2000 he recorded one tackle. On October 14, 2001, Jennings was waived by the Oakland Raiders. On October 17, 2001, Jennings was claimed off waivers by the Cleveland Browns. On October 24, 2001, Jennings was waived by the Cleveland Browns. On October 29, 2001, the Oakland Raiders signed Jennings to their practice squad. On November 7, 2001, the Oakland Raiders promoted Jennings to their active roster. On November 14, 2001, the Oakland Raiders released Jennings from their active roster and re-signed him to their practice squad two days later. Jennings recorded 12 combined tackles in 2001 and appeared in eight games.

On September 1, 2002, the Oakland Raiders released Jennings as part of their final roster cuts. On October 9, 2002, the Green Bay Packers signed Jennings to their practice squad. On October 15, 2002, the Green Bay Packers released Jennings from their practice squad. On October 24, 2002, the Oakland Raiders signed Jennings to their practice squad. The following day, the Oakland Raiders promoted Jennings from their practice squad to their active roster. On January 12, 2003, the Oakland Raiders waived Jennings. On January 27, 2003, the Houston Texans claimed Jennings off of waivers. On February 27, 2003, the Houston Texans offered Jennings a one-year, $605,000 tender as a restricted free agent. One March 21, 2003, it was reported that Jennings had officially signed his restricted free agent tender with the Houston Texans. On August 13, 2003, the Houston Texans released Jennings as part of their roster cuts.
