= Blandino =

Surname list

Blandino is a surname. Notable people with the surname include:

- Alex Blandino (born 1992), Nicaraguan-American baseball player
- Dean Blandino (born 1971), American football officiator and rules analyst
- Joe Blandino (born 1992), Dominican musician
- Xiomara Blandino (born 1984), Nicaraguan beauty pageant contestant, Miss Nicaragua 2007
