= Toby Myles =

American football player (born 1975)

No. 70, 73
- Position: Offensive tackle

Personal information
- Born: July 23, 1975 (age 51); Jackson, Mississippi, U.S.
- Listed height: 6 ft 5 in (1.96 m)
- Listed weight: 320 lb (145 kg)

Career information
- High school: Callaway (Jackson)
- College: Mississippi State; Jackson State
- NFL draft: 1998: 5th round, 147th overall pick

Career history
- New York Giants (1998–1999); Oakland Raiders (2000); Cleveland Browns (2001); Oakland Raiders (2001)

Career NFL statistics
- Games played: 11
- Stats at Pro Football Reference

Tobiath L. Myles (born July 23, 1975) is an American former professional football player who was a tackle in the National Football League (NFL). He played for the New York Giants in 1999, and the Cleveland Browns and Oakland Raiders in 2001. After playing college football for the Mississippi State Bulldogs and Jackson State Tigers, he was selected in the fifth round of the 1998 NFL draft with the 147th overall pick.
