= Elijah Alexander =

American football player (1970–2010)

No. 59, 58, 50
- Position: Linebacker

Personal information
- Born: August 2, 1970; Fort Worth, Texas, U.S.
- Died: March 24, 2010 (aged 39); Dallas, Texas, U.S.
- Listed height: 6 ft 2 in (1.88 m)
- Listed weight: 235 lb (107 kg)

Career information
- High school: Fort Worth (TX) Dunbar
- College: Kansas State
- NFL draft: 1992: 10th round, 254th overall pick
- Expansion draft: 1999: 1st round, 12th overall pick

Career history
- Tampa Bay Buccaneers (1992); Denver Broncos (1993–1995); Indianapolis Colts (1996–1998); Cleveland Browns (1999)*; Oakland Raiders (2000–2001)
- * Offseason or practice squad member only

Career NFL statistics
- Tackles: 427
- Sacks: 6.5
- Forced fumbles: 5
- Interceptions: 5
- Stats at Pro Football Reference

Elijah Alfred Alexander III (August 2, 1970 – March 24, 2010) was an American professional football linebacker who played ten seasons in the National Football League (NFL) for the Tampa Bay Buccaneers, Denver Broncos, Indianapolis Colts and Oakland Raiders. In 2005, Alexander was diagnosed with multiple myeloma. In 2006, he founded the Tackle Myeloma Foundation, which raised funds to help find a cure and raise awareness about myeloma (since then shut down by his surviving wife).

== Early life ==
Alexander was born in Fort Worth, Texas on August 2, 1970, and later attended Dunbar High School. He played college football for Kansas State University. In his freshman season, the team finished with an 0–11 win–loss record. When he was a senior, the 1988 team won seven games, the school's most victories in a season since 1954. He registered 234 career tackles at Kansas State and appeared in the Senior Bowl in 1991.

== Professional career ==
The Tampa Bay Buccaneers selected Alexander in the tenth round of the 1992 NFL draft. He appeared in 12 games for the team that season. In 1993, the Denver Broncos claimed Alexander off of waivers from Tampa Bay. Alexander did not start in 1993, but he appeared in 16 games.

In 1994, Alexander started all 16 games and he registered a career-high 88 tackles and 24 assists. He played in only nine games in 1995 due to a shoulder injury. The next year with the Indianapolis Colts, he struggled with a hamstring injury at the beginning of the season but appeared in 14 games. In 1997, Alexander played in 13 games, starting eleven of them, and he collected 52 tackles. He spent two more seasons with the Colts, collecting 52 and 51 tackles, respectively. In his last two seasons, 2000 and 2001, Alexander started 29 games for the Oakland Raiders and registered a total of 90 tackles for the team.

== Illness and death ==
Alexander was diagnosed with multiple myeloma, a bone marrow cancer, in 2005. He had few symptoms, except for persistent pain in his feet, before his diagnosis. The disease was discovered after Alexander had bloodwork in Costa Rica while on a golfing vacation. He underwent chemotherapy and a bone marrow transplant. At one point, he lost nearly 60 pounds. He died at Medical City Hospital in Dallas on March 24, 2010.
