= Chuck Bresnahan =

American football player and coach (born 1960)

Biographical details
- Born: September 8, 1960 (age 66); Springfield, Massachusetts, U.S.

Playing career
- 1980–1982: Navy
- Position: Linebacker

Coaching career (HC unless noted)
- 1983: Navy (GA)
- 1986–1987: Navy (WR/TE/ST)
- 1988–1989: Georgia Tech (TE)
- 1989–1991: Georgia Tech (ILB)
- 1992–1993: Maine (DC/LB)
- 1994–1995: Cleveland Browns (LB/QC)
- 1996–1997: Indianapolis Colts (LB)
- 1998–1999: Oakland Raiders (DB)
- 2000–2003: Oakland Raiders (DC)
- 2004: Cincinnati Bengals (DA)
- 2005–2007: Cincinnati Bengals (DC)
- 2009: Florida Tuskers (LB)
- 2010: Florida Tuskers (DC)
- 2011: Oakland Raiders (DC)
- 2012: Sacramento Mountain Lions (DC)
- 2013–2014: USF (DC)
- 2015-2016: UCF (DC/LB)
- 2020: TSL Jousters
- 2023: Vegas Vipers (DL/OLB)

Charles Evans Bresnahan (pronounced "BREZ-nuh-han"; born September 8, 1960) is an American football coach and former player. He was the defensive coordinator of the Oakland Raiders on two occasions and the Cincinnati Bengals of the National Football League (NFL) as well as the Florida Tuskers and Sacramento Mountain Lions of the United Football League (UFL). He also served as defensive coordinator in the college ranks at the University of Central Florida, University of South Florida and University of Maine. Bresnahan also served as an assistant coach with the Cleveland Browns and Indianapolis Colts of the NFL and the United States Naval Academy (Navy) and the Georgia Institute of Technology (Georgia Tech) in the college ranks. Bresnahan also assisted in the Officiating Department of the NFL for 3 seasons. He is the son of Tom Bresnahan, a long time NFL assistant and Offensive Coordinator who coached 4 Super Bowls under Marv Levy (HOF-2001) with the Buffalo Bills.

== Coaching career ==
Bresnahan began his coaching career at Navy under Gary Tranquill in 1986. From 1987 to 1991 he was an assistant coach for the Georgia Tech Yellow Jackets football team that won the 1990 UPI National Championship under head coach Bobby Ross. He was hired by the Head Coach, Kirk Ferentz, to be the defensive coordinator for the Maine Black Bears from 1992 to 1993. In 1994 Bresnahan made the move to the NFL when he was hired by then Head Coach, Bill Belichick, as the assistant linebackers coach for the Cleveland Browns. He was promoted to linebackers coach in 1995. From 1996 to 1997 Bresnahan served as linebackers coach of the Indianapolis Colts. He was the Oakland Raiders' defensive backs coach from 1998 to 1999 before he was promoted by then Head Coach, Jon Gruden, to defensive coordinator and spent 2000 to 2003 in that role. During that time the Raiders won three consecutive AFC West Championships, appeared in two AFC Conference Championship games and Super Bowl XXXVII.

Bresnahan joined the Cincinnati Bengals' coaching staff in 2004 as a defensive assistant coach, and was promoted to defensive coordinator in 2005 by then Head Coach, Marvin Lewis. In 2005 the Bengals registered their first winning season and reached the NFL Playoffs for the first time in 17 years capturing the AFC North Championship. After the team went 7–9 in the 2008 regular season, he was fired and spent 2009 and 2010 as the linebackers coach and defensive coordinator, respectively, with the Florida Tuskers of the United Football League (UFL) where the Tuskers played in two consecutive UFL Championship games. In 2011 Bresnahan was hired back by the Oakland Raiders as their defensive coordinator. The team finished 8-8 but he was not retained following the season when Head Coach Hue Jackson was fired. Bresnahan spent the 2012 season with the Sacramento Mountain Lions as their defensive coordinator; he was later part of a joint lawsuit that sued the team for unpaid salary. In 2013 he was hired to serve as defensive coordinator, under newly hired head coach Willie Taggart, at the University of South Florida. After two seasons with the Bulls, he was fired along with the Offensive Coordinator Paul Wulff and assistant Coach, Ron Cooper. Bresnahan spent the 2015 season as the defensive coordinator of the University of Central Florida under head coach George O'Leary.

Bresnahan was hired by Dean Blandino, NFL Vice President of Officiating, in 2016 to help bring a coaching perspective to the NFL Officiating Department. Upon the departure of Blandino, he remained in this position under new NFL Vice President of Officiating, Al Riveron for the 2017 and 2018 seasons. Bresnahan then joined Pro Football Hall of Famer Bill Polian (HOF-2015) in his efforts to start the Alliance of American Football. He was the league's Assistant Director of Officiating and worked under Polian in Football Operations. He remained in this position until the Alliance declared Chapter 7 bankruptcy on April 2, 2019.

In May, 2019, he joined forces with a teammate at the United States Naval Academy and former lead pilot for the Navy's Blue Angels, John Foley. He was hired to help create and supervise the Sports Division of John Foley CenterPoint Companies, Inc serving as Vice President of Sports Division.

Bresnahan was named head coach of the Jousters of The Spring League in October 2020, but was relieved of his duties as head coach of the Jousters after week 3, due to a disagreement on how to handle a COVID-19 breakout within his team. He has since joined his former player and Pro Football Hall of Famer, Rod Woodson (HOF-2009), as Head Football Coach – Football Delivery & Strategy of HOPE Through Football. Bresnahan has also worked with multiple foundations, charities and developmental organizations such as Teammates for Kids, The Progeria Research Foundation, Boys & Girls Club of Oakland, CA, Football University and the Pro Football Hall of Fame Academy.

Bresnahan was officially hired by the Vegas Vipers on September 13, 2022 On January 1, 2024, it was announced the Vipers would not be a part of the UFL Merger.

== Personal life ==
Bresnahan attended and graduated from St. Mary's High School in Annapolis, Maryland.

He was a 1983 graduate of the United States Naval Academy in Annapolis, MD.

His father Tom Bresnahan, was a longtime football coach and spent sixteen years as an NFL assistant, including 10 seasons with the Buffalo Bills, where he coached in their four straight Super Bowl appearances under Pro Football Hall of Fame Coach, Marv Levy.
