= Tim Brown (American football) =

American football player (born 1966)

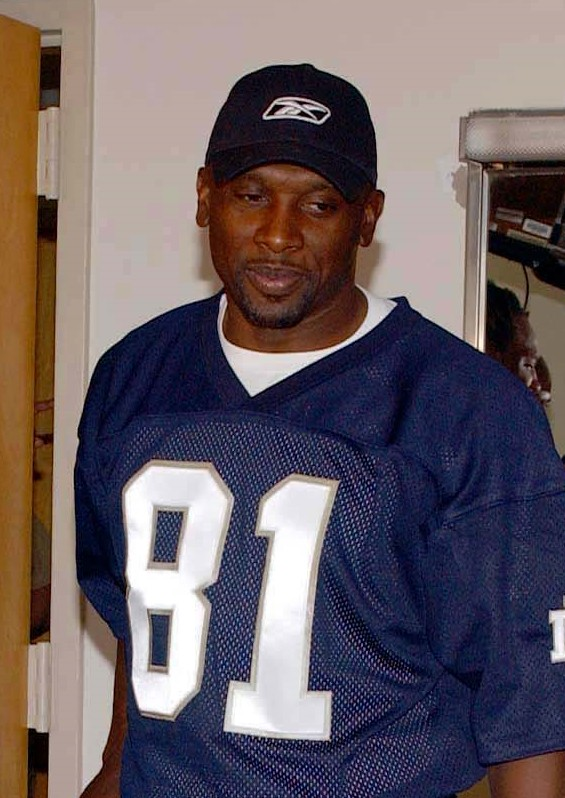
- Brown in 2005

No. 81
- Position: Wide receiver

Personal information
- Born: July 22, 1966 (age 60); Dallas, Texas, U.S.
- Listed height: 6 ft 0 in (1.83 m)
- Listed weight: 195 lb (88 kg)

Career information
- High school: Woodrow Wilson (Dallas)
- College: Notre Dame (1984–1987)
- NFL draft: 1988: 1st round, 6th overall pick

Career history

Playing
- Los Angeles / Oakland Raiders (1988–2003); Tampa Bay Buccaneers (2004)

Operations
- The Arena League (2023–present) Chairman and commissioner

Awards and highlights
- 2× First-team All-Pro (1988, 1997); 9× Pro Bowl (1988, 1991, 1993–1997, 1999, 2001); NFL receptions co-leader (1997); NFL kickoff return yards leader (1988); NFL punt return yards leader (1994); NFL 1990s All-Decade Team; PFWA All-Rookie Team (1988); Heisman Trophy (1987); Unanimous All-American (1987); First-team All-American (1986); Second-team AP All-Time All-American (2025); NFL record: Most consecutive starts by a receiver: 176 (Note: 185 including playoffs)

Career NFL statistics
- Receptions: 1,094
- Receiving yards: 14,934
- Receiving touchdowns: 100
- Return yards: 4,555
- Return touchdowns: 4
- Stats at Pro Football Reference
- Pro Football Hall of Fame
- College Football Hall of Fame

Timothy Donell Brown (born July 22, 1966) is an American former professional football player who was a wide receiver in the National Football League (NFL). He played college football for the Notre Dame Fighting Irish, where he won the Heisman Trophy, becoming the first wide receiver to do so. He spent sixteen years with the Los Angeles / Oakland Raiders, during which he established himself as one of the NFL's greatest wide receivers of all time. Brown also played for the Tampa Bay Buccaneers. In 2015, he was inducted into the Pro Football Hall of Fame.

As of 2023, Brown serves as the league chairman and commissioner of The Arena League, an indoor football league that began play in 2024.

== Early life ==
Timothy Donell Brown was born on July 22, 1966, in Dallas, Texas. He attended Woodrow Wilson High School in Dallas, the same school as 1938 Heisman Trophy winner Davey O'Brien. Brown's receipt of the 1987 Heisman Trophy gave Woodrow the distinction of being the first high school in the country to have produced two Heisman Trophy winners. Amazingly, Tim didn't play football as a freshman at Woodrow, because he was forbidden to do so by his mother. Instead, he played in the Woodrow band during that first year. But he joined the Woodrow football team as a sophomore, although he initially tried to hide that fact from his mom. She later found out about it when the band leader called his house asking why he was no longer at band practices. Despite his outstanding contributions to Woodrow's football program, the team fared poorly, posting only a 4–25–1 record over his three years as a starter. Nevertheless, Brown was heavily recruited by major colleges. His five official visits were to Notre Dame, Nebraska, Oklahoma, nearby SMU and Iowa. While at Woodrow, Brown also was a standout track athlete. He was one of the state's top performers in the 400-meter dash, with a PR of 47.14 seconds, and he cleared 7.42 meters in the long jump event.

== College career ==
Brown chose the University of Notre Dame and played there from 1984 to 1987, earning the nickname "Touchdown Timmy." In his first year, he set a freshman record with twenty-eight receptions. As a junior, he set a record with 1,937 all-purpose yards. Offensively he ran for 254 yards with 2 TD and caught 45 passes for 910 yards with 5 TD. During 1987, Brown caught 34 passes for 846 yards, returned 34 punts for 401 yards, rushed for 144 yards, gained 456 yards on 23 kickoff returns, and scored eight touchdowns. Brown finished his career at Notre Dame with 137 receptions for 2,493 yards, a school-record 5,024 all-purpose yards, and 22 touchdowns. However, just as in high school, Brown's team achieved limited success, with a 25–21 record over his four seasons, and an 0–2 record in bowl games. But in the year after Brown graduated (1988), Notre Dame won the national title.

Brown was named an All-American twice and won the 1987 Heisman Trophy, becoming the first pure wide receiver ever to win that award. As of 2020, Woodrow Wilson High School is still the only public high school with two Heisman Trophy winners.

When Brown graduated, he held 19 individual school records.

In 1989, Brown and Davey O'Brien were inducted together as members of the initial class of the Woodrow Wilson High School Hall of Fame, created in celebration of the school's 60th Anniversary.

In 2009, Brown was inducted into the College Football Hall of Fame.

In January 2012, Brown received the Silver Anniversary Award from the NCAA in recognition of his myriad athletic and professional accomplishments.

== Professional career ==
=== Los Angeles / Oakland Raiders ===
Pre-draft measurables
Height	Weight	Hand span	40-yard dash	10-yard split	20-yard split
6 ft 0 in (1.83 m)	193 lb (88 kg)	9 in (0.23 m)	4.39 s	1.59 s	2.58 s
All values from NFL Combine

Brown was selected by the Los Angeles Raiders in the first round with the sixth overall pick of the 1988 NFL draft. In his first NFL season, he led the league in kickoff returns, return yards, and yards per return average. Though it took time for him to fill into the role as the team's #1 receiver, catching just 147 passes in his first five seasons, he went on to rack up 9 consecutive 1,000-yard seasons from 1993 to 2001. He also led the NFL in punt returns in 1994, and receptions in 1997. In March 1994, Brown was offered and signed a free-agent offer-sheet with the Denver Broncos. The Raiders matched the offer soon thereafter. He was voted to the Pro Bowl nine times, in 1988 and 1991 as a kick returner, and in 1993–97, 1999 and 2001 as a receiver. In 2001, Brown would later play alongside another well-known wide receiver, Jerry Rice. On December 9, 2001, Brown returned a punt 88 yards for a touchdown in a home game against the Kansas City Chiefs, making him the oldest player in NFL history to score a touchdown on a punt return. In 2002, he passed Gene Upshaw to become the Raiders' all-time leader in games played with 224. He also set Raiders franchise records for receptions, receiving yards, and punt return yards. Brown was released by the Raiders before the 2004 season, as he did not want to accept a smaller role in the offense.

=== Tampa Bay Buccaneers ===
Brown was signed shortly thereafter by the Buccaneers (coached by former Raider head coach Jon Gruden). The move was controversial, considering that Brown had always been a fan favorite in the Oakland area and was much admired by many current and former Raiders players and staff over the sixteen years he spent with the Raider organization. He was the last of the Los Angeles Raiders to remain with Oakland.

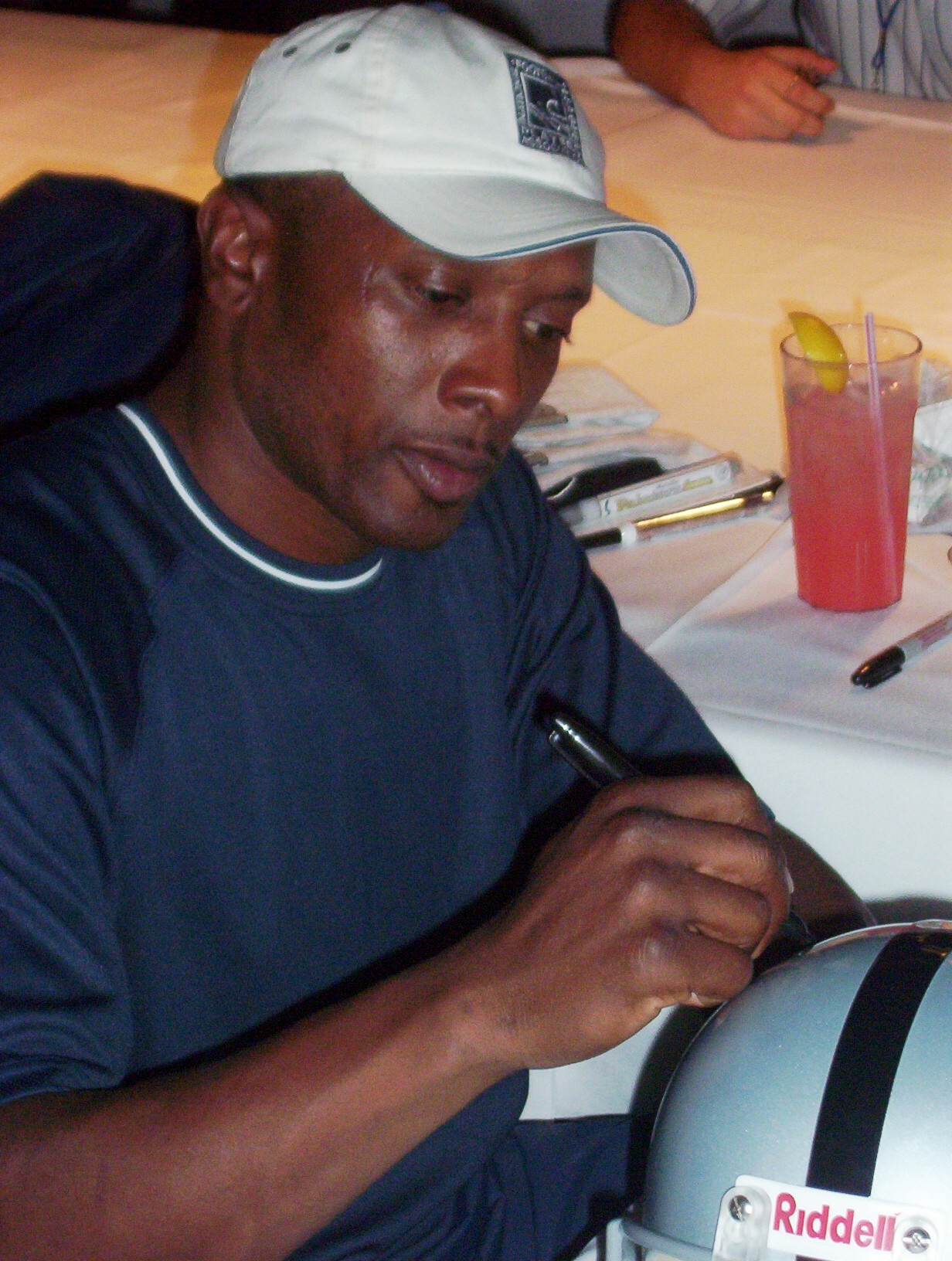
Brown at an autograph signing in 2004.

On September 27, 2004, in his first game at Oakland since being signed by Tampa Bay, Brown reached 100 career receiving touchdowns, tying him (with Steve Largent) for 3rd on the NFL's all-time career receiving touchdown list at that time (behind former teammate Jerry Rice [197] and Cris Carter [130]). He received a standing ovation from the Oakland Raider crowd.

In 2005, Brown signed a one-day contract with the Raiders to retire with the team. The July 18 news conference was attended by two Raiders officials and only one active Raider, wide receiver Jerry Porter. Brown retired with 14,934 receiving yards, the second-highest total in NFL history, 1,094 receptions (3rd), and 100 touchdown catches (3rd-Tied). Brown also gained 190 rushing yards, 3,320 punt-return yards (5th in NFL history), 3 fumble-return yards, and 1,235 yards returning kickoffs. This gave him a total of 19,682 combined net yards, ranking him #5 among the NFL's all-time leaders at the time of his retirement. He also scored 105 total touchdowns (100 receiving, 1 rushing, 3 punt returns, 1 kickoff return). Brown is the only player ever to retire in the NFL's top five leaders for both receiving and return yards.

Brown became eligible for enshrinement in the Pro Football Hall of Fame in 2010, but was not selected that year. He was considered a long shot to get in on his first try, as there was a logjam of accomplished receiver candidates, including Jerry Rice (Brown's former teammate), Cris Carter and Andre Reed.

On January 7, 2012, and again on January 11, 2013, Brown was selected as a finalist for enshrinement in the Pro Football Hall of Fame, but was not chosen.

On January 31, 2015, Brown was selected for enshrinement in the Pro Football Hall of Fame. He was inducted into the Pro Football Hall of Fame on August 8, 2015.

== NFL career statistics ==
Legend
	Led the league
**Bold**	Career high

=== Regular season ===
Year	Team	Games		Receiving					Rushing					Punt returns					Kickoff returns					Fumbles	
Year	Team	GP	GS	Rec	Yds	Avg	Lng	TD	Att	Yds	Avg	Lng	TD	Ret	Yds	Avg	Lng	TD	Ret	Yds	Avg	Lng	TD	Fum	Lost
1988	LA	16	9	43	725	**16.9**	65T	5	**14**	**50**	3.6	12	**1**	**49**	444	9.1	36	0	**41**	**1,098**	26.8	**97T**	**1**	5	1
1989	LA	1	1	1	8	8.0	8	0	—	—	—	—	—	4	43	10.8	29	0	3	63	21.0	25	0	1	1
1990	LA	16	0	18	265	14.7	51	3	—	—	—	—	—	34	295	8.7	39	0	—	—	—	—	—	3	3
1991	LA	16	1	36	554	15.4	78T	5	5	16	3.2	9	0	29	330	11.4	75T	**1**	1	29	**29.0**	29	0	1	0
1992	LA	15	12	49	693	14.1	68T	7	3	−4	−1.3	3	0	37	383	10.4	40	0	2	14	7.0	14	0	**6**	**5**
1993	LA	16	16	80	1,180	14.8	71T	7	2	7	3.5	14	0	40	465	11.6	74T	**1**	—	—	—	—	—	1	1
1994	LA	16	16	89	1,309	14.7	77T	9	—	—	—	—	—	40	**487**	12.2	48	0	—	—	—	—	—	3	3
1995	OAK	16	16	89	1,342	15.1	**80T**	10	—	—	—	—	—	36	364	10.1	38	0	—	—	—	—	—	0	0
1996	OAK	16	16	90	1,104	12.3	42T	9	6	35	5.8	15	0	32	272	8.5	36	0	1	24	24.0	24	0	3	1
1997	OAK	16	16	**104**	**1,408**	13.5	59T	5	5	19	3.8	12	0	—	—	—	—	—	1	7	7.0	7	0	1	1
1998	OAK	16	16	81	1,012	12.5	49T	9	1	−7	−7.0	−7	0	3	23	7.7	8	0	—	—	—	—	—	3	0
1999	OAK	16	16	90	1,344	14.9	47	6	1	4	4.0	4	0	—	—	—	—	—	—	—	—	—	—	0	0
2000	OAK	16	16	76	1,128	14.8	45	**11**	3	12	4.0	7	0	—	—	—	—	—	—	—	—	—	—	0	0
2001	OAK	16	16	91	1,165	12.8	46T	9	4	39	**9.8**	**19**	0	6	111	**18.5**	**88T**	**1**	—	—	—	—	—	1	1
2002	OAK	16	16	81	930	11.5	45	2	6	19	3.2	9	0	10	55	5.5	11	0	—	—	—	—	—	3	1
2003	OAK	16	15	52	567	10.9	36T	2	—	—	—	—	—	—	—	—	—	—	—	—	—	—	—	0	0
2004	TB	15	4	24	200	8.3	21	1	—	—	—	—	—	6	48	8.0	14	0	—	—	—	—	—	2	1
Career		255	202	1,094	14,934	13.7	80T	100	50	190	3.8	19	1	326	3,320	10.2	88T	3	49	1,235	25.2	97T	1	33	19

=== Postseason ===
Year	Team	Games		Receiving					Rushing					Punt returns					Kickoff returns					Fumbles	
Year	Team	GP	GS	Rec	Yds	Avg	Lng	TD	Att	Yds	Avg	Lng	TD	Ret	Yds	Avg	Lng	TD	Ret	Yds	Avg	Lng	TD	Fum	Lost
1990	LA	2	0	5	59	11.8	26	0	—	—	—	—	—	**4**	**45**	11.3	**17**	0	—	—	—	—	—	0	0
1991	LA	1	0	4	45	11.3	16	0	—	—	—	—	—	2	23	**11.5**	14	0	—	—	—	—	—	0	0
1993	LA	2	2	8	**213**	**26.6**	**86T**	**2**	—	—	—	—	—	3	7	2.3	6	0	—	—	—	—	—	0	0
2000	OAK	2	2	7	75	10.7	17	0	—	—	—	—	—	—	—	—	—	—	—	—	—	—	—	0	0
2001	OAK	2	2	8	55	6.9	19	1	**1**	**6**	**6.0**	**6**	0	—	—	—	—	—	**1**	**9**	**9.0**	**9**	0	0	0
2002	OAK	3	3	**13**	134	10.3	14	0	—	—	—	—	—	—	—	—	—	—	—	—	—	—	—	**1**	**1**
Career		12	9	45	581	12.9	86T	3	1	6	6.0	6	0	9	75	8.3	17	0	1	9	9.0	9	0	1	1

== Career highlights ==
=== Awards and honors ===
NFL

- 2× First-team All-Pro (1988, 1997)
- 9× Pro Bowl (1988, 1991, 1993–1997, 1999, 2001)
- NFL receptions co-leader (1997)
- NFL kickoff return yards leader (1988)
- NFL punt return yards leader (1994)
- NFL 1990s All-Decade Team
- PFWA All-Rookie Team (1988)

College

- Heisman Trophy (1987)
- Walter Camp Award (1987)
- SN Player of the Year (1987)
- UPI Player of the Year (1987)
- Unanimous All-American (1987)
- First-team All-American (1986)
- Second-team AP All-Time All-American (2025)

=== Records ===
- First pure wide receiver to win the Heisman Trophy.
- NFL rookie-season record for most combined yards gained, with 2,317 (1988).
- NFL record 10 consecutive seasons with at least 75 receptions
- NFL record for consecutive seasons with at least 5 touchdowns (11) – shared with Marvin Harrison, Don Hutson, Cris Carter, Terrell Owens, Frank Gore and Jerry Rice
- NFL record for being the oldest player ever to score a touchdown on special teams – (35 years, 140 days) 88-yard punt return
- NFL record for most consecutive games with two receptions (147 games, 1993–2002)
- NFL record for being the oldest player with 12+ receptions in a single game – (36 years, 97 days): 10/27/02 @ KC Chiefs, 13 receptions, 144 receiving yards
- NFL record for consecutive starts by a wide receiver: 176
- Only player to have 1,600 receiving yards against four different teams (Broncos, Chiefs, Chargers, Seahawks)
- Holds the following team records with the Los Angeles/Oakland Raiders
  - Touchdowns (104)
  - Receiving (14,734 yards, 1,070 receptions, 99 touchdowns)
  - Punt return (3,272 punt-return yards, 320 punt returns, 3 punt returns for touchdowns)
  - All-purpose yards (19,431)
  - Yards from scrimmage (14,924)

== Post-playing career ==
Brown was in the movie Little Giants, and is co-host on FSN Pro Football Preview with former players Jason Sehorn, Eddie George and NFL Insider Jay Glazer. Brown is also a representative for YorHealth.

In 1995, Brown became the National Chairman of Athletes & Entertainers for Kids and the related 9-1-1 for Kids. These efforts have helped over five million children and teens through mentoring and educational programs.

As of 2013, Brown has been the General Manager and Co-Owner of the Texas Revolution of the Champions Indoor Football League in his home state of Texas and was an analyst for ESPN College Football. Brown also hosts a weekly sports-talk show on WRDI.

Brown serves as the League Chairman and Commissioner of The Arena League, an indoor football league that is estimated to begin play in 2024.

Brown currently lives in Cedar Hill, Texas.

== NASCAR ==
Brown started a NASCAR racing team as part of their Drive for Diversity program. He was recruiting African American sponsors to fund the venture, and has worked out a technical alliance with Roush Fenway Racing, who will provide support to the upstart team. Brown hopes to eventually find a black, Hispanic, or woman driver to be the star of his team in order to bring an element of diversity to what is a white-dominated sport. However, the plan never successfully began.

== Relationship with Raiders owner Al Davis ==
Since joining the Raiders, Brown had a complicated relationship with the Oakland Raiders and late owner Al Davis. During a 2009 interview with Sportsradiointerview.com Brown commented on his former boss:

“Meeting Al (Davis) was pretty unique. I found out five or ten minutes after my first practice there that he hated African-American athletes from Notre Dame. And they literally told me that. They literally told me that because we’re known for using our education more than our athletic ability that he thought that I would be one of these guys that would basically take the money and run. I don’t know if that was a ploy to get me amped up, but it certainly worked."

In 2000, Brown was dining in an Oakland restaurant with former Raiders Chester McGlockton and Sean Jones. During their meal, Brown found himself unable to approach or speak to Davis. Brown told a reporter, "I was saddened by that because I don't know anybody who I've dealt with for twelve years who I can't say hello to in that situation. I was saddened that the situation is where it is."

On August 5, 2004, the Raiders held a press conference with Brown and Davis which stated that Brown was leaving the Raiders. Davis and Brown professed mutual respect for one another and both men expressed a desire for Brown to return to the Raiders someday.

On July 19, 2005, Brown officially retired but the Raiders did not hold a press conference at the team headquarters. Instead, Brown held his own press conference in an Oakland hotel ballroom. Davis did not attend the conference because he had a "scheduling conflict". Davis did allow Brown to sign a ceremonial $765,000 contract with the Raiders so he could retire as an Oakland Raider. Brown's 2004 departure from the Raiders eventually became acrimonious, and the outspoken receiver often criticized Davis, senior assistant Michael Lombardi and coach Norv Turner publicly for conspiring to make him expendable. Former teammates Marcus Allen, Lincoln Kennedy and Chester McGlockton attended the press conference. For the Raiders, Amy Trask, the Raiders' chief executive officer who had Brown sign the ceremonial contract, Marc Badain, a finance executive and Mike Taylor, the team's director of public relations, were on hand. At the time, Raiders receiver Jerry Porter was also in attendance. Lincoln Kennedy stuck up for the absence of Davis stating "It's not his style; he'll probably invite Tim up to his office, or out to dinner later on. But this? This is not his style."

Recent history suggested that Davis was possibly out of touch with the football world prior to his death in 2011 because the Raiders had suffered through seven straight losing seasons (2003–2009) since losing to Tampa Bay in Super Bowl XXXVII. Brown disagreed, stating "In a lot of peoples’ minds, Al is out of touch, but nothing is further from the truth. He is still quite lucid."
