= Randy Jordan =

American football player and coach (born 1970)

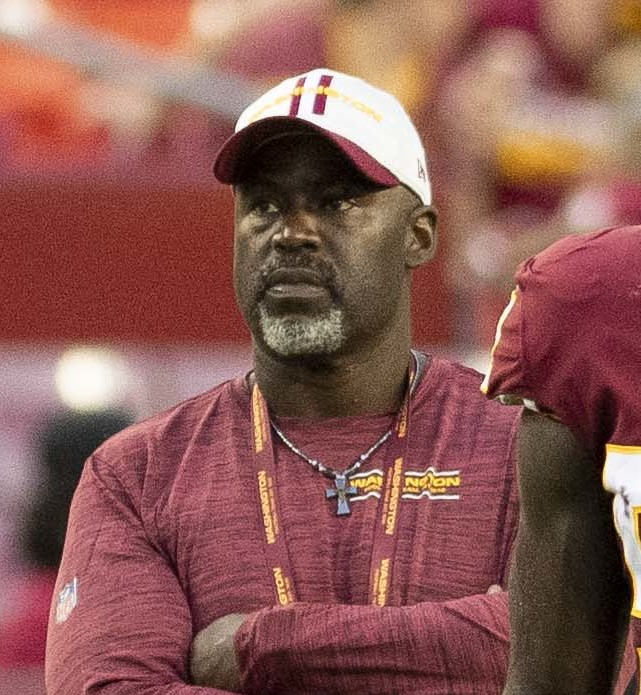
- Jordan with the Washington Football Team in 2021

Tennessee Titans
- Title: Running backs coach

Personal information
- Born: June 6, 1970 (age 56); Manson, North Carolina, U.S.
- Listed height: 5 ft 10 in (1.78 m)
- Listed weight: 220 lb (100 kg)

Career information
- Position: Running back (No. 23, 28)
- High school: Warren County (NC)
- College: North Carolina (1989-1992)
- NFL draft: 1993: undrafted

Career history

Playing
- Los Angeles Raiders (1993); Jacksonville Jaguars (1995–1997); Oakland Raiders (1998–2002)

Coaching
- Oakland Raiders (2003) Assistant special teams coach; Nebraska (2004–2007) Running backs coach; Texas A&M (2008–2011) Running backs coach; North Carolina (2012–2013) Running backs coach; Washington Redskins / Football Team / Commanders (2014–2022) Running backs coach; Washington Commanders (2023) Senior offensive assistant/running backs coach; Tennessee Titans (2024–present) Running backs coach

Career NFL statistics
- Rushing yards: 574
- Rushing average: 3.8
- Receptions: 58
- Receiving yards: 596
- Total touchdowns: 10
- Stats at Pro Football Reference

Randy Loment Jordan (born June 6, 1970) is an American football coach and former player who is the running backs coach for the Tennessee Titans of the National Football League (NFL). He played college football for the University of North Carolina. He was not selected in the 1993 NFL draft, and subsequently played nine seasons for the Los Angeles Raiders, Jacksonville Jaguars, and Oakland Raiders.

Jordan attended the University of North Carolina, where he was a running back for Mack Brown's North Carolina Tarheels football team, playing alongside fellow running back and future Jacksonville teammate Natrone Means. As a junior in 1991, he had 124 carries for 618 yards with seven rushing touchdowns, and 11 catches for 160 yards with two touchdown receptions. During his 1992 senior season, Jordan had 59 carries for 225 yards with one touchdown, and seven receptions for 101 yards and a touchdown.

Pre-draft measurables
Height	Weight	Arm length	Hand span	40-yard dash	10-yard split	20-yard split	20-yard shuttle	Vertical jump	Broad jump	Bench press
5 ft 10 in (1.78 m)	208 lb (94 kg)	30 3/8 in (0.77 m)	8 1/4 in (0.21 m)	4.46 s	1.57 s	2.62 s	4.20 s	35.0 in (0.89 m)	9 ft 11 in (3.02 m)	15 reps
All values from NFL Combine

He scored the first touchdown of the expansion Jacksonville Jaguars in 1995.

Jordan was also an All-American sprinter for the North Carolina Tar Heels track and field team, placing 4th in the 55 m at the 1993 NCAA Division I Indoor Track and Field Championships.

== Coaching career ==
=== UNC ===
Jordan returned to his alma mater after Tar Heels head coach Larry Fedora announced his hiring as the team's new running back coach in January 2012. In his first season, he coached Giovani Bernard, who would have a 1000+ rushing yards that year along with being drafted in second round of the 2013 NFL draft.

=== Washington Redskins / Football Team / Commanders ===
On January 26, 2014, Jordan was hired by the Washington Redskins, as their running backs coach under head coach Jay Gruden. Following the 2019 season and the firing of Gruden, new head coach Ron Rivera chose to retain him on his initial coaching staff. In September 2023, he was promoted and given a senior offensive assistant title. Following the end of the 2023 season, he was not retained under new head coach Dan Quinn.

=== Tennessee Titans ===
On February 13, 2024, Jordan was hired by the Tennessee Titans as their running backs coach under head coach Brian Callahan.

Following the firing of Callahan and the end of the 2025 season, new head coach Robert Saleh chose to keep Jordan on his staff.
