= Bob Casullo =

American football coach

Biographical details
- Born: March 21, 1951 (age 75); Little Falls, New York, U.S.
- Education: Brockport State University 1970-1973 Bachelors Degree Syracuse University Masters Degree

Coaching career (HC unless noted)
- 1985–1994: Syracuse (assistant)
- 1995–1998: Georgia Tech (assistant)
- 1999: Michigan State (assistant)
- 2000–2003: Oakland Raiders (special teams)
- 2004: New York Jets (TE)
- 2005: Seattle Seahawks (special teams)
- 2007–2008: Tampa Bay Buccaneers (TE)
- 2009–2010: Syracuse (assistant head coach & special teams coordinator)

Accomplishments and honors

Championships
- 2 Super Bowl appearances

Awards
- 1973 All American status at Fullback for Brockport State University

Bob Casullo (born March 21, 1951) is a former National Football League (NFL) and college coach. He started his NFL career in 2000 coaching special teams for the Raiders. Casullo was most recently the assistant head coach and special teams coordinator for Syracuse University but left that position in November 2010, one week before the team's final regular season game.

== Early life ==
Casullo attended Little Falls High School where he was a three-sport athlete for the Mounties. He was a captain for all three (football, basketball and baseball) teams. After starring at quarterback in high school, Casullo went on to a career as Fullback for the Brockport State University football team in New York, earning honorable mention All-America honors his senior season.

== Coaching career ==
=== Raiders ===
Casullo's special teams unit helped the Raiders to three consecutive AFC West titles (2000–2002) including an appearance in Super Bowl XXXVII. In 2000, his unit led the whole of the NFL in net punting average. In 2001, they led the AFC sending their punter to the Pro Bowl. That year, he also produced an outstanding kickoff coverage unit (best in the NFL), that kept opponents less than 20 yards from their own end zone 17 times. In his final year with the Raiders he produced a unit that was third in the NFL in punt return average.

=== Jets ===
During his 2004 season with the New York Jets as tight ends coach, Curtis Martin won the NFL Rushing title (by 1 yard).

=== Seahawks ===
Casullo began working with the Seahawks in 2005. The special teams were plagued by injuries and saw a rotation of injury replacements. Casullo had lost former Special Teams Pro Bowler Alex Bannister to a broken collar bone. There were also miscues, including several fumbles on kick and punt returns. Blown coverages allowed a kick return for a touchdown in St. Louis versus the Rams, and a punt return for a touchdown by Steve Smith in the NFC Championship game threatened to doom the Seahawks' season. But converted safety Jordan Babineaux forced a fumble on special teams which was recovered by long snapper J. P. Darche to seal the victory in St. Louis. Josh Brown, who provided his share of game-winning kicks, ultimately tied a franchise record of 8 50+ yard field goals and earned an invite as a Pro Bowl alternate.

=== Buccaneers ===
On January 19, 2007, Casullo was hired by coach John Gruden as the tight ends coach for the Tampa Bay Buccaneers, replacing the departing Ron Middleton.

=== Syracuse ===
On Friday, February 13, 2009, Syracuse University announced that Casullo had been hired as Syracuse University's assistant head coach for football.

On November 22, 2010, Syracuse Head Coach Doug Marrone whom was coached by Casullo at Syracuse has announced that Casullo was no longer a part of the coaching staff.
