= Mondriel Fulcher =

American football player (born 1976)

No. 89
- Position: Tight end

Personal information
- Born: October 15, 1976 (age 50); Coffeyville, Kansas, U.S.
- Listed height: 6 ft 3 in (1.91 m)
- Listed weight: 250 lb (113 kg)

Career information
- High school: Field Kindley (Coffeyville)
- College: Miami (FL) (1995–1999)
- NFL draft: 2000: 7th round, 227th overall pick

Career history
- Oakland Raiders (2000–2003)
- Stats at Pro Football Reference

Mondriel DeCarlos A. Fulcher (born October 15, 1976) is an American former professional football tight end who played three seasons with the Oakland Raiders of the National Football League (NFL). He was selected by the Raiders in the seventh round of the 2000 NFL draft after playing college football at the University of Miami.

== Early life and college ==
Mondriel DeCarlos A. Fulcher was born on October 15, 1976, in Coffeyville, Kansas. He attended Field Kindley High School in Coffeyville.

Fulcher redshirted for the Miami Hurricanes in 1995 and was a four-year letterman from 1996 to 1999. He caught 11 passes for 138 yards and two touchdowns in 1996, five passes for 87 yards in 1997, 17 passes for 289 yards and one touchdown in 1998, and 13 passes for 131 yards and one touchdown in 1999.

== Professional career ==
Fulcher was selected by the Oakland Raiders in the seventh round, with the 227th overall pick, of the 2000 NFL draft. He officially signed with the team on July 11. He played in ten games during his rookie year in 2000, recording five solo tackles. Fulcher appeared in 13 games, starting one, in 2001, and was targeted once on offense while also making seven solo tackles and one assisted tackle. He also appeared in two playoff games that season, totaling two solo tackles, one assisted tackle, and one forced fumble. He played in two games for the Raiders in 2002, being targeted once on offense and posting one solo tackle, before being placed on injured reserve on September 26, 2002. The next year, Fulcher was placed on injured reserve again on July 25, 2003, and spent the entire season there. He became a free agent in March 2004.
