= Eric Johnson (defensive back, born 1976) =

American football player (born 1976)

Profile
- Position: Linebacker

Personal information
- Born: April 30, 1976 (age 50); Carson, California, U.S.
- Listed height: 6 ft 0 in (1.83 m)
- Listed weight: 241 lb (109 kg)

Career information
- College: Nebraska
- NFL draft: 2000: undrafted

Career history
- Oakland Raiders (2000–2003); Atlanta Falcons (2004); Arizona Cardinals (2005); Georgia Force (2007–2008)

Awards and highlights
- National champion (1997)
- Stats at Pro Football Reference

Eric Duane Johnson (born April 30, 1976) is an American former professional football player who was a linebacker in the National Football League (NFL). He played college football for the Nebraska Cornhuskers

== College career ==
Johnson played linebacker at the University of Nebraska–Lincoln.

== Professional career ==
=== NFL ===
Pre-draft measurables
Height	Weight	Arm length	Hand span	40-yard dash	10-yard split	20-yard split	20-yard shuttle	Three-cone drill	Vertical jump	Broad jump	Bench press
6 ft 0 in (1.83 m)	215 lb (98 kg)	31 1/4 in (0.79 m)	10 in (0.25 m)	4.48 s	1.50 s	2.59 s	4.17 s	6.96 s	38.0 in (0.97 m)	10 ft 1 in (3.07 m)	12 reps
All values from NFL Combine

Johnson played linebacker for eight seasons (2000–2007) for the Oakland Raiders, the Atlanta Falcons, and the Arizona Cardinals, in the National Football League. Johnson is best known for blocking a punt and returning it for a touchdown in Super Bowl XXXVII, which the Raiders lost 48–21 to the Tampa Bay Buccaneers.

=== AFL ===
Johnson was signed as a free agent by the Georgia Force on February 19, 2007. He was re-signed by the Force on June 2, 2009.

== Human trafficking case ==
In February 2023, Johnson, along with seven other alleged gang members, were arrested in Gwinnett County, Georgia as part of what the Attorney General of Georgia called a "major human trafficking and gang case;" he pled guilty in August 2025 and was sentenced a month later to 10 years in prison followed by 10 years of strict probation.
