= Marquez Pope =

American football player (born 1970)

safety

Marquez Phillips Pope (born October 29, 1970) is an American former professional football player who was a cornerback in the National Football League (NFL). He played college football for the Fresno State Bulldogs and was selected by the San Diego Chargers in the second round of the 1992 NFL draft with the 33rd overall pick. Pope played for five teams in 10 NFL seasons from 1992 to 2001. His best year as a pro came during the 1996 season for the San Francisco 49ers, intercepting 6 passes with 1 touchdown. During his pro career, Pope was known to be among the hardest hitters in the NFL.

Pope is the only National Football League player in history to play on all four California NFL teams (Chargers, Rams, 49ers, Raiders). He also inspired the Marquez Pope rule, which states that a fumble recovered by a defensive player will be spotted at the spot of the recovery, not where the player's momentum leads him. This occurred because in 2000, Pope recovered a fumble by Seahawk Ricky Watters, but a rainy field at Husky Stadium in Seattle caused him to slide into his own end zone with the ball, which led to a safety for the Seahawks. In 2008, he was inducted into the Polytechnic Hall of Fame.
