= Bobby Brooks (linebacker) =

American football player (born 1976)

Profile
- Position: Linebacker

Personal information
- Born: March 3, 1976 (age 50); Vallejo, California, U.S.

Career information
- College: Fresno State

Career history
- 1999-2001: Oakland Raiders
- 2002: Jacksonville Jaguars
- 2004: Oakland Raiders*
- 2004-2005: Cologne Centurions
- 2006: Hamilton Tiger-Cats
- * Offseason or practice squad member only
- Stats at Pro Football Reference

Bobby Brooks (born March 3, 1976) is an American former professional football player who was a linebacker for three seasons with the Oakland Raiders and Jacksonville Jaguars of the National Football League (NFL). He played college football for the Fresno State Bulldogs. He also played professionally in NFL Europe and the Canadian Football League (CFL).
