= 2001 NFL season =

American football season

Regular season
- Duration: September 9, 2001 – January 7, 2002
- In the wake of the September 11 attacks, a number of games were re-scheduled.

Playoffs
- Start date: January 12, 2002
- AFC Champions: New England Patriots
- NFC Champions: St. Louis Rams

Super Bowl XXXVI
- Date: February 3, 2002
- Site: Louisiana Superdome, New Orleans, Louisiana
- Champions: New England Patriots

Pro Bowl
- Date: February 9, 2002
- Site: Aloha Stadium

AFC teams: West, Central, East
NFC teams: West, Central, East

The 2001 NFL season was the 82nd regular season of the National Football League (NFL), and the first season of the 21st century. The league permanently moved the first week of the regular season to the weekend following Labor Day. In the wake of the September 11 attacks, the NFL's week 2 games (September 16 and 17) were postponed and rescheduled to the weekend of January 6 and 7, 2002. To retain the full playoff format, all playoff games, including Super Bowl XXXVI, were rescheduled one week later. The New England Patriots won the Super Bowl, defeating the St. Louis Rams 20–17 at the Louisiana Superdome.

This was the last season with 31 teams as the Houston Texans were introduced as an expansion team the following season. It was also the final season to feature the AFC Central and NFC Central divisions, as they were realigned into the AFC North, AFC South, NFC North, and NFC South the following season. It also was (to date) the last time the regular NFL season was interrupted as many games were pushed to the next week following the September 11, 2001 attacks.

== Player movement ==
=== Transactions ===
- July 27: The San Francisco 49ers sign quarterback Ricky Ray. Ray would go on to a career in the Canadian Football League.

=== Trades ===
- July 20: The New Orleans Saints trade Robert Arnaud to Washington.

=== Retirements ===
- April 9, 2001: Three-time Super Bowl champion Troy Aikman announces his retirement, after failing to find another team.
- After the 2000 season, defensive end Reggie White retired after spending his last season in Carolina.
- After the 2000 season, Eddie Murray, who had played in 3 stints (1980–1995, 1997, 1999–2000) and Irving Fryar, who entered the NFL in 1984, decided they had played their final NFL games in Washington.
- Warren Moon and Al Del Greco, two players who entered the NFL in 1984, retired after spending their last seasons in Kansas City and Tennessee, respectively.
- Jessie Tuggle, who entered the NFL in 1987, retired after spending all 14 of his seasons with the Falcons.

=== Draft ===
The 2001 NFL draft was held from April 21 to 22, 2001, at New York City's Theater at Madison Square Garden. With the first pick, the Atlanta Falcons selected quarterback Michael Vick from Virginia Tech.

== Officiating changes ==
Mike Pereira became the league's director of officiating, succeeding Jerry Seeman, who had served the role since 1991. Pereira was a side judge in 1996 and 1997 before joining the league office, where he was groomed as Seeman's successor over the next three seasons.

Bill Leavy and Terry McAulay were promoted to referee. Phil Luckett returned to back judge, while another officiating crew was added in 2001 in preparation for the Houston Texans expansion team, the league's 32nd franchise, in 2002.

Due to labor dispute, the regular NFL officials were locked out prior to the final week of the preseason. Replacement officials who had worked in college football or the Arena Football League officiated NFL games during the last preseason week and the first week of the regular season. A deal was eventually reached before play resumed after the September 11 attacks.

== Major rule changes ==
- Fumble recoveries will be awarded at the spot of the recovery, not where the player's momentum carries him. This change was passed in response to two regular season games in 2000, Atlanta Falcons–Carolina Panthers and Oakland Raiders–Seattle Seahawks, in which a safety was awarded when a defensive player's momentum in recovering a fumble carried him into his own end zone.
- Taunting rules and roughing the passer will be strictly enforced.

== 2001 deaths ==
- Jim Benton: A member of the National Football League 1940s All-Decade Team, Benton died on March 28, 2001
- Don Boll: A draft pick of the Washington Redskins, Boll died on December 29, 2001.
- Jim Cain: A member of the Detroit Lions team that won the 1953 NFL Championship Game
- Sam Claphan: Chargers tight end from 1980 to 1987, Claphan died on November 26, 2001.
- Neal Colzie: Defensive back for the Oakland Raiders and Tampa Bay Buccaneers, Colzie died on August 20, 2001.
- L.G. Dupre: Part of the 1958 NFL Championship Game against the New York Giants, he died after a lengthy battle with cancer on August 9, 2001.
- Dan Edwards: Drafted by the Pittsburgh Steelers in the 1st round (9th overall) of the 1948 NFL draft, Edwards died on August 7, 2001.
- Homer Elias: Lions guard from 1978 to 1984, he died of a heart attack on October 3, 2001.
- Bob Gaona: NFL offensive lineman who also played defense and special teams, he died on May 23, 2001.
- Hank Gremminger: Defensive back for the Packers from 1956 to 1965 and the Los Angeles Rams in 1966, he died of cardiac arrest on November 2, 2001.
- Harvey Martin: The co-MVP of Super Bowl XII, he died of pancreatic cancer on December 24, 2001. Martin was the first Super Bowl MVP to pass away.
- Dan Nugent: Redskins guard from 1976 to 1980, Nugent died on October 18, 2001.
- Dwayne O'Steen: Part of the Oakland Raiders Super Bowl XV winning team, O'Steen died on September 21, 2001, of an apparent heart attack.
- Don Paul: was selected to four Pro Bowls, one as a member of the Cardinals and three as a member of the Browns died on September 7, 2001.
- Pete Perreault: A member of the 1968 Cincinnati Bengals season, their inaugural season, Perreault died on December 8, 2001)
- Dick Rehbein: Longtime NFL coach who had become Patriots quarterbacks coach in 2000, Rehbein died of cardiomyopathy on August 6, 2001.
- Bo Roberson: Roberson caught three passes for eighty-eight yards in the Bills' 23–0 defeat of the Chargers in the 1965 American Football League Championship Game. He died on April 15, 2001.
- Tony Samuels: Drafted by the Kansas City Chiefs in the fourth round of the 1977 NFL draft, Samuels died on September 12, 2001.
- Paul Seiler: Former player for the New York Jets and Oakland Raiders, he died of colon cancer on September 25, 2001.
- Billy Ray Smith Sr.: A member of the Baltimore Colts teams that participated in Super Bowl III and Super Bowl V, he died from cancer on March 23, 2001. His son, Billy Ray Smith Jr., was a linebacker for the San Diego Chargers from 1983 to 1992.
- Korey Stringer: Tackle for the Minnesota Vikings died from a heat stroke August 1, 2001, during training camp. The Vikings wore a 77 patch on their jerseys to commemorate Stringer. His number 77 was retired by the Vikings on November 19 during a Monday night game against the New York Giants.

== Notable retirements ==
- Robert Smith
- Troy Aikman
- Andre Reed
- Thurman Thomas
- Jim Harbaugh
- Warren Moon
- Jessie Tuggle
- George Koonce
- Bryce Paup
- Mike Tomczak
- Ben Coates
- Bruce Armstrong
- Cornelius Bennett
- Chris Howard
- Errict Rhett
- Andre Rison
- Stoney Case
- Ken Norton Jr.
- Kimble Anders
- Dermontti Dawson
- Tim Grunhard
- Barry Minter
- Irving Fryar
- Napoleon Kaufman
- Alfred Pupunu
- Reggie White
- Courtney Hawkins
- Natrone Means
- Eric Swann
- Curtis Enis
- Al Del Greco

== Regular season ==
Following a pattern set in 1999, the first week of the season was permanently moved to the weekend following Labor Day. With Super Bowls XXXVI–XXXVII already scheduled for fixed dates, the league initially decided to eliminate the Super Bowl bye weeks for 2001 and 2002 to adjust.

In the wake of the September 11 attacks, the games originally scheduled for September 16 and 17 were postponed and rescheduled to the weekend of January 6 and 7. To retain the full playoff format, all playoff games, including the Super Bowl, were rescheduled one week later. The season-ending Pro Bowl was also moved to one week later. This was the last season in which each conference had three divisions, as the conferences would be realigned to four divisions for the 2002 NFL season.

Canceling the games scheduled for September 16 and 17 was considered and rejected since it would have canceled a home game for about half the teams (15 of 31). It would have also resulted in an unequal number of games played: September 16 and 17 was to have been a bye for the San Diego Chargers, so that team would still have played 16 games that season and each of the other teams would have played only 15 games (the Chargers ultimately finished 5–11, making any competitive advantages to playing an extra game irrelevant).

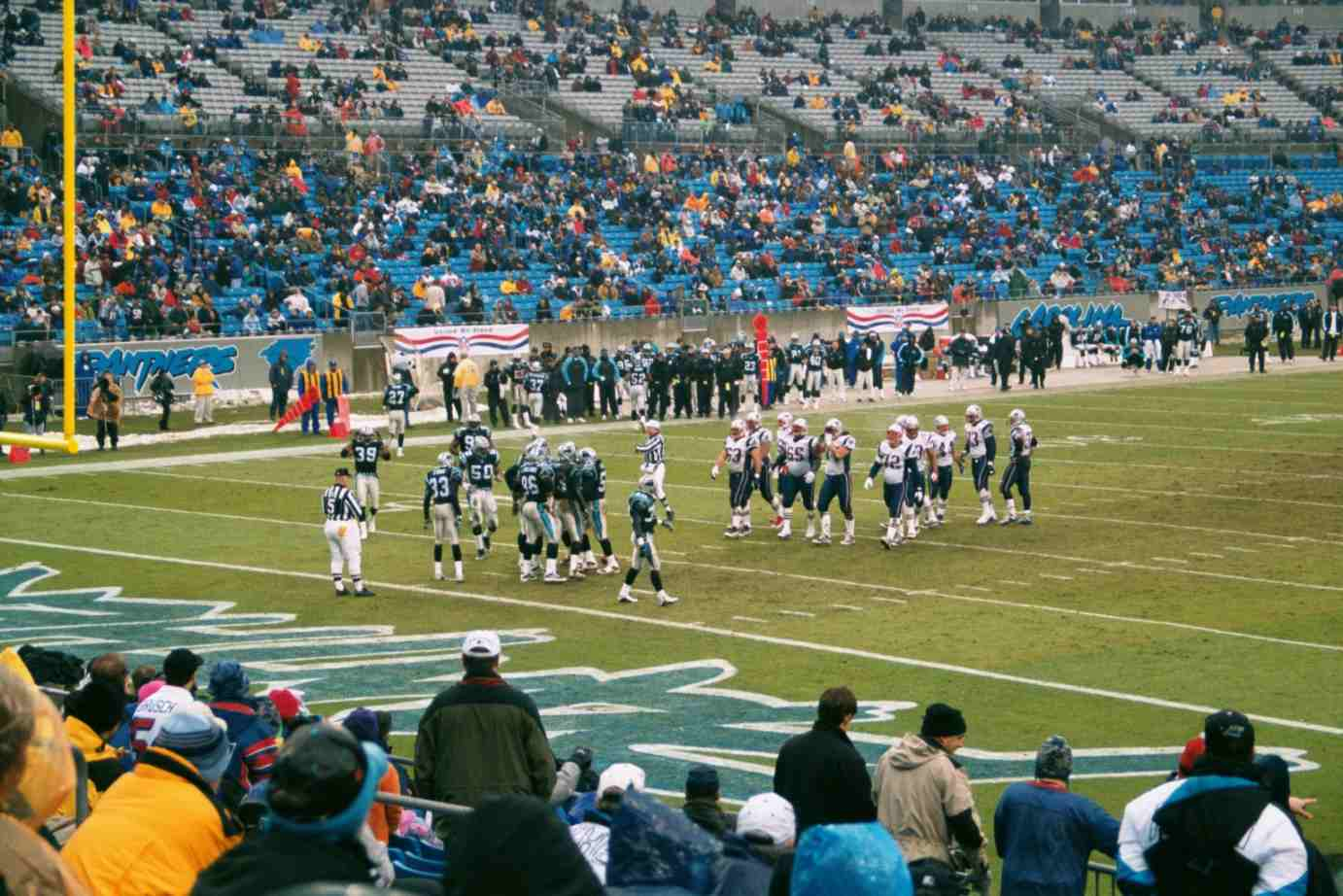
New England at Carolina in week 17, January 6, 2002

As a result of rescheduling Week 2 as Week 17, the Pittsburgh Steelers ended up not playing a home game for the entire month of September (their only home game during that month was originally scheduled for September 16). The ESPN Sunday Night Football game for that week was also changed. It was originally scheduled to be Cleveland at Pittsburgh, but it was replaced with Philadelphia at Tampa Bay, which was seen as a more interesting matchup. Ironically, the Eagles and Buccaneers would both rest their starters that night, and would meet one week later in the playoffs. In recognition of this, when NBC began airing Sunday Night Football in 2006, there would be no game initially scheduled for Weeks 11 to 17 – a game initially scheduled in the afternoon would be moved to the primetime slot, without stripping any teams of a primetime appearance. This way of "flexible scheduling" would not be used at all in 2007, and since 2008, it is only used in the final week, except for the 2017 season, when no primetime game was scheduled for Week 17 due to that Sunday falling on New Year's Eve.

The games that eventually made up Week 17 marked the latest regular season games to be played during what is traditionally defined as the "NFL season" (under the format at the time, the regular season could not end later than January 3 in any given year; this changed in 2021, as the NFL expanded to 17 games with the end of the regular season pushed back one week as a result; the 2021 regular season ended on January 9, and under the new format, the latest the regular season could end is January 10).

Another scheduling change took place in October, when the Dallas at Oakland game was moved from October 21 to 7 to accommodate a possible Oakland Athletics home playoff game on October 21. The rescheduling ended up being unnecessary as the Athletics would not make it past the Division Series round.

=== Scheduling formula ===
Inter-conference
AFC East vs NFC West
AFC Central vs NFC Central
AFC West vs NFC East

- Thanksgiving: Two games were played on Thursday, November 22, featuring Green Bay at Detroit and Denver at Dallas, with Green Bay and Denver winning.

== Final regular season standings ==
AFC East
	W	L	T	PCT	PF	PA	STK
^{(2)} New England Patriots	11	5	0	.688	371	272	W6
^{(4)} Miami Dolphins	11	5	0	.688	344	290	W2
^{(6)} New York Jets	10	6	0	.625	308	295	W1
Indianapolis Colts	6	10	0	.375	413	486	W1
Buffalo Bills	3	13	0	.188	265	420	L1

AFC Central
	W	L	T	PCT	PF	PA	STK
^{(1)} Pittsburgh Steelers	13	3	0	.813	352	212	W1
^{(5)} Baltimore Ravens	10	6	0	.625	303	265	W1
Cleveland Browns	7	9	0	.438	285	319	L1
Tennessee Titans	7	9	0	.438	336	388	L2
Jacksonville Jaguars	6	10	0	.375	294	286	L2
Cincinnati Bengals	6	10	0	.375	226	309	W2

AFC West
	W	L	T	PCT	PF	PA	STK
^{(3)} Oakland Raiders	10	6	0	.625	399	327	L3
Seattle Seahawks	9	7	0	.563	301	324	W2
Denver Broncos	8	8	0	.500	340	339	L1
Kansas City Chiefs	6	10	0	.375	320	344	L1
San Diego Chargers	5	11	0	.313	332	321	L9

NFC East
	W	L	T	PCT	PF	PA	STK
^{(3)} Philadelphia Eagles	11	5	0	.688	343	208	W2
Washington Redskins	8	8	0	.500	256	303	W2
New York Giants	7	9	0	.438	294	321	L2
Arizona Cardinals	7	9	0	.438	295	343	L1
Dallas Cowboys	5	11	0	.313	246	338	L1

NFC Central
	W	L	T	PCT	PF	PA	STK
^{(2)} Chicago Bears	13	3	0	.813	338	203	W4
^{(4)} Green Bay Packers	12	4	0	.750	390	266	W3
^{(6)} Tampa Bay Buccaneers	9	7	0	.563	324	280	L1
Minnesota Vikings	5	11	0	.313	290	390	L4
Detroit Lions	2	14	0	.125	270	424	W1

NFC West
	W	L	T	PCT	PF	PA	STK
^{(1)} St. Louis Rams	14	2	0	.875	503	273	W6
^{(5)} San Francisco 49ers	12	4	0	.750	409	282	W1
New Orleans Saints	7	9	0	.438	333	409	L4
Atlanta Falcons	7	9	0	.438	291	377	L2
Carolina Panthers	1	15	0	.063	253	410	L15

=== Tiebreakers ===
- New England finished ahead of Miami in the AFC East based on better division record (6–2 to Dolphins' 5–3).
- Cleveland finished ahead of Tennessee in the AFC Central based on better division record (5–5 to Titans' 3–7).
- Jacksonville finished ahead of Cincinnati in the AFC Central based on head-to-head sweep (2–0).
- N.Y. Giants finished ahead of Arizona in the NFC East based on head-to-head sweep (2–0).
- New Orleans finished ahead of Atlanta in the NFC West based on better division record (4–4 to Falcons' 3–5).
- Baltimore was the second AFC Wild Card above N.Y Jets based on better record against common opponents (3–1 to Jets' 2–2).
- Green Bay was the first NFC Wild Card above San Francisco based on better conference record (9–3 to 49ers' 8–4).

== Playoffs ==
Jan 12 – Veterans Stadium	Jan 19 – Soldier Field
6	Tampa Bay	9
3	Philadelphia	33
3	Philadelphia	31	Jan 27 – Edward Jones Dome
2	Chicago	19
NFC
Jan 13 – Lambeau Field	3	Philadelphia	24
Jan 20 – Edward Jones Dome
1	St. Louis	29
5	San Francisco	15	NFC Championship
4	Green Bay	17
4	Green Bay	25	Feb 3 – Louisiana Superdome
1	St. Louis	45
Wild-card round
Divisional round
Jan 12 – Network Associates Coliseum	N1	St. Louis	17
Jan. 19 – Foxboro Stadium
A2	New England	20
6	NY Jets	24	Super Bowl XXXVI
3	Oakland	13
3	Oakland	38	Jan 27 – Heinz Field
2	New England	16*
AFC
Jan 13 – Pro Player Stadium	2	New England	24
Jan 20 – Heinz Field
1	Pittsburgh	17
5	Baltimore	20	AFC Championship
5	Baltimore	10
4	Miami	3
1	Pittsburgh	27

* Indicates OT victory

== Milestones ==
The following teams and players set all-time NFL records during the season:

Record	Player/team	Previous record holder
Most sacks, season*	Michael Strahan, New York Giants (22.5)	Mark Gastineau, New York Jets, 1984 (22.0)
Most consecutive games lost, season	Carolina (15)	Tied by 4 teams (14)

* – Sack statistics have only been compiled since 1982.

== Statistical leaders ==
=== Team ===
Points scored	St. Louis Rams (503)
Total yards gained	St. Louis Rams (6,930)
Yards rushing	Pittsburgh Steelers (2,774)
Yards passing	St. Louis Rams (4,903)
Fewest points allowed	Chicago Bears (203)
Fewest total yards allowed	Pittsburgh Steelers (4,504)
Fewest rushing yards allowed	Pittsburgh Steelers (1,195)
Fewest passing yards allowed	Dallas Cowboys (3,019)

=== Individual ===
Scoring	Marshall Faulk, St. Louis (128 points)
Touchdowns	Marshall Faulk, St. Louis (21 TDs)
Most field goals made	Jason Elam, Denver (31 FGs)
Rushing	Priest Holmes, Kansas City (1,555 yards)
Passing	Kurt Warner, St. Louis (4,830 yards)
Passing touchdowns	Kurt Warner, St. Louis (36 TDs)
Pass receiving	Rod Smith, Denver (113 catches)
Pass receiving yards	David Boston, Arizona (1,598)
Punt returns	Troy Brown, New England (14.2 average yards)
Kickoff returns	Ronney Jenkins, San Diego (26.6 average yards)
Interceptions	Ronde Barber, Tampa Bay and Anthony Henry, Cleveland (10)
Punting	Todd Sauerbrun, Carolina (47.5 average yards)
Sacks	Michael Strahan, New York Giants (22.5)

== Awards ==
Most Valuable Player	Kurt Warner, quarterback, St. Louis
Coach of the Year	Dick Jauron, Chicago
Offensive Player of the Year	Marshall Faulk, running back, St. Louis
Defensive Player of the Year	Michael Strahan, defensive end, New York Giants
Offensive Rookie of the Year	Anthony Thomas, running back, Chicago
Defensive Rookie of the Year	Kendrell Bell, linebacker, Pittsburgh
NFL Comeback Player of the Year	Garrison Hearst, running back, San Francisco
Walter Payton NFL Man of the Year	Jerome Bettis, running back, Pittsburgh
Super Bowl Most Valuable Player	Tom Brady, quarterback, New England

All-Pro Team

The following players were named First Team All-Pro by the Associated Press:

Offense
Quarterback	Kurt Warner, St. Louis
Running back	Marshall Faulk, St. Louis; Priest Holmes, Kansas City
Wide receiver	Terrell Owens, San Francisco; David Boston, Arizona
Tight end	Tony Gonzalez, Kansas City
Offensive tackle	Orlando Pace, St. Louis; Walter Jones, Seattle
Offensive guard	Larry Allen, Dallas; Alan Faneca, Pittsburgh
Center	Kevin Mawae, New York Jets

Defense
Defensive end	Michael Strahan, New York Giants; John Abraham, New York Jets
Defensive tackle	Warren Sapp, Tampa Bay; Ted Washington, Chicago
Outside linebacker	Jamir Miller, Cleveland; Jason Gildon, Pittsburgh
Inside linebacker	Brian Urlacher, Chicago; Ray Lewis, Baltimore
Cornerback	Aeneas Williams, St. Louis; Ronde Barber, Tampa Bay
Safety	Brian Dawkins, Philadelphia; Mike Brown, Chicago

Special teams
Kicker	David Akers, Philadelphia
Punter	Todd Sauerbrun, Carolina
Kick returner	Steve Smith, Carolina

Week/ Month	Offensive Player of the Week/Month		Defensive Player of the Week/Month		Special Teams Player of the Week/Month	
Week/ Month	AFC	NFC	AFC	NFC	AFC	NFC
1	Brian Griese (Broncos)	Ahman Green (Packers)	Zach Thomas (Dolphins)	Sammy Knight (Saints)	Tim Dwight (Chargers)	José Cortez (49ers)
2	Peyton Manning (Colts)	Jamal Anderson (Falcons)	Takeo Spikes (Bengals)	London Fletcher (Rams)	Wade Richey (Chargers)	Sean Landeta (Eagles)
3	Priest Holmes (Chiefs)	Kurt Warner (Rams)	Corey Harris (Ravens)	Michael Strahan (Giants)	Phil Dawson (Browns)	K. D. Williams (Packers)
Sept.	Brian Griese (Broncos)	Marshall Faulk (Rams)	Ryan McNeil (Chargers)	Kabeer Gbaja-Biamila (Packers)	Sebastian Janikowski (Raiders)	Rodney Williams (Giants)
4	Shaun Alexander (Seahawks)	Ricky Williams (Saints)	Deltha O'Neal (Broncos)	Brian Urlacher (Bears)	Matt Turk (Dolphins)	John Carney (Saints)
5	Tom Brady (Patriots)	Brett Favre (Packers)	Marvin Jones (Jets)	Michael Strahan (Giants)	Joe Nedney (Titans)	Tim Seder (Cowboys)
6	David Patten (Patriots)	Rod Gardner (Redskins)	Joey Porter (Steelers)	Keith Brooking (Falcons)	Joe Nedney (Titans)	Todd Sauerbrun (Panthers)
7	Corey Dillon (Bengals)	Shane Matthews (Bears)	Denard Walker (Broncos)	Sammy Knight (Saints)	Tom Tupa (Jets)	John Carney (Saints)
Oct.	Jerome Bettis (Steelers)	Ricky Williams (Saints)	Deltha O'Neal (Broncos)	Michael Strahan (Giants)	Ronney Jenkins (Broncos)	John Carney (Saints)
8	Steve McNair (Titans)	Ahman Green (Packers)	John Abraham (Jets)	Mike Brown (Bears)	Matt Stover (Ravens)	Brian Mitchell (Eagles)
9	Shaun Alexander (Seahawks)	Jeff Garcia (49ers)	Jason Gildon (Steelers)	Ronde Barber (Buccaneers)	Tom Rouen (Broncos)	Darrien Gordon (Falcons)
10	Rich Gannon (Raiders)	Randy Moss (Vikings)	Anthony Henry (Browns)	London Fletcher (Rams)	Derrick Mason (Titans)	David Akers (Eagles)
11	Tom Brady (Patriots)	Garrison Hearst (49ers)	William Thomas (Raiders)	Warren Sapp (Buccaneers)	Troy Edwards (Steelers)	Bill Gramática (Cardinals)
Nov.	Rich Gannon (Raiders)	Jeff Garcia (49ers)	John Abraham (Jets)	Kwamie Lassiter (Cardinals)	Jason Elam (Broncos)	Brad Maynard (Bears)
12	Steve McNair (Titans)	Kurt Warner (Rams)	Adalius Thomas (Ravens)	Mike Brown (Bears)	Matt Turk (Dolphins)	Bill & Martín Gramática (Cardinals & Buccaneers)
13	Priest Holmes (Chiefs)	Todd Bouman (Vikings)	Brock Marion (Dolphins)	Aeneas Williams (Rams)	Tim Brown (Raiders)	Sean Landeta (Eagles)
14	Kordell Stewart (Steelers)	Anthony Thomas (Bears)	William Thomas (Raiders)	Grant Wistrom (Rams)	Adam Vinatieri (Patriots)	Darrien Gordon (Falcons)
15	Vinny Testaverde (Jets)	Chris Chandler (Falcons)	Ray Lewis (Ravens)	Ronde Barber (Buccaneers)	Ken Walter (Patriots)	Brian Urlacher (Bears)
16	Jon Kitna (Bengals)	Quincy Carter (Cowboys)	Zach Thomas (Dolphins)	Derrick Brooks (Buccaneers)	Charlie Rogers (Seahawks)	Todd Yoder (Buccaneers)
17	Lamar Smith (Dolphins)	Marshall Faulk (Rams)	Peter Boulware (Ravens)	Andre Carter (49ers)	John Hall (Jets)	Dorsey Levens (Packers)
Dec.	Kordell Stewart (Steelers)	Marshall Faulk (Rams)	Brock Marion (Dolphins)	Simeon Rice (Buccaneers)	Troy Brown (Patriots)	Todd Sauerbrun (Panthers)

Month	Rookie of the Month	
Month	Offensive	Defensive
Sept.	LaDainian Tomlinson (Chargers)	Fred Smoot (Redskins)
Oct.	Anthony Thomas (Bears)	Kendrell Bell (Steelers)
Nov.	Chris Chambers (Dolphins)	Kendrell Bell (Steelers)
Dec.	Dominic Rhodes (Colts)	Andre Carter (49ers)

== Head coach/front office changes ==
Head coach

- Buffalo Bills – Gregg Williams replaced Wade Phillips, who was fired following the 2000 season
- Cleveland Browns – Butch Davis replaced Chris Palmer, who was fired following the 2000 season
- Detroit Lions – Marty Mornhinweg replaced interim head coach Gary Moeller, who replaced Bobby Ross who resigned during the 2000 season.
- Kansas City Chiefs – Dick Vermeil replaced Gunther Cunningham, who was fired following the 2000 season
- New York Jets – Herman Edwards replaced Al Groh, who resigned to become the head coach of the University of Virginia.
- Washington Redskins – Marty Schottenheimer replaced interim head coach Terry Robiskie who replaced Norv Turner, who was fired during the 2000 season
- Houston Texans – Dom Capers was hired as the expansion Texans’ first head coach on January 19, 2001. The Texans would play their inaugural season the next year.

Front office

- Buffalo Bills – Tom Donahoe replaced John Butler, who was fired on December 19, 2000. Donahoe was hired on January 10, 2001.
- Detroit Lions – Matt Millen replaced Chuck Schmidt, who resigned on January 8, 2001. Millen was hired the next day.
- New York Jets – Terry Bradway replaced Bill Parcells, who resigned as the team's director of football operations on January 9, 2001.
- Washington Redskins – New head coach Marty Schottenheimer fired director of player personnel Vinny Cerrato on January 24, 2001. Schottenheimer acted as his own general manager.
- San Diego Chargers – John Butler, hired on Jan 4, 2001, filled the position that had been vacant since Bobby Beathard's retirement on April 25, 2000. Before Butler's hiring, player personnel director Billy Devaney took the responsibility of player acquisitions.
- Green Bay Packers – Head coach Mike Sherman assumed Ron Wolf's duties as GM. Wolf announced he would retire as Packers GM in February 2001, stayed on through the April NFL draft and officially retired as Packers GM in June 2001.
- San Francisco 49ers – Terry Donahue replaced Bill Walsh, who resigned as vice president and general manager shortly after the year's draft in a planned move. Walsh remains with the 49ers as a special consultant.
- Philadelphia Eagles – Head coach Andy Reid assumed Tom Modrak's duties as GM. Modrak was fired on May 8, 2001. Owner Jeffrey Lurie cited his displeasure with Modrak's insistence on having an escape clause in his contract as the primary reason. The next day, Reid was named executive vice president of football operations, effectively making him the team's general manager.
- Chicago Bears – Jerry Angelo was hired as the Bear's first general manager since 1987 on June 12, 2001. Mark Hatley, who had been de facto general manager in his role as vice president of pro personnel, had joined the Green Bay Packers front office as vice president of football operations in May 2001, after it was clear he was out of the Bears’ general manager search.

== Stadium changes ==
- The Denver Broncos moved from Mile High Stadium to Invesco Field at Mile High, with the investment company Invesco acquiring the naming rights
- The Pittsburgh Steelers moved from Three Rivers Stadium to Heinz Field, with the H. J. Heinz Company acquiring the naming rights

In addition, the AstroTurf at Veterans Stadium was replaced with NexTurf after a preseason game between the Philadelphia Eagles and Baltimore Ravens was canceled for poor field conditions.

== Uniform changes ==
- New Orleans Saints – Replaced their gold pants with black pants.
- San Diego Chargers – White pants instead of blue with their white jerseys.
- St. Louis Rams – New font for uniform numbers.
- Chicago Bears – White pants instead of blue with their white jerseys.
- Jacksonville Jaguars – Started wearing black shoes with their uniforms.

Following 9/11, every jersey had a patch to remember those who died on that day, while the New York Jets and New York Giants wore a patch to remember the firefighters who died.

== Television ==
This was the fourth year under the league's eight-year broadcast contracts with ABC, CBS, Fox, and ESPN to televise Monday Night Football, the AFC package, the NFC package, and Sunday Night Football, respectively.

Pat Summerall announced that this would be his last season as a full-time NFL broadcaster. This would also be John Madden's last year of commentating on Fox, ending the 21-season Summerall–Madden pairing that dated back since 1981 on CBS. With Matt Millen leaving Fox to become the general manager of the Detroit Lions, Fox tapped Daryl Johnston from CBS and the then-recently retired quarterback Troy Aikman to join Dick Stockton as Fox's No. 2 team.

Deion Sanders replaced Craig James as an analyst on The NFL Today as James served as a color commentator until 2002.
