= CIF California State Meet alumni =

This is a list of the notable people who have participated in the CIF California State Meet. It includes their results at the CIF California State Meet, cross referenced to a highlight of their notable achievements. For the majority of these athletes, this meet was the last NFHS sanctioned meet of their high school career.

Name	CIF Results	High School	Known for
Terry Albritton	1971 and 1972 2nd Shot Put	Newport Harbor High School, Newport Beach	1976 World Record in Shot put: 71 ft, 81/3 inches (21.85m) National Champion Shot put, 1976, 1977
Andrea Anderson	1992 3rd 100m, 3rd 200m 1993 2nd 100m 3rd 200m 1995 3rd 200m	Long Beach Poly, Long Beach	2000 Olympic Gold Medal 4 × 400 m Relay
Jeshua Anderson	2006 2nd 110H and 300H; 2007 National High School Record 300H	Taft High School, Woodland Hills	2008 World Junior Champion, now at WSU
Henry Andrade	1979 3rd 300 hurdles	Johnson High School, Sacramento	National Football Champion 1981 and 1982 at SMU; 1996 Olympian for Cape Verde Islands
Tori Anthony	2006 and 2007 1st Pole Vault	Castilleja School, Palo Alto	National High School Record Pole Vault
Rink Babka	1954 1st (non-scoring) Discus	Palo Alto High School, Palo Alto	1960 Olympic Silver Medal Discus
Willie Banks	1973 and 1974 1st Triple Jump	Oceanside High School, Oceanside	World Record Triple Jump, 3 time Olympian, 1983 World Championships Silver medal
Arthur Barnard	1947 120y hurdles 2nd	La Jolla High School, La Jolla	1952 Bronze medal Olympic 110H
Lee Barnes	1923 and 1924 1st Pole Vault	Hollywood High School, Hollywood	1924 Olympic Gold Medal Pole Vault just after graduating world record Pole Vault
Scott Bauhs	2004 2nd 3200m	San Ramon Valley High School, San Ramon	2011 World Championships, 2008 and 2010 World Cross Country Championships
Jahvid Best	2007 1st 100m, 2nd 200m	Salesian High School, Richmond	Running back for the Detroit Lions, 2016 Olympian for St. Lucia
Ato Bolden	1991 3rd 200m	Piedmont Hills High School, San Jose	4 Olympic medals 1997 World Champion 200m Gold medal for Trinidad and Tobago
Jeanette Bolden	1976 3rd 100y 1977 1st 100y, 4th 220y	Centennial High School, Compton	1984 Olympic Gold Medal 4×100; UCLA head track coach
Bobby Bonds	1964 1st Long Jump	Riverside Poly High School, Riverside	14 years Major League Baseball 332 HR, 461 SB, father of Barry Bonds
Gentry Bradley	1992 1st 200m, 2nd 100m	Pius X High School, Downey	1997 World University Games Gold medal 200m
Valerie Brisco Hooks	1977 1st 440y	Locke High School, Los Angeles	1984 Olympics, first person to win both 200m and 400m at the same Olympics plus 1984 Gold, 1988 silver 4×400 relay
Alice Brown	1978 2nd 100y	John Muir High School; Pasadena	1984 Olympics silver 100m, gold 4×100 relay 1988 Olympic, 1987 World Championship Gold medals 4×100 relay
Benny Brown	1971 6th 440y	Sunnyvale High School, Sunnyvale	1976 Olympic Gold Medal 4×400 relay
Reynaldo Brown	1968 and 1969 1st High Jump	Compton High School, Compton	1968 Olympics, 5th place High Jump while still in high school
Ron Brown	1979 3rd 100y	Baldwin Park High School, Baldwin Park	1984 Gold Medal 4×100 relay, NFL 8 years, mostly with Los Angeles Rams
Stephanie Brown Trafton	1998 1st Discus, 1997 2nd Shot Put	Arroyo Grande High School, Arroyo Grande	2008 Olympic Gold Medal Discus
Wendy Brown	1984 singlehandedly won the team title, winning Long Jump, Triple Jump and High Jump, 2nd 100 hurdles (behind Gail Devers); 1983 3rd Long Jump, 1st Triple Jump; 1982 1st Long Jump, 1st Triple Jump	Woodside High School, Woodside	1988 Olympics, Heptathlon; 2 World Records in Triple Jump; American Gladiators
Noah Bryant	2002 1st Shot Put, 2001 2nd Shot Put	Carpinteria High School, Carpinteria	15th 2007 IAAF World Championships in Athletics Shot Put
Reggie Bush	2003 3rd 100m and 200m	Helix High School, La Mesa	USC National Football Championship and scandal, Heisman Trophy, NFL New Orleans Saints, Super Bowl ring
Jill Camarena	2000 1st Discus, 2nd Shot Put; 1999 1st Shot Put, 2nd Discus	Woodland High School, Woodland	2008 Olympics, 12th Shot Put
Tonie Campbell	1978 3rd 120yHH, 4th 330yLH	Banning High School, Los Angeles	1988 Olympic Bronze medal 110 metres hurdles
Randall Carroll	2008 1st 100m and 1st 200m 2009 1st 100m and 1st 200m	Cathedral High School, Los Angeles	One of only three back-to-back champions in the 100 and 200 meters
Ed Caruthers	1963 1st High Jump	Valley High School, Santa Ana	1968 Silver Medal Olympic High Jump
Wayne Collett	1966 1st 440y	Gardena High School, Gardena	1972 Silver Medal 400 metres
Curtis Conway	1989 1st 100m, 2nd 200m 1988 2nd 100m, 3rd 200m	Hawthorne High School, Hawthorne	NFL 12 years, football broadcaster
Mark Crear	1987 2nd 300 hurdles, 4th 110 hurdles	Rowland High School, Rowland Heights	1996 Olympic Silver Medal 110 hurdles, 2000 Olympic Bronze Medal 110 hurdles, 1994 and 1998 Goodwill Games champion
Randy Cross	1972 1st Shot Put	Crespi Carmelite High School, Encino	13 years with San Francisco 49ers, 3 Super Bowl rings XVI, XIX, XXIII
Robert Culp	1947 2nd Pole Vault	Berkeley High School, Berkeley	Actor I-Spy, Everybody Loves Raymond
Tim Danielson	1965 and 1966 1st Mile Run	Chula Vista High School, Chula Vista	the second of only (now) 5 high schoolers to break the 4 minute mile
Desiree Davila	1998 and 1999 1600m, 8th place, 2000 5th place, 2001 3200m 4th place 1999 800m 9th place	Hilltop High School, Chula Vista	qualified for 2012 Olympic marathon
Jack Davis	1949 120y and 180 y hurdles 1st, Long Jump 3rd	Hoover High School, Glendale	1952 and 1956 Silver medals Olympic 110H; 1955 Gold medal Pan Am Games
Steve DeBerg	1972 2nd pole vault	Savanna High School, Anaheim	NFL Quarterback
Lashinda Demus	1999 and 2000 1st 300 hurdles	Long Beach Wilson, Long Beach	2012 Silver medal Olympic 400 hurdles, Gold medal 2011 World Championships; 2005 and 2009 Silver Medal World Championship 400 hurdles 2009 Gold Medal 4×400 relay National High School Record 300 hurdles and 4×400 relay
Leslie Deniz	1979 and 1980 1st Discus	Gridley High School, Gridley	1984 Silver Medal Olympic Discus; National High School Record
Gail Devers	1984 1st 100H and 100m, 2nd Long Jump; 1983 1st Long Jump, 2nd 300H, 3rd 100	Sweetwater High School, National City	1992 and 1996 Olympic Gold Medals in 100 metres and 1996 4×100 relay 9 World Championship Gold Medals
Jim Doehring	1980 2nd Shot Put	San Clemente High School, San Clemente	1992 Silver Medal Olympic Shot Put
Charles Dumas	1955 1st, 1954 2nd, 1953 4th High Jump	Jefferson High School; Los Angeles; Centennial High School, Compton	1956 Gold Medal Olympic High Jump and World record holder, first man over 7 feet
Foy Draper	1931 1st 100y, 1932 2nd 100y and 220y	Huntington Park High School, Huntington Park	1936 Olympic Gold Medal 4×100 relay
Clancy Edwards	1973 1st 200m 2nd 100m	Santa Ana High School, Santa Ana	1977 World Cup and World University Games champion 200m
Henry Ellard	1979 1st Triple Jump	Hoover High School, Fresno	16 years NFL wide receiver, 3 times Pro Bowl
Lee Evans	1964 4th 440y	Overfelt High School, San Jose	1968 Gold Medal 400m and 4×400 relay, both World Records both lasted almost 20 years
Danny Everett	1985 2nd 400m	Fairfax High School, Los Angeles	1998 Gold medal Olympic 4×400 relay, Bronze 400m
Justin Fargas	1997 1st 100m, 1998 3rd 100m	Notre Dame High School; Sherman Oaks	currently 8th year in NFL
Allyson Felix	2003 1st 100m, 1st 200m 2002 1st 100m, 1st 200m 2001 1st 100m, 2nd 200m	L.A. Baptist High School, Los Angeles	2012 and 2016 Gold medal Olympic 4x400 and 4×100 relays, 2004 and 2008 Silver medal Olympic 200m, tied for most Olympic track and field medals by a woman (9), 3 consecutive times 200m World Champion, plus 400m in 2015; Junior world record 200m
Lauren Fleshman	1999 1st 3200m	Canyon High School, Hemet	2006 and 2010 American champion in 5,000m
Mark Fricker	1977 2nd Mile 1998 3rd Mile	Hemet High School, Hemet	notable pacemaker
David Gettis	2003 400m, 2004 400m, 2005 400m	Susan Miller Dorsey High School, Los Angeles	only three-time champion in 400m in state history
Michael Granville	1996 and 1994 1st 800m, 2nd 1995; 1993 3rd 400m	Bell Gardens High School, Bell Gardens	set the still standing National High School Record in the 800m in qualifying
Mel Gray	1967 1st 100y and 220y, 2nd Long Jump	Montgomery High School, Santa Rosa	13 years in the NFL; National High School Record 100y
Ryan Hall	2001 1st 1600m 2000 1st 3200m	Big Bear High School, Big Bear	American record holder Half Marathon; 2008 Olympic marathon 10th place qualified for 2012 Olympic marathon
Millard Hampton	1974 1st 200m 1973 2nd 200m 1972 3rd 200m	Silver Creek High School, San Jose	1976 Silver Medal Olympic 200m, Gold Medal 4×100 relay
Tayyiba Haneef-Park	1997 1st High Jump	Laguna Hills High School, Laguna Hills	2008 and 2012 Silver Medal Olympics on US Volleyball team
Danny Harris	1983 1st 300H, 3rd 110H, 1982 3rd 300H	Perris High School, Perris	1984 Silver Medal Olympic 400 hurdles Junior world record 400 hurdles
Alvin Harrison	1993 joined twin brother Calvin on 1st place 4×400 relay and 3rd 4×100 relay	North Salinas High School, Salinas	1996 Gold Medal Olympic 4×400 relay, 2000 Silver medal 400 metres, 4×400 later disqualified due to Drug violation by a teammate now competing for Dominican Republic
Calvin Harrison	1993 1st 400m, 200m and 4×400 relay, 3rd 4×100 relay	North Salinas High School, Salinas	National High School Record 400m 2000 Gold Medal 4×400 later disqualified due to Drug violation by a teammate
Joanna Hayes	1995 1st 100H and 300H, 2nd 4×400 relay 1994 2nd 100H	North High School, Riverside	2004 Olympic Gold Medal 100 metres hurdles
Bud Held	1946 4th Pole Vault	Grossmont High School, El Cajon	World record in Javelin throw invented and manufactured sports products including Held Javelins and Ektelon
Monique Henderson	1998-2001 1st 400m, 2000 1st 200m	Morse High School, San Diego	2004 and 2008 Gold Medal Olympic 4×400 relay National High School Record 400m
Jim Hines	1964 1st 100y and 220y	McClymonds High School, Oakland	1968 Gold Medal Olympic 100m and 4 × 100 m First FAT world record, lasting almost 15 year breaking the 10-second barrier
Tom Hintnaus	1976 1st Pole Vault	Aviation High School, Redondo Beach	1980 Gold medal Olympic Boycott Games for USA; 1984 Olympian for Brazil first Calvin Klein underwear model
Bud Houser	1920-1922 1st Shot Put and Discus; 1921-1922 16 Lb Shot Put	Oxnard High School, Oxnard	1924 Gold Medals Olympic Shot Put and Discus, 1928 Gold Medal Discus developed the spin technique
Denean Howard	1979 3rd 440y 1st 4×440 relay 1980 1st 400m, 1st 4×100 relay, 1st 4×400 relay 1981 1st 200m, 1st 4×400 relay, 2nd 100m 1982 1st 200m, 1st 400m, 2nd 100m	San Gorgonio High School, San Bernardino; Kennedy High School, Los Angeles	1984 Gold Medal Olympic 4×400 relay 1988 and 1992 Silver medal 4×400 relay National High School Record 400m, 4×440 relay and 4×400 relay
Sherri Howard	1979 1st 440y 2nd 100y 1st 4×440 relay 1980 1st 200m, 2nd 100m, 1st 4×100 relay 1st 4×400 relay	San Gorgonio High School, San Bernardino; Kennedy High School, Los Angeles	1984 Gold Medal Olympic 4×400 relay 1988 Silver medal 4×400 relay National High School Record 440y and 4×440 relay
Sheila Hudson	1985 1st Triple Jump, 1984 3rd	Rio Linda High School; Rio Linda, California	1996 Olympian Triple Jump; 2 time World Record, Triple Jump
Chelsea Johnson	2002 1st Pole Vault, 2000 5th 300H	Atascadero High School, Atascadero	2009 Silver medal World Championships Pole Vault
Cornelius Johnson	1932 and 1933 1st High Jump, 1931 2nd High Jump	Los Angeles High School, Los Angeles	1936 Olympic Gold Medal High Jump
Rafer Johnson	1954 1st 120yHH, 2nd 180 LH	Kingsburg High School, Kingsburg	1960 Gold Medal Olympic Decathlon
Florence Griffith-Joyner	1978 6th 220y	Jordan High School, Los Angeles	1988 Gold medal Olympic 100m, 200m, 4×100 relay, Silver 4×400; 1987 Gold World Championships 4×100 relay, Silver 200m 1984 Silver medal Olympic 200m current World record 100m and 200m
Marion Jones	1990-1993 1st 100m and 200m	Rio Mesa High School, Oxnard; Thousand Oaks High School, Thousand Oaks	2000 5 Olympic medals (3 Gold), 5 World Championship Gold medals Famously disqualified for using performance-enhancing drugs National High School Record 100m, 200m and World youth best 200m
Natalie Kaaiawahia	1980-1983 1st Shot Put, 1981 and 1983 1st Discus	Fullerton Union High School, Fullerton	National High School Record Shot Put
Deena Kastor	1991 and 1990 1st 3200m 1989 3rd 3200m	Agoura High School, Agoura Hills	2004 Bronze Medal Olympic Marathon
Napoleon Kaufman	1990 1st 100m, 200m	Lompoc High School, Lompoc	6 years Oakland Raiders, 1991 NCAA Football Championship Washington
Meb Keflezighi	1994 1st 1600m and 3200m 1993 2nd 3200, 3rd 1600m	San Diego High School, San Diego	2004 Silver Medal Olympic Marathon; New York Marathon winner qualified for 2012 Olympic marathon
Leamon King	1951 1st 220y, 2nd 100y, 1952 2nd 100y	Delano High School, Delano	1956 Gold medal Olympic 4×100 relay
Fred Kuller	1964 2nd 220y, 3rd 100y	Santiago High School, Garden Grove	USC world record 4×110y relay
Lionel Larry	2003 1st 200m	Dominguez High School, Compton	2009 Gold medal World Championships 4×400 relay
Dave Laut	1972 2nd Shot Put	Santa Clara High School, Oxnard	1984 Bronze Medal Olympic Shot Put
Steve Lewis	1986 1st 400m	American High School, Fremont	1988 Gold Medal 400 metres and 4×400 relay, 1992 Gold Medal 4×400 relay Silver Medal 400m Junior world record 400m
Todd Lichti	1985 9th Triple Jump	Mt. Diablo High School, Concord	5 years in the NBA
James Lofton	1974 1st Long Jump	Washington High School, Los Angeles	16 years in the NFL; Pro Football Hall of Fame
Chaunté Lowe	2001 1st High Jump; 2002 2nd High Jump, Long Jump, Triple Jump	North High School, Riverside	2005 Silver medal World Championships; 2004 and 2008 Olympian; Current American record holder High Jump
David Mack	1978 and 1979 1st 880y	Locke High School, Los Angeles	1987 World Championships in Athletics, Rampart police corruption scandal, allegedly played a role in the murder of Notorious B.I.G
Joshua Mance	2010 1st 400m, 4th 200m 2009 2nd 400m	Don Antonio Lugo High School, Chino	2012 Silver medal Olympic 4×400 relay, 2010 World Junior Championships 4×400 Gold, 2011 Pan American Junior Championships 400 and 4×400 Gold, 2009 World Youth Championships 400m Silver, Medley Relay Gold
Michael Marsh	1985 1st 200m, 1st 4×400 relay 1984 1st 4×400 relay	Hawthorne High School, Hawthorne	1992 Gold medal Olympic 200m, 4×100 relay 1996 Silver 4×100 relay
Pam Marshall	1978 2nd 220y, 3rd 100y	Long Beach Jordan, Long Beach	1987 World Champion 4×100 relay, 1988 Olympian
Bob Mathias	1948 1st 120HH and 180LH	Tulare Union High School, Tulare	1948 Olympic Gold Medal Decathlon while still in high school 1952 Olympic Gold Medal Decathlon; 4 term U.S. Congressman
George Mattos	1947 1st Pole Vault	Pacific Grove High School, Pacific Grove	1952 and 1956 Olympian
Leslie Maxie	1985 1st 300H; 1984 1st 300H; 1983 1st 400, 2nd 100H; 1982 2nd 100H 3rd 400 4th High Jump	Mills High School, Millbrae	National High School Record and World youth best 400 hurdles ESPN newscaster
Misty May	1993 2nd HJ	Newport Harbor, Newport Beach	Beach Volleyball Gold Medal 2004, 2008 and 2012
Remontay McClain	2010 1st 100m and 1st 200m 2011 1st 100m and 1st 200m	Covina High School, Covina	One of only three back-to-back champions in the 100 and 200 meters
Earl McCullouch	1964 1st 120HH and 180LH; 1963 3rd 180LH	Long Beach Poly, Long Beach	9 years in the NFL; National High School Record 180LH
Hugh McElhenny	1947 1st 120HH, 180LH and Long Jump	Washington High School, Los Angeles	13 years in the NFL; Pro Football Hall of Fame
Inger Miller	1988 2nd 100m, 3rd 200m, 3rd 4×100 relay 1989 2nd 100m and 200m, 1st 4×100 relay	John Muir High School; Pasadena	1996 Gold medal Olympic 4×100 relay 1999 Gold medal World Championships 200m, Silver 100m 1997 Gold medal 4×100, 2003 Silver medal 4×100 relay
Obea Moore	1995 1st 400m, 2nd 200m,	John Muir High School; Pasadena	World youth best 400m, World Junior Champion 400m
Ron Morris	1952 and 1953 1st Pole Vault	Burroughs High School; Burbank	1960 Silver Medal Olympic Pole Vault
Kim Mortensen	1996 1st 3200m 1995, 4th 3200m 1994 5th 3200m	Thousand Oaks High School, Thousand Oaks	National High School Record 3200 meters (set in qualifying)
Jovesa Naivalu	1995 1st 110H; 1996 1st 110H, 2nd 300H	Fremont High School; Sunnyvale	1996 Olympian for Fiji, professional rugby player
Hannibal Navies	1994 5th 4x400 relay	Berkeley High School, Berkeley	NFL Linebacker Carolina Panthers, Green Bay Packers, Cincinnati Bengals, San Francisco 49ers
Bryshon Nellum	2006 1st 200m, 1st 400m 2007 1st 200m, 1st 400m	Long Beach Polytechnic High School, Long Beach	2012 Silver medal Olympic 4×400 relay, Gatorade Track & Field Athlete of the Year 2007
Jim Niedhart	1973 1st Shot Put	Newport Harbor High School, Newport Beach	Professional Wrestler in the WWF
Brent Noon	1990 1st Shot Put, 2nd Discus; 1989 1st Shot Put, 5th Discus; 1988 3rd Shot Put	Fallbrook Union High School, Fallbrook	1995 5th World Championships; National Champion Shot Put #2 all-time high school Shot Put
Parry O'Brien	1949 3rd Shot Put, 1st 16 pound shot put	Santa Monica High School, Santa Monica	1952 and 1956 Gold Medal, 1960 Silver Medal Olympic Shot put developed the glide technique
Charley Paddock	1916 and 1918 1st 100y and 220y 1917 1st 220y 2nd 100y	Pasadena High School; Pasadena	1920 Gold medal Olympic 100m and 4×100, Silver 200m 1924 Silver medal 200m
Doug Padilla	1974 13th 2 Mile	Marina High School, San Leandro	Multiple American records 1984 Olympian and multiple time international athlete
Ramona Pagel	1979 3rd Shot Put	Schurr High School, Montebello	Current American Record in Shot put, 4 time Olympian Pan American Games Gold, Silver and Bronze medalist
Michelle Perry	1997 2nd Long Jump	Quartz Hill High School, Lancaster	2005 and 2007 Gold medal World Championships 100H
Andre Phillips	1977 1st 330y LH, 1976 4th 330y LH	Silver Creek High School, San Jose	1988 Olympic Gold Medal 400 hurdles
Polly Plumer	1980-1982 1st Mile	University High School, Irvine	National High School Record Mile run
George Porter	1984 and 1985 1st 300H	Cabrillo High School, Lompoc	National High School Record 300 hurdles
Mike Powell	1981 2nd High Jump	Edgewood High School, West Covina	Current World record Long Jump; 1991 World Champion
Suzy Powell	1992-1994 1st Discus, 1991 2nd Discus	Downey High School, Modesto	National High School Record and American record Discus; 3 time Olympian
John Raitt	1935 1st Football Throw	Fullerton Union High School, Fullerton	Stage Actor Carousel, Oklahoma!, The Pajama Game, Carnival in Flanders, Three Wishes for Jamie, and A Joyful Noise and star of 1957 movie version of The Pajama Game, father of Bonnie Raitt
Ken-Yon Rambo	1997 1st 300H 1st 4×400 relay	Long Beach Poly, Long Beach	4 years in NFL, now in Canadian Football League; Grey Cup champion with Calgary Stampeders, led the league in receiving yards
James Robinson	1972 2nd 880y	McClymonds High School, Oakland	1976 Olympian, 1979 Gold Medal Pan American Games 800m 1979 and 1981 2nd World Cup 800m 7 time National Champion
Mack Robinson	1934 1st 100y, 4th Long Jump, 4th 4×200 relay	John Muir High School; Pasadena	1936 Silver medal Olympic 200m
Carol Rodríguez	2003 3rd 100m	Western High School, Anaheim	2008 Olympian for Puerto Rico, 2010 Gold medal 4×100 relay, Silver medal 200m Central American and Caribbean Games
Shannon Rowbury	2003 1st 1600m	Sacred Heart Cathedral Preparatory, San Francisco	2009 Bronze medal World Championships 1500m
Felix Sanchez	1995 3rd 300H	University City High School, San Diego	2004 and 2012 Olympic Gold Medal 400 hurdles 2001 and 2003 Gold medal, 2007 Silver medal World Championships for Dominican Republic
Keri Sanchez	1988 2nd 100H, 2nd 300H, 3rd Triple Jump 1989 3rd 100H, 2nd 300H 3rd Triple Jump	Santa Teresa High School, San Jose	Professional soccer player
James Sanford	1977 1st 400m and 4×400 relay, 2nd 200m	John Muir High School; Pasadena	1979 World Cup champion 400m
Steve Scott	1974 2nd 880y	Upland High School; Upland	American Record Mile run, most sub-4 minute miles in history
Bob Seagren	1963 4th Pole Vault	Pomona High School, Pomona	1968 Gold medal Olympic Pole Vault; 1972 Silver medal Pole Vault; 2 time Superstars winner actor on Soap
Guinn Smith	1937 tied 2nd High Jump and Pole Vault	Glendale High School, Glendale	1948 Gold medal Olympic Pole Vault
Herschel Curry Smith	1922 1st 100y, 4th 220y, 1923 3rd 100y, 2nd 220y	San Fernando High School, San Fernando	Track coach, creator of Los Angeles Invitational track meet
Ronnie Ray Smith	1966 3rd 220y	Manual Arts High School, Los Angeles	1968 Gold medal Olympic 4×100, tied World Record 100m
Tommie Smith	1963 1st 440y, 4th 100 y 1962 4th 100y 2nd Long Jump, 4th 440y	Lemoore High School, Lemoore	1968 Gold medal Olympic 200m, first FAT World Record; 1968 Olympics Black Power salute
Tracy Smith	1963 1st Mile	Arcadia High School, Arcadia	1968 Olympics, 10,000m, 11th; 3-time world-record holder indoor 3-mile; Three-time Track & Field News No. 1-ranked U.S. runner: 10,000-meters, '66, '68; 5,000-meters '69; Six-time AAU Champion: Indoor 3-Mile, '66, '67, '73; Outdoor 3-mile, '69; Outdoor 6-mile, '66; Outdoor 10,000m, '68.
Duane Solomon	2003 1st 800m	Cabrillo High School, Lompoc	4th place, 2012 Olympics 800m, International competitor at 2007 World Championships 800m
Shalonda Solomon	2002 2nd 100m, 2nd 200m 1st 4×100 and 4×400; 2003 2nd 100m, 2nd 200m 1st 4×100 and 4×400; 2002 2nd 100m, 2nd 200m 1st 4×100 and 4×400; 2001 2nd 100m, 3rd 200m	Long Beach Poly, Long Beach	2010 Silver medal World Cup 100m and Gold 4 × 100 m
Jim Sorensen	1986 6th 800m	Villa Park High School, Villa Park	Masters world record 800m and 1500m
James Stallworth	1989 1st Long Jump, 4th 100m	Tulare Union High School, Tulare	National High School Record Long Jump; World Junior Champion
Willie Steele	1941 2nd Long Jump	Hoover High School, San Diego	1948 Olympic gold medal Long Jump
Michael Stember	1995 and 1996 1st 1600m 1994 2nd 1600m	Jesuit High School, Carmichael	1999 and 2003 Silver medal Pan American Games 1500m
Dwight Stones	1971 1st High Jump	Glendale High School, Glendale	1972 and 1976 Olympic Bronze medal High Jump; National High School Record High Jump; ESPN and NBC sports commentator
Lynn Swann	1970 1st Long Jump	Serra High School, San Mateo	NFL 9 years, Pro Football Hall of Famer; 4 Super Bowl rings (IX, X, XIII, XIV) and Super Bowl MVP; ABC sports football commentator
Adam Tafralis	2002 2nd Shot Put	Mills High School, Millbrae	2008 Hamilton Tiger-Cats
Jeneba Tarmoh	2006 and 2007 1st place 100m and 200m	Mt. Pleasant High School, San Jose	2012 Gold medal Olympic 4×100 relay, 2008 World Junior Championships in Athletics Gold medal 100m and 4×100, 2012 Olympian
Henry Thomas	1983 2nd 100m, 1st 200m, 4×400, 2nd 4×100; 1984 1st 100m 1st 200m and 4×400	Hawthorne High School, Hawthorne	World youth best 100m and 400m National High School Record 4×400 relay
Earl Thompson	1915 1st 120 y Hurdles	Long Beach Poly, Long Beach	1920 Gold medal Olympic 110 metres hurdles running for Canada
Delos Thurber	1934 1st High Jump	Glendale High School, Glendale	1936 Bronze medal Olympic High Jump
Geoff Vanderstock	1964 4th 120HH	Pomona Catholic High School, Pomona	1968 Olympian, World Record Holder 400IH
Maggie Vessey	1999 6th 400m	Soquel High School, Soquel	Qualified for 2009 IAAF World Championships in Athletics
Janeene Vickers	1987 1st 100H, 1st 300H, 1st 100m 1986 1st 100H, 1st 300H; 1985 4th 400m, 5th 100H; 1984 6th 300H	Pomona High School, Pomona	Bronze medal 1992 Olympics 400 hurdles
Tyree Washington	1994 1st Long Jump; 1995 2nd 400m	La Sierra High School, Riverside	2003 World Champion outdoors and Indoors
Quincy Watts	1988 2nd 200m 1987 1st 100m, 1st 200m 1986 2nd 100m, 1st 200m	Taft High School, Woodland Hills	1992 Olympic Gold medal 400m and 4×400 relay current World record 4×400 relay
Melissa Weis	1990 1st Discus, 2nd Shot Put; 1989 1st Discus, 1st Shot Put; 1988 1st Discus	Bakersfield High School, Bakersfield	International competitor at 1995 World Championships
Charles White	1976 1st 300H	San Fernando High School, San Fernando	Heisman Trophy; 9 years in the NFL
Russell White	1987 2nd Triple Jump	Crespi Carmelite High School, Encino	3 years in NFL
Bruce Wilhelm	1963 1st Shot Put, 2nd Discus	Fremont High School; Sunnyvale	1976 Olympian in Weightlifting; 1977 and 1978 World's Strongest Man
Angela Williams	1997 and 1998 1st 100m	Chino High School; Chino	2003 Silver medal World Championships 4×100 relay National High School Record 100m
Dokie Williams	1977 1st Triple Jump; 1978 1st Triple Jump, Long Jump, 4th 100y	El Camino High School, Oceanside	5 years with Los Angeles Raiders; 1 Super Bowl ring (XVIII)
Randy Williams	1971 1st Long Jump	Edison High School; Fresno	1972 Gold Medal Olympic Long Jump; Junior world record Long Jump
Ulis Williams	1960 1st 440y 1961 1st 440y 2nd 4×220 relay	Compton High School; Compton	1964 Gold medal Olympic 4×400 relay President Compton College
Linetta Wilson	1984 and 1985 2nd 400m	John Muir High School; Pasadena	1996 Gold medal Olympic 4×400 relay
Reggie Wyatt	2009 1st 300H and 400m 2007 2nd 300H, 4×100 and 4×400	La Sierra High School, Riverside; North High School, Riverside	National High School Record 300 hurdles
Frank Wykoff	1928 1st 220y, 2nd 100y 2nd 4×220 relay 1927 1st 100y, 220y, Long Jump, 4×220 relay 1926 3rd 100y 2nd 4×220 relay	Glendale High School, Glendale	1928, 1932 and 1936 Gold medal Olympic 4×100 relay
Juliana Yendork	1989-1991 1st Long Jump and Triple Jump	Walnut High School; Walnut	National High School Record Triple Jump; Olympian for Ghana while still in high school
Kevin Young	1984 3rd 110HH	Jordan High School, Los Angeles	1992 Gold medal Olympic 400H; 1993 Gold World Champion 400H current World record 400H
Louis Zamperini	1934 1st Mile	Torrance High School; Torrance	1936 Olympics World War II prisoner and hero
