= Blossom Valley Athletic League =

Blossom Valley Athletic League (BVAL) is a high school athletic conference in Santa Clara County, California. It is the county's largest high school sports league and is part of the CIF Central Coast Section of the California Interscholastic Federation.

== Structure and history ==
The Blossom Valley Athletic League comprises 26 high schools in Santa Clara County. Based on the strength of each school's specific sports program, the league is divided into three divisions: Mt. Hamilton, Santa Teresa, and West Valley.

It was the first high school sports league in Santa Clara County to cancel its Spring 2020 sports seasons in response to the COVID-19 pandemic. After California's stay-at-home order was lifted in January 2021, the BVAL laid out plans for the return of high school sports.

== Current members ==
Current members include both public and private high schools. The following high schools are listed as full members by the Blossom Valley Athletic League.

- Andrew Hill High School
- Branham High School
- Christopher High School
- Del Mar High School
- Evergreen Valley High School
- Gilroy High School
- Gunderson High School
- Independence High School
- James Lick High School
- Leigh High School
- Leland High School
- Lincoln High School
- Live Oak High School
- Mt. Pleasant High School
- Oak Grove High School
- Overfelt High School
- Piedmont Hills High School
- Pioneer High School
- Prospect High School
- San José High School
- Santa Teresa High School
- Silver Creek High School
- Sobrato High School
- Westmont High School
- Willow Glen High School
- Yerba Buena High School
