= Steve Papin =

American football player and coach (born 1972)

No. 1
- Position: Offensive specialist

Personal information
- Born: February 28, 1972 (age 54)
- Listed height: 5 ft 10 in (1.78 m)
- Listed weight: 190 lb (86 kg)

Career information
- High school: San Jose (CA) Piedmont Hills
- College: Portland State
- NFL draft: 1996: undrafted

Career history

Playing
- Scottish Claymores (1997); San Jose SaberCats (1997–2001); New York Dragons (2002–2003); San Diego Riptide (2003)

Coaching
- San Diego Riptide (2005) (DC); Central Valley Coyotes (2006) (DC); Everett Hawks (2007) (OC); Tri-Cities Fever (2008) (OC); San Jose Wolves (2010) (OC); San Jose SaberCats (2011) (WR); San Jose (CA) Gunderson HS (2011–2013) (HC); San Jose (CA) Independence HS (2014–2018, 2020) (HC); Menlo-Atherton HS (2019) (HC); Santa Teresa HS (2021–present) (HC)

Awards and highlights
- 2× Second-team All-Arena (1999, 2000); 2× Don't Blink! Player of the Year (1998, 1999)

Career AFL statistics
- Receptions: 453
- Receiving yards: 5,521
- Receiving TDs: 83
- Rushing TDs: 45
- Return TDs: 24
- Stats at ArenaFan.com

Steve LeRoi Papin (born February 28, 1972) is an American former professional football offensive specialist who played seven seasons in the Arena Football League (AFL) with the San Jose SaberCats and New York Dragons. He first enrolled at West Valley College before transferring to Portland State University. Papin was also a member of the Scottish Claymores and San Diego Riptide.

== Early life ==
Papin attended Piedmont Hills High School in San Jose, California.

== College career ==
Papin played for the Portland State Vikings, finishing third in voting for the Harlon Hill Trophy his senior year in 1995 after recording 2,397 all-purpose yards.

== Professional career ==
Papin played for the Scottish Claymores of the World League of American Football in 1997. He played for the AFL's San Jose SaberCats from 1997 to 2001, earning Second Team All-Arena and Don't Blink! Player of the Year honors twice each. He was released by the SaberCats on December 19, 2001. Papin signed with the New York Dragons of the AFL on January 10, 2002. He was released by the Dragons on March 4, 2003. He finished his AFL career with 15,413 all-purpose yards for 152 touchdowns and an average of 14.7 yards per touch. Papin also averaged 200.4 all-purpose yards per game. He was a finalist for the Arena Football Hall of Fame in 2013 and 2014. He played in five games for the San Diego Riptide of the af2 in 2003 before suffering a knee injury.

== Coaching career ==
Papin was defensive coordinator for the San Diego Riptide in 2005. He served as defensive coordinator of the Central Valley Coyotes of the af2 in 2006. He was offensive coordinator of the af2's Everett Hawks in 2007. Papin served as offensive coordinator of the Tri-Cities Fever of the af2 in 2008. He was offensive coordinator for San Jose Wolves of the American Indoor Football Association in 2010. He was wide receivers coach of the San Jose SaberCats in 2011.

Papin served as head coach of the Gunderson High School Grizzlies of San Jose, California from 2011 to 2013. He stepped down as the Grizzlies coach in April 2014. He became head coach of the Independence High School 76ers in 2014. He left Independence to take the job at Menlo-Atherton High School for the 2019 season, but his contract was not renewed and he returned to Independence in 2020. Following the 2020 season, which had been postponed to the spring of 2021 due to the COVID-19 pandemic, Papin became the new head coach at Santa Teresa High School.

== Broadcasting career ==
In 2015, Papin was hired by CBS Sports Network as a sideline analyst for its coverage of the AFL.
