= LCPA =

LCPA may refer to:

- Latino College Preparatory Academy, a school in San Jose, California
- Lincoln Center for the Performing Arts, a complex of buildings in New York City
- Lincoln College Preparatory Academy, a school in the Kansas City, Missouri
