= Evergreen Valley High School =

Location
- 3300 Quimby Road; San Jose, California; United States; 37°19′27″N 121°46′44″W

Information
- School type: Public
- Established: 2002
- School district: East Side Union High School District
- Oversight: Western Association of Schools and Colleges
- Principal: Shelby Edwards
- Staff: 167
- Grades: 9-12
- Enrollment: 2,703 (2024-2025)
- Colors: Teal, black, white
- Mascot: Cougar
- Nickname: EVHS, EV
- Rival: Silver Creek High School
- Athletics conference: Blossom Valley Athletic League
- Website: evergreenvalleyhigh.esuhsd.org

Evergreen Valley High School is a comprehensive, 4-year high school located in the Evergreen area of San Jose, California, and is part of the East Side Union High School District. From 2007 to 2015, the school had a silver award on the U.S. News & World Report Best High Schools list.

== History ==
The school initially compromised seven buildings on 52 acres of land overlooking the Santa Clara Valley, built at a total cost of $82.6 million. It opened in 2002 as a "Small School", with an emphasis on technology and the idea that every student would have a laptop to take home for doing homework. Within the high school, four mostly independent schools operated: Science & Technology, Global Economy, Human Performance, and Humanities. At opening, the school offered only two grade levels and the campus was still unfinished, so classes took place in portables on two nearby campuses: Silver Creek High School and Mount Pleasant High School.

The campus officially opened for attendance in January 2003. Enrollment quickly approached its limit of 1,800 and petitions for shrunken boundaries and expansion circulated rapidly. On March 11, 2004, district trustees voted to construct a new building on campus to ease overcrowding. In 2006, construction began for the new science building.

Principals existed for each of the four of schools, and were supervised by a primary principal. However, due to change in district leadership and issues with funding and philosophy, in February 2004, the small school system was done away with, and the high school adopted a more traditional format.

== Academics ==
The school is ranked #1 in the East Side Union High School District and #10 in San Jose. In 2018, SFGate ranked it #15 among San Francisco Bay Area high schools sending students to Harvard University, Princeton University, and Massachusetts Institute of Technology.

=== Biotech Academy ===
To relieve overcrowding, the school opened Biotech Academy on the campus of Evergreen Valley College in 2004, offering a "small school" environment similar to EVHS's original model. However, the academy was closed in 2006 due to budget cuts and declining interest.

== Athletics ==
The school offers several athletic programs, including cross country, football, flag football, tennis, volleyball, water polo, basketball, soccer, wrestling, badminton, baseball, softball, swimming, cheerleading, track and field, and golf.

== Demographics ==
School Year	Asian	Hispanic	White	African American	Pacific Islander	Native American
2005–06	57%	24%	14%	4%	—	0.3%
2008–09	60%	24%	10%	4%	1%	0.3%
2013–14	61%	20%	6%	2%	1%	—
2014–15	68%	20%	7%	2%	0.5%	—
2024–25	77%	15%	3%	0.6%	0.1%	—

== Controversy ==
=== 2009 swastika incident ===
Overnight between March 14 and 15, 2009, a 20-foot swastika was etched on a lawn and several trees were cut down.

=== 2009 mailed substance incident ===
On March 17, 2009, an envelope was mailed to the school containing white powder and a letter expressing dissatisfaction over the school's dress code policy regarding hats. The administrative building was evacuated, and classes for that day were not affected. Emergency crews were dispatched to the school, but further investigation revealed that the substance was baby powder.

== Notable alumni ==
- Brandon Dang, artistic gymnast
- Sneha Revanur, activist
- Jason Romero, professional soccer player
- Matt Stonie, competitive eater
- Justin Suh, professional golfer
