= Revanur =

Revanur may refer to:

- Sneha Revanur (born 2004), Indian-American activist
- Swetha Revanur (born 1998), winner of student science fair
- 32072 Revanur, minor planet named for Swetha Revanur
