= Apollo High School =

Apollo High School refers to:

== In India ==
- Apollo High School (Bangalore) in HeganaHalli Famous School of Manjunath.V

== In the United States ==
- Apollo High School (Arizona), Glendale, Arizona
- Apollo High School (Kentucky), Owensboro, Kentucky
- Apollo High School (Minnesota), St. Cloud, Minnesota
- Apollo High School (Pennsylvania), Apollo, Pennsylvania
- Apollo High School (San Jose, California)
- Apollo High School (Simi Valley, California)
