= Hill High School =

Hill High School may refer to:

- Hill High School, a former school in Newcastle, Australia
- Hill High School, a former school for African Americans in LaFayette, Georgia
- Andrew P. Hill High School in San Jose, California
- The Hill School in Pottstown, Pennsylvania
