= San Jose Conservation Corps =

San Jose Conservation Corps and Charter School (SJCCCS)
- San Jose, California 95132

Information
- School type: Charter, magnet high school
- Founded: 1987
- School district: East Side Union High School District
- Staff: 7
- Grades: K–12
- Enrollment: 100 (2014)
- Language: English
- Campus: Suburban
- Color: Black
- Athletics conference: Blossom Valley Athletic League; California Interscholastic Federation; Central Coast Section
- Website: www.sjcccharterschool.org

The San Jose Conservation Corps (SJCC) is a youth job training and education program in San Jose, California, open to people from 17.5–27 years of age who need job training and/or completion of their high school diploma.

The SJCC was founded in 1987, and since then has provided education and training for more than 17,000 "at-risk" disadvantaged young people. The training programs offered include leadership, communication, computer literacy, and employment training. The San Jose Conservation Corps and Charter School is a non-profit organization with four divisions: the Charter School/Academy, Environmental Projects, Recycling, and Food Security.
