= Bob LaMonte =

American sports agent

Bob LaMonte is an American sports agent who works primarily with National Football League coaches and executives. He is the founder and president of Professional Sports Representation, Inc. Early on LaMonte also represented college coaches and Major League Baseball and NFL players. In 2018, included in his fifty-one clients represented were eight NFL head coaches and eight NFL general managers. In 2020, LaMonte represented three of the Top Ten NFL's Highest Paid Coaches according to sportingnews.com. Thus far LaMonte has negotiated over $3 billion in coaching contracts throughout his 40-plus year career and has been regarded as one of the most powerful coaching agents in the NFL, whose negotiations have helped change the pay-scales of the NFL coach.

== Biography ==
LaMonte graduated from the Santa Clara University in 1968. He was a nose tackle on the varsity football team in 1964 and 1965. In 1970, he received a master's degree in diplomatic history from San Jose State University. Lamonte taught history at Oak Grove High School until 1973, and moved on to teach at Santa Teresa High School until 1992. He was part of the coaching staff of the football programs at both schools. In 1981, one of his former students, Rich Campbell, asked him to represent him as Campbell would go on to be selected in the first round of the 1981 NFL draft by the Green Bay Packers. He would represent former San Francisco Bay Area athletes including Dave Stieb, Robin White, Mervyn Fernandez, and Nick Vanos. On March 8, 1985, LaMonte negotiated the longest baseball contract at the time with the Toronto Blue Jays for Stieb. In 1992, Mike Holmgren asked LaMonte to represent him to negotiate a deal for the heading coaching position for the Green Bay Packers. He retired from teaching that year, and moved on to focus on representing NFL coaches, and would help expand the role of NFL head coaches by also being involved in personnel decisions. Already the head football coach of the Philadelphia Eagles since 1999, LaMonte negotiated a contract to expand the duties of his client, Andy Reid, to become executive VP of football operations.

== Books ==
LaMonte's book on leadership, entitled Winning the NFL Way, was released on July 20, 2004.
