= East Side Union High School District =

Public high school district in San Jose, California, United States

Address
- 830 North Capitol Avenue San Jose, California, 95133; United States

District information
- Type: Public
- Grades: K–12
- NCES District ID: 0611820

Students and staff
- Students: 22,488 (2020–2021)
- Teachers: 959.63 (FTE)
- Staff: 751.63 (FTE)
- Student–teacher ratio: 23.43:1

Other information
- Website: www.esuhsd.org

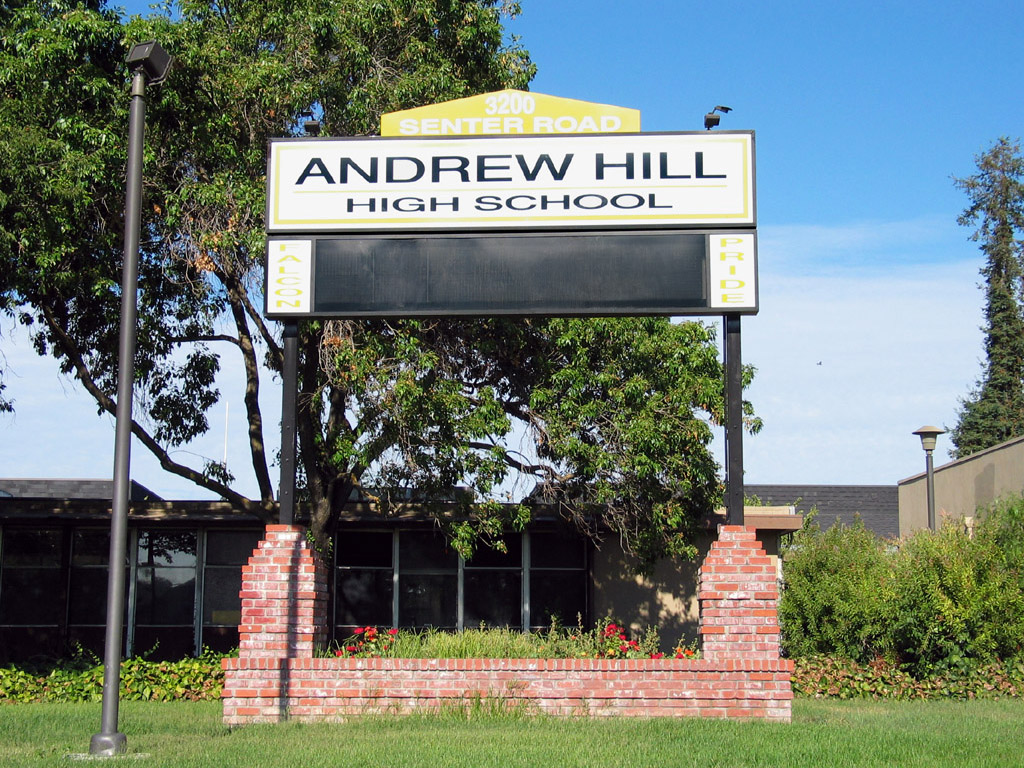
Andrew Hill High School

The East Side Union High School District (abbreviated as ESUHSD) is a school district in San Jose, California, serving the East Side, Berryessa, and South of San Jose. ESUHSD administers 19 high schools with a combined enrollment of approximately 24,500 students in the area of San Jose, Santa Clara County, California. The schools include 11 comprehensive or traditional and 7 alternative high school programs. An Adult Education Program serves an additional 26,000 students.

== Schools in service ==
The district currently operates the following high schools (Data entered from California Department of Education SARC reports):

School Facts
School name	Students	FTE Teachers	Pupil/Teacher Ratio	Type of School
Andrew P. Hill High School	2271	103	22	Traditional
Apollo High School	107	5	21	Alternative
East Side Cadet Academy	79	4	19.8	Alternative
Escuela Popular Accelerated Family Learning	180	13.5	13.3	Charter
Evergreen Valley High School	2601	103	25	Traditional
Foothill High School	404	21	19	Alternative
Genesis High School	71	5	14.2	Alternative
Independence High School	3436	155	22	Traditional
KIPP San Jose Collegiate	499			Charter
James Lick High School	1390	68	20	Traditional
Latino College Preparatory Academy	201	9.8	20.5	Charter
MACSA Academia Calmecac	92	7.4	12.4	Charter
Mount Pleasant High School	1831	85	22	Traditional
Oak Grove High School	2442	112	22	Traditional
Pegasus High School	80	5	16	Alternative
Phoenix High School	80	4	20	Alternative
Piedmont Hills High School	2195	93	24	Traditional
San Jose Conservation Corps	100	5.2	19.2	Charter
Santa Teresa High School	2373	100	24	Traditional
Silver Creek High School	2443	106	23	Traditional
William C. Overfelt High School	1730	84	21	Traditional
Yerba Buena High School	1706	81	20	Traditional

== Employee housing proposal ==
In 2019 the district proposed to voters a housing complex for teachers because of the high cost of living in the area. In a 2020 referendum, voters rejected a bond measure to fund the housing construction.
