= Reggie Bynum =

American football player (born 1964)

No. 88, 81, 80
- Position: Wide receiver

Personal information
- Born: February 10, 1964 (age 62); Greenville, Mississippi, U.S.
- Listed height: 6 ft 1 in (1.85 m)
- Listed weight: 185 lb (84 kg)

Career information
- High school: Independence (San Jose, California)
- College: Oregon State
- NFL draft: 1986: 9th round, 222nd overall pick

Career history
- Buffalo Bills (1987); Hamilton Tiger-Cats (1989); San Francisco 49ers (1990)*; Montreal Machine (1992)
- * Offseason or practice squad member only

Awards and highlights
- Second-team All-American (1985); 2× First-team All-Pac-10 (1984, 1985); Second-team All-Pac-10 (1983)

Career NFL statistics
- Receptions: 2
- Receiving yards: 24
- Stats at Pro Football Reference

Reginald Deshain Bynum (born February 10, 1964) is an American former professional football player who was a wide receiver in the National Football League (NFL) and the World League of American Football (WLAF).

Bynum was born in Greenville, Mississippi and attended Independence High School in San Jose, California. He played college football at Oregon State, where he was a second-team All-American as a senior.

Bynum was selected by the Buffalo Bills in the ninth round of the 1986 NFL draft. He appeared in one game for the Bills, with two receptions for 24 yards.

He also spent time with the Montreal Machine of the WLAF in 1992.
