= Arena Football on CBS =

- Presented by: Sherdrick Bonner; Randy Gatewood; Anthony Herron; Ben Holden; Steve Papin; Brent Stover; Ari Wolfe
- Country of origin: United States
- Original language: English
- No. of seasons: 6

Production
- Camera setup: Multi-camera
- Running time: 180 minutes or until end of game
- Production company: CBS Sports

Original release
- Network: CBS; CBS Sports Network
- Release: 2013 – 2018

CBS Arena Football is a TV program from CBS Sports that broadcast Arena Football League games from 2013 to 2018. As part of a two-year agreement, the CBS Sports Network aired nineteen regular season games and two playoff games. When CBS aired ArenaBowl XXVI, it marked the first time since 2008 that the league's finale aired on network television.

== Coverage breakdown ==
Regular season CBSSN broadcast games were usually on Saturday nights. As the games were shown live, the start times were not uniform as with most football broadcast packages, but varied with the time zone in which the home team was located. This meant that the AFL may have appeared either prior to or following the CBSSN's featured Major League Lacrosse game.

For the 2017 season, one AFL game per week was broadcast live nationally over CBS Sports Network. In 2017, the AFL also began streaming some games on Twitter and AFLNow, the league's streaming service. For the 2018 season, the AFL's sole national English language telecast partner was the CBS Sports Network, but all games were streamed free online and Brigade and Valor games were available over their owner Ted Leonsis' Monumental Sports Network.

The network signed an agreement to carry the playoff tournament of the league's 2024 revival in July of that year.

== Former commentators ==
- Sherdrick Bonner (color commentator, also with ESPN, now with the Billings Outlaws)
- Andrew Catalon (play-by-play)
- Randy Gatewood (sideline report)
- Anthony Herron (color commentator, now with ESPN)
- Ben Holden (play-by-play)
- Steve Papin (sideline reporter)
- Brent Stover (lead play-by-play)
- Ari Wolfe (lead play-by-play, now with ESPN)
