= Latino College Preparatory Academy =

Location
- 14271 Story Road; San Jose, California 95133
- Coordinates: 37.359018°N 121.816059°W

Information
- School type: Charter, high school
- Founded: 2001
- School district: East Side Union High School District
- School code: 43694274330668
- Principal: Jesus Rios
- Staff: 16
- Grades: 9–12
- Enrollment: 440 (2016-17)
- Language: English
- Campus: Suburban
- Colors: Black and yellow
- Athletics conference: Blossom Valley Athletic League; California Interscholastic Federation; Central Coast Section
- Website: http://sjlcpa.org

Latino College Preparatory Academy (LCPA) is a chartered high school in San Jose, California.

== Biography ==
It is situated within the East Side Union High School District, and specializes in providing a college preparatory environment for nearly 500 high school students from Spanish-speaking homes. The school is no longer operated by the National Hispanic University. Dr. Roberto Cruz was one of the main creators of this academy, his motivation was the necessity to motivate and help young Latinos enter postsecondary education, in 1998, Latinos represented 9.6 percent of the undergraduate population, which was Dr. Cruz main concern. Latino College Prep was then founded in 2001.

== History ==
State test results for academic year 2005-06 showed significant improvements across all grades and subjects. The senior and sophomore classes doubled their scores on English language proficiency tests, beating state and county averages. It was particularly significant given the school is designed for English language learners. The results for the 2009-10 academic year showed dramatic increases, raising the school's API from 614 to 671. This included passing rates in 9th grade English that increased 131%.

The school newspaper, AQUI LCPA, a bilingual monthly tabloid, came in tenth place in the 2006 National Scholastic Press Awards for its special reports package on crystal meth abuse. This was the first time in 30 years a first-year newspaper has won one of the top prizes in the annual Best of Show competition; the first time a small newspaper has placed; and the first time a newspaper not printed on newsprint has won.

LCPA's poetry club competes in events around Silicon Valley. The boys' soccer team won the 2006 Central Coast Section championship.
