= Apollo High School (San Jose, California) =

Public school in California, United States

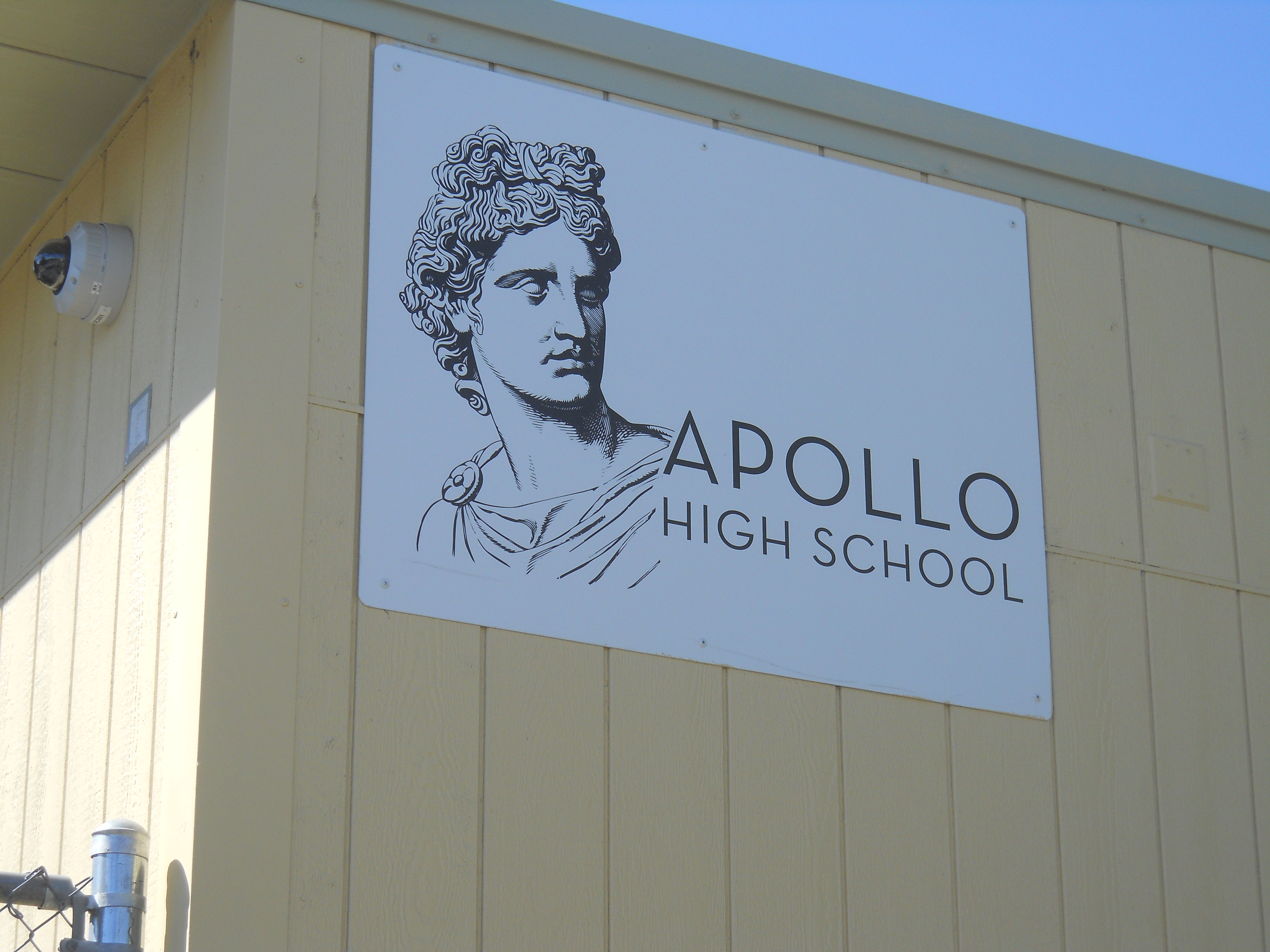

Location
- 1835 Cunningham Ave. San Jose, California 95122; United States; 37°19′53″N 121°49′54″W

Information
- Type: Alternative Public High School
- Opened: September 25, 1995
- School district: East Side Union High School District
- NCES District ID: 06643
- Principal: Yovi Murillo
- Teaching staff: 7.96 (FTE)
- Grades: 11 to 12
- Gender: coed
- Enrollment: 129 (2023–2024)
- Student to teacher ratio: 16.21
- Campus type: Suburban
- Website: apollo.esuhsd.org

Apollo High School is an alternative high school in San Jose, California, one of four in the East Side Union High School District. It opened in 1995 and is located on the campus of William C. Overfelt High School in East San Jose; the principal is Yovi Murillo.

== School ==
Apollo High School is an alternative high school for 11th and 12th grade students from the East Side Union High School District in San Jose, California, one of four referred to by the district as Small But Necessary schools. The school is housed on the campus of Overfelt High School, where it has its own group of portable buildings, with a capacity of 160 (originally 80). It is a State Model Continuation School.

Students enroll voluntarily, unlike at a continuation school, and attend either morning or afternoon sessions, each of which consists of four homeroom classes. Students must make up absences in evening, Saturday, or break meetings. In the 2014–2015 school year, 40 students were enrolled in 11th grade and 116 in 12th grade, of whom 87% were Hispanic or Latino, 11.5% were other racial or ethnic minorities, 1.3% were white, 20.5% were English learners, and 94% were socio-economically disadvantaged. In May 2017, 74 students graduated.

== Extracurricular activities ==
In 2013 the school's robotics team, the Illuminators, won a place at the finals of the FIRST Robotics Competition in St. Louis, Missouri. In 2017 it was the only alternative school to have a team.
