= Independence High School (San Jose, California) =

Location
- 617 North Jackson Avenue; San Jose, California 95133; United States; 37°22′20.79″N 121°51′32.71″W

Information
- School type: Public, magnet high school
- Opened: September 8, 1976
- School district: East Side Union High School District
- Principal: Amy Hanna
- Staff: 166
- Teaching staff: 112.66 (FTE)
- Grades: 9–12
- Enrollment: 2,368 (2023-2024)
- Student to teacher ratio: 21.02
- Language: English
- Campus: Suburban
- Colors: Red, white and blue
- Athletics conference: Blossom Valley Athletic League; California Interscholastic Federation; Central Coast Section
- Mascot: Sammy the Sixer
- Team name: 76ers
- Website: independence.esuhsd.org

Independence High School, also referred to as IHS, is a public high school located in the Berryessa district of San Jose, California, United States. The school is operated by the East Side Union High School District (ESUHSD). Its namesake is the United States Declaration of Independence, which celebrated its bicentennial in the same year Independence High was established in 1976.

Independence is considered a magnet school, and it hosts three California Partnership Academies: Finance, Space Technology Engineering Academy Magnet (STEAM), and Teaching.

Independence students are called "sixers" and their mascots are named "Sammy the Sixer," who is an interpretation of an American Founding Father, George Washington, and "Amerigo the Eagle," who is a Bald Eagle, America's national bird.

== Population ==
=== Demographics ===
Out of the twelve high schools ESUHSD operates, Independence services the largest student population, with 2,368 students as of the 2023–2024 school year. Out of these, 2.7% identified as White, 2.2% identified as African-American, 38.0% identified as Hispanic or Latino, 36.2% identified as Asian, 15.8% identified as Filipino, 0.3% identified as American Indian or Alaska Native, 1.0% identified as Pacific Islander, and 2.4% identified as two or more races. 21.5% of students were identified as English learners.

=== Class size ===
As of the 2022–23 school year, the pupil-teacher ratio was 21.92 to 1, with 94.4% of teachers being fully credentialed; as of the same time, the full-time equivalent of Independence's teachers is 157.4. Class size at Independence is an average of 26.8 students.

== Campus ==
Frank Fiscalini, the then-superintendent of the East Side Union High School District, conceived of a singular "super" campus which simultaneously functioned as a community center. This concept replaced three planned schools, which would've been racially imbalanced due to residential segregation. The singular campus drew from a wider area of students, creating a racially diverse school body without the need for desegregation busing.

Independence High School consists of over fifty buildings, each labeled with a specific letter. The four primary groups of buildings are referred to as the villas, including A-Villa (American Hall), which includes the school bank; B-Villa (Bicentennial Hall); C-Villa (Constitution Hall), which includes the disciplinary committee; and D-Villa (Democracy Hall). During the fall of 2005, E-Villa (Eagle Hall) was removed indefinitely, only to be used as the name place for all music rooms. All villas are architecturally identical and surround a concrete clock tower in the middle of the school.

From 1976 to 1979, the Independence High gym hosted San Jose State University men's basketball games.

Other academic structures include complexes also labeled with letters, including the G-Complex, housing art classes; M-Complex, housing industrial classes; and the P-Complex, which are portable buildings currently in use by KIPP, which runs a charter school on campus called KIPP San Jose Collegiate. Independence also shares its campus with ACE Charter High School and Pegasus High School (alternative school). Pegasus uses what used to be known as the L- Complex. ACE moved into the H-Complex and shares the K-Complex with science classes that are part of Independence. In the summer before 2014–2015, Independence's administration office moved from the H-Complex to the N-Complex when they were rebuilding it after a fire damaged the complex. Along with the new administration offices, the school built a student center that quickly became popular with the students. B-Villa's main building was also affected by a fire in 2013 and opened for the 2016–2017 school year.

Along with a now-defunct planetarium, the school also houses Olympic-sized racing and diving pools, as well as an Olympic-regulation track. The Luis Valdez Center for the Performing Art went under construction in the summer of 2014. In the beginning of the 2012–2013 school year, the district gave all the high schools artificial grass fields in the stadium. Independence also contains seven tennis courts, four baseball fields, and two gymnasiums. In February 2024, the Student Union building was opened. It has a cafeteria, a learning center with a library, and the attendance/counseling office were moved there.

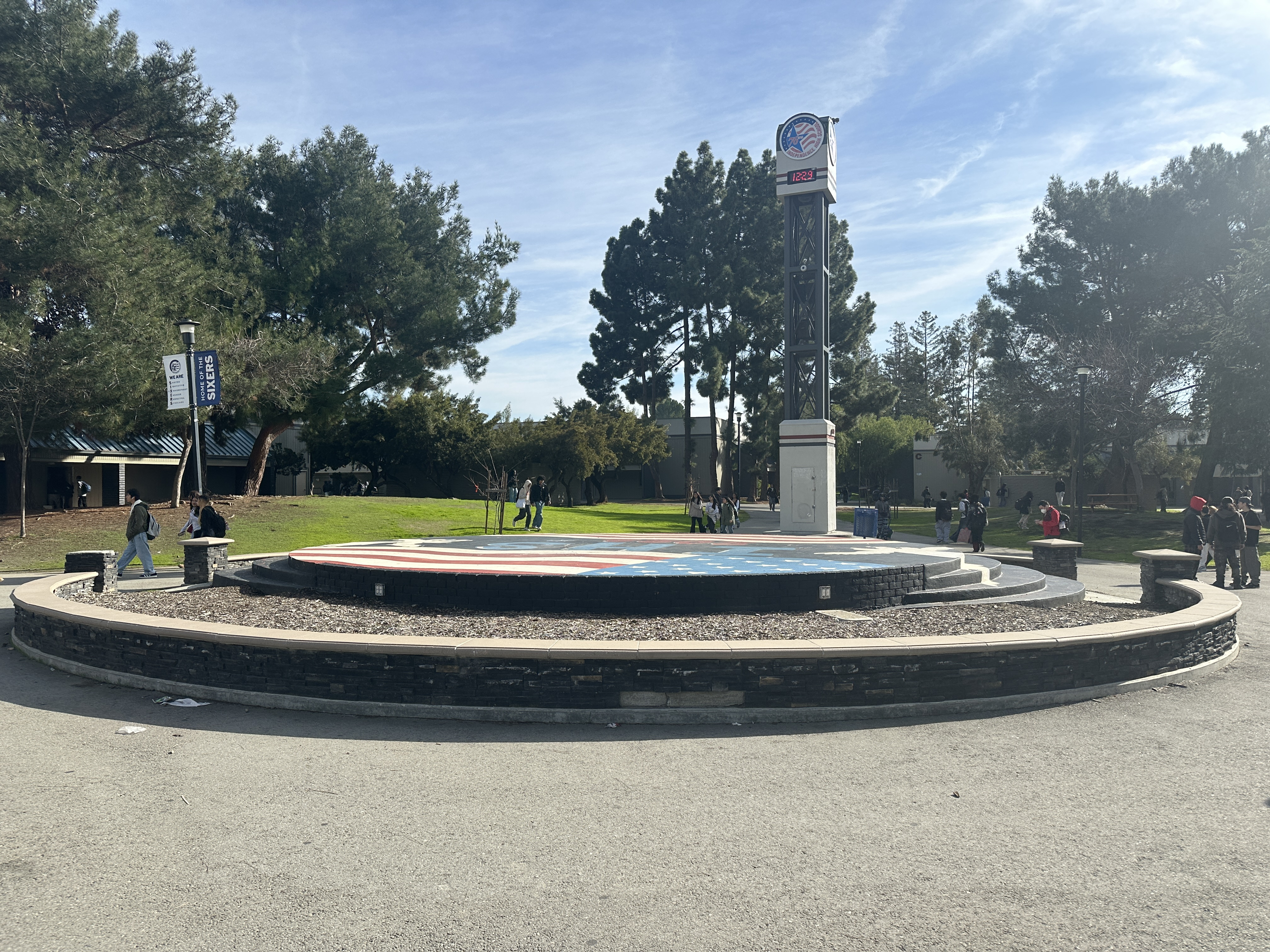
Independence High School Quad

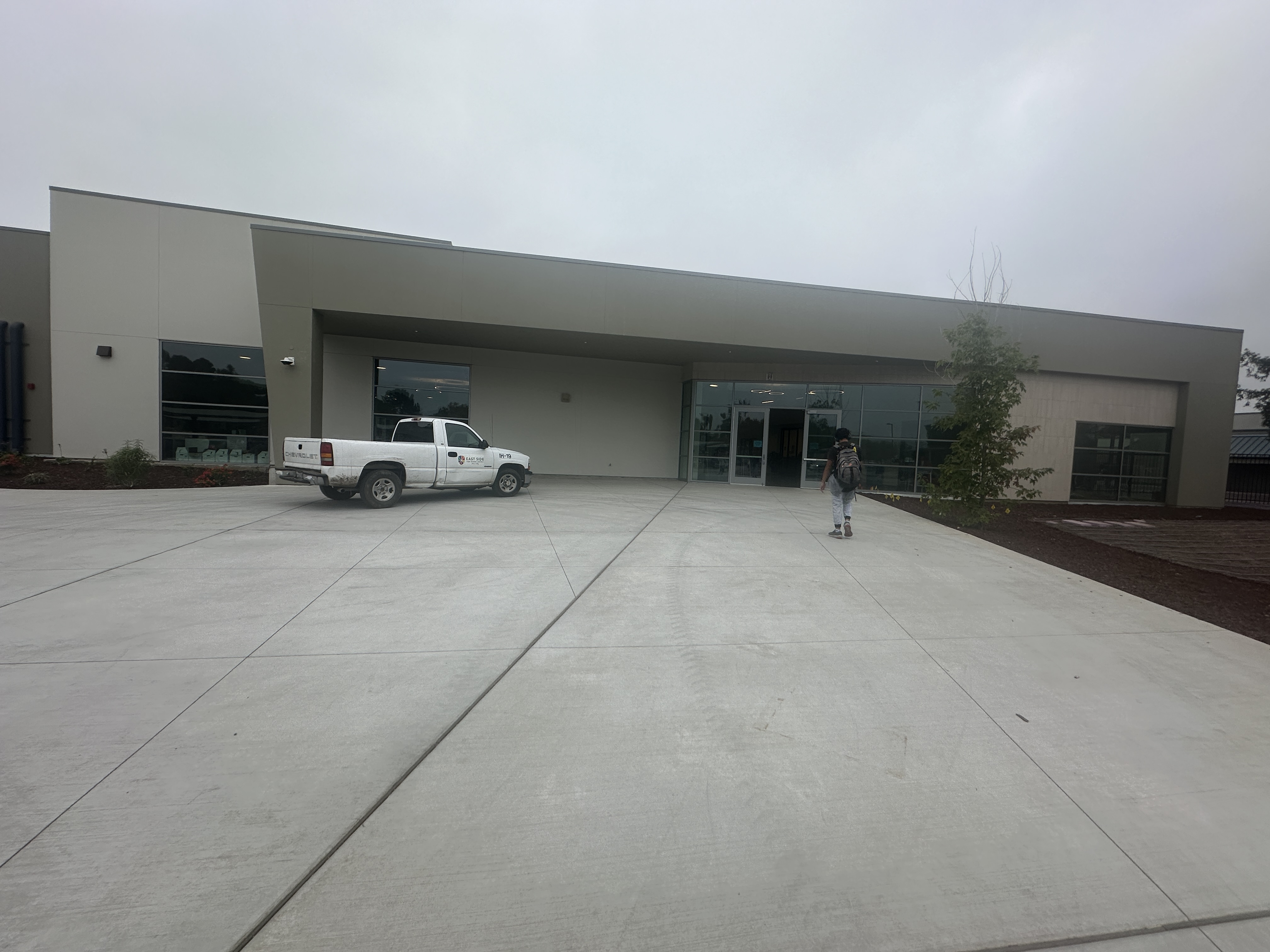
Exterior of the Student Union building

== Extracurriculars ==
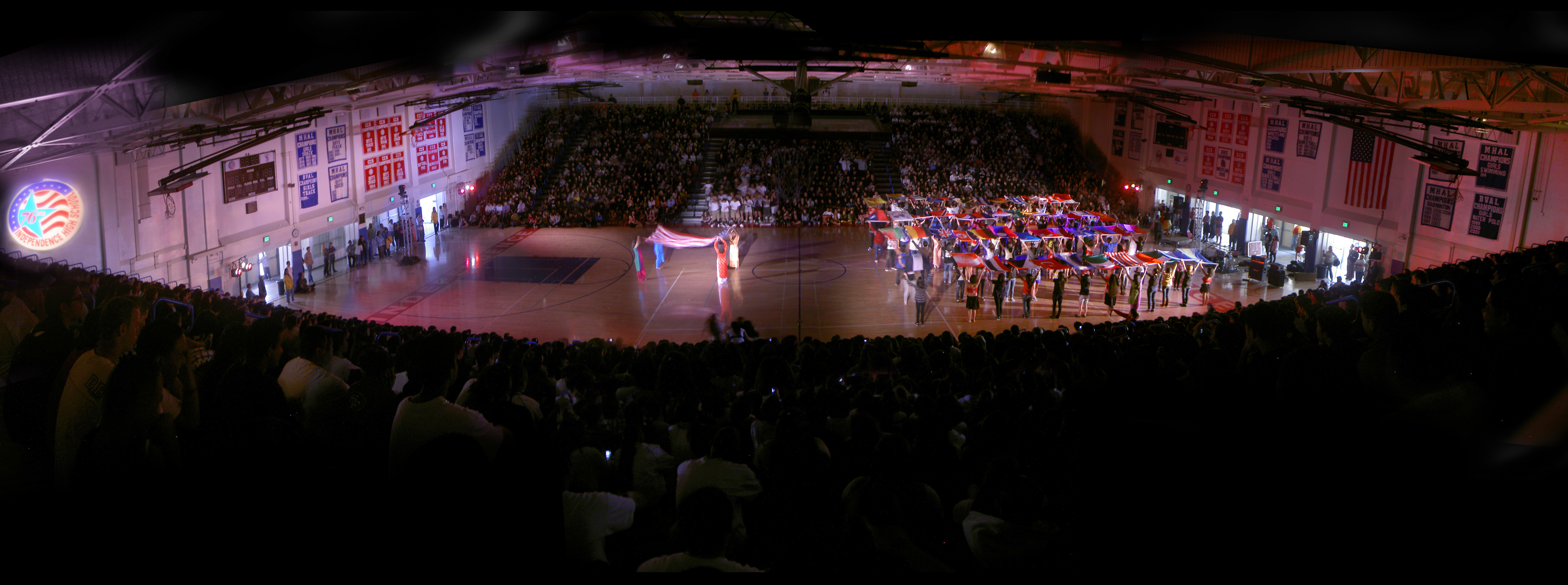
Independence High School's Flag Ceremony during its 2009 Multicultural Assembly.

=== Yearbook ===
The American was Independence High School's Columbia Scholastic Press Association Gold- and Silver Crown-winning yearbook. In 2008, Independence High School confirmed that The American would cease publication due to debt accumulation and budget problems. In 2011 the school yearbook returned, using a site called MBROSIA, the students would be able to get a hard copy of their yearbook for their friends to sign, while also getting an online yearbook. In 2012 the school started using a different program with the company, Herff Jones.

Yearbook was once a class at Independence, but was later removed due to lack of interest. In 2019, Yearbook Club was created by Editor-in-Chief, Katie Tran. Yearbook was produced by the club from 2019 to 2022. In the 2022–2023 school year, the Journalism class, re-established in 2021, took control of the creation of the yearbook. The class creates the yearbook in tandem with publishing the school's own student-led newspaper, The Indy Insider. The class’ name changed to Journalism/Yearbook, now led by their advisor, Graham Haworth.

Past yearbooks have been titled the following: Written in the Stars (2018), Images (2019), Envision in 20/20 (2020), Just A Glitch (2021), After the Rain (2022) and All Decked Out (2023).

=== Newspapers ===
Until the late 1980s, a student newspaper titled the Declaration of Independence was distributed throughout the school, though it eventually ceased publication. During the mid '80s into the 1990s the school newspaper carried the name The Liberty. In 2004, three student papers—including The Independent Voice, The Independent Times, and a revived Declaration of Independence—were almost simultaneously founded, though by 2006 only The Independent Voice had any significant representation in the school. During the 2009–2010 school year, The Independent Voice was the school's sole student-run, monthly newspaper, distributed throughout the school to selected classrooms and villas. During the 2017–2018 school year, Graham Haworth, an English teacher, re-established an official school newspaper called the Common Sense. The publication is uploaded to the school website by the journalism class. All publication and equipment costs are funded solely through fundraisers and advertisement sales. Written and published entirely by students and Haworth, the school newspaper was re-established as The Indy Insider in 2020.

=== Band and orchestra ===
Independence High School's instrumental program, led by Kenneth Ponticelli, includes (as of 2023–2024) Orchestra (the two previously distinct Orchestra 1 and 2-4 classes were merged starting in the 2020–2021 school year) Symphonic Band, and Wind Ensemble.

The Marching Band was founded under the direction of Bob Russell and Dan Smith. They found early success by defeating the powerhouse and former National Champion Emerald Regime from Live Oak High School (Morgan Hill, CA). In 1979, the 76th Cavalry band made their first trip to Whitewater, Wisconsin to compete at the Marching Band of America National Championship. The band completed their first undefeated season by capturing the MBA National Championship Title in 1981. Their repertoire was "Light Cavalry Overture" (Franz von Suppé), "Imaginary Voyage" (Jean-Luc Ponty), "Sud de la Ciudad Del Oro" (Mike Smith), "She Believes in Me" (Steve Gibb), "Fanfare for the Common Man" (Aaron Copland), "Simple Gifts/Appalachian Spring" (Aaron Copland/Elder Joseph Brackett). From there, the 76th Cavalry went on a winning streak and went undefeated for three more years.

The band made a comeback in 2005 with a show entitled "The Art Of War", placing third overall in WBA class A, AA, and AAA Championships at Johansen High School in Modesto, California. In 2006, the 76th Cavalry became Class AA Champion with a performance of Antonín Dvořák's New World Symphony, garnering 85.85 points at preliminaries and 87.69 at the finals—the first championships the Cavalry had won since 1981. The 76th Cavalry placed fourth in the overall A/AA/AAA classification. In 2007, the 76th Cavalry became Class AA Champion once again with a score of 82.5. This allowed them to advance into finals with all other A, AA, and AAA bands, where they placed fifth overall with a score of 84.1. In 2008, the 76th Cavalry placed second in Class A with a score of 80.40, clinching High General Effect and High Auxiliary captions with their show entitled "The Gathering, Selection by Rachmaninoff". In 2009, the band again took second place with a performance of Sergei Prokofiev's music from the ballet Romeo and Juliet with a score of 85.25; also earning High Percussion and High Auxiliary. They moved onto A, AA, AAA Finals, and placed 4th overall with a score of 88.10.

The 76th Cavalry has also been invited to London in Winter 2009 to play in a New Year's parade. In 2015, the band's performance of Steven Reineke's composition, "The Witch and the Saint" took second place in Class A once again with a score of 82.65, breaking 80 for the first time in 6 years. As of the 2015 season, the Cavalry's color guard section remained undefeated in their class (Winter season included) for three full years. In 2017, the Cavalry brought back a win as Class A Champions with a score of 83.70, the cavalry's highest score since 2009, and first win since 2007. The show was entitled "Elements" and featured the music of Brian Balmages and Gustav Holst. The Cavalry achieved the high visual award, and the color guard captured High Auxiliary, sustaining their streak of achievement. As with most WBA bands, the band went digital for the 2020 marching season, but returned for the 2021 season. Following the 2021 marching season, the 76th Cavalry became a AA band with their show "Indyverse" and received second place in WBA Championships with a score of 81.95.

The Wind Ensemble have placed first in their division in many Heritage Festivals. During spring break of 2007, the Wind Ensemble went to the New York Heritage Festival and took firs with a score of 85.60. in their division, along with winning an Adjudicator's Award for a score over 92, and another award for receiving the highest score of all the instrumental groups at the festival. They brought home two trophies and a plaque, along with an invitation to the 2008 Gold Festival in Boston. The Wind Ensemble has taken a Unanimous Superior in the CMEA Festivals for the past 3 years (2006, 2007, and 2008). They have also been invited to play in many places around the world, including Britain. Australia, and China.

=== Dance ===
Dance classes offered at Independence include Jazz Dance, Ballet, Modern Dance, Theatre Dance (also known as IndepenDANCE, Independence's student-run audition-only dance company). Ballet and Cheerleading are taught and coached by Cristina McClelland, Modern Dance is taught by Kellye Dodd, and Jazz and Theatre Dance are joint efforts. Independence is the only public high school that has Ballet course in entire California. Every year, the Jazz Dance classes perform at a school rally, while IndepenDANCE and the Spirit Squad performs several rallies throughout the year. The IndepenDANCE team holds a performance annually. Originally, Jazz Dance 1 was offered as physical education credit for students who had passed swim tests; however, Independence High School discontinued this practice in fall 2006, though Jazz Dance 1 may still be taken for the East Side Union High School District's performing arts graduation requirement.

=== Athletics ===
Most sports teams are divided among junior varsity and varsity teams, though Independence is one of the schools in the BVAL that does not offer a field hockey team.

- Wrestling State title in 1995

== Notable alumni ==
- Reggie Bynum, former NFL wide receiver
- Alana Evans, adult film actress
- Eric Guerrero, three time NCAA wrestling Champion and 2004 Olympian
- Khaled Hosseini, author of The Kite Runner and A Thousand Splendid Suns
- Neil Kaplan, voice actor
- Pamela Martinez, professional wrestler, better known by her ring name Bayley
- Sandra McCoy, actress and dancer
- Mekenna Melvin, actress
- Afsoon Roshanzamir, 1st world medalist of USA Women's Freestyle Wrestling and 2016 Olympic US women's wrestling coach
- John Tuggle, National Football League Player, member of the 1983 New York Giants, drafted with the final pick (nicknamed Mr. Irrelevant) of the 1983 NFL draft.
- Ashley Urbanski, professional wrestler, better known by her ring name Shotzi Blackheart
- Thuy Vu, broadcast journalist and TV host
- Rex Walters, National Basketball Association Player
