= Thuy Vu =

American-Vietnamese Journalist, anchor and reporter

- Born: Vietnam
- Education: University of California, Berkeley
- Occupation: broadcast journalist
- Awards: Seven Emmy Awards; Edward R. Murrow award

Thuy Vu is a Vietnamese-American journalist, anchor, reporter and international corporate business mentor. Vu is the Co-founder and President of Global Mentor Network. Vu is a seven-time Emmy Award winner and recipient of an Edward R. Murrow award. She was named by the San Jose Mercury News and East Bay Times as one of the San Francisco Bay Area's most Inspiring Women. Vu has been interviewed by numerous media outlets, including the New York Times, CNN, CBS-5, San Francisco Chronicle, and Bay Area News Group.

== Early life and education ==
Thuy Vu was born in Vietnam. In 1975, she emigrated from Vietnam after Saigon fell to the Viet Minh communist regime at the end of the Vietnam War. She fled the country with her family by boat and settled in Duluth, Minnesota. She is a 1985 graduate of Independence High School in San Jose, California. In 1992 she earned a bachelor's degree with honors in rhetoric from the University of California, Berkeley.

== Career ==
Vu began her journalism career in public radio at KQED-FM in San Francisco and National Public Radio where she first covered Congress and national politics in Washington, D.C. before returning to their San Francisco bureau. Vu was at KPIX for four years as a reporter and fill-in anchor in the 1990s. She also reported at KTVU. Vu joined ABC7 News in August 2000 as co-anchor of the ABC7 Sunday Morning News at 7 a.m. and 9 a.m. She's also a reporter based in the South Bay Bureau. She joined CBS in December 2005, working out of the San Jose bureau, and remained with CBS in various capacities until 2012. She was an Emmy award-winning news anchor and reporter for CBS-5 "Eyewitness News" in San Francisco. She co-hosted the final year of KPIX's "Eye on the Bay" until original production ceased in May 2012. Since September 2012, Vu has been a Multimedia Communications Instructor at Academy of Art University in San Francisco and a board member of the Asian Pacific Fund. In 2013, she was the host of Link TV's LinkAsia news program, which is also broadcast on PBS. She hosted the program until August 2014. Also in 2013, she began as host of the program KQED Newsroom on KQED-TV in San Francisco. She hosted the program until June 2019.

== Awards and honors ==
Vu has received numerous awards from both regional and national organizations for her reporting. In 2010, Vu was honored as "Outstanding Reporter & correspondent by the National Alliance for Women in Media"; in 2011, she won the Edward R. Murrow award; and in 2015, was also awarded the 2015 Berkeley's "Bill and Patrice Brandt Alumni Leadership Award" by the Institute of Government Studies - UC Berkeley in their annual Leadership Award Recipients ceremony. The American Women in Radio and Television also honored her as the Best Reporter in the Bay Area. She won two national awards from the Asian American Journalists Association. She has also won honors from the Public Radio News Directors Association. She also earned Emmy and Associated Press awards for a feature on the 30th anniversary of the Operation Babylift flights at the end of the Vietnam war and co-anchored live coverage of the fatal tiger attack at the San Francisco Zoo in December 2007 and for her investigation of safety problems at California's amusement parks.
