= National Hispanic University =

Private university in San Jose, California, US

- National Hispanic University logo
- Type: Private
- Active: 1981–2015
- Parent institution: Laureate International Universities
- President: David P. López
- Provost: Gladys Ato
- Academic staff: 12 full-time, 60 part-time
- Students: 700
- Location: San Jose, California, United States; 37°21′33″N 121°48′58″W
- Campus: Urban
- Mascot: Golden Eagles
- Website: www.nhu.edu

The National Hispanic University (NHU) was a small, private university located in San Jose, California, United States. Founded by Wichita State University and UC Berkeley graduate Dr. B. Roberto Cruz, it was the first four-year Latino university in the United States. NHU's vision was to foster "a caring learning environment where students have felt valued and supported at every step in their academic journey. Embracing diversity and multiple perspectives as guiding principles." National Hispanic University ceased operations on August 23, 2015.

== History ==
The National Hispanic University was founded in 1981 in Oakland, California, to address the needs of Hispanic men and women, particularly those who are first in their families to attend college. Founder Dr. Roberto Cruz, a Texas native and first-generation college graduate, had studied the disproportionately large impact historically black colleges and universities had in generating both undergraduate and professional degree graduates within the Black community. Predicting that the Latinos would be the largest population in California, Dr. Cruz's vision was to have a similarly positive impact on the Hispanic community in the United States and to create an institution that served their particular needs.

In 1990, the university opened a San Jose campus and moved to a larger facility in Oakland. In 1994, NHU closed both campuses and moved to a new campus in East San Jose.

For several years, National Hispanic University published an annual report card on Hispanic quality of life. From 1981 to 1986, NHU also published reports on women of La Raza, Cesar Chavez, bilingual special education, Las Posadas, and "Steps to Humanity."

To better serve local youth, NHU established an Upward Bound program in Oakland.

=== Campus ===
NHU was located in a predominantly Latino and working-class neighborhood in the San Jose foothills. In its inception, all of the classrooms and offices were located into one building.

=== Accreditation ===
The university was accredited by WASC and was rated by the Carnegie Foundation for the Advancement of Teaching as a "Baccalaureate College", with an academic breadth rated as "Diverse Fields"

== School closure ==
With so many students in need of financial support, NHU also struggled to stay afloat, especially after its founder, Cruz, died of cancer in 2002. In the 2000s, NHU was unsuccessful in its many attempts to find financial backers from Silicon Valley or Latino philanthropists who could save the school. After those options were closed, the school reached a deal with Laureate Education. In 2010, NHU became a member of the Laureate International Universities network, a for-profit college chain. Laureate hoped to turn NHU into a mostly online school; however, the institution lost federal and state funding partly due to its new for-profit status. Laureate officially closed National Hispanic University on August 23, 2015.

When Laureate made the decision to abandon National Hispanic University in 2014, one NHU student remarked "The values of the school stood out for me."..."Now it comes down to dollar bills." According to the San Jose Mercury News, "some students who wanted a traditional, classroom approach to education said they felt abandoned by Laureate after NHU's drive to enroll thousands of new students in Internet classes did not produce the desired results."

=== Plans for NHU campus ===
As part of the Foundation for Hispanic Education's efforts, the East San Jose campus is planned to house The Center for Latino Education and Innovation, The Latino College Preparatory Academy (a bilingual charter school), and The Luis Valdez Leadership Academy, a charter high school for students in San José.
