= Napoleon Kaufman =

American football player (born 1973)

Napoleon Kaufman, III
No. 26
- Position: Running back

Personal information
- Born: June 7, 1973 (age 53); Kansas City, Missouri, U.S.
- Listed height: 5 ft 9 in (1.75 m)
- Listed weight: 185 lb (84 kg)

Career information
- High school: Lompoc (Lompoc, California)
- College: Washington
- NFL draft: 1995: 1st round, 18th overall pick

Career history
- Oakland Raiders (1995–2000)

Awards and highlights
- National champion (1991); Second-team All-American (1994); Third-team All-American (1993); Pac-10 Offensive Player of the Year (1994); 3× First-team All-Pac-10 (1992–1994)

Career NFL statistics
- Rushing yards: 4,792
- Average: 4.9
- Rushing touchdowns: 12
- Stats at Pro Football Reference

Napoleon "Nip" Kaufman (born June 7, 1973) is an American former professional football player who played his entire career as a running back and kick returner for the Oakland Raiders of the National Football League (NFL). He played college football for the Washington Huskies, earning All-American honors twice. After his playing career, he became an ordained minister and head football coach at Bishop O'Dowd High School and Dublin High School in the Bay Area.

== Early life ==
Kaufman was born in Kansas City, Missouri and grew up in Lompoc, California, 55 miles west-northwest of Santa Barbara. At Lompoc High School he was one of the greatest high school running backs in California prep history.

As a 135-pound sophomore in 1988, he rushed for 1,008 yards in leading Lompoc to the Southern Section divisional semifinals. As a junior in 1989, he had an even better season. Kaufman was named to the CIF All-State First Team, compiling 2,954 all-purpose yards and 39 touchdowns, averaging a remarkable 70 yards on kickoff returns. As a senior in 1990, at 5-foot-9, 170 pounds, with 4.3-second speed in the 40-yard dash, he was named the Cal Hi Sports California High School Football Player of the Year. Despite injuries, Kaufman rushed for 1,960 yards and 34 touchdowns, leading his team to a 13–1 record and a CIF championship at then-Mustang Stadium. He was also named to the USA Today and Parade Magazine first-team All-American lists on top of being named Northern League MVP and Santa Barbara County MVP. In his high school career, he rushed for 5,151 yards and 86 TDs. Kaufman chose the University of Washington over USC, Colorado, and Arizona.

Kaufman was also an exceptional track athlete. As a junior, Kaufman's personal best in the 100 meters was 10.39 seconds, and he was the CIF California State Champion in both the 100 (10.57) and 200 meters (21.15). He also was an accomplished long jumper with a personal best of over 24 feet.

== College career ==
In 1991, as a true freshman at Washington, Kaufman returned kicks for the Huskies during the year the team won the national championship. In September 1992, Sports Illustrated reported Kaufman to have recently been timed at 4.22 seconds in the 40-yard dash, with teammate Jason Shelley commenting, "Nobody runs with Napoleon." By the fall of 1994, coaches reported his 40-yard dash time to be 4.3 seconds, while being able to bench-press 420 pounds.

Among his notable collegiate performances was the 1994 "Whammy In Miami" game between the Huskies and the University of Miami at the Orange Bowl, where the Huskies ended Miami's 58-game home winning streak, which dated back to 1985. Kaufman was Washington's all-time leader in rushing yards for 23 years (4,106) and 200-yard games (4), third in rushing touchdowns (34), and tied with Chris Polk for most rushes for 50+ yards (6). In a game against UCLA in 1994 Kaufman set the school's record for longest non-scoring rush with 79 yards. Along with Polk and Myles Gaskin, he is one of only three Washington running backs to rush for 1,000 yards in three consecutive seasons (1992-94: 1,045, 1,299, and 1,390).

He was named to the All-Pac-10 team in 1992, 1993, and 1994. In 1994, he was a second-team All-American, finished ninth in Heisman Trophy voting (receiving three first-place ballots), and is a member of the University of Washington Hall of Fame.

As of 2025, Kaufman still held UW's career all-purpose yardage record, amassing 5,832 total yards.

== Professional career ==
Pre-draft measurables
Height	Weight	Arm length	Hand span	40-yard dash	10-yard split	20-yard split	Vertical jump	Bench press
5 ft 8 1/2 in (1.74 m)	182 lb (83 kg)	29 1/2 in (0.75 m)	8 1/2 in (0.22 m)	4.42 s	1.64 s	2.64 s	38.5 in (0.98 m)	24 reps

Kaufman was selected with the 18th pick in the first round of the 1995 NFL draft by the Oakland Raiders, where he remained for the entirety of his six-year NFL career, amassing 4,792 yards rushing on 4.90 yards per carry. Kaufman scored a touchdown in his first NFL game against the San Diego Chargers. Kaufman rushed for 490 yards as a rookie backing up Harvey Williams; also during his debut season, he scored on an 84-yard kickoff return for a touchdown in a win over the Indianapolis Colts.

As the Raiders' primary running back in 1997 and 1998, he rushed for 1,294 and 921 yards, respectively, and had 65 total receptions during those two seasons. Kaufman split playing time with Tyrone Wheatley in the latter part of his career. On October 19, 1997, in Week 8 of the 1997 season, Kaufman rushed for 227 yards, leading the Raiders to an upset of the undefeated Denver Broncos (the eventual Super Bowl champions that year) and setting the franchise mark for rushing yards in a single game. Kaufman broke the record of 221, set by Bo Jackson in his famous Monday Night Football performance against the Seattle Seahawks on November 30, 1987. Kaufman's record stood for 25 years, until broken by the Raiders' Josh Jacobs on November 27, 2022.

=== NFL career statistics ===
Year	Team	GP	Rush Att.	Yards	Avg.	LG	TD	Rec.	Yards	Avg.	LG	TD	KR	Yards	Avg.	LG	TD
1995	OAK	16	108	490	4.5	28	1	9	62	6.9	18	0	22	572	26.0	84t	1
1996	OAK	16	150	874	5.8	77	1	22	143	6.5	19	1	25	548	21.9	39	0
1997	OAK	16	272	1,294	4.8	83t	6	40	403	10.1	70t	2	0	0	-	-	0
1998	OAK	13	217	921	4.2	80t	2	25	191	7.6	39	0	0	0	-	-	0
1999	OAK	16	138	714	5.2	75t	2	18	181	10.1	50	1	42	831	19.8	48	0
2000	OAK	14	93	499	5.4	60	0	13	127	9.8	25	1	9	198	22.0	31	0
Career		91	978	4,792	4.9	83t	12	127	1,107	8.7	70t	5	98	2,149	21.9	84t	1

== Personal life and coaching ==
During the latter part of his playing career, Kaufman was the Raiders' chaplain, and baptized several teammates in the whirlpool at the team's practice facility. He retired abruptly at the end of the 2000 NFL season to pursue a career as a Christian minister. Today he is the senior pastor at The Well Christian Community Church in Livermore, California, a church he founded with about 15 families in 2003; as of 2025 the church has over 1,000 regular worshipers.He has three sons and one daughter and has been married to Nicole since September 1996.

He also coached in the Pleasanton Junior Football League where his teams went undefeated four years in a row. Kaufman was the head football coach at Bishop O'Dowd High School in Oakland, where all three of his sons played. Kaufman's Bishop O'Dowd team won the CIF State Division 5-AA Championship in December 2016. He also returned as the Raiders team chaplain in 2012 and served in that role until the team relocated to Las Vegas in 2020.

As of the 2024-2025 high school football season, Kaufman took over as head coach at Dublin High School in Dublin, California. He led Dublin High to the playoffs in the 2025-2026 season.

== See also ==
- Washington Huskies football statistical leaders
- CIF California State Meet alumni
