= East Side Cadet Academy =

Location
- 2315 Canoas Garden; San Jose, California 95133; United States
- Coordinates: 37°17′30″N 121°52′29″W

Information
- School district: East Side Union High School District (ESUHSD)
- Grades: 9–12

The East Side Cadet Academy is a military high school in the Evergreen area of San Jose, California, United States.

== See also ==
- Santa Clara County high schools
