= Rex Walters =

American basketball player & coach (born 1970)

Personal information
- Born: March 12, 1970 (age 56) Omaha, Nebraska, U.S.
- Listed height: 6 ft 3 in (1.91 m)
- Listed weight: 230 lb (104 kg)

Career information
- High school: Independence (San Jose, California)
- College: Northwestern (1988–1990); Kansas (1991–1993)
- NBA draft: 1993: 1st round, 16th overall
- Drafted by: New Jersey Nets
- Playing career: 1993–2003
- Position: Shooting guard
- Number: 2, 3, 23
- Coaching career: 2003–present

Career history

Playing
- 1993–1995: New Jersey Nets
- 1995–1998: Philadelphia 76ers
- 1998–2000: Miami Heat
- 2000: Baloncesto León
- 2000–2001: Kansas City Knights
- 2001–2002: CB Gran Canaria

Coaching
- 2002–2003: Blue Valley NW HS (assistant)
- 2003–2005: Valparaiso (assistant)
- 2005–2006: Florida Atlantic (assistant)
- 2006–2008: Florida Atlantic
- 2008–2016: San Francisco
- 2016–2017: Grand Rapids Drive
- 2017–2018: Detroit Pistons (assistant)
- 2018–2019: Nevada (special assistant)
- 2019–2020: Wake Forest (assistant)
- 2020–2021: New Orleans Pelicans (assistant)
- 2022–2024: Charlotte Hornets (assistant)

Career highlights
- As player: 2× First-team All-Big Eight (1992, 1993); As coach: WCC Coach of the Year (2014)

Career NBA statistics
- Points: 1,547 (4.6 ppg)
- Rebounds: 403 (1.2 rpg)
- Assists: 569 (1.7 apg)
- Stats at NBA.com
- Stats at Basketball Reference

Rex Andrew Walters Sr. (born March 12, 1970) is an American professional basketball coach and former player who last served as an assistant coach for the Charlotte Hornets of the National Basketball Association (NBA).He currently is the Head Coach at Regis University. Previously, he was the associate head coach at Wake Forest University under Danny Manning. Prior to Wake Forest, he spent time at Nevada under Eric Musselman. He has made head coaching stops with the Grand Rapids Drive (NBA G-League), the University of San Francisco and Florida Atlantic University.

Walters pedigree for coaching began as a player, receiving tutelage from some of the game legendary coaches. Roy Williams at the University of Kansas and the NBA's Chuck Daly, Larry Brown and Pat Riley all mentored Walters during his years as a player. Walters played college basketball at Northwestern and Kansas. In 1993, he received a Bachelor of Science in Education degree from the University of Kansas. After Kansas, he played professionally for ten years, including seven seasons in the NBA from 1993 to 2000. Walters has been active on Apple Podcasts hosting his own show Real Talk Basketball with Rex Walters.

== Biography ==
Born in Omaha, Nebraska on March 12, 1970, Walters played high school basketball at Piedmont Hills High School in San Jose, California, but graduated from Independence High School in San Jose, California. Walters is biracial; his mother is Japanese and his father is white. In an interview with Rick Quan, Rex Walters responded to the question of feeling that he was a pioneer for Asian Americans. He responded: "I consider myself Japanese-American. I just don't look it. People are always surprised. Now we got a guy like Jeremy Lin breaking barriers, I'd like to think I played a small part in that". He later added, "People ask me who I am? What I am? I am a Japanese-American, I take great pride in that." Walters is known as a hard working, selfless person with a great passion to motivate and lead others. Walters daughter, Addison Walters is currently with the Minnesota Timberwolves staff serving as a Video Associate.

=== College playing career ===
==== Northwestern ====
(1988–1990) Walters played at Northwestern University (1988–1990) and was All Big 10 honorable mention leading the team in scoring.

==== Kansas ====
(1990–1993) In 1990, he transferred to Kansas, playing two seasons. In 68 starts under Roy Williams, he averaged 15.6 points per game, leading the Jayhawks in scoring during both his junior and senior campaigns. KU combined to go 56–12 overall in 1991–92 and 1992–93, winning back-to-back Big Eight titles and reaching the 1993 Final Four. Walters was named to the All-Big Eight team both seasons and was Big Eight Male Athlete of the Year as a senior in 1993. As a junior, Walters averaged 16.0 points per game as the Jayhawks went 27–5. In his senior season, KU had a record of 29–7, with Walters scoring at a clip of 15.3 points per game.

Walters was an outstanding scorer from all areas of the court at Kansas, shooting nearly 51% from the field, 42% from three-point range and 85% at the free throw line. The 6'4" shooting guard was selected by the New Jersey Nets with the 16th pick in the 1993 NBA draft.

=== Playing career (Professional) ===
Walters’ professional playing career spanned 10 seasons, including seven seasons in the NBA with the New Jersey Nets (1993–95), Philadelphia 76ers (1995–98) and Miami Heat (1998–2000). He also had stints with Baloncesto Leon (2000), the Kansas City Knights (2000–01; 2002–03) and CB Gran Canaria (2001–02).

The New Jersey Nets selected Walters with the 16th overall pick in the 1993 NBA draft. As a rookie, Walters led the team in field goal percentage (.522) and hit 14 of 28 three-point attempts. His role expanded in 1994–95 and his statistics improved in nearly every category.

In 1995–96, Walters was dealt to the Philadelphia 76ers and started the last eight games of the season. He played in 59 games for Philadelphia in 1996–97, making 16 starts behind Allen Iverson and Jerry Stackhouse. He led the team in three-point shooting with a .385 mark while averaging 6.8 points a game. He played in 38 games in 1997–98, splitting the season between Philadelphia and Miami, which signed him after he was waived by the Sixers in January of ’98. He appeared in 33 games (13 starts) for the Heat in 1998–99 and averaged 3.1 points a game. After leaving the NBA, Walters played for León and Gran Canaria in Spain. In addition to his playing career, Walters had a minor role in the 1994 film Blue Chips starring Nick Nolte and Shaquille O'Neal.

=== Coaching career ===
(2002–2003) Blue Valley NW High School, Assistant Coach, qualifying for the Kansas Class 6A State Tournament.

(2003–2005) Valparaiso University, Assistant Coach accomplishing much with head coach Homer Drew. The Crusaders were the Mid Continent Conference Regular Season and Tournament Champions (2004) advancing to the 2004 NCAA tournament. Walters was ranked the 20th best assistant basketball coach in the country at the mid-major level by The Hoop Scoop online in 2005.

(2006–2008) Florida Atlantic University, Head Coach.

(2008–2016) The University of San Francisco, Head Coach. April 15, 2008 Walters was hired to replace Eddie Sutton who was hired to replace Jesse Evans.

(2016–2017) On June 29, 2016, Walters was named the head coach of the Grand Rapids Drive. Two players were called up to the Detroit Pistons during his time, Jordan Crawford and Ray McCallum.

(2017–2018) On July 1, 2017, Walters was named an assistant coach for the Detroit Pistons. Working for Stan Van Gundy the Detroit Pistons had a defensive rating of 10th in the NBA.

(2018–2019) Walters was hired by Eric Musselman as Special Assistant to the head coach at Nevada. The Wolf Pack were pre-season #5 in the nation, Mountain West Conference Champions and a 7 seed in the 2018 NCAA tournament.

(2019–2020) Walters joined the Wake Forest basketball program in May 2019 as an Associate Head Coach under Danny Manning.

(2020–2021) On November 16, 2020, Walters was hired as assistant coach by the New Orleans Pelicans.

(2022–2024) On August 2, 2022, Walters was hired as an assistant coach by the Charlotte Hornets.

(2025-Present) On August 13, 2025, Walters was hired as head coach at Regis University in Colorado.

== Career statistics ==
Legend
| GP | Games played | GS | Games started | MPG | Minutes per game |
| FG% | Field goal percentage | 3P% | 3-point field goal percentage | FT% | Free throw percentage |
| RPG | Rebounds per game | APG | Assists per game | SPG | Steals per game |
| BPG | Blocks per game | PPG | Points per game | **Bold** | Career high |

=== NBA ===
==== Regular season ====
| Year | Team | GP | GS | MPG | FG% | 3P% | FT% | RPG | APG | SPG | BPG | PPG |
|---|---|---|---|---|---|---|---|---|---|---|---|---|
| 1993–94 | New Jersey | 48 | 0 | 8.0 | .522 | **.500** | .824 | .8 | 1.5 | .3 | .1 | 3.4 |
| 1994–95 | New Jersey | **80** | **30** | **17.9** | .439 | .362 | .769 | 1.2 | 1.5 | **.5** | **.2** | 6.5 |
| 1995–96 | New Jersey | 11 | 0 | 7.9 | .364 | .250 | **1.000** | .6 | 1.0 | .3 | .0 | 3.0 |
| 1995–96 | Philadelphia | 33 | 8 | 15.8 | .426 | .352 | .783 | 1.8 | 1.9 | **.5** | .1 | 4.6 |
| 1996–97 | Philadelphia | 59 | 16 | 17.6 | .455 | .385 | .790 | **1.8** | 1.9 | **.5** | .1 | **6.8** |
| 1997–98 | Philadelphia | 19 | 0 | 6.7 | .379 | .214 | **1.000** | .5 | 1.1 | .3 | .0 | 2.2 |
| 1997–98 | Miami | 19 | 0 | 5.7 | **.542** | .375 | .818 | .8 | .7 | .2 | .1 | 2.0 |
| 1998–99 | Miami | 33 | 13 | 15.3 | .368 | .316 | .826 | 1.5 | 1.8 | .3 | .1 | 3.1 |
| 1999–2000 | Miami | 33 | 0 | 11.8 | .418 | .250 | .750 | 1.1 | **2.0** | .2 | .0 | 2.8 |
| Career | | 335 | 67 | 13.7 | .441 | .361 | .809 | 1.2 | 1.7 | .4 | .1 | 4.6 |

==== Playoffs ====
| Year | Team | GP | GS | MPG | FG% | 3P% | FT% | RPG | APG | SPG | BPG | PPG |
|---|---|---|---|---|---|---|---|---|---|---|---|---|
| 1994 | New Jersey | 1 | 0 | 1.0 | **1.000** | — | — | .0 | .0 | .0 | .0 | **2.0** |
| 1999 | Miami | **3** | 0 | **4.3** | .000 | .000 | — | .0 | **1.3** | .0 | .0 | .0 |
| Career | | 4 | 0 | 3.5 | .250 | .000 | — | .0 | 1.0 | .0 | .0 | .5 |

== Head coaching record ==
Record table
| Season | Team | Overall | Conference | Standing | Postseason |
|---|---|---|---|---|---|
Florida Atlantic Owls (Sun Belt Conference) (2006–2008)
| 2006–07 | Florida Atlantic | 16–15 | 10–8 | 3rd (East) | |
| 2007–08 | Florida Atlantic | 15–18 | 8–10 | 4th (East) | |
| Florida Atlantic: | | 31–33 (.484) | 18–18 (.500) | | |
San Francisco Dons (West Coast Conference) (2008–2016)
| 2008–09 | San Francisco | 11–19 | 3–11 | 7th | |
| 2009–10 | San Francisco | 12–18 | 7–7 | T–4th | |
| 2010–11 | San Francisco | 19–15 | 10–4 | 3rd | CIT Quarterfinals |
| 2011–12 | San Francisco | 20–14 | 8–8 | 5th | CBI first round |
| 2012–13 | San Francisco | 14–15 | 7–9 | 5th | |
| 2013–14 | San Francisco | 21–12 | 13–5 | 2nd | NIT first round |
| 2014–15 | San Francisco | 14–18 | 7–11 | 6th | |
| 2015–16 | San Francisco | 15–15 | 8–10 | 5th | |
| San Francisco: | | 126–125 (.502) | 63–65 (.492) | | |
| Total: | | 157–158 (.498) | | | |
National champion Postseason invitational champion Conference regular season champion Conference regular season and conference tournament champion Division regular season champion Division regular season and conference tournament champion Conference tournament champion
