= Carl Monroe =

American football player (1960–1989)

No. 32, 83
- Positions: Running back, Wide receiver

Personal information
- Born: February 20, 1960; Pittsburgh, Pennsylvania, U.S.
- Died: April 26, 1989 (aged 29); San Jose, California, U.S.

Career information
- High school: Overfelt
- College: Utah
- NFL draft: 1983: undrafted

Career history
- San Francisco 49ers (1983–1987)

Awards and highlights
- Super Bowl champion (XIX); Second-team All-WAC (1981)

Career NFL statistics
- Rushing yards: 62
- Rush attempts: 15
- Receiving yards: 323
- Receiving touchdowns: 2
- Kicking yards: 1,660
- Games played: 43
- Stats at Pro Football Reference

Carl Monroe (February 20, 1960 – April 26, 1989) was an American professional football player who was a running back and wide receiver for the San Francisco 49ers from 1983 to 1987.

Monroe's career highlight came during Super Bowl XIX versus the Miami Dolphins when he caught a 33-yard touchdown pass from Joe Montana. He died in 1989 of a suspected accidental valium overdose, while attempting to resurrect his football career in the CFL, and while fighting alcoholism.

The annual Carl Monroe Golf Tournament is held to benefit students of William C. Overfelt High School in San Jose, CA, his alma mater.

== College career ==
Carl Monroe played football for the University of Utah, who recruited him out of Overfelt High School, located in San Jose, CA. In 1981, he rushed for 522 yards with five touchdowns on 99 attempts. He finished second on the team behind Del Rodgers. With Rodgers off to the NFL after that season, Monroe took over as the starting running back. Monroe rushed 1,507 yards and 4 touchdowns on 309 attempts. However, Utah, under new head coach Chuck Stobart finished with a losing record at 5-6. Monroe did more than run the ball, also serving as the teams kick returner. His stats in 1982 not only lead the team, but his carries and yardage also lead the Western Athletic Conference as well.

== Pro career ==
Despite his accomplishments at Utah, Monroe went undrafted in the 1981 NFL draft. He signed with the San Francisco 49ers and made the team, and was a backup behind Roger Craig and Wendell Tyler, the latter of whom was acquired from the Los Angeles Rams. In his rookie season, Monroe appeared in only five games and gained a mere 23 yards. In 1984, the 49ers finished 15–1 on their way to the Super Bowl, where they routed the Miami Dolphins 38–16. Miami scored first, going up 3–0 thanks to an Uwe Von Schamann field goal. On the next possession, the 49ers drove down the field, ending when Monroe caught a 33 yard scoring pass from Joe Montana. The ensuing extra point put the 49ers up 7–3. It was the only pass Monroe caught the entire game.

In 1985, Monroe did not have any rushing yards, though he did catch passes out of the backfield and was used mainly as a kick returner. However, he did return a kick off for 95 yards for a touchdown in a 35–8 win over the Washington Redskins. The kick return were the first points of the game. Monroe played in only six games in 1986. In 1987, Monroe, who been one of the final cuts that summer, crossed the picket line during the 1987 NFLPA strike. He caught a 39 yard touchdown pass from replacement quarterback Mark Stevens in the 49ers 41–21 blow out of the New York Giants, which consisted of only replacement players. However, at the end of the players strike, the 49ers released Monroe, ending his time in the NFL.

== Death ==
In April 1989, 29 year old Carl Monroe was rushed to the Santa Clara Valley Medical Center in San Jose. it was suspected that Monroe was having a heart attack. At around 7:30 A.M on April 26, 1989, Carl's girlfriend awoke to the sound of Monroe coughing in bed, and called the paramedics. By 7:58 A.M., Monroe was dead. Monroe, who had battled alcoholism, had accidentally taken an overdose of Valium. Monroe had just signed a deal with the British Columbia Lions of the Canadian Football League in hopes of resurrecting his pro career. Former teammate Roger Craig heard the news and was devastated by the sudden passing of his friend, and rushed to the hospital. There he met Carl's brother, Tyrone, who confirmed that Carl had indeed died. Monroe, who'd had a pizza the night before, had complained of feeling ill and vomited several times the night before he died. According to Monroe's agent at the time of his passing, Monroe was looking to put his battles with alcohol behind him and focus on playing pro football again.

== See also ==
- List of NCAA major college yearly punt and kickoff return leaders
