= Randy Gatewood =

American football player (born 1973)

No. 17
- Position: Wide receiver

Personal information
- Born: January 31, 1973 (age 53); Wichita Falls, Texas, U.S.

Career information
- College: UNLV
- NFL draft: 1995: undrafted

Career history
- Miami Dolphins (1995)*; Arizona Rattlers (1996–2007)
- * Offseason or practice squad member only

Awards and highlights
- ArenaBowl champion (1997); 3× First-team All-Arena (1997, 2003, 2006); 3× Second-team All-Arena (1996, 1999, 2000); 3× AFL All-Ironman Team (2002, 2003, 2006); 2× AFL Ironman of the Year (2003, 2006); AFL's 20 Greatest Players #17 (2006); AFL Hall of Fame inductee (2012); NCAA single-game record 23 receptions

Career AFL statistics
- Receptions: 690
- Receiving yards: 9,029
- Touchdowns: 214
- Stats at ArenaFan.com

Randy Gatewood (born January 31, 1973) is an American former professional football player who was a wide receiver in the National Football League (NFL) and Arena Football League (AFL). He was signed by the Miami Dolphins as an undrafted free agent in 1995. He played college football for the UNLV Rebels. He shares the single game record for most receptions with 23 catches, which he accomplished on September 17, 1994 against the Idaho Vandals.

Gatewood also played for the Arizona Rattlers. On March 25, 2002, Gatewood re-signed with the Rattlers.

In 2015, Gatewood became a sideline analyst for CBS Sports Network's AFL coverage.

== See also ==
- NCAA Division I FBS receiving leaders
