= Jethro Franklin =

American football player and coach (born 1965)

Personal information
- Born: October 25, 1965 (age 61); Saint-Nazaire, France
- Listed height: 6 ft 1 in (1.85 m)
- Listed weight: 258 lb (117 kg)

Career information
- High school: Yerba Buena (San Jose, California)
- College: Fresno State
- NFL draft: 1988: 11th round, 298th overall pick

Career history

Playing
- Houston Oilers (1988)*; Seattle Seahawks (1989)
- * Offseason or practice squad member only

Coaching
- Fresno State (1991–1998) Defensive line coach; UCLA (1999) Interim defensive line coach; Green Bay Packers (2000–2004) Defensive line coach; USC (2005) Defensive line coach; Tampa Bay Buccaneers (2006) Defensive line coach; Houston Texans (2007–2008) Defensive line coach; USC (2009) Defensive line coach; Temple (2010) Defensive line coach; Miami (2011–2014) Defensive line coach; Oakland Raiders (2015–2017) Defensive line coach; Seattle Seahawks (2018–2019) Assistant defensive line coach; Missouri (2021) Defensive line coach; Fresno State (2022–2024) Defensive line coach/defensive run game coordinator; UCLA (2025) Defensive Line Coach

Awards and highlights
- Third-team All-American (1987)

Career NFL statistics
- Games played: 7
- Games started: 1
- Stats at Pro Football Reference

Jethro Fitzgerald Franklin (born October 25, 1965) is an American football coach and former player who most recently was the defensive line coach for the UCLA Bruins.

== Playing career ==
Franklin was born in St. Nazaire, France, while his father was stationed in the US military. He grew up in San Jose, California, attended Yerba Buena High School. He attended San Jose City College, a junior college, where he played both years and earned junior college All-American honors in 1985. He transferred to Fresno State University, where he played for two seasons. While playing for the Bulldogs he earned All-American second-team honors both seasons, set a then-school record with 19.5 sacks his junior season, and was the Pacific Coast Conference Defensive Player of the Year and Fresno State's MVP as a 1987 senior. He graduated from Fresno State with a bachelor's degree in criminology in 1988.

In the 1988 NFL draft, Franklin was drafted in the 11th round (298th overall) by the Houston Oilers. He did not play for the Oilers, but played defensive line for the Seattle Seahawks in the 1989 season. He then was the No. 1 draft choice of the San Antonio Riders of the World League of American Football in 1991, but instead opted to begin his coaching career.

== Coaching career ==
=== Fresno State ===
Franklin returned to Fresno State to coach the defensive line from 1991 to 1998, this term included a pair of NFL coaching fellowships, working with the Buffalo Bills in the summer of 1994 and the Cleveland Browns in the summer of 1995.

=== UCLA ===
In 1999, he coached the interior defensive line for UCLA.

=== Green Bay Packers ===
He then served as Defensive Line Coach for the Green Bay Packers from 2000 to 2004.

=== USC ===
He coached the defensive line for USC during the 2005 season. He coached for the Tampa Bay Buccaneers in 2006.

=== Houston Texans ===
He was a member of the Houston Texans from 2007 to 2008.

=== USC ===
Franklin returned to USC as the defensive line coach in 2009.

=== Temple University ===
He moved to coach the Defensive line at Temple Owls.

=== University of Miami ===
In 2011, he moved with Al Golden to the Miami Hurricanes.

=== Oakland Raiders ===
On February 6, 2015, he joined the Oakland Raiders.

=== Seattle Seahawks ===
On January 31, 2018, Franklin joined the Seattle Seahawks as assistant defensive line coach.
