= KIPP San Jose Collegiate =

Location
- 1790 Educational Park Drive, P-7; San Jose, California 95133; United States; 37.368646°N 121.860211°W

Information
- Type: Public charter high school
- Opened: 2008
- Principal: Tom Ryan (2012-2022) Kim Vo (2022-present)
- Faculty: 32.05 (FTE)
- Grades: 9 – 12
- Enrollment: 512 (2024–25)
- Campus type: suburban
- Color: purple
- Team name: Wolfpack
- Website: kippnorcal.org/school/kipp-san-jose-collegiate/

KIPP San Jose Collegiate is a high school in San Jose, California, part of the KIPP chain. It is in the East Side Union High School District and was founded in 2008.

KIPP San Jose Collegiate opened in August 2008. It was founded by Melissa Gonzales, who had been one of the original teachers at KIPP Heartwood Academy, a middle school also in East San Jose. As of the 2016–2017 school year, there were 499 students, of whom 75% were Latino, 22% were Asian/Pacific Islander, and 1% were African American. In the 2015–16 school year, 81% were socio-economically disadvantaged and 7.9% were English learners.

The school has achieved high passing percentages on state proficiency tests, including in 2015, when many other charter schools' performance on the tests declined. In 2015 it appeared in the top 2% in a Washington Post ranking of high schools by willingness to challenge students by administering upper-level tests. In 2017 it was ranked 23rd in the US by U.S. News & World Report. It was named a California Distinguished School in 2013 and 2021.

KIPP San Jose Collegiate's sports teams are the Wolfpack.
