= Keri Sanchez =

American soccer player and coach (born 1972)

Personal information
- Full name: Keri Lynn Sanchez
- Date of birth: December 25, 1972 (age 53)
- Place of birth: Englewood, Colorado, U.S.
- Height: 5 ft 4 in (1.63 m)
- Position: Defender

Team information
- Current team: Colorado College Tigers (head coach)

College career
Years	Team	Apps	(Gls)
1991–1994	North Carolina Tar Heels		

Senior career*
Years	Team	Apps	(Gls)
1995–2000	Silicon Valley Red Devils		
1999	Suzuyo Shimizu F.C. Lovely Ladies		
2001–2002	Boston Breakers		
2003	San Jose CyberRays		
2004–2008	California Storm		
2009	Los Angeles Sol	5	(0)

International career
1990–1992	United States U-20		
1991–2001	United States	13	(0)

Managerial career
- 1996–2003: Oregon Ducks (asst.)
- 2004–2017: Claremont-Mudd-Scripps Athenas
- 2017–2021: Texas Longhorns (asst.)
- 2021: Illinois Wesleyan Titans
- 2022–: Colorado College Tigers
- * Club domestic league appearances and goals

Keri Lynn Sanchez (formerly Raygor; born December 25, 1972) is an American women's soccer coach who serves as head coach of the Colorado College Tigers women's soccer team. She is also a former player who last played as a defender for Los Angeles Sol of Women's Professional Soccer and the United States women's national soccer team.

== Early life and education ==
Sanchez was a dual sport athlete at Santa Teresa High School in San Jose, California, where she also excelled in track and field. At the CIF California State Meet, between 1988 and 1990, she achieved three second-place and three third-place finishes spread between hurdles, long jump, and triple jump.

== Playing career ==
Sanchez played for the Silicon Valley Red Devils of the USL W-League and Women's Premier Soccer League from 1995 to 2000.

=== College career ===
Sanchez played for the North Carolina Tar Heels women's soccer team from 1991 to 1994, winning four consecutive NCAA Division I women's soccer tournament championships and scoring the championship-winning goals in 1992 and 1994.

=== International career ===
Sanchez made 13 appearances for the United States women's national soccer team, including the 1991 CONCACAF Women's Championship.

== Coaching career ==
While still playing soccer, Sanchez also began coaching the sport as an assistant for the Oregon Ducks women's soccer team in 1996. In 2004, the NCAA Division III Claremont-Mudd-Scripps Athenas hired Sanchez as its head coach, where she served for 13 years and amassed a 148–92–30 record and five NCAA tournament appearances, reaching the Sweet 16 in the 2008 tournament.

She served as an assistant coach to Angela Kelly at the Texas Longhorns women's soccer team from 2017 to 2020.

In May 2021, the Division III Illinois Wesleyan Titans women's soccer team hired Sanchez as its head coach. In her only season with the team, the Titans finished with a 9–8–1 record.

The Colorado College Tigers NCAA Division I women's soccer program hired Sanchez as its head coach in December 2021.
