= Sneha Revanur =

AI regulation activist

- Born: 2004 (age 21–22); San Jose, California
- Education: Williams College, Stanford University
- Years active: 2020–present
- Organization: Encode

Sneha Revanur (born 2004) is an American activist. She is the founder and president of Encode, a youth organization advocating for the regulation of artificial intelligence.

== Early life and education ==
Revanur was born and raised in San Jose, California, where she attended Evergreen Valley High School and was a delegate to the United States Senate Youth Program.

Revanur attended Williams College before transferring to Stanford University.

== Activism ==
In 2023, Revanur led a coalition of youth-led organizations to send a joint letter to congressional leaders and the White House Office of Science and Technology Policy calling for the inclusion of young people on AI oversight and advisory boards.

=== Encode ===
Revanur founded Encode after coming across California Proposition 25, a ballot measure that would have replaced the use of cash bail statewide with pretrial risk assessment algorithms. After Proposition 25 failed to pass, Revanur broadened Encode's focus to include other societal challenges related to AI use, including surveillance, disinformation, and job loss.

== Awards and honors ==
In 2023, Revanur was the youngest individual named to TIME's inaugural list of the 100 most influential people in artificial intelligence.

In December 2024, she was included on the BBC's 100 Women list.
