= Yerba Buena High School =

YBHS

Location
- 1855 Lucretia Avenue; San Jose, Santa Clara County, California 95122; United States; 37°19′14″N 121°50′59″W

Information
- School type: Public High School
- Motto: "Diversity is Our Strength; Strength comes from within" and "Warrior Pride"
- Established: 1971
- School district: East Side Union High School District
- Superintendent: Glenn Vander Zee
- School code: 053113
- Principal: Lyra Hua
- Teaching staff: 71.54 (FTE)
- Grades: 9–12
- Age range: 13-18
- Enrollment: 1,621 (2023–2024)
- Average class size: 30
- Student to teacher ratio: 22.66
- Campus size: 40 acres
- Colors: Black, Green and Grey
- Athletics conference: BVAL
- Mascot: Warriors
- Nickname: YB, YBHS, YB High School
- Rival: Andrew P. Hill High School
- Accreditation: 6 year term in 2015
- Website: Official website

Yerba Buena High School is a public, comprehensive four-year high school located in the East San Jose area of San Jose, California, USA. Its athletic teams are well-known, and the school has the Engineering MAGNET program and the Green Construction/Architecture MAGNET program. The principal of Yerba Buena High School is Lyra Hua.

== Demographics ==
As of the 2025-2026 school year, Yerba Buena High School had a 90% graduation rate amongst its senior class. The schools total enrollment is approximately 1,555 to 1,621 students from 9th-12th grade. Of these students, 54% of students who graduated met the requirements to admission to the University of California and/or California State University campuses.

== Diversity ==
Yerba Buena has a very diverse student population. NCES in 2024-2025 reported that was 800 Hispanic/Latino students,738 Asian students,32 White students,21 Black students, 14 students identifying as two or more races, 5 Native Hawaiian/Pacific Islander students and 2 American Indian/Alaska Native students.

== Curriculum ==
Advanced Placement many (AP) courses are offered at Yerba Buena. As of 2024, 47% of students participated in at least one AP course and/or exam.

Academic programs include Avid (designed around college readiness), Puente (college preparatory program), Law Pathway(provides insight and education to those interested in the law field), and SVCTE (Silicon Valley Career Technical Education). Furthermore, The school has the Engineering MAGNET program affiliated with Project Lead the Way for students to begin in grade 9 until graduation. The program focuses on a strong academic core curriculum that integrates the theoretical principles of math and science with practical application of technology. The program also provides college preparatory work in the humanities, foreign languages, and social sciences as well as summer enrichment classes.

There is also the Green Construction/Architecture MAGNET program for students at Yerba Buena. In the program students learn important aspects of building development and design, and use mathematics, sciences, and standard engineering practices to design residential and commercial projects. Participating students document their work through a 3D architecture design software.

Athletics: Yerba Buena High School has many notable sports teams. This includes... Spring Badminton, Baseball, Boys Tennis, Girls Tennis, Golf, Softball, Swimming & Diving, Track & Field Fall Cross Country, Football, Girls Volleyball Winter Boys Basketball, Girls Basketball, Boys Soccer, Girls Soccer, Wrestling

== Notable alumni ==
- Ken Taylor, football player
- Jethro Franklin, defensive line coach for the Oakland Raiders
- Lloyd Pierce, Head coach for the Atlanta Hawks

== School Campus ==
The school campus includes landscaped areas, walkways, student parking, and athletic facilities. The campus also includes the Union, which underwent renovations, and a theater and auditorium that houses classrooms for the arts. A gymnasium is located near the student parking area.

== See also ==
- Santa Clara County high schools
