= Piedmont Hills High School =

Location
- 1377 Piedmont Rd; San Jose, California 95132; 37.402487°N 121.850159°W

Information
- Type: Public
- Established: 1965
- School district: East Side Union High School District
- Principal: Nancy Pereira
- Staff: 83.87 (FTE)
- Enrollment: 1,918 (2024-2025)
- Student to teacher ratio: 22.87
- Color
- Website: Official Website

Piedmont Hills High School is a comprehensive public four-year high school located in the Berryessa neighborhood of San Jose, California, US. It is part of the East Side Union High School District and in 2019 was ranked in the highest categories on the California School Dashboard, earning the top rating of "blue" for Mathematics, English Language Arts, and Graduation Rate. In 2003, it was awarded a California Distinguished School recognition and has received various awards in several aspects of its curriculum since.

The school began operation in 1965, under founding principal Gerald R. Bocciardi.

== History ==
- In 2012, the girls' track & field team was the #1 CCS champion. Also became state champions and earned the second fastest time in the country
- In 2018, the school repaired its swimming pool.
- In 2019, the school finished its new, modern science building.

== Notable alumni ==
- Stephen Anderson, American football player for the Houston Texans
- Ato Boldon, Olympic track medalist & World Champion
- John Coughran, professional basketball player
- Lucius Davis (born 1970), basketball player
- Stephanie Foo, journalist and writer
- Faraz Jaka, professional poker player
- Steve Papin, American football player
- Rex Walters, professional basketball player and coach
- Jerry Yang, co-founder of Yahoo!

== Activities ==
- Piedmont Hills Math Team, (notable members: Nicole Shen who made MOP)

== See also ==
- Santa Clara County high schools
