= Andrew Hill High School =

Andrew P. Hill High School
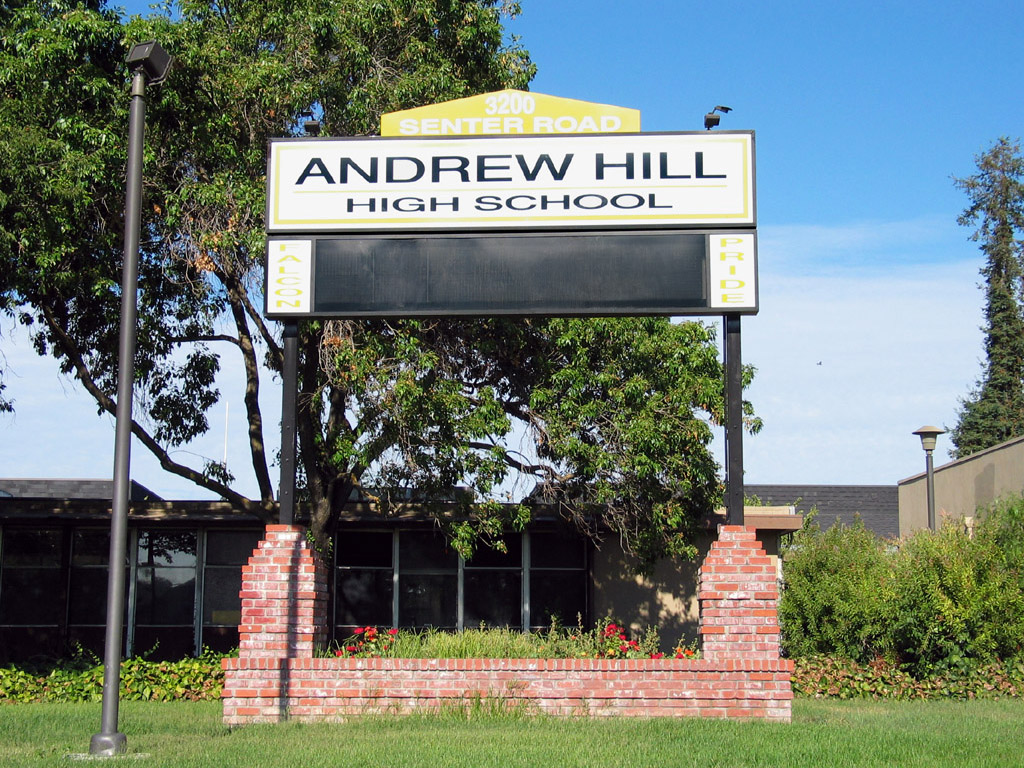

Location
- 3200 Senter Road; San Jose, Santa Clara County, California 95111-1399; United States; 37°17′32″N 121°49′49″W

Information
- Type: Public
- Established: 1956
- School district: East Side Union High School District
- Superintendent: Chris D. Funk
- Principal: Jose Hernandez
- Teaching staff: 79.19 (FTE)
- Grades: 9–12
- Age range: 13–18
- Enrollment: 1,497 (2025-2026)
- Average class size: 28
- Student to teacher ratio: 20.46
- Language: English
- Hours in school day: 8
- Campus type: Closed
- Colors: Black, Gold, white
- Athletics conference: California Interscholastic Federation
- Sports: Football, soccer, badminton, tennis, golf, track and field, cross country, baseball, softball, swimming, basketball, wrestling, volleyball, cheerleading
- Mascot: Falcon
- Nickname: AH, AHHS, Hill, A Hill
- Team name: Falcons
- Rival: Yerba Buena High School
- Newspaper: Falcon Voice
- IB school code: 001430
- Website: http://andrewphill.esuhsd.org/

Andrew Putnam Hill High School is a public secondary school, magnet school, and International Baccalaureate World School, located in the Edenvale neighbourhood of San Jose, California, United States. The school opened in 1956, and educates approximately 1,564 students as of 2026. It is one of eighteen schools of the East Side Union High School District (ESUHSD). It is named after Californian painter and preservationist Andrew P. Hill.

== Demographics ==
As of 2012, Andrew Hill High's demographics is relatively close to that of neighbouring Yerba Buena High School's, and is roughly 66% Mexican American, 25% Asian American, 2.3% White, 1.4% African American and 1% other (Native American and Pacific Islander).

As of the 2023–2024 school year, Andrew Hill High School had an 83.8% graduation rate amongst its senior class. This number is up from the 2022-2023 graduation rate of 82.1%.

In 2007, 45% of the school's students qualified for the free lunch program, compared to the district average of 25%. In 2010, 55% of the school's students qualified for the federally subsidized lunches, the best measure of the percentage of low-income students at each school. Andrew Hill receives Title I low income funding under the No Child Left Behind Act.

== History ==
There was a movement to make the school a charter school. However, this push was rejected by district trustees, though the effort continued. If the effort succeeded, Andrew Hill would have become the largest charter school in Northern California.

== Curriculum ==
Advanced Placement (AP) courses are offered at Andrew Hill. As of 2011, 33% of students participated in at least one AP course and/or exam. The average number of tests per students taking the AP exams was 2.4.

The school has the Medical MAGNET program for students to begin in grade 10 until graduation, designed to further educate participating high school students with a focus on medicine, and involves science classes and education in medical literature.

The Biotech Academy is also available, and is coordinated by Paul Moradkhan. It is a California Partnership Academy (CPA), similar to the MAGNET programs, designed for participating high school students as a career focused education in the field of biotechnology. Students are enrolled in the academy from grade 10 through 12.

=== IB ===
The International Baccalaureate (IB) Programme has been offered at Andrew Hill since February 2003. Students may take the entire Diploma Programme, or single IB courses stand alone for certificates, only during grades 11 and 12. The current IB Programme coordinator at the school is Michael Winsatt.

In the 2012–2013 school year, Andrew Hill students took IB courses at both the higher and standard levels in English, mathematics, music, Spanish, theatre and visual arts, only at the higher level in history, and only at the standard level in chemistry, biology, French, physics, sports science and Vietnamese. Students in the full IB Diploma Programme are required to take history (Group 3) and English (Group 1) at the higher level both Diploma years at Andrew Hill, as well as Theory of Knowledge. Students may decide to take their third higher level in the remaining subjects: the sciences (Group 4), the arts (Group 6), foreign languages (Group 2) and mathematics (Group 5). In addition to taking seven IB classes during the two years, Andrew Hill Diploma candidates must also complete the Extended Essay (EE), a 4,000-word report, and the Creativity, action, service (CAS) profile.

Of the student population, 20% partake in at least one IB class in the school during their enrollment. Of those, 10.8% are full IB Diploma candidates, and 2.2% of the grade 12 students are IB Diploma candidates. On average, each student participating in IB from Andrew Hill takes 4.8 subject tests during their enrollment.

== Campus ==
The campus of Andrew Hill High School consists primarily of seven buildings of classrooms, two groups of portables, two gyms and locker rooms, a cafeteria attached to the music hall, and an administrative building attached to the library. The classroom buildings are named the "200", "300", "400", "500", "600", "S" buildings and Schaefer Hall., with the "100" building having been torn down in 2013 in order to construct a replacement. The portables are named the "B" and "C" portables, with the "A" portables taken down in the same construction as the "100" building. There are two gyms, one larger and one smaller, respectively named the "Large Gym" and "Small Gym". The music hall was renamed to Eschenfelder Hall in 2016, after music instructor Thomas Eschenfelder, who retired the same year.

== Notable alumni ==
- George Achica, former lineman in the USFL and NFL
- Steve Caballero, professional skateboarder.
- Jason M. Dahl, pilot of United Airlines Flight 93; Hillsdale Elementary School was renamed Captain Jason M. Dahl Elementary School in his honor
- Skip Spence, co-founder of Moby Grape and the original drummer for Jefferson Airplane; He attended Andrew P. Hill his freshman year (1962) before dropping out of high school in his sophomore year
- Mervyn Fernandez, former wide receiver in the CFL and NFL
- Mike Honda, U.S. Representative for California's 15th congressional district
- Jim McMahon, former NFL quarterback (attended 1973–1975)
- Jayson Obazuaye, former professional basketball player and ex-University of Colorado guard
- Andrew X. Pham, author
- Miguel Perez, actor and writer
- Traxamillion, hip hop producer associated with the Hyphy genre
- Daniel Valencia, photographer and artist

== See also ==
- Santa Clara County high schools
