= Santa Teresa High School =

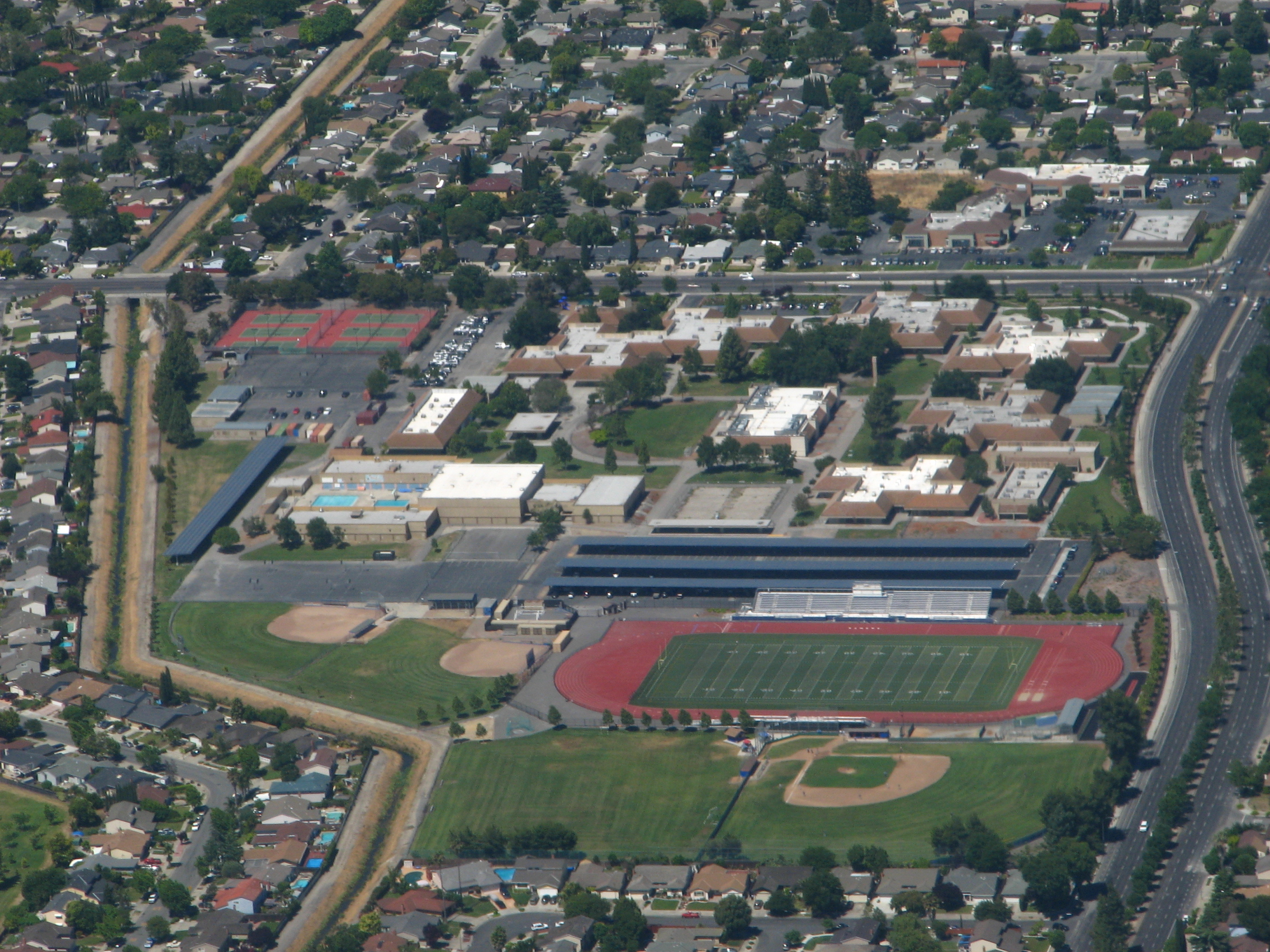
- Campus aerial view, June 2010

Location
- 6150 Snell Avenue; San Jose, Santa Clara County, California 95123-4740; United States
- 37.235377°N 121.829959°W

Information
- School type: Public high school
- Opened: July 1, 1974
- Status: Open; regular
- School district: East Side Union High School District
- NCES District ID: 0611820
- CEEB code: 053106
- NCES School ID: 061182001308
- Principal: Michael J. Payne-Alex
- Teaching staff: 97.82 (FTE)
- Grades: 9–12
- Gender: Mixed
- Enrollment: 2,181 (2023–2024)
- Student to teacher ratio: 22.30
- Schedule type: Block
- Schedule: Monday: 8:30 AM – 3:40 PM S Days: 8:30 AM – 4:05 PM T Days: 8:30 AM – 3:45 PM
- Campus type: Suburban
- Colors: Blue and orange
- Sports: Blossom Valley Athletic League
- Mascot: St. Bernard
- Nickname: Saints
- Rivals: Oak Grove High School, Leland High School
- USNWR ranking: 333 in California
- National ranking: 2,357
- Yearbook: Compendium
- Communities served: Santa Teresa
- Website: santateresahigh.esuhsd.org
- Last updated: 11:03, 26 March 2021 (PST)

Santa Teresa High School (also referred to as STHS or ST) is a public high school located in the suburban Santa Teresa neighborhood of southern San Jose, California. The school is a member of the East Side Union High School District and serves students from grades 9 through 12. The average student enrollment is 2,300 students, with an average ratio of 25 students for every teacher.

== History ==
The main campus of Santa Teresa High School was constructed in 1967 and officially opened on July 1, 1974. The school added a new bond-funded multi-purpose building in 2010 in addition to solar panels over the parking lots. A new signature building was constructed within the campus between 2021 and 2025. The building hosts counseling offices, tech support offices, as well as two classrooms for digital art or science programs.

The campus is also home to Phoenix High School, an alternative high school and member of the ESUHSD. Phoenix is housed within four portable buildings and a classroom in the 800 building of STHS. Phoenix is supervised by Santa Teresa High School staff members.

== Academics and student life ==
Santa Teresa High School has roughly 2,300 students, both male and female, and spans 9th through 12th grades. The average ratio at STHS is 25 students for every teacher. STHS serves as magnet school for ESUHSD and offers a specialty program in multimedia arts. As of the 2015–16 school year, STHS offered 21 Advanced Placement courses to its student body and 32% of the students enrolled in one or more of those courses. Between 2011 and 2015, STHS students dropped out at a lower rate and graduated at a higher rate compared to others in East Side Union High School District and the state of California. The U.S. News & World Report ranked STHS as the 275th best high school in California, and 1,512th nationally, for 2016.

Santa Teresa is home to over 50 student clubs on campus. Officially recognized student clubs include American Red Cross, California Scholarship Federation, FBLA-PBL, Interact, Key Club, Mathematics, Engineering, Science Achievement, Model United Nations, National Honor Society, and UNICEF. STHS is supported by a number of community organizations to assist the student body. Organized in 2004, the Santa Teresa Parent Teacher Organization, the school's Parent-Teacher Association, serves to advance the academic and social programs offered at STHS. The Santa Teresa Music and Arts Association, a school booster club, offers a performing arts curriculum with an emphasis on drama and band. The Santa Teresa Athletic Boosters Club is a non-profit which fundraisers to provide revenue to assist the athletic teams of STHS.

Santa Teresa High School hosts the annual Santa Clara Valley Model United Nations event as part of their Model United Nations club. Established in 1971, it is the second oldest and second largest conference on the west coast. Students from various Californian High Schools as well as foreign exchange students from Rome are among the participators.

== Athletics ==
The Saints, as the athletics teams of Santa Teresa High School are known, compete in CIF Central Coast Section's Blossom Valley Athletic League. From 1974 through Winter 2011, the Saints have won a combined 55 CCS championships. Additionally, Santa Teresa was home to two California state champions: the 1985 Girls 800-meter (Kristen Dowell) and the 1990 boys 800-meter (Craig Magness) runs. Santa Teresa currently has a rivalry with Oak Grove High School and formerly with Leland High School.

Soccer is a prominent sport for the school and the girls' team has been nationally ranked. The girls soccer team has won Central Coast Section (CCS) championships in 1987, 1991, 2001, 2002, and were co-champions with Woodside in 2013. The girls were also CCS championships finalists in 2003 and 2005. The boys team was CCS co-champions with Saint Francis in 1983. Between 1987 and 1991, former student-athlete Keri Sanchez lettered in five different sports for the Saints and appeared for the United States women's national soccer team as a senior. She was named the San Jose Mercury News soccer player of the year in 1991 and the High School Athlete of the Decade for the 1980s. Paul Bravo is also a former player for the Saints who went on to feature for the United States men's national soccer team.

Football is another flagship sport for the school. The team won its first CCS championship in 2022 over Branham. The team continued on as Division 6-AA NorCal champions over Palo Alto and ended as CIF 6-AA state finalists. In 1987, the Saints finished as CCS championship finalists. Several football alumni have played in the National Football League including Rich Campbell, Joe Nedney, and Craig Whelihan.

The Saints boys basketball team won their first CCS title in 2011. They were CCS championship finalists in 1991 and 2013.

The baseball team won their first CCS championship in 2023 after beating Palma.

=== Sports offered ===
==== Fall ====
- Cross Country (co-ed)
- Football (boys)
- Flag Football (girls)
- Golf (girls)
- Tennis (girls)
- Volleyball (girls)
- Water Polo (boys and girls)

==== Winter ====
- Basketball (boys and girls)
- Soccer (boys and girls)
- Traditional Competitive Cheer (co-ed)
- Wrestling (co-ed)

==== Spring ====
- Badminton (co-ed)
- Baseball (boys)
- Golf (boys)
- Softball (girls)
- Swimming and Diving (co-ed)
- Tennis (boys)
- Track and Field (co-ed)
- Volleyball (boys)

== Notable alumni and faculty ==
- Paul Bravo, former United States men's national soccer team and Major League Soccer player
- Michael Burry, hedge fund manager and physician
- Rich Campbell, former National Football League quarterback
- Todd Clever, former captain of the United States national rugby union team and former United States national rugby sevens team player
- James P. Delgado, Maritime archaeologist and author
- Chon Gallegos, former National Football League quarterback
- Bob LaMonte, sports agent
- Beau Leroux, Major League Soccer player for the San Jose Earthquakes
- Tegan McGrady, United States women's national soccer team and National Women's Soccer League player
- Gabe Morales, Major League Baseball umpire
- Joe Nedney, former National Football League kicker
- Randy Prescott, former indoor soccer player
- Keri Sanchez, former United States women's national soccer team player
- Craig Whelihan, former National Football League and Arena Football League quarterback

== See also ==
- Santa Clara County high schools
