= William C. Overfelt High School =

Location
- 1835 Cunningham Avenue; San Jose, California; US; 37°19′52″N 121°49′47″W

Information
- Type: Public high school
- Established: 1962
- School district: East Side Union High School District
- Principal: Vito Chiala
- Teaching staff: 71.55 (FTE)
- Grades: 9-12
- Enrollment: 1,367 (2023–2024)
- Student to teacher ratio: 19.11
- Colors: White, red and blue
- Mascot: Royal
- Yearbook: Citadel
- Website: William C. Overfelt High School

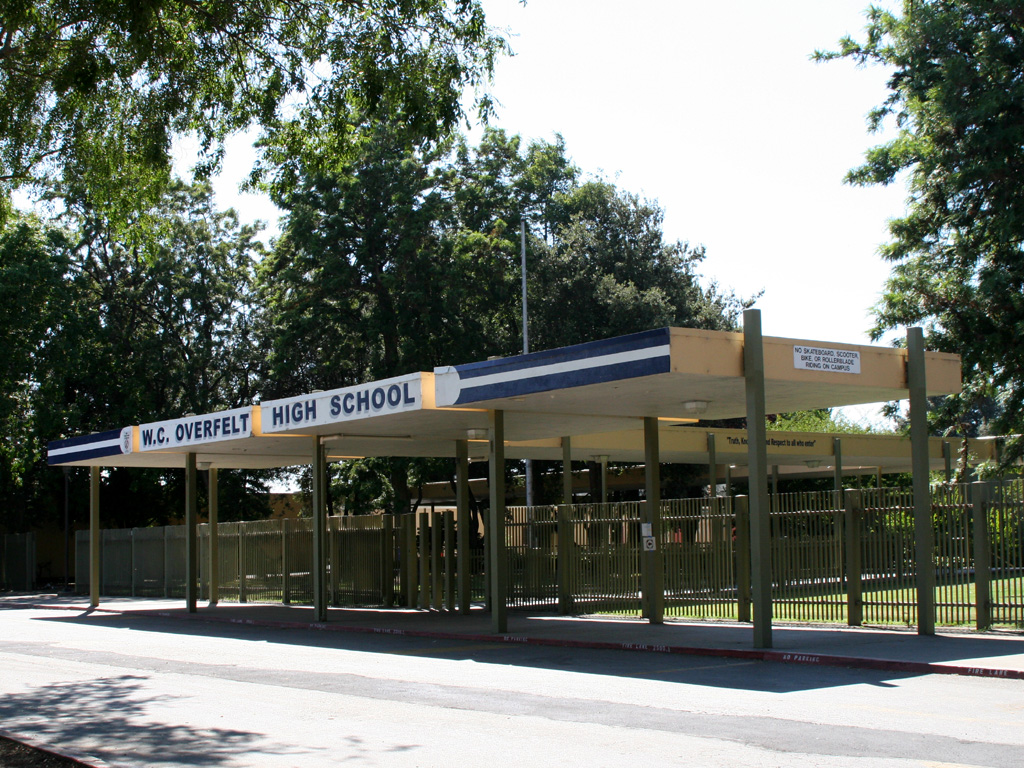
Entrance to Overfelt High School

William C. Overfelt High School is a public high school in the East San Jose area of San Jose, California. The principal is Vito Chiala. Overfelt opened in 1962, making it the third-oldest school in the East Side Union High School District. Since 2005, most of the classrooms have been replaced or modernized. Overfelt's yearbook, the Citadel, won National Scholastic Press Association Pacemaker awards in 1994, 1998, and 2000.

== Notable alumni ==
- Carol Speed: Actress, best known for her roles in films during the 1970s blaxploitation era.
- Lee Evans: Olympic Gold medal winner.
- Carl Monroe: NFL running back who scored a touchdown for the San Francisco 49ers in Super Bowl XIX.
- Jim Plunkett: NFL quarterback who won two Super Bowls.
- Nora Campos: politician, served on the San Jose City Council and in the California State Assembly.

== See also ==
- Santa Clara County high schools
