= Mt. Pleasant High School (San Jose, California) =

Location
- 1750 South White Road; San Jose, California 95127; United States
- Coordinates: 37°20′46″N 121°48′30″W

Information
- Type: Public
- Opened: 1964
- School district: East Side Union High School District
- Principal: Adriana Rangel
- Teaching staff: 54.82 (FTE)
- Grades: 9-12
- Enrollment: 998 (2024–2025)
- Student to teacher ratio: 20.23
- Colors: Red and black
- Athletics conference: CIF Central Coast Section Blossom Valley Athletic League
- Mascot: Cardinal
- Website: mtpleasant.esuhsd.org/

Mt. Pleasant High School is a public high school located in the Alum Rock district of San Jose, California. It is a part of the East Side Union High School District

== Steve Poizner ==
After selling his high-tech businesses, Steve Poizner worked at the school as a volunteer teacher, writing about it in Mount Pleasant: My Journey from Creating a Billion-Dollar Company to Teaching at a Struggling Public High School, a book released in April 2010. Poizner invoked hyperbole while describing the school, including exaggerating crime and graduation rates at the school and in the neighborhood. Ira Glass and This American Life exposed the differences between Poizner's account and the true story of the school, with Glass calling the story "obviously and provably untrue." Mt. Pleasant's high school principal, Teresa Marquez, cancelled Poizner's visit to the school, then Marquez and students protested the book at a book signing. The book reached the fifth position of the New York Times bestseller list, but that was possibly through altering of the sales data by ResultSource, a book marketing company. Ironically, the book title misspells the name of the school, as it is officially "Mt. Pleasant High School" and not "Mount Pleasant High School."

== Notable alumni ==
- Kenny Williams, Vice President of the Chicago White Sox
- Jeneba Tarmoh, member of the 2012 USA Olympic team, gold medal winner, 4 × 100 m Relay
- Jhonen Vasquez, comics artist and creator of the popular animated series Invader Zim

== See also ==
- Santa Clara County high schools
