= 2003 Kansas City Chiefs season =

NFL team season

- Owner: Lamar Hunt
- General manager: Carl Peterson
- Head coach: Dick Vermeil
- Home stadium: Arrowhead Stadium

Results
- Record: 13–3
- Division place: 1st AFC West
- Playoffs: Lost Divisional Playoffs (vs. Colts) 31–38
- All-Pros: 5: RB Priest Holmes (1st team); TE Tony Gonzalez (1st team); T Willie Roaf (1st team); G Will Shields (1st team); KR Dante Hall (1st team)
- Pro Bowlers: 9: QB Trent Green; RB Priest Holmes; FB Tony Richardson; TE Tony Gonzalez; T Willie Roaf; G Will Shields; S Jerome Woods; KR Dante Hall; ST Gary Stills

The 2003 season was the Kansas City Chiefs' 34th in the National Football League (NFL), their 44th overall and their third under head coach Dick Vermeil.

The season resulted in a 13–3 winning record, beginning with a nine-game winning streak—the franchise's best start in their 40-year history. The Chiefs won the AFC West and clinched the second seed in the playoffs to clinch their first playoff berth since 1997. Kansas City lost in an offensive shootout at home in the AFC Divisional Playoffs to the Indianapolis Colts 38–31, a game noted for involving no punts from either team's kicking squad.

The season is best remembered for the Chiefs' record-breaking offense. On December 28, running back Priest Holmes broke Marshall Faulk's single-season touchdown record, along with Emmitt Smith's single-season rushing touchdown record, by scoring his 27th rushing touchdown against the Chicago Bears. Quarterback Trent Green threw for 4,000 yards and kick returner Dante Hall returned four kicks for touchdowns. However, the Chiefs' defense would prove to be too big a weakness, as they failed to stop the Colts in the 2003-04 playoffs. The Chiefs offensive line from the season has frequently been considered one of the best offensive lines in NFL history. Two members of the offensive line, Will Shields and Willie Roaf, have been inducted in the Pro Football Hall of Fame along with the tight end from the team, Tony Gonzalez.

This would be the last season the Chiefs went undefeated at home until 2024.

== Offseason ==
=== Draft ===
The Chiefs originally had the 16th pick in the 2003 NFL draft. Vermeil was intent on selecting a defensive player, but felt that there were no defensive players available with their pick, and traded the pick to the Pittsburgh Steelers for the 27th pick, as well as the Steelers third and sixth-round picks. With the 27th overall pick in the 2003 NFL draft, the Kansas City Chiefs selected running back Larry Johnson from Penn State.

2003 Kansas City Chiefs draft
Round	Pick	Player	Position	College	Notes
1	27	Larry Johnson *	RB	Penn State	from Pittsburgh
2	47	Kawika Mitchell	LB	South Florida	
3	92	Julian Battle	DB	Tennessee	from Pittsburgh
4	113	Brett Williams	OT	Florida State	
5	153	Jordan Black	OT	Notre Dame	from New York Jets
6	189	Jimmy Wilkerson	DE	Oklahoma	from New York Jets
7	230	Montique Sharpe	DT	Wake Forest	
7	252	Willie Pile	LB	Virginia Tech	compensatory selection
Made roster * Made at least one Pro Bowl during career

== Personnel ==
=== Staff / Coaches ===
2003 Kansas City Chiefs staff
Front office: Founder – Lamar Hunt; President/general manager/chief executive officer – Carl Peterson; Chairman of the board – Jack Steadman; Vice chairman of the board – Clark Hunt; Executive vice president/assistant general manager – Dennis Thum; Vice president of football operations/player personnel – Lynn Stiles; Director of football administration – Mike White; Director of pro personnel – Bill Kuharich; Head coaches: Head coach – Dick Vermeil; Assistant head coach/offensive coordinator – Al Saunders; Offensive coaches: Quarterbacks – Terry Shea; Running backs – James Saxon; Wide receivers – Charlie Joiner; Tight ends – Keith Rowen; Offensive line – Mike Solari; Assistant offensive line – Irv Eatman; Offensive assistant/quality control – Jason Verduzco; Offensive quality control – Bob Saunders	Defensive coaches: Defensive coordinator – Greg Robinson; Defensive line – Carl Hairston; Defensive line – Bob Karmelowicz; Linebackers – Joe Vitt; Defensive backs – Peter Giunta; Defensive assistant/quality control – Darvin Wallis; Special teams coaches: Special teams – Frank Gansz Jr; Assistant special teams – Thomas McGaughey; Strength and conditioning: Strength and conditioning – Jeff Hurd; Assistant strength and conditioning – Billy Long

=== Final roster ===
2003 Kansas City Chiefs roster
Quarterbacks (QB): 15 Todd Collins; 10 Trent Green; 12 Jonathan Quinn; Running backs (RB): 23 Derrick Blaylock; 43 Omar Easy FB; 31 Priest Holmes; 27 Larry Johnson; 49 Tony Richardson FB; Wide receivers (WR): 85 Marc Boerigter; 82 Dante Hall; 87 Eddie Kennison; 80 Johnnie Morton; 84 LaShaun Ward; Tight ends (TE): 45 Billy Baber; 89 Jason Dunn; 88 Tony Gonzalez	Offensive linemen (OL): 65 Jordan Black T; 77 Willie Roaf T; 68 Will Shields G; 70 Marcus Spears T; 76 John Tait T; 54 Brian Waters G; 62 Casey Wiegmann C; 74 Brett Williams T; 60 Donald Willis G; Defensive linemen (DL): 93 John Browning DT; 92 Eric Downing DT; 71 Eddie Freeman DE; 98 Eric Hicks DE; 99 Vonnie Holliday DE; 61 Montique Sharpe DT; 90 Ryan Sims DT; 91 R-Kal Truluck DE; 66 Jimmy Wilkerson DE	Linebackers (LB): 59 Shawn Barber OLB; 56 Monty Beisel MLB; 52 Quinton Caver OLB; 51 Scott Fujita OLB; 53 Fred Jones OLB; 57 Mike Maslowski MLB; 50 Kawika Mitchell MLB; 55 Gary Stills OLB; Defensive backs (DB): 24 William Bartee CB; 26 Julian Battle CB; 38 Clint Finley SS; 42 Shaunard Harts FS; 22 Dexter McCleon CB; 44 Eric Warfield CB; 25 Greg Wesley SS; 21 Jerome Woods FS; Special teams (ST): 8 Morten Andersen K; 9 Jason Baker P; 83 Kendall Gammon LS	Practice squad: 48 Willie Ford CB; 46 Joe Hall FB; 18 Chris Horn WR; 35 Willie Pile S; 72 Darnell Alford T; Reserve: 41 Darrius Johnson S (IR); 30 Lyle West S (IR); Rookies in italics 53 active, 2 reserve, 5 practice squad

== Preseason ==
=== Schedule ===
Week	Date	Opponent	Result	Record	Venue	Recap
HOF	August 4	vs. Green Bay Packers	W 9–0	1–0	Fawcett Stadium (Canton)	Recap
1	August 9	San Francisco 49ers	L 6–24	1–1	Arrowhead Stadium	Recap
2	August 16	Minnesota Vikings	W 26–16	2–1	Arrowhead Stadium	Recap
3	August 23	at Seattle Seahawks	L 31–42	2–2	Seahawks Stadium	Recap
4	August 28	at St. Louis Rams	W 22–6	3–2	Edward Jones Dome	Recap

=== Game summaries ===
==== Hall of Fame Game: vs. Green Bay Packers ====
Hall of Fame Game: Green Bay Packers vs. Kansas City Chiefs – Game summary

Quarter	1	2	3	4	Total
Packers	0	0	0	0	0
Chiefs	3	3	3	0	9

at Fawcett Stadium, Canton, Ohio

- Date: August 4
- Game time: 8:00 p.m. EDT/7:00 p.m. CDT
- Game weather: Cloudy, 73 °F (23 °C)
- Game attendance: 22,385
- Referee: Jeff Triplette
- Recap, Game Book

Game information

First quarter

- KC – Morten Andersen 32-yard field goal, 8:19. Chiefs 3–0. Drive: 11 plays, 52 yards, 5:07.

Second quarter

- KC – Morten Andersen 51-yard field goal, 1:00. Chiefs 6–0. Drive: 4 plays, –9 yards, 0:39.

Third quarter

- KC – José Cortez 27-yard field goal, 5:55. Chiefs 9–0. Drive: 9 plays, 43 yards, 4:51.

Fourth quarter

- No scoring plays.

Top passers

- GB – Brett Favre – 4/6, 54 yards
- KC – Todd Collins – 12/16, 127 yards

Top rushers

- GB – Najeh Davenport – 9 rushes, 18 yards
- KC – Derrick Blaylock – 5 rushes, 18 yards

Top receivers

- GB – Javon Walker – 2 receptions, 30 yards
- KC – Billy Baber – 2 receptions, 47 yards

==== Week 1: vs. San Francisco 49ers ====
Week 1: San Francisco 49ers at Kansas City Chiefs – Game summary

Quarter	1	2	3	4	Total
49ers	0	7	7	10	24
Chiefs	0	6	0	0	6

at Arrowhead Stadium, Kansas City, Missouri

- Date: August 9
- Game time: 7:30 p.m. CDT
- Game weather: Clear, 89 °F (32 °C)
- Game attendance: 73,830
- Referee: Terry McAulay
- Recap, Game Book

Game information

First quarter

- No scoring plays.

Second quarter

- KC – Morten Andersen 23-yard field goal, 12:58. Chiefs 3–0. Drive: 15 plays, 76 yards, 4:20.
- SF – Brandon Lloyd 39-yard pass from Tim Rattay (Jeff Chandler kick), 10:55. 49ers 7–3. Drive: 4 plays, 58 yards, 2:03.
- KC – Morten Andersen 26-yard field goal, 0:13. 49ers 7–6. Drive: 11 plays, 73 yards, 4:23.

Third quarter

- SF – Arnaz Battle 15-yard pass from Ken Dorsey (Jeff Chandler kick), 11:29. 49ers 14–6. Drive: 4 plays, 60 yards, 1:57.

Fourth quarter

- SF – Jeff Chandler 27-yard field goal, 11:16. 49ers 17–6. Drive: 12 plays, 68 yards, 6:49.
- SF – Jasen Isom 2-yard pass from Ken Dorsey (Nate Fikse kick), 7:46. 49ers 24–6. Drive: 7 plays, 29 yards, 3:18.

Top passers

- SF – Brandon Doman – 11/12, 101 yards
- KC – Trent Green – 8/11, 80 yards

Top rushers

- SF – Jamal Robertson – 10 rushes, 70 yards
- KC – Derrick Blaylock – 11 rushes, 26 yards

Top receivers

- SF – Aaron Walker – 4 receptions, 42 yards
- KC – Johnnie Morton – 2 receptions, 47 yards

==== Week 2: vs. Minnesota Vikings ====
Week 2: Minnesota Vikings at Kansas City Chiefs – Game summary

Quarter	1	2	3	4	Total
Vikings	7	3	0	6	16
Chiefs	3	13	3	7	26

at Arrowhead Stadium, Kansas City, Missouri

- Date: August 16
- Game time: 7:30 p.m. CDT
- Game weather: Clear, 100 °F (38 °C)
- Game attendance: 73,830
- Referee: Bill Leavy
- Recap, Game Book

Game information

First quarter

- KC – Morten Andersen 38-yard field goal, 11:58. Chiefs 3–0. Drive: 10 plays, 38 yards, 3:02.
- MIN – Onterrio Smith 1-yard run (Todd France kick), 8:15. Vikings 7–3. Drive: 4 plays, 14 yards, 1:46.

Second quarter

- KC – Morten Andersen 21-yard field goal, 11:31. Vikings 7–6. Drive: 12 plays, 83 yards, 5:29.
- KC – Marc Boerigter 59-yard pass from Trent Green (Morten Andersen kick), 8:38. Chiefs 13–7. Drive: 2 plays, 76 yards, 0:34.
- MIN – Aaron Elling 48-yard field goal, 1:07. Chiefs 13–10. Drive: 7 plays, 31 yards, 1:57.
- KC – Morten Andersen 42-yard field goal, 0:00. Chiefs 16–10. Drive: 7 plays, 52 yards, 1:07.

Third quarter

- KC – José Cortez 46-yard field goal, 2:27. Chiefs 19–10. Drive: 7 plays, 54 yards, 3:07.

Fourth quarter

- KC – Dwayne Blakley 12-yard pass from Todd Collins (José Cortez kick), 10:48. Chiefs 26–10. Drive: 2 plays, 47 yards, 0:50.
- MIN – Nate Burleson 1-yard pass from Shaun Hill (pass failed), 4:18. Chiefs 26–16. Drive: 6 plays, 43 yards, 3:01.

Top passers

- MIN – Daunte Culpepper – 8/13, 68 yards
- KC – Trent Green – 7/13, 152 yards, TD

Top rushers

- MIN – Doug Chapman – 6 rushes, 34 yards
- KC – Derrick Blaylock – 6 rushes, 48 yards

Top receivers

- MIN – Nate Burleson – 6 receptions, 56 yards, TD
- KC – Marc Boerigter – 2 receptions, 85 yards, TD

==== Week 3: at Seattle Seahawks ====
Week 3: Kansas City Chiefs at Seattle Seahawks – Game summary

Quarter	1	2	3	4	Total
Chiefs	7	14	10	0	31
Seahawks	3	10	15	14	42

at Seahawks Stadium, Seattle, Washington

- Date: August 23
- Game time: 9:00 p.m. CDT/7:00 p.m. PDT
- Game weather: Overcast, 68 °F (20 °C)
- Game attendance: 39,833
- Referee: Ron Blum
- Recap, Game Book

Game information

First quarter

- SEA – Josh Brown 32-yard field goal, 9:19. Seahawks 3–0. Drive: 11 plays, 55 yards, 4:43.
- KC – Tony Gonzalez 14-yard pass from Trent Green (Morten Andersen kick), 3:30. Chiefs 7–3. Drive: 13 plays, 80 yards, 5:49.

Second quarter

- SEA – Heath Evans 5-yard pass from Matt Hasselbeck (Josh Brown kick), 11:11. Seahawks 10–7. Drive: 3 plays, 19 yards, 1:33.
- KC – Marc Boerigter 11-yard pass from Todd Collins (Morten Andersen kick), 8:01. Chiefs 14–10. Drive: 6 plays, 78 yards, 3:10.
- SEA – Josh Brown 50-yard field goal, 5:03. Chiefs 14–13. Drive: 6 plays, 40 yards, 2:58.
- KC – Jason Dunn 7-yard pass from Todd Collins (Morten Andersen kick), 0:43. Chiefs 21–13. Drive: 12 plays, 86 yards, 4:20.

Third quarter

- SEA – Darrell Jackson 3-yard pass from Matt Hasselbeck (Matt Hasselbeck–Shaun Alexander pass), 12:16. Tied 21–21. Drive: 8 plays, 77 yards, 2:44.
- KC – Larry Johnson 85-yard kickoff return (José Cortez kick), 12:05. Chiefs 28–21.
- SEA – Koren Robinson 19-yard pass from Trent Dilfer (Josh Brown kick), 7:31. Tied 28–28. Drive: 9 plays, 69 yards, 4:34.
- KC – José Cortez 40-yard field goal, 4:26. Chiefs 31–28. Drive: 4 plays, 8 yards, 1:33.

Fourth quarter

- SEA – Kerry Carter 17-yard run (Josh Brown kick), 12:07. Seahawks 35–31. Drive: 8 plays, 85 yards, 3:55.
- SEA – Kerry Carter 1-yard run (Josh Brown kick), 1:57. Seahawks 42–31. Drive: 11 plays, 66 yards, 6:35.

Top passers

- KC – Todd Collins – 12/18, 144 yards, 2 TD, INT
- SEA – Matt Hasselbeck – 17/23, 198 yards, 2 TD

Top rushers

- KC – Larry Johnson – 12 rushes, 77 yards
- SEA – Kerry Carter – 11 rushes, 53 yards, 2 TD

Top receivers

- KC – Snoop Minnis – 2 receptions, 48 yards
- SEA – Koren Robinson – 5 receptions, 77 yards, TD

==== Week 4: at St. Louis Rams ====
Week 4: Kansas City Chiefs at St. Louis Rams – Game summary

Quarter	1	2	3	4	Total
Chiefs	7	0	10	5	22
Rams	0	6	0	0	6

at Edward Jones Dome, St. Louis, Missouri

- Date: August 28
- Game time: 7:00 p.m. CDT
- Game weather: None (indoor stadium)
- Game attendance: 65,373
- Referee: Larry Nemmers
- Recap, Game Book

Game information

First quarter

- KC – Omar Easy 5-yard pass from Trent Green (Morten Andersen kick), 6:58. Chiefs 7–0. Drive: 7 plays, 73 yards, 4:01.

Second quarter

- STL – Jeff Wilkins 34-yard field goal, 9:02. Chiefs 7–3. Drive: 4 plays, 1 yard, 0:52.
- STL – Jeff Wilkins 39-yard field goal, 1:10. Chiefs 7–6. Drive: 11 plays, 40 yards, 5:36.

Third quarter

- KC – Snoop Minnis 50-yard pass from Jonathan Quinn (Morten Andersen kick), 5:38. Chiefs 14–6. Drive: 4 plays, 78 yards, 1:31.
- KC – Morten Andersen 29-yard field goal, 2:20. Chiefs 17–6. Drive: 5 plays, 42 yards, 2:02.

Fourth quarter

- KC – Morten Andersen 24-yard field goal, 14:56. Chiefs 20–6. Drive: 4 plays, 4 yards, 1:30.
- KC – Marc Bulger fumble forced by Jared Tomich out of bounds in end zone for a Safety, 8:00. Chiefs 22–6.

Top passers

- KC – Jonathan Quinn – 15/21, 231 yards, TD
- STL – Marc Bulger – 15/28, 158 yards, 2 INT

Top rushers

- KC – Derrick Blaylock – 5 rushes, 64 yards
- STL – Lamar Gordon – 8 rushes, 21 yards

Top receivers

- KC – Curtis Jackson – 5 receptions, 73 yards
- STL – Arlen Harris – 3 receptions, 51 yards

== Regular season ==
After beginning the 2003 season 9–0, the Chiefs finished the regular season with a record of 13–3. The Chiefs' offense topped the NFL in almost all statistical categories and Kansas City, at one point in the regular season, became favorites to win Super Bowl XXXVIII.

The Chiefs clinched their first AFC West title since 1997 with a 45–17 win against the Detroit Lions, as QB Trent Green became the first player in team history to register a "perfect" 158.3 passer rating in a game.

Kansas City concluded its 13–3 regular season with a 31–3 victory vs. Chicago (December 28), marking a perfect 8–0 a record at home and the club's 13th consecutive regular-season victory at Arrowhead Stadium. In that win, Priest Holmes set a trio of TD records. He finished the season with 27 rushing scores, establishing NFL single-season records for both rushing TDs and total TDs. Holmes (61) also bypassed WR Otis Taylor (60) for the most career TDs scored by a player in Chiefs history.

The Chief's five-win improvement from the previous season tied as the best mark in franchise history. Kansas City became the first AFC team to lead the NFL in scoring in consecutive seasons since San Diego in 1981–1982 as the club produced a franchise-best 484 points. The team also led the NFL with a +19 turnover differential.

Nine Chiefs players received Pro Bowl recognition, the third-highest total in team history, while the club's six offensive Pro Bowlers marked the most in club annals.

=== Schedule ===
Week	Date	Opponent	Result	Record	Venue	Recap
1	September 7	**San Diego Chargers**	**W** 27–14	1–0	Arrowhead Stadium	Recap
2	September 14	Pittsburgh Steelers	**W** 41–20	2–0	Arrowhead Stadium	Recap
3	September 21	at Houston Texans	**W** 42–14	3–0	Reliant Stadium	Recap
4	September 28	at Baltimore Ravens	**W** 17–10	4–0	M&T Bank Stadium	Recap
5	October 5	**Denver Broncos**	**W** 24–23	5–0	Arrowhead Stadium	Recap
6	October 12	at Green Bay Packers	**W** 40–34 (OT)	6–0	Lambeau Field	Recap
7	October 20	at **Oakland Raiders**	**W** 17–10	7–0	Network Associates Coliseum	Recap
8	October 26	Buffalo Bills	**W** 38–5	8–0	Arrowhead Stadium	Recap
9	Bye					
10	November 9	Cleveland Browns	**W** 41–20	9–0	Arrowhead Stadium	Recap
11	November 16	at Cincinnati Bengals	**L** 19–24	9–1	Paul Brown Stadium	Recap
12	November 23	**Oakland Raiders**	**W** 27–24	10–1	Arrowhead Stadium	Recap
13	November 30	at **San Diego Chargers**	**W** 28–24	11–1	Qualcomm Stadium	Recap
14	December 7	at **Denver Broncos**	**L** 27–45	11–2	Invesco Field at Mile High	Recap
15	December 14	Detroit Lions	**W** 45–17	12–2	Arrowhead Stadium	Recap
16	December 20	at Minnesota Vikings	**L** 20–45	12–3	Hubert H. Humphrey Metrodome	Recap
17	December 28	Chicago Bears	**W** 31–3	13–3	Arrowhead Stadium	Recap

Note: Intra-division opponents are in bold text.

=== Game summaries ===
==== Week 1: vs. San Diego Chargers ====
Week 1: San Diego Chargers at Kansas City Chiefs – Game summary

Quarter	1	2	3	4	Total
Chargers	0	0	7	7	**14**
**Chiefs**	14	10	3	0	**27**

at Arrowhead Stadium, Kansas City, Missouri

- Date: September 7
- Game time: 12:00 p.m. CDT
- Game weather: Clear, 77 °F (25 °C)
- Game attendance: 78,048
- Referee: Ed Hochuli
- TV announcers (CBS): Greg Gumbel, Phil Simms and Armen Keteyian
- Recap, Game Book

Game information

**First quarter**

- KC – Priest Holmes 24-yard run (Morten Andersen kick), 11:37. Chiefs 7–0. **Drive: 6 plays, 68 yards, 3:23.**
- KC – Priest Holmes 5-yard run (Morten Andersen kick), 1:21. Chiefs 14–0. **Drive: 9 plays, 59 yards, 4:04.**

**Second quarter**

- KC – Johnnie Morton 20-yard pass from Trent Green (Morten Andersen kick), 10:08. Chiefs 21–0. **Drive: 6 plays, 72 yards, 2:47.**
- KC – Morten Andersen 42-yard field goal, 4:25. Chiefs 24–0. **Drive: 6 plays, 29 yards, 3:17.**

**Third quarter**

- SD – Josh Norman 21-yard pass from Drew Brees (Steve Christie kick), 8:16. Chiefs 24–7. **Drive: 5 plays, 51 yards, 2:16.**
- KC – Morten Andersen 46-yard field goal, 2:22. Chiefs 27–7. **Drive: 10 plays, 37 yards, 5:54.**

**Fourth quarter**

- SD – Eric Parker 20-yard pass from Drew Brees (Steve Christie kick), 4:32. Chiefs 27–14. **Drive: 6 plays, 67 yards, 2:31.**

**Top passers**

- SD – Drew Brees – 18/33, 202 yards, 2 TD, 2 INT
- KC – Trent Green – 21/32, 282 yards, TD, INT

**Top rushers**

- SD – LaDainian Tomlinson – 13 rushes, 34 yards
- KC – Priest Holmes – 18 rushes, 85 yards, 2 TD

**Top receivers**

- SD – Josh Norman – 4 receptions, 64 yards, TD
- KC – Priest Holmes – 7 receptions, 98 yards

The Chiefs hosted San Diego and raced to a 24–0 lead behind two Priest Holmes rushing scores and a Trent Green touchdown to Johnnie Morton. Drew Brees of the Chargers was intercepted twice in the 27–14 Chiefs win.

==== Week 2: vs. Pittsburgh Steelers ====
Week 2: Pittsburgh Steelers at Kansas City Chiefs – Game summary

Quarter	1	2	3	4	Total
Steelers	17	3	0	0	**20**
**Chiefs**	7	20	7	7	**41**

at Arrowhead Stadium, Kansas City, Missouri

- Date: September 14
- Game time: 12:00 p.m. CDT
- Game weather: Clear, 67 °F (19 °C)
- Game attendance: 78,416
- Referee: Larry Nemmers
- TV announcers (CBS): Kevin Harlan and Randy Cross
- Recap, Game Book

Game information

**First quarter**

- PIT – Chad Scott 26-yard interception return (Jeff Reed kick), 14:12. Steelers 7–0.
- PIT – Jeff Reed 20-yard field goal, 9:48. Steelers 10–0. **Drive: 5 plays, 55 yards, 2:45.**
- KC – Dante Hall 100-yard kickoff return (Morten Andersen kick), 9:35. Steelers 10–7. **Drive: 0 plays, 0 yards, 0:13.**
- PIT – Plaxico Burress 33-yard pass from Tommy Maddox (Jeff Reed kick), 3:27. Steelers 17–7. **Drive: 1 play, 33 yards, 0:06.**

**Second quarter**

- KC – Priest Holmes 3-yard run (Morten Andersen kick), 12:49. Steelers 17–14. **Drive: 11 plays, 72 yards, 5:38.**
- KC – Jason Dunn 3-yard pass from Trent Green (Morten Andersen kick), 4:50. Chiefs 21–17. **Drive: 10 plays, 86 yards, 4:59.**
- KC – Jerome Woods 46-yard interception return (kick failed, hit right upright), 2:25. Chiefs 27–17.
- PIT – Jeff Reed 51-yard field goal, 0:00. Chiefs 27–20. **Drive: 9 plays, 38 yards, 2:25.**

**Third quarter**

- KC – Priest Holmes 4-yard run (Morten Andersen kick), 12:10. Chiefs 34–20. **Drive: 2 plays, 7 yards, 0:40.**

**Fourth quarter**

- KC – Priest Holmes 31-yard run (Morten Andersen kick), 5:06. Chiefs 41–20. **Drive: 5 plays, 63 yards, 2:50.**

**Top passers**

- PIT – Tommy Maddox – 28/47, 336 yards, TD, 3 INT
- KC – Trent Green – 15/21, 124 yards, TD, 2 INT

**Top rushers**

- PIT – Amos Zereoué – 11 rushes, 48 yards
- KC – Priest Holmes – 26 rushes, 122 yards, 3 TD

**Top receivers**

- PIT – Hines Ward – 9 receptions, 146 yards
- KC – Johnnie Morton – 4 receptions, 44 yards

The Steelers scored first on a Chad Scott interception, but after leading 10–0 Pittsburgh was torched by Dante Hall’s 100-yard kick return score. Priest Holmes ran in three touchdowns while Steelers quarterback Tommy Maddox was intercepted three times including one returned for a touchdown by Jerome Woods in a 41–20 Chiefs win. During halftime the chiefs held a ceremony honoring former head coach Hank Stram inducting him into the ring of honor at Arrowhead Stadium.

==== Week 3: at Houston Texans ====
Week 3: Kansas City Chiefs at Houston Texans – Game summary

Quarter	1	2	3	4	Total
**Chiefs**	7	7	14	14	**42**
Texans	0	7	0	7	**14**

at Reliant Stadium, Houston, Texas

- Date: September 21
- Game time: 12:00 p.m. CDT
- Game weather: None (retractable roof closed)
- Game attendance: 70,487
- Referee: Ron Blum
- TV announcers (CBS): Kevin Harlan and Randy Cross
- Recap, Game Book

Game information

**First quarter**

- KC – Priest Holmes 6-yard run (Morten Andersen kick), 8:37. Chiefs 7–0. **Drive: 6 plays, 84 yards, 2:48.**

**Second quarter**

- HOU – Andre Johnson 43-yard pass from David Carr (Kris Brown kick), 5:47. Tied 7–7. **Drive: 9 plays, 96 yards, 5:47.**
- KC – Priest Holmes 5-yard run (Morten Andersen kick), 0:13. Chiefs 14–7. **Drive: 14 plays, 69 yards, 5:34.**

**Third quarter**

- KC – Eddie Kennison 15-yard pass from Trent Green (Morten Andersen kick), 3:14. Chiefs 21–7. **Drive: 3 plays, 32 yards, 1:24.**
- KC – Dante Hall 73-yard punt return (Morten Andersen kick), 1:28. Chiefs 28–7.

**Fourth quarter**

- KC – Derrick Blaylock 20-yard run (Morten Andersen kick), 13:58. Chiefs 35–7. **Drive: 3 plays, 85 yards, 0:49.**
- KC – Shaunard Harts 39-yard interception return (Morten Andersen kick), 7:00. Chiefs 42–7.
- HOU – Andre Johnson 4-yard pass from Tony Banks (Kris Brown kick), 1:54. Chiefs 42–14. **Drive: 16 plays, 73 yards, 5:06.**

**Top passers**

- KC – Trent Green – 16/28, 262 yards, TD, 2 INT
- HOU – David Carr – 17/27, 167 yards, TD, 2 INT

**Top rushers**

- KC – Priest Holmes – 18 rushes, 89 yards, 2 TD
- HOU – Stacey Mack – 13 rushes, 39 yards

**Top receivers**

- KC – Priest Holmes – 4 receptions, 67 yards
- HOU – Andre Johnson – 7 receptions, 102 yards, 2 TD

The Chiefs made their first trip to Houston since September 1996, now playing in Reliant Stadium next door to the Astrodome. Kansas City's aggregate winning streak against Houston NFL teams reached five as Houston was hammered 42–14 despite two Trent Green interceptions. The Chiefs rushed for 168 yards and three touchdowns.

==== Week 4: at Baltimore Ravens ====
Week 4: Kansas City Chiefs at Baltimore Ravens – Game summary

Quarter	1	2	3	4	Total
**Chiefs**	0	3	7	7	**17**
Ravens	0	0	3	7	**10**

at M&T Bank Stadium, Baltimore, Maryland

- Date: September 28
- Game time: 4:05 p.m. EDT/3:05 p.m. CDT
- Game weather: Mostly cloudy, 70 °F (21 °C)
- Game attendance: 69,459
- Referee: Terry McAulay
- TV announcers (CBS): Kevin Harlan and Randy Cross
- Recap, Game Book

Game information

**First quarter**

- No scoring plays.

**Second quarter**

- KC – Morten Anderson 46-yard field goal, 3:23. Chiefs 3–0. **Drive: 10 plays, 45 yards, 4:54.**

**Third quarter**

- BAL – Matt Stover 29-yard field goal, 10:01. Tied 3–3. **Drive: 10 plays, 67 yards, 4:59.**
- KC – Tony Gonzalez 1-yard pass from Trent Green (Morten Andersen kick), 5:43. Chiefs 10–3. **Drive: 7 plays, 76 yards, 4:18.**

**Fourth quarter**

- BAL – Jamal Lewis 1-yard run (Matt Stover kick), 5:27. Tied 10–10. **Drive: 9 plays, 44 yards, 5:15.**
- KC – Dante Hall 97-yard kickoff return (Morten Andersen kick), 5:08. Chiefs 17–10. **Drive: 0 plays, 0 yards, 0:19.**

**Top passers**

- KC – Trent Green – 17/28, 159 yards, TD
- BAL – Kyle Boller – 15/26, 140 yards, 3 INT

**Top rushers**

- KC – Priest Holmes – 22 rushes, 90 yards
- BAL – Jamal Lewis – 26 rushes, 115 yards, TD

**Top receivers**

- KC – Johnnie Morton – 5 receptions, 73 yards
- BAL – Todd Heap – 4 receptions, 48 yards

The Ravens held the Chiefs to 265 yards of offense and out-rushed them 202 yards (Jamal Lewis accounted for 115 yards and the tying touchdown in the final six minutes) to 129, but Dante Hall raced in the winning score (17–10 Chiefs) on the kickoff following Lewis’ score and Kyle Boller was intercepted at the Chiefs 2-yard line in the final minute. Ex-Raven Priest Holmes had 25 touches (22 carries and four catches) for a combined 103 yards.

==== Week 5: vs. Denver Broncos ====
Week 5: Denver Broncos at Kansas City Chiefs – Game summary

Quarter	1	2	3	4	Total
Broncos	7	6	7	3	**23**
**Chiefs**	7	3	7	7	**24**

at Arrowhead Stadium, Kansas City, Missouri

- Date: October 5
- Game time: 12:00 p.m. CDT
- Game weather: Clear, 69 °F (21 °C)
- Game attendance: 78,903
- Referee: Bill Leavy
- TV announcers (CBS): Kevin Harlan and Randy Cross
- Recap, Game Book

Game information

**First quarter**

- DEN – Dwayne Carswell 6-yard pass from Jake Plummer (Jason Elam kick), 5:16. Broncos 7–0. **Drive: 3 plays, 80 yards, 1:21.**
- KC – Tony Gonzalez 20-yard pass from Trent Green (Morten Andersen kick), 3:08. Tied 7–7. **Drive: 3 plays, 25 yards, 0:54.**

**Second quarter**

- DEN – Jason Elam 48-yard field goal, 12:28. Broncos 10–7. **Drive: 8 plays, 17 yards, 3:17.**
- KC – Morten Andersen 23-yard field goal, 5:54. Tied 10–10. **Drive: 13 plays, 71 yards, 6:34.**
- DEN – Jason Elam 29-yard field goal, 0:05. Broncos 13–10. **Drive: 10 plays, 62 yards, 1:16.**

**Third quarter**

- DEN – Clinton Portis 65-yard run (Jason Elam kick), 13:30. Broncos 20–10. **Drive: 3 plays, 74 yards, 1:30.**
- KC – Johnnie Morton 28-yard pass from Trent Green (Morten Andersen kick), 10:49. Broncos 20–17. **Drive: 5 plays, 77 yards, 2:41.**

**Fourth quarter**

- DEN – Jason Elam 21-yard field goal, 13:42. Broncos 23–17. **Drive: 15 plays, 68 yards, 7:41.**
- KC – Dante Hall 93-yard punt return (Morten Andersen kick), 8:20. Chiefs 24–23.

**Top passers**

- DEN – Jake Plummer – 20/38, 220 yards, TD
- KC – Trent Green – 15/28, 129 yards, 2 TD, INT

**Top rushers**

- DEN – Clinton Portis – 23 rushes, 141 yards, TD
- KC – Priest Holmes – 17 rushes, 97 yards

**Top receivers**

- DEN – Rod Smith – 8 receptions, 130 yards
- KC – Tony Gonzalez – 3 receptions, 47 yards, TD

Dante Hall’s signature touchdown came in the fourth quarter with the 4–0 Chiefs trailing 23–17 against the 4–0 Broncos. In the final nine minutes, he caught a punt, was chased back to his three-yard line, then cut left, and stormed past the Denver punt coverage unit to score. Jason Elam missed a Broncos field goal attempt but Priest Holmes fumbled at the Broncos eight-yard line. Jake Plummer advanced the Broncos to their 28 but went no further.

The Chief's 24–23 win came despite being outgained in yardage 468-262 and despite two turnovers to one by Denver.

==== Week 6: at Green Bay Packers ====
Week 6: Kansas City Chiefs at Green Bay Packers – Game summary

Quarter	1	2	3	4	OT	Total
**Chiefs**	7	7	0	20	6	**40**
Packers	14	7	10	3	0	**34**

at Lambeau Field, Green Bay, Wisconsin

- Date: October 12
- Game time: 12:00 p.m. CDT
- Game weather: Clear and sunny, 60 °F (16 °C)
- Game attendance: 70,407
- Referee: Ron Winter
- TV announcers (CBS): Dick Enberg, Dan Dierdorf and Bonnie Bernstein
- Recap, Game Book

Game information

**First quarter**

- GB – Bubba Franks 1-yard pass from Brett Favre (Ryan Longwell kick), 7:14. Packers 7–0. **Drive: 11 plays, 80 yards, 6:17.**
- GB – Ahman Green 4-yard run (Ryan Longwell kick), 2:39. Packers 14–0. **Drive: 6 plays, 74 yards, 2:34.**
- KC – Tony Gonzalez 26-yard pass from Trent Green (Morten Andersen kick), 0:36. Packers 14–7. **Drive: 6 plays, 80 yards, 2:03.**

**Second quarter**

- KC – Johnnie Morton 10-yard pass from Trent Green (Morten Andersen kick), 9:16. Tied 14–14. **Drive: 8 plays, 55 yards, 4:14.**
- GB – Ahman Green 11-yard pass from Brett Favre (Ryan Longwell kick), 2:14. Packers 21–14. **Drive: 14 plays, 80 yards, 7:02.**

**Third quarter**

- GB – Najeh Davenport 18-yard run (Ryan Longwell kick), 10:47. Packers 28–14. **Drive: 8 plays, 76 yards, 4:13.**
- GB – Ryan Longwell 50-yard field goal, 6:01. Packers 31–14. **Drive: 7 plays, 19 yards, 3:06.**

**Fourth quarter**

- KC – Priest Holmes 1-yard run (Morten Andersen kick), 12:20. Packers 31–21. **Drive: 6 plays, 42 yards, 2:04.**
- KC – Jerome Woods 79-yard interception return (Morten Andersen kick), 8:46. Packers 31–28
- KC – Morten Andersen 34-yard field goal, 5:41. Tied 31–31. **Drive: 5 plays, 63 yards, 1:42.**
- GB – Ryan Longwell 41-yard field goal, 2:43. Packers 34–31. **Drive: 7 plays, 48 yards, 2:58.**
- KC – Morten Andersen 31-yard field goal, 0:01. Tied 34–34. **Drive: 12 plays, 77 yards, 2:42.**

**Overtime**

- KC – Eddie Kennison 51-yard pass from Trent Green, 8:42. Chiefs 40–34. **Drive: 1 play, 51 yards, 0:08.**

**Top passers**

- KC – Trent Green – 27/45, 400 yards, 3 TD
- GB – Brett Favre – 25/36, 272 yards, 2 TD, INT

**Top rushers**

- KC – Priest Holmes – 22 rushes, 81 yards, TD
- GB – Ahman Green – 26 rushes, 139 yards, TD

**Top receivers**

- KC – Tony Gonzalez – 4 receptions, 121 yards, TD
- GB – Donald Driver – 7 receptions, 59 yards

This edition of the rematch series from the first AFL-NFL World Championship Game became one of the most competitive games of the season. The Packers raced to a 14–0 lead before two Trent Green touchdowns tied the game. The Packers scored seventeen straight points in the second and third quarters but early in the fourth Priest Holmes scored. Brett Favre was then intercepted by Jerome Woods at the Chiefs 21 and Woods scored. Exchanges of field goals (Morten Anderson’s 31-yard kick came with one second left) left the game tied 31–31. The Chiefs in overtime called eight straight Holmes rushes before trying a 48-yard field goal; the kick was blocked by Cletidus Hunt. On the Packers possession Ahman Green was immediately stopped by Woods and Woods forced the fumble recovered at the Chiefs 49; Trent Green then unloaded deep to Eddie Kennison and Kennison scored, thus ending a 40–34 Chiefs triumph.

==== Week 7: at Oakland Raiders ====
Week 7: Kansas City Chiefs at Oakland Raiders – Game summary

Quarter	1	2	3	4	Total
**Chiefs**	7	3	0	7	**17**
Raiders	0	0	0	10	**10**

at Network Associates Coliseum, Oakland, California

- Date: October 20
- Game time: 8:00 p.m. CDT/6:00 p.m. PDT
- Game weather: Sunny, 75 °F (24 °C)
- Game attendance: 62,391
- Referee: Mike Carey
- TV announcers (ABC): Al Michaels, John Madden and Lisa Guerrero
- Recap, Game Book

Game information

**First quarter**

- KC – Trent Green 2-yard run (Morten Andersen kick), 4:16. Chiefs 7–0. **Drive: 3 plays, 44 yards, 1:18.**

**Second quarter**

- KC – Morten Andersen 37-yard field goal, 1:07. Chiefs 10–0. **Drive: 7 plays, 55 yards, 3:19.**

**Third quarter**

- No scoring plays.

**Fourth quarter**

- OAK – Sebastian Janikowski 27-yard field goal, 8:06. Chiefs 10–3. **Drive: 13 plays, 80 yards, 5:49.**
- KC – Priest Holmes 2-yard run (Morten Andersen kick), 4:57. Chiefs 17–3. **Drive: 3 plays, 11 yards, 1:24.**
- OAK – Zack Crockett 1-yard run (Sebastian Janikowski kick), 2:25. Chiefs 17–10. **Drive: 7 plays, 65 yards, 2:32.**

**Top passers**

- KC – Trent Green – 11/22, 206 yards, INT
- OAK – Marques Tuiasosopo – 16/28, 224 yards, INT

**Top rushers**

- KC – Priest Holmes – 27 rushes, 123 yards, TD
- OAK – Charlie Garner – 10 rushes, 32 yards

**Top receivers**

- KC – Tony Gonzalez – 3 receptions, 87 yards
- OAK – Charlie Garner – 8 receptions, 71 yards

==== Week 8: vs. Buffalo Bills ====
Week 8: Buffalo Bills at Kansas City Chiefs – Game summary

Quarter	1	2	3	4	Total
Bills	2	3	0	0	**5**
**Chiefs**	7	21	0	10	**38**

at Arrowhead Stadium, Kansas City, Missouri

- Date: October 26
- Game time: 7:30 p.m. CST
- Game weather: Cloudy, 45 °F (7 °C)
- Game attendance: 78,689
- Referee: Ed Hochuli
- TV announcers (ESPN): Mike Patrick, Joe Theismann, Paul Maguire and Suzy Kolber
- Recap, Game Book

Game information

**First quarter**

- BUF – Punt blocked by Pierson Prioleau out of bounds in end zone for a Safety, 10:39. Bills 2–0.
- KC – Dante Hall 67-yard pass from Trent Green (Morten Andersen kick), 5:12. Chiefs 7–2. **Drive: 4 plays, 80 yards, 1:09.**

**Second quarter**

- KC – Priest Holmes 4-yard run (Morten Andersen kick), 14:16. Chiefs 14–2. **Drive: 6 plays, 61 yards, 2:36.**
- KC – Priest Holmes 13-yard run (Morten Andersen kick), 7:35. Chiefs 21–2. **Drive: 8 plays, 55 yards, 4:19.**
- BUF – Rian Lindell 20-yard field goal, 2:56. Chiefs 21–5. **Drive: 10 plays, 54 yards, 4:39.**
- KC – Tony Gonzalez 1-yard pass from Trent Green (Morten Andersen kick), 0:10. Chiefs 28–5. **Drive: 9 plays, 83 yards, 2:46.**

**Third quarter**

- No scoring plays.

**Fourth quarter**

- KC – Priest Holmes 15-yard run (Morten Andersen kick), 7:16. Chiefs 35–5. **Drive: 1 play, 15 yards, 0:09.**
- KC – Morten Andersen 49-yard field goal, 4:02. Chiefs 38–5. **Drive: 4 plays, −10 yards, 1:40.**

**Top passers**

- BUF – Drew Bledsoe – 23/34, 153 yards, 3 INT
- KC – Trent Green – 20/35, 273 yards, 2 TD

**Top rushers**

- BUF – Travis Henry – 22 rushes, 124 yards
- KC – Priest Holmes – 15 rushes, 83 yards, 3 TD

**Top receivers**

- BUF – Josh Reed – 8 receptions, 59 yards
- KC – Dante Hall – 4 receptions, 107 yards, TD

Despite 124 rushing yards from Travis Henry and getting a safety on a Kansas City punt, the Bills were humiliated 38–5. Drew Bledsoe was intercepted three times and Alex Van Pelt two more while Trent Green had two touchdowns and 273 yards.

==== Week 10: vs. Cleveland Browns ====
Week 10: Cleveland Browns at Kansas City Chiefs – Game summary

Quarter	1	2	3	4	Total
Browns	3	14	3	0	**20**
**Chiefs**	14	13	7	7	**41**

at Arrowhead Stadium, Kansas City, Missouri

- Date: November 9
- Game time: 12:00 p.m. CST
- Game weather: Cloudy, 45 °F (7 °C)
- Game attendance: 78,560
- Referee: Pete Morelli
- TV announcers (CBS): Dick Enberg, Dan Dierdorf and Bonnie Bernstein
- Recap, Game Book

Game information

**First quarter**

- CLE – Phil Dawson 50-yard field goal, 11:31. Browns 3–0. **Drive: 5 plays, 19 yards, 2:44.**
- KC – Priest Holmes 1-yard run (Morten Andersen kick), 5:05. Chiefs 7–3. **Drive: 9 plays, 68 yards, 6:26.**
- KC – Priest Holmes 9-yard run (Morten Andersen kick), 0:19. Chiefs 14–3. **Drive: 7 plays, 52 yards, 3:46.**

**Second quarter**

- CLE – James Jackson 1-yard run (Phil Dawson kick), 11:53. Chiefs 14–10. **Drive: 8 plays, 73 yards, 3:26.**
- KC – Tony Gonzalez 14-yard pass from Trent Green (Morten Andersen kick), 9:11. Chiefs 21–10. **Drive: 7 plays, 62 yards, 2:42.**
- CLE – R. J. Bowers 2-yard pass from Kelly Holcomb (Phil Dawson kick), 4:54. Chiefs 21–17. **Drive: 4 plays, 21 yards, 1:52.**
- KC – Morten Andersen 29-yard field goal, 3:13. Chiefs 24–17. **Drive: 4 plays, 5 yards, 1:41.**
- KC – Morten Andersen 27-yard field goal, 0:00. Chiefs 27–17. **Drive: 10 plays, 72 yards, 1:38.**

**Third quarter**

- KC – Johnnie Morton 28-yard pass from Trent Green (Morten Andersen kick), 7:16. Chiefs 34–17. **Drive: 10 plays, 88 yards, 4:51.**
- CLE – Phil Dawson 22-yard field goal, 0:41. Chiefs 34–20. **Drive: 12 plays, 58 yards, 6:35.**

**Fourth quarter**

- KC – Eddie Kennison 27-yard pass from Trent Green (Morten Andersen kick), 2:19. Chiefs 41–20. **Drive: 12 plays, 76 yards, 5:06.**

**Top passers**

- CLE – Kelly Holcomb – 19/27, 149 yards, TD, INT
- KC – Trent Green – 29/42, 368 yards, 3 TD

**Top rushers**

- CLE – James Jackson – 17 rushes, 66 yards, TD
- KC – Priest Holmes – 19 rushes, 92 yards, 2 TD

**Top receivers**

- CLE – André Davis – 3 receptions, 35 yards
- KC – Eddie Kennison – 7 receptions, 115 yards, TD

Trent Green had 368 yards and three touchdowns, Priest Holmes added two scores on the ground, and the Browns were limited to 199 yards of offense in a 41–20 Chiefs win. During halftime the chiefs in a ceremony honored their former running back Marcus Allen inducting him into the ring of honor.

==== Week 11: at Cincinnati Bengals ====
Week 11: Kansas City Chiefs at Cincinnati Bengals – Game summary

Quarter	1	2	3	4	Total
Chiefs	0	3	3	13	**19**
**Bengals**	0	3	7	14	**24**

at Paul Brown Stadium, Cincinnati, Ohio

- Date: November 16
- Game time: 1:00 p.m. EST/12:00 p.m. CST
- Game weather: Cloudy, possible showers, 54 °F (12 °C)
- Game attendance: 64,923
- Referee: Jeff Triplette
- TV announcers (CBS): Kevin Harlan, Randy Cross and Marcus Allen
- Recap, Game Book

Game information

**First quarter**

- No scoring plays.

**Second quarter**

- CIN – Shayne Graham 27-yard field goal, 6:18. Bengals 3–0. **Drive: 12 plays, 74 yards, 4:59.**
- KC – Morten Anderson 37-yard field goal, 0:00. Tied 3–3. **Drive: 8 plays, 43 yards, 0:57.**

**Third quarter**

- KC – Morten Anderson 39-yard field goal, 10:32. Chiefs 6–3. **Drive: 8 plays, 54 yards, 4:28.**
- CIN – Jeremi Johnson 13-yard pass from Jon Kitna (Shayne Graham kick), 5:04. Bengals 10–6. **Drive: 10 plays, 63 yards, 5:28.**

**Fourth quarter**

- CIN – Peter Warrick 68-yard punt return (Shayne Graham kick), 12:47. Bengals 17–6.
- KC – Tony Gonzalez 12-yard pass from Trent Green (pass failed), 6:24. Bengals 17–12. **Drive: 5 plays, 92 yards, 2:40.**
- CIN – Peter Warrick 77-yard pass from Jon Kitna (Shayne Graham kick), 6:05. Bengals 24–12. **Drive: 1 play, 77 yards, 0:19.**
- KC – Jason Dunn 3-yard pass from Trent Green (Morten Anderson kick), 3:19. Bengals 24–19. **Drive: 12 plays, 71 yards, 2:46.**

**Top passers**

- KC – Trent Green – 28/42, 313 yards, 2 TD
- CIN – Jon Kitna – 19/32, 233 yards, 2 TD

**Top rushers**

- KC – Priest Holmes – 16 rushes, 62 yards
- CIN – Rudi Johnson – 22 rushes, 165 yards

**Top receivers**

- KC – Johnnie Morton – 7 receptions, 96 yards
- CIN – Peter Warrick – 6 receptions, 114 yards, TD

An undefeated season (attending Miami's overtime win over the Ravens members of the 1972 Dolphins kept a close watch on this game) would not transpire as the Bengals surged to their fifth win, fulfilling a pregame prediction by Chad Johnson (seven catches, 74 yards) of a Bengals win. Jon Kitna’s 77-yard strike to Peter Warrick effectively ended the 24–19 Bengals upset despite a late Trent Green score.

==== Week 12: vs. Oakland Raiders ====
Week 12: Oakland Raiders at Kansas City Chiefs – Game summary

Quarter	1	2	3	4	Total
Raiders	0	7	7	10	**24**
**Chiefs**	14	7	3	3	**27**

at Arrowhead Stadium, Kansas City, Missouri

- Date: November 23
- Game time: 3:15 p.m. CST
- Game weather: Overcast, 30 °F (−1 °C)
- Game attendance: 78,889
- Referee: Larry Nemmers
- TV announcers (CBS): Greg Gumbel, Phil Simms and Armen Keteyian
- Recap, Game Book

Game information

**First quarter**

- KC – Derrick Blaylock 25-yard run (Morten Andersen kick), 9:05. Chiefs 7–0. **Drive: 5 plays, 84 yards, 2:47.**
- KC – Priest Holmes 2-yard run (Morten Andersen kick), 0:28. Chiefs 14–0. **Drive: 6 plays, 68 yards, 2:47.**

**Second quarter**

- OAK – Rick Mirer 13-yard run (Sebastian Janikowski kick), 1:50. Chiefs 14–7. **Drive: 9 plays, 65 yards, 3:31.**
- KC – Jason Dunn 2-yard pass from Trent Green (Morten Andersen kick), 0:22. Chiefs 21–7. **Drive: 8 plays, 69 yards, 1:28.**

**Third quarter**

- OAK – Tyrone Wheatley 15-yard run (Sebastian Janikowski kick), 10:19. Chiefs 21–14. **Drive: 9 plays, 70 yards, 4:41.**
- KC – Morten Andersen 43-yard field goal, 7:12. Chiefs 24–14. **Drive: 5 plays, 23 yards, 3:07.**

**Fourth quarter**

- OAK – Jerry Rice 47-yard pass from Rick Mirer (Sebastian Janikowski kick), 14:26. Chiefs 24–21. **Drive: 6 plays, 77 yards, 2:31.**
- OAK – Sebastian Janikowski 41-yard field goal, 2:18. Tied 24–24. **Drive: 7 plays, 18 yards, 1:33.**
- KC – Morten Andersen 35-yard field goal, 0:04. Chiefs 27–24. **Drive: 8 plays, 38 yards, 2:14.**

**Top passers**

- OAK – Rick Mirer – 19/31, 219 yards, TD
- KC – Trent Green – 23/33, 244 yards, TD

**Top rushers**

- OAK – Tyrone Wheatley – 19 rushes, 77 yards, TD
- KC – Priest Holmes – 21 rushes, 91 yards, TD

**Top receivers**

- OAK – Jerry Porter – 7 receptions, 89 yards
- KC – Priest Holmes – 6 receptions, 100 yards

The 3–7 Raiders refused to go quietly as they erased a 21–7 Chiefs lead. Jerry Rice scored for the first time all season but the Chiefs broke a 24–24 tie on Morten Anderson’s field goal with four seconds left.

==== Week 13: at San Diego Chargers ====
Week 13: Kansas City Chiefs at San Diego Chargers – Game summary

Quarter	1	2	3	4	Total
**Chiefs**	7	14	0	7	**28**
Chargers	0	7	10	7	**24**

at Qualcomm Stadium, San Diego, California

- Date: November 30
- Game time: 3:15 p.m. CST/1:15 p.m. PST
- Game weather: Clear and sunny, 71 °F (22 °C)
- Game attendance: 57,671
- Referee: Mike Carey
- TV announcers (CBS): Dick Enberg, Dan Dierdorf and Bonnie Bernstein
- Recap, Game Book

Game information

**First quarter**

- KC – Priest Holmes 7-yard run (Morten Andersen kick), 5:09. Chiefs 7–0. **Drive: 10 plays, 56 yards, 5:20.**

**Second quarter**

- KC – Priest Holmes 2-yard run (Morten Andersen kick), 12:41. Chiefs 14–0. **Drive: 12 plays, 70 yards, 5:49.**
- SD – LaDainian Tomlinson 6-yard run (Steve Christie kick), 6:23. Chiefs 14–7. **Drive: 8 plays, 52 yards, 4:54.**
- KC – Tony Gonzalez 7-yard pass from Trent Green (Morten Andersen kick), 1:54. Chiefs 21–7. **Drive: 7 plays, 60 yards, 2:59.**

**Third quarter**

- SD – Steve Christie 21-yard field goal, 8:59. Chiefs 21–10. **Drive: 11 plays, 53 yards, 6:01.**
- SD – David Boston 20-yard pass from Doug Flutie (Steve Christie kick), 2:56. Chiefs 21–17. **Drive: 5 plays, 77 yards, 2:07.**

**Fourth quarter**

- KC – Tony Gonzalez 3-yard pass from Trent Green (Morten Andersen kick), 6:28. Chiefs 28–17. **Drive: 8 plays, 27 yards, 4:50.**
- SD – Antonio Gates 18-yard pass from Doug Flutie (Steve Christie kick), 0:00. Chiefs 28–24. **Drive: 8 plays, 84 yards, 1:08.**

**Top passers**

- KC – Trent Green – 17/30, 155 yards, 2 TD, 2 INT
- SD – Doug Flutie – 16/34, 213 yards, 2 TD, 2 INT

**Top rushers**

- KC – Priest Holmes – 31 rushes, 162 yards, 2 TD
- SD – LaDainian Tomlinson – 19 rushes, 106 yards, TD

**Top receivers**

- KC – Tony Gonzalez – 4 receptions, 28 yards, 2 TD
- SD – David Boston – 5 receptions, 85 yards, TD

The Chiefs reached eleven wins leading wire to wire at Qualcomm Stadium despite two Trent Green interceptions to go with two Green touchdowns. Priest Holmes exploded to 162 rushing yards and two scores.

==== Week 14: at Denver Broncos ====
Week 14: Kansas City Chiefs at Denver Broncos – Game summary

Quarter	1	2	3	4	Total
Chiefs	7	14	0	6	**27**
**Broncos**	7	10	14	14	**45**

at Invesco Field at Mile High, Denver, Colorado

- Date: December 7
- Game time: 3:15 p.m. CST/2:15 p.m. MST
- Game weather: Partly cloudy, 63 °F (17 °C)
- Game attendance: 76,403
- Referee: Tony Corrente
- TV announcers (CBS): Greg Gumbel, Phil Simms and Armen Keteyian
- Recap, Game Book

Game information

**First quarter**

- DEN – Clinton Portis 11-yard run (Jason Elam kick), 9:24. Broncos 7–0. **Drive: 10 plays, 74 yards, 5:36.**
- KC – Priest Holmes 2-yard run (Morten Andersen kick), 3:03. Tied 7–7. **Drive: 13 plays, 66 yards, 6:21.**

**Second quarter**

- DEN – Clinton Portis 1-yard run (Jason Elam kick), 11:18. Broncos 14–7. **Drive: 11 plays, 69 yards, 6:45.**
- KC – Priest Holmes 1-yard run (Morten Andersen kick), 7:36. Tied 14–14. **Drive: 7 plays, 36 yards, 3:42.**
- DEN – Jason Elam 47-yard field goal, 5:28. Broncos 17–14. **Drive: 6 plays, 42 yards, 2:08.**
- KC – Eddie Kennison 42-yard pass from Trent Green (Morten Andersen kick), 1:19. Chiefs 21–17. **Drive: 11 plays, 86 yards, 4:09.**

**Third quarter**

- DEN – Reuben Droughns 3-yard pass from Jake Plummer (Jason Elam kick), 5:58. Broncos 24–21. **Drive: 12 plays, 78 yards, 7:27.**
- DEN – Clinton Portis 59-yard run (Jason Elam kick), 2:42. Broncos 31–21. **Drive: 4 plays, 79 yards, 1:20.**

**Fourth quarter**

- DEN – Clinton Portis 28-yard run (Jason Elam kick), 11:24. Broncos 38–21. **Drive: 8 plays, 74 yards, 4:02.**
- DEN – Clinton Portis 53-yard run (Jason Elam kick), 7:58. Broncos 45–21. **Drive: 1 play, 53 yards, 0:10.**
- KC – Trent Green 1-yard run (run failed), 0:02. Broncos 45–27. **Drive: 8 plays, 75 yards, 2:13.**

**Top passers**

- KC – Trent Green – 34/47, 397 yards, TD
- DEN – Jake Plummer – 20/29, 238 yards, TD

**Top rushers**

- KC – Priest Holmes – 12 rushes, 44 yards, 2 TD
- DEN – Clinton Portis – 22 rushes, 218 yards, 5 TD

**Top receivers**

- KC – Dante Hall – 11 receptions, 124 yards
- DEN – Rod Smith – 7 receptions, 85 yards

The Chiefs suffered their second loss of the season 45–27. The game lead tied or changed six times in the first three quarters but after taking a 24–21 lead the Broncos added 21 more points. Clinton Portis ran in five touchdowns for Denver.

==== Week 15: vs. Detroit Lions ====
Week 15: Detroit Lions at Kansas City Chiefs – Game summary

Quarter	1	2	3	4	Total
Lions	0	10	7	0	**17**
**Chiefs**	14	14	17	0	**45**

at Arrowhead Stadium, Kansas City, Missouri

- Date: December 14
- Game time: 12:00 p.m. CST
- Game weather: Cloudy, 29 °F (−2 °C)
- Game attendance: 77,922
- Referee: Bill Leavy
- TV announcers (Fox): Dan Miller and J. C. Pearson
- Recap, Game Book

Game information

**First quarter**

- KC – Tony Gonzalez 27-yard pass from Trent Green (Morten Andersen kick), 6:54. Chiefs 7–0. **Drive: 10 plays, 80 yards, 4:27.**
- KC – Priest Holmes 14-yard run (Morten Andersen kick), 2:41. Chiefs 14–0. **Drive: 4 plays, 50 yards, 2:14.**

**Second quarter**

- KC – Priest Holmes 9-yard run (Morten Andersen kick), 12:08. Chiefs 21–0. **Drive: 9 plays, 65 yards, 4:34.**
- DET – Jason Hanson 29-yard field goal, 3:35. Chiefs 21–3. **Drive: 15 plays, 71 yards, 8:33.**
- KC – Derrick Blaylock 63-yard pass from Trent Green (Morten Andersen kick), 2:11. Chiefs 28–3. **Drive: 3 plays, 70 yards, 1:24.**
- DET – Az-Zahir Hakim 8-yard pass from Joey Harrington (Jason Hanson kick), 0:18. Chiefs 28–10. **Drive: 11 plays, 57 yards, 1:53.**

**Third quarter**

- KC – Priest Holmes 3-yard run (Morten Andersen kick), 10:30. Chiefs 35–10. **Drive: 9 plays, 46 yards, 4:30.**
- KC – Morten Andersen 35-yard field goal, 6:56. Chiefs 38–10. **Drive: 7 plays, 36 yards, 3:26.**
- DET – Shawn Bryson 1-yard run (Jason Hanson kick), 3:54. Chiefs 38–17. **Drive: 6 plays, 53 yards, 3:02.**
- KC – Tony Gonzalez 9-yard pass from Trent Green (Morten Andersen kick), 1:02. Chiefs 45–17. **Drive: 6 plays, 77 yards, 2:52.**

**Fourth quarter**

- No scoring plays.

**Top passers**

- DET – Joey Harrington – 20/36, 197 yards, TD, INT
- KC – Trent Green – 20/25, 341 yards, 3 TD

**Top rushers**

- DET – Shawn Bryson – 18 rushes, 105 yards, TD
- KC – Priest Holmes – 18 rushes, 94 yards, 3 TD

**Top receivers**

- DET – Az-Zahir Hakim – 6 receptions, 72 yards, TD
- KC – Tony Gonzalez – 6 receptions, 93 yards, 2 TD

The 4–9 Lions were crushed 45–17 as Trent Green threw for 341 yards and three touchdowns while Priest Holmes added three scores of his own. It was Steve Mariucci’s only career loss to the Chiefs. Detroit did not return to Kansas City until the 2023 NFL season opener where the Lions beat the Chiefs 21-20.

==== Week 16: at Minnesota Vikings ====
Week 16: Kansas City Chiefs at Minnesota Vikings – Game summary

Quarter	1	2	3	4	Total
Chiefs	0	0	7	13	**20**
**Vikings**	7	17	7	14	**45**

at Hubert H. Humphrey Metrodome, Minneapolis, Minnesota

- Date: December 20
- Game time: 4:00 p.m. CST
- Game weather: None (indoor stadium)
- Game attendance: 64,291
- Referee: Ron Blum
- TV announcers (CBS): Greg Gumbel, Phil Simms and Armen Keteyian
- Recap, Game Book

Game information

**First quarter**

- MIN – Randy Moss 30-yard pass from Daunte Culpepper (Aaron Elling kick), 10:23. Vikings 7–0. **Drive: 8 plays, 92 yards, 4:37.**

**Second quarter**

- MIN – Randy Moss 21-yard pass from Daunte Culpepper (Aaron Elling kick), 10:58. Vikings 14–0. **Drive: 7 plays, 63 yards, 3:27.**
- MIN – Jim Kleinsasser 4-yard pass from Daunte Culpepper (Aaron Elling kick), 3:42. Vikings 21–0. **Drive: 10 plays, 82 yards, 5:44.**
- MIN – Aaron Elling 46-yard field goal, 0:00. Vikings 24–0. **Drive: 8 plays, 41 yards, 2:53.**

**Third quarter**

- MIN – Onterrio Smith 1-yard run (Aaron Elling kick), 11:44. Vikings 31–0. **Drive: 6 plays, 60 yards, 2:07.**
- KC – Priest Holmes 2-yard run (Morten Andersen kick), 5:16. Vikings 31–7. **Drive: 14 plays, 75 yards, 6:28.**

**Fourth quarter**

- KC – Priest Holmes 4-yard run (pass failed), 13:33. Vikings 31–13. **Drive: 8 plays, 79 yards, 2:43.**
- KC – Priest Holmes 1-yard run (Morten Andersen kick), 10:05. Vikings 31–20. **Drive: 3 plays, 9 yards, 1:07.**
- MIN – Onterrio Smith 11-yard run (Aaron Elling kick), 7:00. Vikings 38–20. **Drive: 5 plays, 45 yards, 3:05.**
- MIN – Onterrio Smith 10-yard run (Aaron Elling kick), 6:00. Vikings 45–20. **Drive: 3 plays, 17 yards, 0:46.**

**Top passers**

- KC – Trent Green – 18/38, 224 yards, 2 INT
- MIN – Daunte Culpepper – 20/29, 260 yards, 3 TD, INT

**Top rushers**

- KC – Priest Holmes – 18 rushes, 55 yards, 3 TD
- MIN – Onterrio Smith – 21 rushes, 146 yards, 3 TD

**Top receivers**

- KC – Eddie Kennison – 5 receptions, 89 yards
- MIN – Randy Moss – 7 receptions, 111 yards, 2 TD

Having clinched the AFC West the Chiefs were vying for a playoff bye. The top conference seed slipped away in this Saturday game as the Vikings forced four Chiefs turnovers, raced to a 31–0 lead, and didn't look back despite a three-touchdown barrage by 10:05 to go in the fourth. Despite the 45-20 loss, the Chiefs gained on a playoff bye on Denver's win over the Colts the next day.

==== Week 17: vs. Chicago Bears ====
Week 17: Chicago Bears at Kansas City Chiefs – Game summary

Quarter	1	2	3	4	Total
Bears	0	0	3	0	**3**
**Chiefs**	0	14	7	10	**31**

at Arrowhead Stadium, Kansas City, Missouri

- Date: December 28
- Game time: 12:00 p.m. CST
- Game weather: Clear, 46 °F (8 °C)
- Game attendance: 78,413
- Referee: Pete Morelli
- TV announcers (Fox): Sam Rosen and Bill Maas
- Recap, Game Book

Game information

**First quarter**

- No scoring plays.

**Second quarter**

- KC – Priest Holmes 1-yard run (Morten Andersen kick), 13:40. Chiefs 7–0. **Drive: 11 plays, 51 yards, 5:27.**
- KC – Eddie Kennison 6-yard pass from Trent Green (Morten Andersen kick), 7:07. Chiefs 14–0. **Drive: 8 plays, 58 yards, 4:19.**

**Third quarter**

- CHI – Paul Edinger 48-yard field goal, 9:24. Chiefs 14–3. **Drive: 11 plays, 52 yards, 5:36.**
- KC – Priest Holmes 2-yard run (Morten Andersen kick), 0:58. Chiefs 21–3. **Drive: 5 plays, 28 yards, 2:15.**

**Fourth quarter**

- KC – Morten Andersen 38-yard field goal, 10:03. Chiefs 24–3. **Drive: 8 plays, 73 yards, 3:17.**
- KC – Larry Johnson 5-yard run (Morten Andersen kick), 3:40. Chiefs 31–3. **Drive: 9 plays, 67 yards, 4:54.**

**Top passers**

- CHI – Kordell Stewart – 5/15, 86 yards, 2 INT
- KC – Trent Green – 19/27, 162 yards, TD, INT

**Top rushers**

- CHI – Anthony Thomas – 16 rushes, 61 yards
- KC – Priest Holmes – 20 rushes, 50 yards, 2 TD

**Top receivers**

- CHI – Marty Booker – 6 receptions, 92 yards
- KC – Johnnie Morton – 6 receptions, 81 yards

With New England's shutout win over the Bills the previous day, the Chiefs could only secure a playoff bye as the second conference seed. They did so 31–3 on three rushing scores while the 7-9 Bears used three quarterbacks who combined for two interceptions. The Chiefs would not go undefeated at home again until 2024.

=== Standings ===
AFC West
	W	L	T	PCT	DIV	CONF	PF	PA	STK
^{(2)} Kansas City Chiefs	13	3	0	.813	5–1	10–2	484	332	W1
^{(6)} Denver Broncos	10	6	0	.625	5–1	9–3	381	301	L1
Oakland Raiders	4	12	0	.250	1–5	3–9	270	379	L2
San Diego Chargers	4	12	0	.250	1–5	2–10	313	441	W1

== Postseason ==
=== Schedule ===
Round	Date	Opponent (seed)	Result	Record	Venue	Recap
Wild Card	First-round bye					
Divisional	January 11	Indianapolis Colts (3)	L 31–38	0–1	Arrowhead Stadium	Recap

=== Game summaries ===
==== AFC Divisional Playoffs: vs. (3) Indianapolis Colts ====
AFC Divisional Playoffs: (3) Indianapolis Colts at (2) Kansas City Chiefs – Game summary

Quarter	1	2	3	4	Total
Colts	14	7	10	7	38
Chiefs	3	7	14	7	31

at Arrowhead Stadium, Kansas City, Missouri

- Date: January 11, 2004
- Game time: 12:00 p.m. CDT
- Game weather: Clear, 51 °F (11 °C)
- Game attendance: 79,159
- Referee: Gerald Austin
- TV announcers (CBS): Dick Enberg, Dan Dierdorf and Bonnie Bernstein
- Recap, Game Book

Game information

First quarter

- IND – Brandon Stokley 29-yard pass from Peyton Manning (Mike Vanderjagt kick), 9:20. Colts 7–0. Drive: 10 plays, 70 yards, 5:40.
- KC – Morten Andersen 22-yard field goal, 3:38. Colts 7–3. Drive: 11 plays, 73 yards, 5:42.
- IND – Edgerrin James 11-yard run (Mike Vanderjagt kick), 0:37. Colts 14–3. Drive: 6 plays, 76 yards, 3:01.

Second quarter

- KC – Dante Hall 9-yard pass from Trent Green (Morten Andersen kick), 8:35. Colts 14–10. Drive: 12 plays, 77 yards, 7:02.
- IND – Tom Lopienski 2-yard pass from Peyton Manning (Mike Vanderjagt kick), 4:29. Colts 21–10. Drive: 9 plays, 71 yards, 4:06.

Third quarter

- IND – Mike Vanderjagt 45-yard field goal, 9:24. Colts 24–10. Drive: 11 plays, 51 yards, 5:08.
- KC – Priest Holmes 1-yard run (Morten Andersen kick), 5:26. Colts 24–17. Drive: 8 plays, 55 yards, 3:58.
- IND – Reggie Wayne 19-yard pass from Peyton Manning (Mike Vanderjagt kick), 1:48. Colts 31–17. Drive: 7 plays, 64 yards, 3:38.
- KC – Dante Hall 92-yard kickoff return (Morten Andersen kick), 1:35. Colts 31–24. Drive: 0 plays, 0 yards, 0:13.

Fourth quarter

- IND – Edgerrin James 1-yard run (Mike Vanderjagt kick), 11:14. Colts 38–24. Drive: 10 plays, 81 yards, 5:21.
- KC – Priest Holmes 1-yard run (Morten Andersen kick), 4:22. Colts 38–31. Drive: 17 plays, 76 yards, 6:52.

Top passers

- IND – Peyton Manning – 22/30, 304 yards, 3 TD
- KC – Trent Green – 18/30, 212 yards, TD

Top rushers

- IND – Edgerrin James – 26 rushes, 125 yards, 2 TD
- KC – Priest Holmes – 24 rushes, 176 yards, 2 TD

Top receivers

- IND – Marvin Harrison – 6 receptions, 98 yards
- KC – Tony Gonzalez – 4 receptions, 55 yards

This offensive shootout became the second game without a punt in NFL playoff history, and first since the Buffalo Bills played the San Francisco 49ers in 1992. Colts quarterback Peyton Manning threw for 304 yards and three touchdowns, while Edgerrin James ran for a career postseason high 125 yards and two scores. On the Kansas City side, Dante Hall caught a touchdown and returned a kickoff for another; and Priest Holmes, who set the regular-season rushing touchdown record, rushed for 176 yards, caught 5 passes for 32 yards, and scored twice. Kansas City quarterback Trent Green threw for 212 yards and a touchdown while also rushing for 18 yards in his first career postseason game. The Chiefs defense failed to stop the Colt's offense. Kansas City's defensive coordinator Greg Robinson was asked to resign the following week. Chiefs lost and in 2004 missed the playoffs 7–9.

== See also ==
- 2003 Kansas City Chiefs on Database Football
