= Trent Green =

American football player (born 1970)

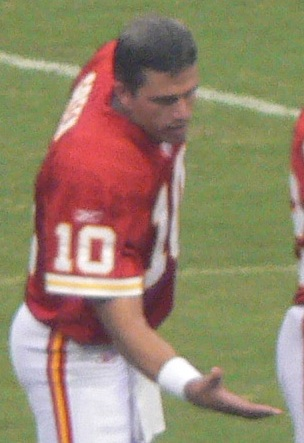
- Green with the Kansas City Chiefs in 2006

No. 7, 10, 12
- Position: Quarterback

Personal information
- Born: July 9, 1970 (age 56); Cedar Rapids, Iowa, U.S.
- Listed height: 6 ft 3 in (1.91 m)
- Listed weight: 208 lb (94 kg)

Career information
- High school: Vianney (Kirkwood, Missouri)
- College: Indiana (1988–1992)
- NFL draft: 1993: 8th round, 222nd overall pick

Career history
- San Diego Chargers (1993); BC Lions (1994); Washington Redskins (1995–1998); St. Louis Rams (1999–2000); Kansas City Chiefs (2001–2006); Miami Dolphins (2007); St. Louis Rams (2008)

Awards and highlights
- Super Bowl champion (XXXIV); 2× Pro Bowl (2003, 2005); NFL record: Longest touchdown pass: 99 yards (tied)

Career NFL statistics
- Passing attempts: 3,740
- Passing completions: 2,266
- Completion percentage: 60.6%
- TD–INT: 162–114
- Passing yards: 28,475
- Passer rating: 86
- Stats at Pro Football Reference

Trent Jason Green (born July 9, 1970) is an American former professional football quarterback who played in the National Football League (NFL) for 15 seasons. He was a member of five teams during his career, most notably the Kansas City Chiefs.

Green played college football for the Indiana Hoosiers and was selected by the San Diego Chargers in the eighth round of the 1993 NFL draft. He did not see any significant playing time until his fifth season in 1998 with the Washington Redskins when he became the team's starter. The following year, Green joined the St. Louis Rams to become their starter, but after suffering a season-ending injury during the preseason, he was replaced by Kurt Warner, leading to the team winning Super Bowl XXXIV. He spent one more season in St. Louis as Warner's backup before joining the Chiefs.

During his six seasons as Kansas City's starter, Green led the team to one division title and two playoff appearances while earning two Pro Bowl selections. Green held his last starting position with the Miami Dolphins and returned to the Rams for his final season.

== Early life ==
Green grew up in St. Louis, Missouri, and attended St. John Vianney High School in Kirkwood, Missouri, a suburb of St. Louis.

== College career ==
Green played college football for the Indiana University Hoosiers. During Green's four-year career he threw for 5,400 yards with 23 touchdowns and 31 interceptions. He also ran for 15 touchdowns, 11 of which were scored in his junior season. He graduated with a degree in business.

== Professional career ==
Pre-draft measurables
| Height | Weight | Arm length | Hand span | 40-yard dash | 10-yard split | 20-yard split | 20-yard shuttle | Vertical jump |
|---|---|---|---|---|---|---|---|---|
| 6 ft 2 1/2 in (1.89 m) | 211 lb (96 kg) | 33 1/8 in (0.84 m) | 9 5/8 in (0.24 m) | 4.92 s | 1.68 s | 2.82 s | 4.20 s | 32.5 in (0.83 m) |
All values from NFL Combine

=== San Diego Chargers, BC Lions, Washington Redskins ===
In 1993, Green was selected as the twenty-sixth pick in the eighth round and 222nd overall by the San Diego Chargers. He spent a year as a backup and saw no playing time. After being cut in 1994 by the British Columbia Lions of the CFL, he joined the Washington Redskins. Outside of one pass thrown in 1997, he would not see NFL action until 1998, when he threw for 3,441 yards, 23 touchdowns, and 11 interceptions.

Green's breakout season came just in time, as he became an unrestricted free agent after the 1998 season. He rejected a four-year, $12 million offer from the Redskins.

=== St. Louis Rams (first stint) ===
On February 15, 1999, Green agreed to a four-year, $17.5 million contract with the St. Louis Rams which included a $4.5 million signing bonus. In 1999, Green was slated to be the starter for the Rams, but suffered a season-ending knee injury in a preseason game on a hit by Rodney Harrison of the Chargers. Kurt Warner took over for Green, and led the Rams to a 13–3 season, culminating in a 23–16 victory over the Tennessee Titans in Super Bowl XXXIV and Warner being named NFL MVP.

Warner's success relegated Green to the backup position for the 2000 season. He started five games in the middle of the season while Warner was out with a broken hand. Green and Warner combined to lead the Rams to the then-highest team passing yards total in NFL history that season.

=== Kansas City Chiefs ===
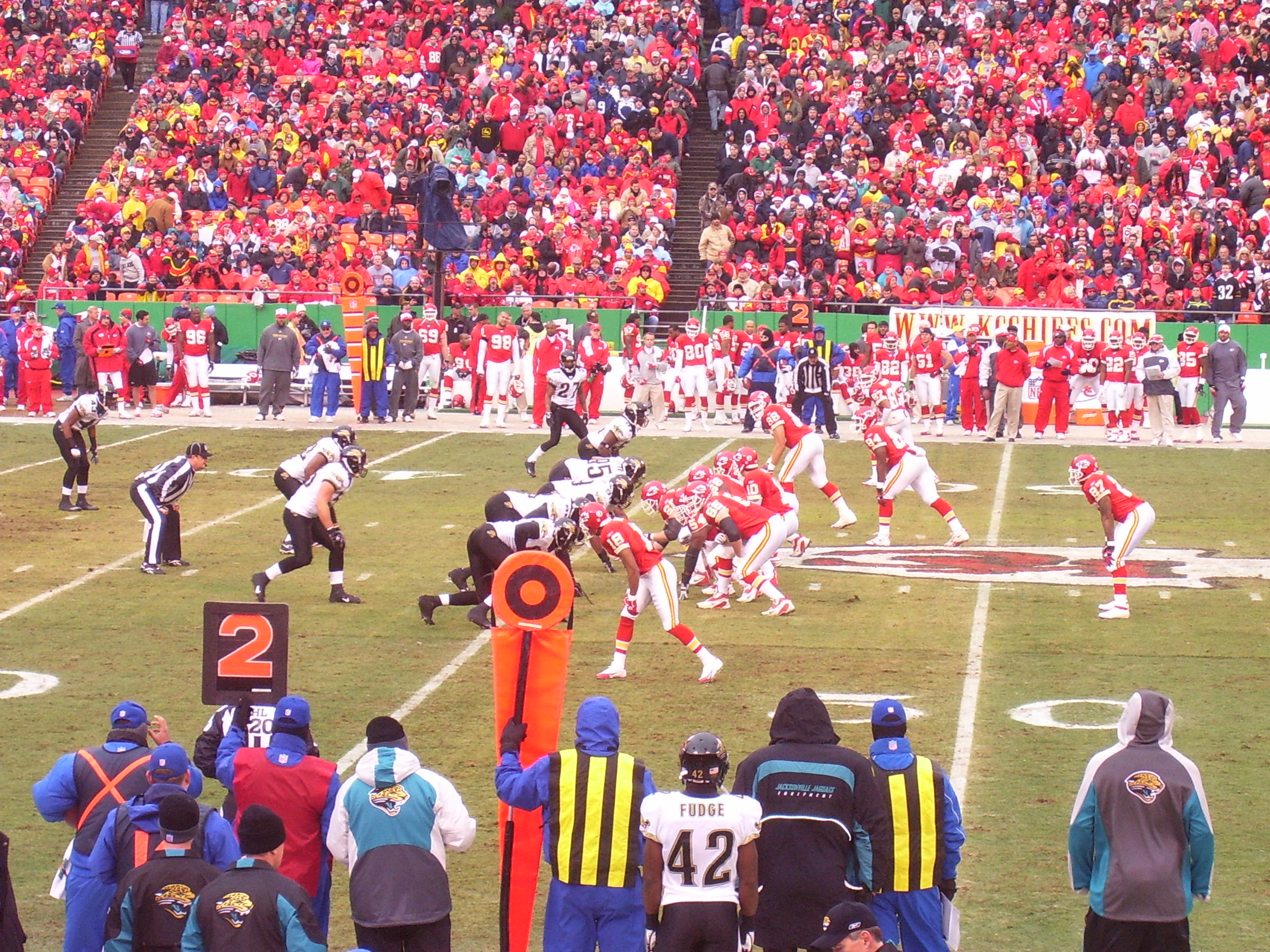
Green lines up with the Chiefs' offense, 2006.

Green was traded in 2001 to the Kansas City Chiefs for the 12th overall pick in the 2001 NFL draft. Dick Vermeil, recently hired by the Chiefs, made trading for Green and signing Priest Holmes top priorities, as he envisioned them joining Tony Gonzalez, Dante Hall, and Will Shields to form a powerful offense.

During his first season in Kansas City, Green struggled. He threw for 3,783 yards and 17 touchdowns, but also threw 24 interceptions. Green displayed marked improvement in 2002, throwing 26 touchdowns to only 13 interceptions as the Chiefs went 8–8. Green tied the record for the longest career pass play in NFL history (99 yards) on December 22, 2002, on a pass to Marc Boerigter in a game against the San Diego Chargers. In 2003, Green had his breakout year, throwing for 4,039 yards, 24 touchdowns, and 12 interceptions. He led the Chiefs to a 13–3 record and a first-round bye in the playoffs. However, in the divisional playoff game, they lost a 38–31 shootout to Peyton Manning and the Indianapolis Colts. The game was notable for there being no punts by either team, a first in NFL playoff history. Green was selected to his first Pro Bowl that year.

In 2004, the Chiefs went 7–9 as Priest Holmes suffered a season ending injury. At the time, Holmes was leading the league in both rushing and scoring. However, Green still had a stellar year, passing for 4,591 yards, 27 touchdowns, and 17 interceptions. His passing total for 2004 was second only to Minnesota's Daunte Culpepper. Green has the distinction of having four consecutive seasons with a QB rating of 90.0 or better, three of those with over 4,000 passing yards. Green started 80 consecutive games during his first five years with the Chiefs, a team record.

Green had another strong season in 2005, throwing for 4,010 yards (second only to New England's Tom Brady), and throwing just 10 interceptions, his lowest season total ever, earning another Pro Bowl selection. In week 17, the Chiefs needed a Pittsburgh Steelers loss, and a victory against the Cincinnati Bengals to reach the playoffs. The Chiefs defeated the Bengals 38-3, however the Steelers won and secured the final playoff spot, leaving the Chiefs out of the postseason at 10-6 (The Steelers would go on a run as the sixth seed to win the Super Bowl). This would also mark longtime coach Dick Vermeil's final game Green's 2006 season was put in jeopardy by a severe concussion he suffered during the first game of the season on September 10, 2006, against the Cincinnati Bengals in Kansas City. Green attempted to slide during a third-quarter play, but was hit hard by Cincinnati defensive end Robert Geathers, who had lowered his shoulders, but instead struck the quarterback in an unusual position. However, the official determined that no foul had been committed and Geathers insisted that he had tried to check up, but was pushed by Chiefs receiver Eddie Kennison. CBS announcer Randy Cross, a former offensive lineman with the San Francisco 49ers, believed the hit was unintentional and supported the officials' decision. National Football League officials took the same position and, on September 13, 2006, declined to fine Robert Geathers because he did not have complete control of his body. Green was rendered unconscious and the game was delayed for over fifteen minutes while he received medical attention. He reportedly regained consciousness in the tunnel and could not recall the play. According to Chiefs general manager Carl Peterson, preliminary doctor's visits revealed a "very, very severe concussion" and stated that Green would be out indefinitely.

On Saturday, October 21, 2006, it was reported that Green was cleared by doctors to return to practice. Chiefs president and general manager Carl Peterson said that this did not mean that he was cleared to play. Peterson confirmed that Green's return to practice would be in a controlled environment to see how far along he is in his recovery from a "very, very severe concussion." On November 15, 2006, Kansas City Chiefs head coach, Herman Edwards announced that Green would take back his starting quarterback job from Damon Huard who took over when Green suffered a concussion.

Green helped Kansas City return to the playoffs, however they lost against Peyton Manning and the Indianapolis Colts in the Wild-Card round.

On February 27, 2007, Damon Huard was re-signed by the Chiefs for $7.5 million over three years, causing a "quarterback controversy" in Kansas City. Green initially was asked to take a pay cut in his 2007 salary, and had been granted permission to seek a trade to another team. Teams interested in Green prior to the 2007 NFL draft included the Miami Dolphins (who offered a seventh-round draft pick to the Chiefs, but the Chiefs declined, instead seeking a fifth-round pick), the Detroit Lions, and Cleveland Browns. Green was not traded on draft weekend as previously expected. Green said he would not return to Kansas City, therefore making his release possible. Green had told the Chiefs that Miami was his preference being that he previously worked under both head coach Cam Cameron and quarterbacks coach Terry Shea.

=== Miami Dolphins ===
On June 5, 2007, the Chiefs agreed to trade Green to the Miami Dolphins for a conditional fifth-round pick in the 2008 NFL draft, pending a physical from Green which was subsequently passed. Green was introduced at a news conference in Miami on June 6. The draft pick would have become a fourth-round pick if Green played more than 70 percent of Miami's offensive plays. On August 20 the Dolphins named Green the starter with Cleo Lemon named as his backup, despite the fact that neither of them had thrown a touchdown pass to that point in pre-season play. Second-round pick John Beck was named third string.

Green's position with his new team—as well as his career—was instantly put in jeopardy on October 7 as he suffered another severe concussion early in a game against the Texans at Houston. With just under 4 minutes to play in the first quarter, Green put his shoulder low to the knees of 315-pound Houston defensive tackle Travis Johnson in a successful attempt to block him on a play that started with a fumbled handoff to Dolphins rookie wide receiver Ted Ginn Jr. Ginn, who was running right-to-left across the backfield when the exchange was fumbled, recovered the ball near the sidelines and then reversed field. Johnson went down in a sprawling tumble on the block at the same time Green fell face-down to the turf, knocked out cold after striking Johnson's knee with his helmet. Johnson, upon getting up and seeing Ginn had been stopped and the play ended, immediately walked towards Green's body, jabbing his finger at the motionless quarterback. Johnson was flagged with a 15-yard penalty for taunting, and medical personnel quickly made their way to Green. After being examined on the field for nearly five minutes, Green was carted off on a stretcher as Cleo Lemon stepped in to take his place.

After the game an angry Travis Johnson had harsh words for Green, comparing him to "the scarecrow [who] wants to get courage" and calling the block "malicious." Texans head coach Gary Kubiak, while in some ways siding with Johnson in saying that NFL officials should review the rules on "chop" blocks, also called Johnson's reaction over a fallen player "inexcusable."

While many fans and sportswriters alike called for Green to retire, Green was back with the team in practice, albeit in street clothes, the Friday after the injury after returning from Kansas City where he was evaluated by the same medical team that made the diagnosis in 2006. Coach Cam Cameron had initially expressed his plans for Green to return to the game before the end of the 2007 season. However, on October 20, 2007, the Dolphins announced that Green would be placed on injured reserve, and made Cleo Lemon their starting quarterback. Following the season, Green became one of nine players released by the Dolphins on February 11, 2008.

=== St. Louis Rams (second stint) ===
On March 10, 2008, Green agreed to a three-year deal worth about $9 million with the St. Louis Rams, rejoining the team he played for in 1999 and 2000. On September 23, 2008, Green was named the starter for week 4 versus the Buffalo Bills. He completed 17 of 32 passes for 236 yards with one interception and a quarterback rating of 64.1. On November 9, 2008, against the Jets, Green took over for Marc Bulger after Bulger was shut out by the Jets in the first half. The Rams released Green on February 25, 2009.

=== Retirement ===
Green retired from professional football on June 12, 2009, citing a desire to pursue a career in broadcasting. Green's agent, Jim Steiner, said "He had a long, prosperous, very successful career. He believes he can still play, but the demand isn't real high out there right now and he's not the type of guy who is going to sit around for four or five months waiting for the phone to ring."

== NFL career statistics ==
Legend
| | Won the Super Bowl |
| | NFL record |
| | Led the league |
| **Bold** | Career high |

=== Regular season ===
| Year | Team | Games | | | Passing | | | | | | | | | Rushing | | | | | Sacks | | Fumbles | |
| Year | Team | GP | GS | Record | Cmp | Att | Pct | Yds | Avg | Lng | TD | Int | Rtg | Att | Yds | Avg | Lng | TD | Sck | SckY | Fum | Lost |
|---|---|---|---|---|---|---|---|---|---|---|---|---|---|---|---|---|---|---|---|---|---|---|
| 1997 | WAS | 1 | 0 | — | 0 | 1 | 0.0 | 0 | 0.0 | 0 | 0 | 0 | 39.6 | — | — | — | — | — | 0 | 0 | 0 | 0 |
| 1998 | WAS | 15 | 14 | 6–8 | 278 | 509 | 54.6 | 3,441 | 6.8 | 75 | 23 | 11 | 81.8 | **42** | 117 | 2.8 | 13 | **2** | **49** | **338** | **14** | 7 |
| 1999 | STL | 0 | 0 | – | Did not play due to injury | | | | | | | | | | | | | | | | | |
| 2000 | STL | 8 | 5 | 2–3 | 145 | 240 | 60.4 | 2,063 | 8.6 | 64 | 16 | 5 | **101.8** | 20 | 69 | 3.5 | 18 | 1 | 24 | 145 | 3 | 2 |
| 2001 | KC | 16 | 16 | 6–10 | 296 | 523 | 56.6 | 3,783 | 7.2 | 67 | 17 | **24** | 71.1 | 35 | 158 | 4.5 | 16 | 0 | 39 | 198 | 11 | 4 |
| 2002 | KC | 16 | 16 | 8–8 | 287 | 470 | 61.1 | 3,690 | 7.9 | **99** | 26 | 13 | 92.6 | 31 | **225** | **7.3** | **24** | 1 | 26 | 141 | 1 | 0 |
| 2003 | KC | 16 | 16 | 13–3 | 330 | 523 | 63.1 | 4,039 | 7.7 | 67 | 24 | 12 | 92.6 | 26 | 83 | 3.2 | 14 | **2** | 20 | 130 | 5 | 1 |
| 2004 | KC | 16 | 16 | 7–9 | **369** | **556** | **66.4** | **4,591** | **8.3** | 70 | **27** | 17 | 95.2 | 25 | 85 | 3.4 | 13 | 0 | 32 | 227 | 11 | 4 |
| 2005 | KC | 16 | 16 | 10–6 | 317 | 507 | 62.5 | 4,014 | 7.9 | 60 | 17 | 10 | 90.1 | 35 | 82 | 2.3 | 13 | 0 | 32 | 204 | 8 | 4 |
| 2006 | KC | 8 | 8 | 4–4 | 121 | 198 | 61.1 | 1,342 | 6.8 | 39 | 7 | 9 | 74.1 | 19 | 59 | 3.1 | 10 | 0 | 24 | 127 | 5 | 3 |
| 2007 | MIA | 5 | 5 | 0–5 | 85 | 141 | 60.3 | 987 | 7.0 | 43 | 5 | 7 | 72.6 | 7 | 32 | 4.6 | 23 | 0 | 7 | 53 | 2 | 0 |
| 2008 | STL | 3 | 1 | 0–1 | 38 | 72 | 52.8 | 525 | 7.3 | 53 | 0 | 6 | 41.7 | 3 | 4 | 1.3 | 3 | 0 | 6 | 58 | 0 | 0 |
| Career | | 120 | 113 | 56–57 | 2,266 | 3,740 | 60.6 | 28,475 | 7.6 | 99 | 162 | 114 | 86.0 | 243 | 914 | 3.8 | 24 | 6 | 259 | 1,621 | 60 | 25 |

=== Postseason ===
| Year | Team | Games | | | Passing | | | | | | | | | Rushing | | | | | Sacks | | Fumbles | |
| Year | Team | GP | GS | Record | Cmp | Att | Pct | Yds | Avg | Lng | TD | Int | Rtg | Att | Yds | Avg | Lng | TD | Sck | SckY | Fum | Lost |
|---|---|---|---|---|---|---|---|---|---|---|---|---|---|---|---|---|---|---|---|---|---|---|
| 1999 | STL | 0 | 0 | – | Did not play | | | | | | | | | | | | | | | | | |
| 2000 | STL | 0 | 0 | – | Did not play | | | | | | | | | | | | | | | | | |
| 2003 | KC | 1 | 1 | 0–1 | **18** | **30** | **60.0** | **212** | **7.1** | **25** | **1** | 0 | **92.6** | **3** | **18** | **6.0** | **9** | 0 | 0 | 0 | 0 | 0 |
| 2006 | KC | 1 | 1 | 0–1 | 14 | 24 | 58.3 | 107 | 4.5 | 24 | **1** | **2** | 48.4 | 1 | -3 | -3.0 | -3 | 0 | **4** | **25** | **2** | **1** |
| Career | | 2 | 2 | 0–2 | 32 | 54 | 59.3 | 319 | 5.9 | 25 | 2 | 2 | 73.0 | 4 | 15 | 3.8 | 9 | 0 | 4 | 25 | 2 | 1 |

== Post-NFL career ==
In the 2009 NFL season, Green started doing work as a color analyst on regional NFL games for the Fox network for one season, as well as a studio analyst for the NFL Total Access show on the NFL Network. He also worked with Ian Eagle calling Thursday Night Football games on Westwood One radio and with Paul Burmeister on Kansas City Chiefs preseason broadcasts. In April 2014, Green was hired by CBS as an NFL analyst alongside Greg Gumbel, and later with Kevin Harlan. Trent Green sometimes works as a guest analyst for the NFL on Westwood One.

In July 2012, Green was named the forty-first greatest quarterback of the NFL's post-merger era, according to Football Nation.

On November 22, 2016, Green was named the Big Ten's Dungy-Thompson Humanitarian Award winner.

== Personal life ==
Green has two sons and a daughter. One son, Trent Jr. (T.J.), played quarterback for Northwestern. His other son Derek, is a former SMU and Long Island University quarterback that now plays for the Bologna Warriors, a team of the Italian Football League. His son Derek is engaged to Gracie Hunt, daughter of Kansas City Chiefs owner, Clark Hunt.

== See also ==
- Most consecutive starts by a quarterback (NFL)
