= Gary Stills =

American football player (born 1974)

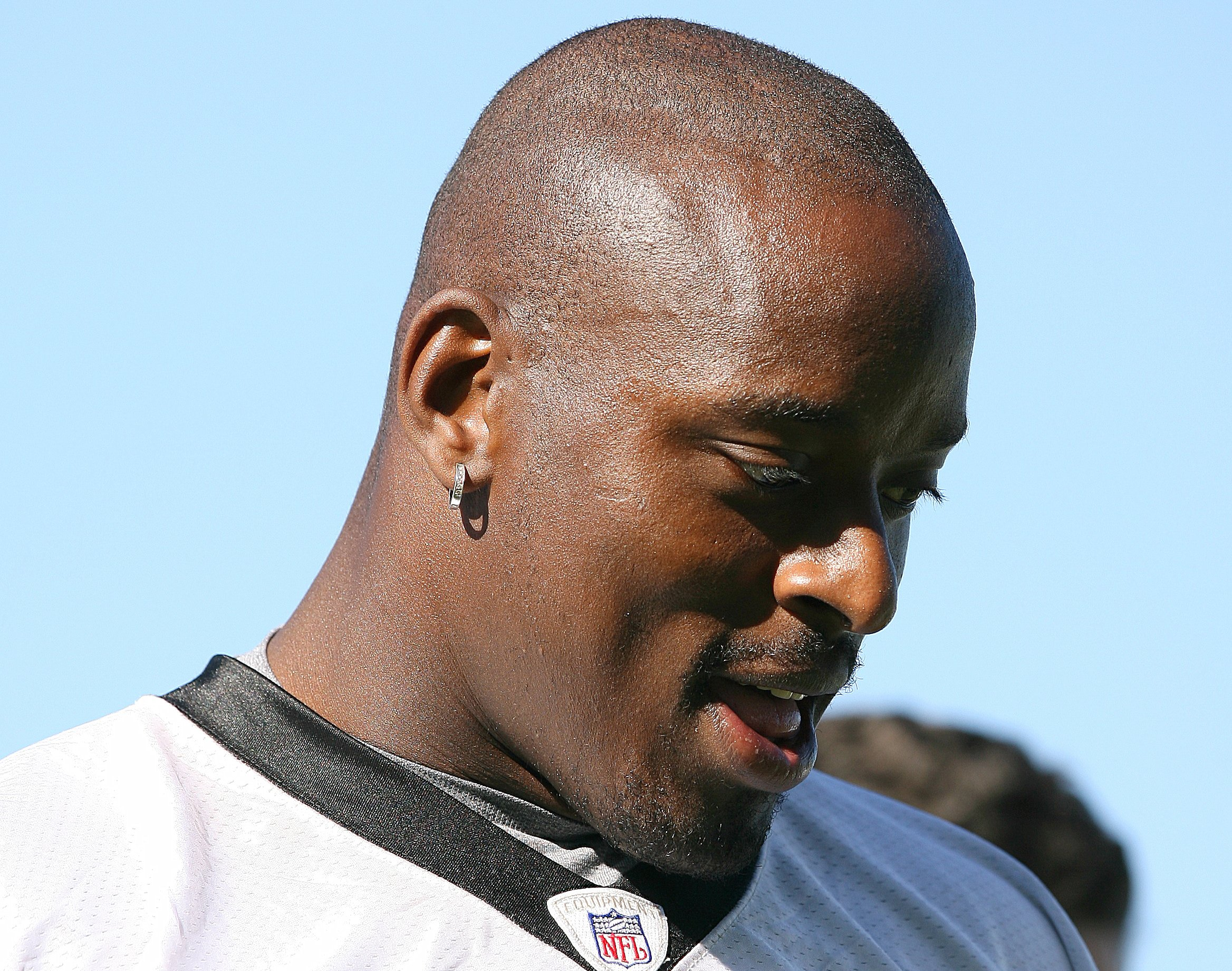
- Stills while with the Baltimore Ravens in 2007

No. 56, 55
- Position: Defensive end

Personal information
- Born: July 11, 1974 (age 52); Trenton, New Jersey, U.S.
- Listed height: 6 ft 2 in (1.88 m)
- Listed weight: 250 lb (113 kg)

Career information
- High school: Valley Forge Military Academy (Wayne, Pennsylvania)
- College: West Virginia
- NFL draft: 1999: 3rd round, 75th overall pick

Career history
- Kansas City Chiefs (1999–2005); Baltimore Ravens (2006–2007); St. Louis Rams (2008); Las Vegas Locomotives (2009); Omaha Nighthawks (2010)

Awards and highlights
- UFL champion (2009); Pro Bowl (2003)

Career NFL statistics
- Total tackles: 206
- Sacks: 8.5
- Forced fumbles: 6
- Fumble recoveries: 11
- Stats at Pro Football Reference

Gary Stills (born July 11, 1974) is an American former professional football player who was a defensive end for 10 seasons in the National Football League (NFL). He played college football for the West Virginia Mountaineers. He was selected by the Kansas City Chiefs in the third round of the 1999 NFL draft, and also played for the Baltimore Ravens, St. Louis Rams and Las Vegas Locomotives.

== Early life ==
Stills attended Valley Forge Military Academy, where as a senior he registered 162 tackles with 7.5 sacks.

== College career ==
Stills played college football at West Virginia University. During his career, he finished with 159 tackles and 26 sacks. He majored in sports management.

His best season was in 1997. As a junior, he finished the year with 12 sacks. In the season opener against Marshall, Stills had a school-record 4 sacks. He finished the year with 67 total tackles while earning all-Big East honors.

== Professional career ==
Pre-draft measurables
Height	Weight	Arm length	Hand span	40-yard dash	10-yard split	20-yard split	20-yard shuttle	Three-cone drill	Vertical jump	Broad jump	Bench press
6 ft 1 3/8 in (1.86 m)	238 lb (108 kg)	32 7/8 in (0.84 m)	10 1/2 in (0.27 m)	4.73 s	1.61 s	2.75 s	4.28 s	7.33 s	31.5 in (0.80 m)	9 ft 8 in (2.95 m)	23 reps
All values from the NFL Combine

=== Kansas City Chiefs ===
Stills was selected by the Kansas City Chiefs in the third round (75th overall) in the 1999 NFL draft. In his rookie year, he only played in two games and was inactive for the other 14. In 2000, he played 11 games on special teams and finished the year with ten tackles. The following year, he posted 15 tackles and also had a period in NFL Europe, playing for the Frankfurt Galaxy. In 2002, he played in all 16 games and finished the campaign with a career high 44 tackles and two sacks. 2003 was another solid year for Stills, who recorded 38 tackles and a career high three sacks. He was selected to his first Pro Bowl. In 2004, he played in 16 games making 30 tackles and 2.5 sacks. In his final year with the Chiefs, he recorded 19 tackles. He was known for his tremendous special teams play, and his famous celebration in which he "punches the ground" after he would tackle a returner. However, the Chiefs later released Stills.

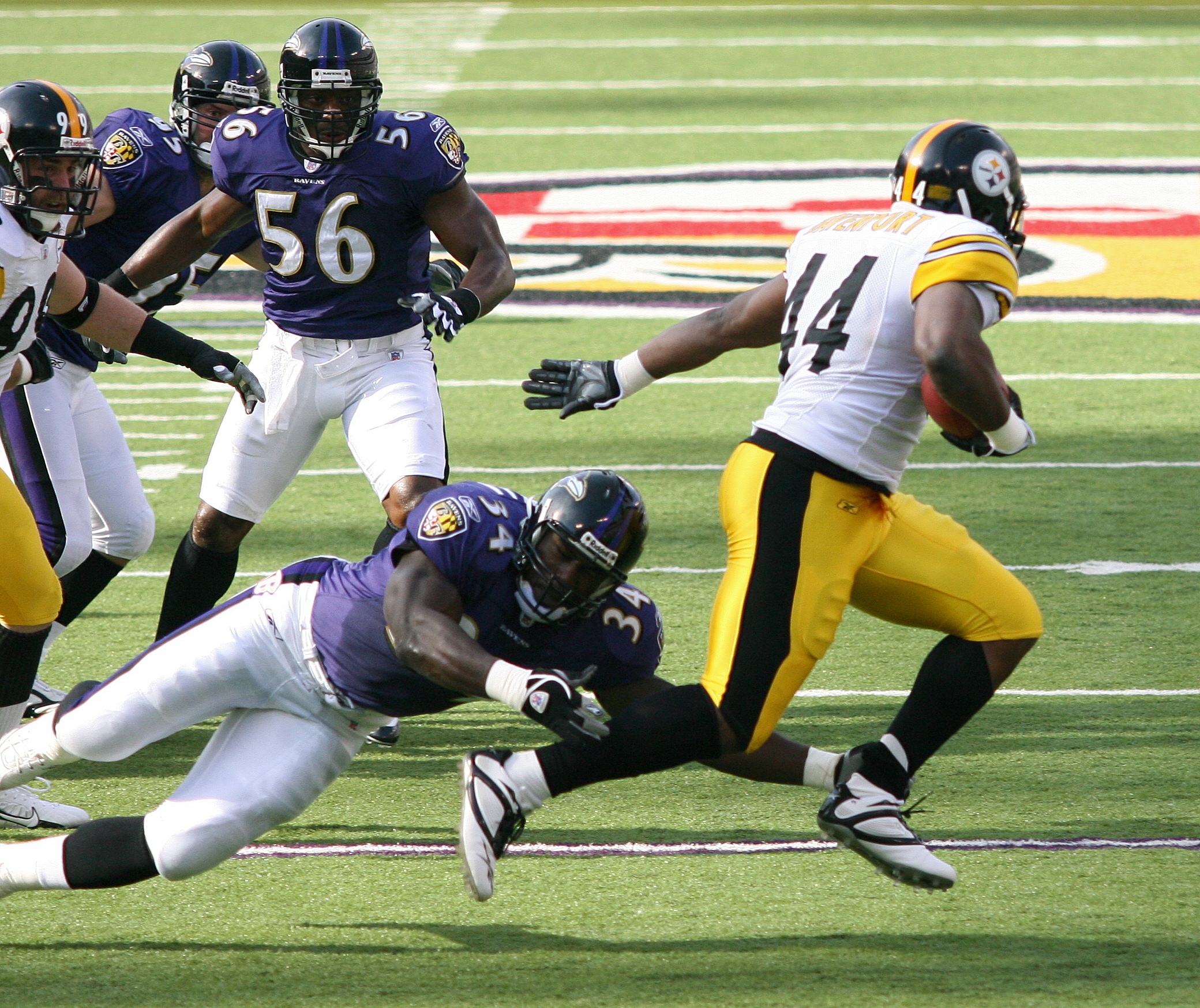
Stills (56) playing against the Pittsburgh Steelers in 2006.

=== Baltimore Ravens ===
Stills signed with the Baltimore Ravens before the 2006 season. In his first year with the franchise, he played in 16 games and recorded a team record 44 special teams tackles. In 2007, he again played in 16 games and finished the season with 15 tackles and one sack. He was released from the Ravens on August 30, 2008, during final cuts.

=== St. Louis Rams ===
Two days after being let go by the Ravens, Stills was signed by the St. Louis Rams on September 1, 2008.

=== Las Vegas Locomotives ===
Stills was drafted by the Las Vegas Locomotives on June 18, 2009.

=== NFL statistics ===
Season	Team	Games	Combined tackles	Tackles	Assisted tackles	Sacks	Forced fumbles	Fumble recoveries
1999	KC	2	0	0	0	0.0	0	0
2000	KC	12	0	0	0	0.0	0	1
2001	KC	10	15	14	1	0.0	0	1
2002	KC	16	43	38	5	2.0	1	1
2003	KC	16	35	35	0	3.0	3	2
2004	KC	16	29	26	3	2.5	0	2
2005	KC	16	19	14	5	0.0	0	1
2006	BAL	16	26	24	2	0.0	1	1
2007	BAL	16	16	16	0	1.0	1	0
2008	STL	14	8	7	1	0.0	0	1
Career		134	191	174	17	8.5	6	10

== Personal life ==
His two sons, Dante and Darius, played football at West Virginia University. Dante is currently a member of the Arizona Cardinals and Darius is a free agent.
