= Jerome Woods =

American football player (born 1973)

No. 21
- Position: Safety

Personal information
- Born: March 17, 1973 (age 53); Memphis, Tennessee, U.S.
- Listed height: 6 ft 3 in (1.91 m)
- Listed weight: 205 lb (93 kg)

Career information
- High school: Melrose (TN)
- College: Northwest Mississippi CC; Memphis
- NFL draft: 1996: 1st round, 28th overall pick

Career history
- Kansas City Chiefs (1996–2005)

Awards and highlights
- Pro Bowl (2003); Second-team All-American (1995)

Career NFL statistics
- Interceptions: 15
- Sacks: 5
- Touchdowns: 2
- Stats at Pro Football Reference

Jerome Harlan Woods (born March 17, 1973) is an American former professional football player who spent his entire 10-year career as a safety for the Kansas City Chiefs of the National Football League (NFL).

With Kansas City, he produced 720 tackles (487 solo), 5.0 sacks (-27.0 yards), 15 interceptions for 282 yards with two touchdowns, 49 passes defensed, 29 QB pressures, four fumble recoveries and 11 forced fumbles. He added 27 special teams stops and 25 kickoff returns for 581 yards (23.2 avg.). His 720 career tackles with the Chiefs rank seventh in team history.

== Early life ==
Woods attended Melrose High School and won the state championship his senior year playing quarterback and free safety. He holds the Tennessee record for interceptions in a game (4), season (20) and career (45). He also played basketball in high school, winning the state championship in his junior year. He averaged 16.3 points per game. He was also a high school All-American.

== College career ==
In college, Woods played two seasons at the University of Memphis after transferring from Northeast Mississippi Community College. In two campaigns with UM, he tallied 219 tackles, 10 tackles for loss, seven interceptions, 17 pass break-ups, three forced fumbles, and three fumble recoveries with one touchdown. He was a three-time All-American in college.

== Professional career ==
Pre-draft measurables
Height	Weight	Arm length	Hand span	40-yard dash	10-yard split	20-yard split	Vertical jump
6 ft 2 in (1.88 m)	202 lb (92 kg)	33 in (0.84 m)	9 1/4 in (0.23 m)	4.59 s	1.66 s	2.76 s	33.5 in (0.85 m)

Woods was just the fifth player in Memphis history to be selected in the opening round of the NFL draft, when he was selected by Kansas City in 1996 with the 28th overall pick.

Woods made a remarkable comeback in 2003 to earn his initial Pro Bowl nod after missing the entire 2002 campaign with a broken right leg. Woods started all 16 games in 2003, recording 99 tackles (68 solo), three interceptions for 125 yards with two touchdowns, nine passes defensed, one fumble recovery and three forced fumbles.

He played in seven games in 2005, registering three tackles and three special teams stops. Woods enjoyed four triple-digit tackle campaigns with the Chiefs, including a career-high 132 tackles in his first year as a starter in ‘97. He also registered a career-best four interceptions that season as the Kansas City defense led the NFL in scoring defense by allowing just 14.5 points per game.

Upon his request, Woods was released by the Chiefs prior to the 2006 season. Woods could not find a new team to sign with for 2006, and on June 7, 2007, it was announced that the Chiefs had signed Woods to a one-day contract, allowing him to officially retire as a member of the Kansas City Chiefs. Woods moved to the club's Reserve/Retired list on June 8, 2007.

=== NFL statistics ===
Year	Team	Games	Combined tackles	Tackles	Assisted tackles	Sacks	Forced fumbles	Fumble recoveries	Fumble return yards	Interceptions	Interception return yards	Yards per interception return	Longest interception return	Interceptions returned for touchdown	Passes defended
1996	KC	16	7	5	2	0.0	0	0	0	0	0	0	0	0	2
1997	KC	16	85	66	19	1.0	2	2	0	4	57	14	27	0	5
1998	KC	16	79	54	25	0.0	2	0	0	2	47	24	28	0	11
1999	KC	15	76	67	9	0.0	2	1	0	1	5	5	5	0	6
2000	KC	16	81	73	8	2.0	1	0	0	2	0	0	0	0	8
2001	KC	16	87	74	13	1.0	1	0	0	3	48	16	25	0	4
2003	KC	16	76	58	18	0.0	3	1	0	3	125	42	79	2	11
2004	KC	10	41	35	6	1.0	1	0	0	0	0	0	0	0	1
2005	KC	7	2	2	0	0.0	0	0	0	0	0	0	0	0	0
Career		128	534	434	100	5.0	12	4	0	15	282	19	79	2	48
