= Priest Holmes =

American football player (born 1973)

No. 26, 33, 31
- Position: Running back

Personal information
- Born: October 7, 1973 (age 53); Fort Smith, Arkansas, U.S.
- Listed height: 5 ft 9 in (1.75 m)
- Listed weight: 213 lb (97 kg)

Career information
- High school: John Marshall (Leon Valley, Texas)
- College: Texas (1992–1996)
- NFL draft: 1997: undrafted

Career history
- Baltimore Ravens (1997–2000); Kansas City Chiefs (2001–2007)

Awards and highlights
- Super Bowl champion (XXXV); NFL Offensive Player of the Year (2002); 3× First-team All-Pro (2001–2003); 3× Pro Bowl (2001–2003); 2× NFL rushing touchdowns leader (2002, 2003); NFL rushing yards leader (2001); NFL scoring leader (2002); Kansas City Chiefs Hall of Honor; NFL record: 163.4 yards from scrimmage per game (2,287 yards in 14 games), single season (2002)

Career NFL statistics
- Rushing yards: 8,172
- Rushing average: 4.6
- Rushing touchdowns: 86
- Receptions: 339
- Receiving yards: 2,962
- Receiving touchdowns: 8
- Stats at Pro Football Reference

Priest Anthony Holmes (born October 7, 1973) is an American former professional football player who was a running back for 11 seasons in the National Football League (NFL). He started his career with the Baltimore Ravens but experienced breakout success after signing with the Kansas City Chiefs as a free agent in 2001. During his seven-year stint with the Chiefs, Holmes was a three-time All-Pro, three-time Pro Bowl selection and was named NFL Offensive Player of the Year in 2002. Prior to playing for the Chiefs, Holmes earned a Super Bowl ring with the Ravens, who'd signed him as an undrafted free agent in 1997, in their 2000 Super Bowl XXXV victory over the New York Giants. He rushed for just over 2,000 yards in four seasons in Baltimore. Holmes sat out the 2006 season with a neck injury, and after a brief comeback attempt in 2007, he retired from the NFL. One of the best undrafted rushers in NFL history, his 8,172 rushing yards is the second most by an undrafted player in league history.

Holmes played college football for the Texas Longhorns. He was inducted into the University of Texas Hall of Honor and the Texas High School Sports Hall of Fame in 2007. He was inducted into the Kansas City Chiefs Hall of Fame in 2014.

== Early life ==
Holmes was born in Fort Smith, Arkansas. Although he carries the last name of his biological father, he never met the man, and only attended his funeral. Holmes was raised in San Antonio, Texas, by his mother Norma, and stepfather Herman Morris. Holmes was raised in a military household as his stepfather was an aircraft technician at Kelly Air Force Base for 20 years. When he was 13, Holmes spent a summer in Detroit, Michigan, working for his grandfather's lawn care service. Working with much older men for 12 hours a day, six days a week, Holmes learned the work ethic that later shaped him as a football player.

Holmes, who had idolized Dallas Cowboys' running back Tony Dorsett growing up, developed his own elusive running style while playing street football with the children in his neighborhood. Holmes later attended John Marshall High School, where he became a starter for head coach David Visentine. As a senior in 1991, Holmes rushed for 2,061 yards, and led his team to a runner-up finish in the state championship game, losing to Odessa Permian.

== College career ==
Holmes attended the University of Texas at Austin from 1992 to 1996, playing the entire time for John Mackovic. He played in the final seven games of his freshman season, Mackovic's first as head coach, rushing for 114 yards against Houston. After starting two games and averaging over five yards per carry for the second straight season as a sophomore, Holmes received more significant playing time as a junior. He rushed for 524 yards and five touchdowns, and was named MVP of the 1994 Sun Bowl after rushing for 161 yards and four touchdowns in a win against North Carolina. Holmes missed the 1995 season with a knee injury, allowing for the emergence of future Heisman Trophy winner Ricky Williams as the starter. Relegated to third string behind Williams and Shon Mitchell, Holmes scored 13 touchdowns despite carrying the ball only 59 times. Holmes's biggest moment came in the inaugural Big 12 Championship Game. Entering the game with a 7–4 record against third-ranked Nebraska, Texas upset the Cornhuskers 37–27, with Holmes rushing for 120 yards and three touchdowns. In Holmes' final two seasons, Texas posted a record of 16–9, finishing ranked in the top 25 each season. He rushed for a career total of 1,276 yards and 20 touchdowns, averaging 5.1 yards per carry. During college, Holmes began going by his first name, Priest. He had previously used his middle name, Anthony.

== Professional career ==
Pre-draft measurables
Height	Weight	Arm length	Hand span	40-yard dash	10-yard split	20-yard split	20-yard shuttle	Three-cone drill	Vertical jump	Broad jump	Bench press
5 ft 8 7/8 in (1.75 m)	213 lb (97 kg)	30 5/8 in (0.78 m)	9 in (0.23 m)	4.73 s	1.62 s	2.72 s	4.14 s	7.40 s	33.0 in (0.84 m)	9 ft 7 in (2.92 m)	18 reps
All values from NFL Combine

=== Baltimore Ravens ===
After graduating from college, he joined Baltimore Ravens as an undrafted free agent in 1997. Holmes spent his entire rookie season behind Bam Morris, Earnest Byner, and Jay Graham as the team’s fourth-string running back. On September 24, 1997, Holmes made his professional regular season debut as part of the special teams unit during a 38–10 victory at the Tennessee Oilers in Week 4. He appeared in seven games as a rookie in 1997.

During training camp in 1998, Holmes competed to be the starting running back after the departures of Morris and Byner. Head coach Ted Marchibroda named Holmes the third running back on the depth chart to begin the regular season, behind Errict Rhett and Graham.

In the 1998 season with the Ravens, Holmes rushed for over 1,000 yards (leading the team in rushing) including one 200-plus yard game, the highest single game total of the season. In the 1999 season, he appeared in nine games and started four. He finished with 89 carries for 506 rushing yards and one rushing touchdown to go along with 13 receptions for 104 receiving yards and one receiving touchdown.

In the 2000 season, he was supplanted as a starter by rookie running back Jamal Lewis. The Ravens won Super Bowl XXXV 34–7 over the New York Giants with Holmes as their second string halfback.

=== Kansas City Chiefs ===
In 2001, Holmes signed an inexpensive contract with the Kansas City Chiefs. In his first season with the Chiefs, he exceeded expectations by leading the NFL in rushing with 1,555 yards for the 2001 NFL season, becoming the first undrafted player to do so (Arian Foster was next to accomplish the feat during the 2010 NFL season).

Despite missing the final two games in the 2002 NFL season because of a hip injury, Holmes rushed for 1,615 yards with 21 touchdowns. With three receiving touchdowns to go along with his rushing, he had 24 total touchdowns on the season. The team finished 8-8 and out of the playoffs as Holmes set a record for most total touchdowns for a player on a team that missed the playoffs. In the 2003 NFL season, he broke Marshall Faulk's NFL record for total touchdowns in a season with 27, which was subsequently broken by Shaun Alexander with 28 total touchdowns in 2005 and broken again by LaDainian Tomlinson with 31 total touchdowns in 2006. Holmes and Emmitt Smith are the only two running backs in NFL history to have back to back seasons with 20 or more rushing touchdowns. On a pace to repeat the feat in 2004, he suffered an injury that ended his season after eight games. He finished with 196 carries for 892 yards and 14 touchdowns.

Holmes's 2005 season was also cut short by an injury to his spinal column from a tackle by Shawne Merriman on October 30, 2005. He was replaced for the season by backup Larry Johnson. During the following off-season, new head coach Herm Edwards promoted Johnson to the starting position. Holmes's spinal injury did not heal by the end of the 2006 pre-season, and he was placed on the Chiefs' Physically Unable to Perform list for the season. Larry Johnson took over full-time as the Chiefs' starting running back. Throughout the 2006 season, Holmes repeatedly said that he would like to return for at least two or three more seasons in the NFL, but that he would not force a comeback if it could be detrimental to his long-term health.

Following encouraging medical tests, Holmes reported to the Chiefs' training camp in July 2007. However, the Chiefs did not include him on the roster at the start of the season, listing him on the non-football injury list instead. Michael Bennett was traded at mid-season, and Holmes returned to the Kansas City roster, beginning practice on October 17, 2007. Holmes then completed the comeback four days later, playing in the Chiefs regular season game against the Oakland Raiders, carrying the ball four times. He made his first start since October 30, 2005, against the San Diego Chargers and played in a home game on November 11, 2007, in a 27–11 loss to the Denver Broncos. Holmes led the Chiefs with 20 rushes for 65 yards.

=== Retirement ===
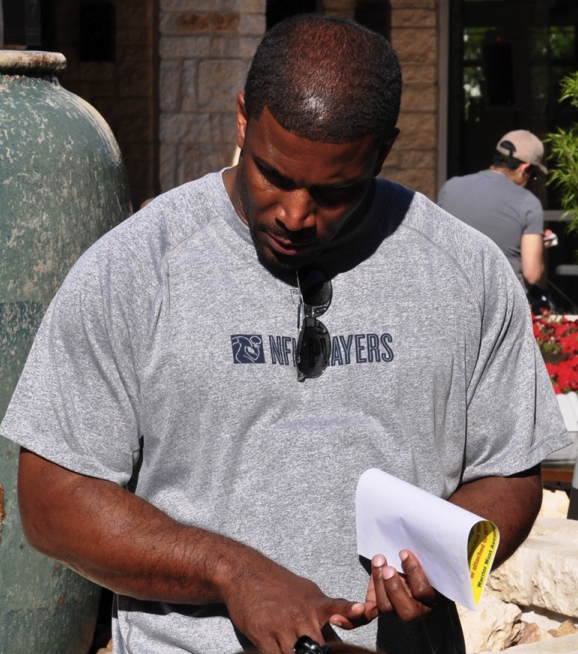
Holmes in 2011

Holmes announced his retirement on November 21, 2007, after re-injuring his neck on the previous Sunday, November 18, in a game against the Indianapolis Colts. He finished the 2007 season with 46 carries for 137 yards in four games.

=== Legacy ===
Holmes retired as the Chiefs' all-time leader for career rushing touchdowns (76), total touchdowns (83), and career rushing yards (6,070). His rushing yards record has since been broken by Jamaal Charles. Travis Kelce later broke Holmes's franchise record for total touchdowns. The team inducted Holmes into the Chiefs Hall of Fame during the 2014 season. The induction ceremony took place on November 2 at halftime of a game against the New York Jets.

Holmes has been a nominee for the Pro Football Hall of Fame nine times as of 2023, but has never advanced to a semi-finalist. He was nominated again in 2024 and 2025.

== NFL career statistics ==
Legend
	AP NFL Offensive Player of the Year
	Won the Super Bowl
	Led the league
**Bold**	Career high

=== Regular season ===
Year	Team	Games		Rushing							Receiving							Fumbles	
Year	Team	GP	GS	Att	Yds	Avg	Lng	TD	Y/G	A/G	Rec	Yds	Avg	Lng	TD	Y/G	R/G	Fum	Lost
1997	BAL	7	0	0	0	0.0	0	0	0.0	0.0	0	0	0.0	0	0	0.0	0.0	0	0
1998	BAL	16	13	233	1,008	4.3	56	7	63.0	14.6	43	260	6.0	25	0	16.3	2.7	3	**3**
1999	BAL	9	4	89	506	5.7	**72**	1	56.2	9.9	13	104	8.0	34	1	11.6	1.4	0	0
2000	BAL	16	2	137	588	4.3	21	2	36.8	8.6	32	221	6.9	27	0	13.8	2.0	2	1
2001	KC	16	16	**327**	1,555	4.8	41	8	97.2	20.4	62	614	**9.9**	**67**	2	38.4	3.9	**4**	**3**
2002	KC	14	14	313	**1,615**	**5.2**	56	21	**115.4**	22.4	70	672	9.6	64	**3**	**48.0**	**5.0**	1	1
2003	KC	16	16	320	1,420	4.4	31	**27**	88.8	20.0	**74**	**690**	9.3	36	0	43.1	4.6	1	1
2004	KC	8	8	196	892	4.6	33	14	111.5	**24.5**	19	187	9.8	52	1	23.4	2.4	**4**	2
2005	KC	7	7	119	451	3.8	35	6	64.4	17.0	21	197	9.4	60	1	28.1	3.0	1	0
2006	KC	0	0	Did not play due to injury															
2007	KC	4	2	46	137	3.0	11	0	34.3	11.5	5	17	3.4	8	0	4.3	1.3	0	0
Career		113	82	1,780	8,172	4.6	72	86	72.3	15.8	339	2,962	8.7	67	8	26.2	3.0	16	11

=== Postseason ===
Year	Team	Games		Rushing							Receiving							Fumbles	
Year	Team	GP	GS	Att	Yds	Avg	Lng	TD	Y/G	A/G	Rec	Yds	Avg	Lng	TD	Y/G	R/G	Fum	Lost
2000	BAL	4	1	18	45	2.5	11	0	11.3	4.5	1	4	4.0	4	0	1.0	0.3	0	0
2003	KC	1	1	24	176	7.3	48	2	176.0	24.0	5	32	6.4	13	0	5.0	32.0	1	1
2006	KC	0	0	Did not play due to injury															
Career		5	2	42	221	5.3	48	2	44.2	8.4	6	36	6.0	13	0	7.2	1.2	1	1

== Career highlights ==
=== Awards and honors ===
- Super Bowl champion (XXXV)
- NFL Offensive Player of the Year (2002)
- 3× First-team All-Pro (2001–2003)
- 3× Pro Bowl (2001–2003)
- 2× NFL rushing touchdowns leader (2002, 2003)
- 2× NFL scrimmage yards leader (2001, 2002)
- NFL rushing yards leader (2001)
- NFL scoring leader (2002)
- Kansas City Chiefs Hall of Honor inductee (2014)

=== Records ===
==== NFL records ====
- 163.4 yards from scrimmage per game (2,287 yards in 14 games), single season (2002)
- Most games with 2 or more touchdowns in season: 10 (2003) (tied with LaDainian Tomlinson)
- Most seasons with at least 20 rushing touchdowns: 2 (tied with Emmitt Smith)

==== Kansas City Chiefs franchise records ====
- Rushing touchdowns, career (76), season (27 in 2003)
- Rushing yards per game, career (93.4), season (115.4 in 2002)
- Total touchdowns, season (27 in 2003)
- Points scored, season (162 in 2003)

== Priest Holmes Foundation ==
The Priest Holmes Foundation is a recognized organization that is committed to encouraging education and enhancing the lives of children in the community.
