= 2004 Pro Bowl =

National Football League all-star game

2004 NFL Pro Bowl
AFC	NFC
52	55
Head coach: Tony Dungy (Indianapolis Colts)	Head coach: Andy Reid (Philadelphia Eagles)
	1	2	3	4	Total
AFC	17	14	7	14	52
NFC	10	3	14	28	55
- Date: February 8, 2004
- Stadium: Aloha Stadium; Honolulu, Hawaii
- MVP: Marc Bulger (St. Louis Rams)
- Referee: Pete Morelli
- Attendance: 50,127

Ceremonies
- National anthem: Kiley Dean
- Halftime show: Amy Hānaialiʻi Gilliom and Willie K (JC Chasez was scheduled to perform at the halftime show but the performance was cancelled due to the Super Bowl XXXVIII halftime show controversy)

TV in the United States
- Network: ESPN
- Announcers: Mike Patrick, Joe Theismann, and Paul Maguire

The 2004 Pro Bowl was the NFL's all-star game for the 2003 season. The game was played on February 8, 2004, at Aloha Stadium in Honolulu, Hawaii. The final score was NFC 55, AFC 52, the most points scored in a Pro Bowl game until 2024. Marc Bulger of the St. Louis Rams was the game's MVP.

== Game summary ==
The AFC's first play set the tone for what would become a high-scoring affair. Tennessee Titans quarterback Steve McNair faked a handoff to running back Jamal Lewis before throwing to Chad Johnson for a 90-yard touchdown pass, the third-longest scoring play in Pro Bowl history. After the NFC got the ball back, they were forced to punt after a three-and-out. However, the punt by Todd Sauerbrun was blocked, and Ed Reed of the Ravens recovered it and ran it into the end zone, giving the AFC a 14–0 lead early on. The NFC responded with a touchdown by Seahawks running back Shaun Alexander, and Jeff Wilkins kicked a field goal to bring the NFC to within four. After Mike Vanderjagt kicked a field goal of his own, the score at the end of the first quarter was 17–10 AFC. Peyton Manning came on for the AFC at the second quarter, and hit Colts teammate Marvin Harrison with a 50-yard strike, as well as another touchdown pass to Tony Gonzalez. Wilkins kicked another field goal for the NFC, and the halftime score was 31–13 in favor of the AFC.

The AFC continued to add onto their lead with a Jamal Lewis touchdown, putting the score at 38–13. However, Marc Bulger, who had taken over at NFC quarterback from Daunte Culpepper, threw two quick touchdown passes to Torry Holt and Keenan McCardell, to bring the score to 38–27 at the end of three. Once again, the AFC struck quickly at the start of a quarter, when Trent Green hit Clinton Portis with a 22-yard touchdown pass. With less than 14 minutes remaining in the game, the score was 45–27.

Bulger quickly threw a scoring pass to tight end Alge Crumpler, and a short time later hit Alexander with another touchdown pass. Although the two-point conversion attempt after Alexander's touchdown failed, the score was still 45–40 with just over five minutes to play. Just after that, Dré Bly picked off Manning and returned the interception for a touchdown, giving the NFC the lead for the first time in the game. Counting the successful two-point conversion after Bly's touchdown, the NFC had scored 18 points in 8 minutes. Alexander scored another rushing touchdown with three and a half minutes remaining to add to the NFC's lead. Manning, however, responded with a touchdown pass to Hines Ward, and the AFC was down by three. Safety Brock Marion picked off Bulger in the end zone and ran it back to the AFC's 22-yard line. Manning had 1:15 left on the clock and no timeouts. After two passes to his favorite target, Harrison, as well as another to Ward, the AFC found itself on the NFC's 21-yard line. Kris Jenkins sacked Manning to send the AFC back, though, and with six seconds left, Vanderjagt, who hadn't missed a kick (field goal or extra point) all season, was wide right on a 51-yard attempt.

The game set several records. Ironically, the AFC's total of 31 points in the first half was a Pro Bowl record, but wouldn't last the game, as the NFC responded by putting up 42 points in the second half.

=== Scoring summary ===
- 1st Quarter
  - AFC – Chad Johnson 90-yard pass from Steve McNair (Mike Vanderjagt kick), 12:25. AFC 7–0. Drive: 1 play, 90 yards, 0:15.
  - AFC – Ed Reed 23-yard blocked punt return (Mike Vanderjagt kick), 11:02. AFC 14–0.
  - NFC – Shaun Alexander 12-yard run (Jeff Wilkins kick), 7:29. AFC 14–7. Drive: 4 yards, 70 yards, 3:33.
  - NFC – Jeff Wilkins 28-yard field goal, 2:52. AFC 14–10. Drive: 6 plays, 60 yards, 3:22.
  - AFC – Mike Vanderjagt 27-yard field goal, 0:11. AFC 17–10. Drive: 7 plays, 77 yards, 2:41.
- 2nd Quarter
  - NFC – Jeff Wilkins 38-yard field goal, 10:07. AFC 17–13. Drive: 6 plays, 34 yards, 2:16.
  - AFC – Marvin Harrison 50-yard pass from Peyton Manning (Mike Vanderjagt kick), 6:44. AFC 24–13. Drive: 7 plays, 72 yards, 3:23.
  - AFC – Tony Gonzalez 9-yard pass from Peyton Manning (Mike Vanderjagt kick), 0:54. AFC 31–13. Drive: 10 plays, 60 yards, 3:58.
- 3rd Quarter
  - AFC – Jamal Lewis 22-yard run (Mike Vanderjagt kick), 11:08. AFC 38–13. Drive: 8 plays, 71 yards, 3:52.
  - NFC – Torry Holt 12-yard pass from Marc Bulger (Jeff Wilkins kick), 8:08. AFC 38–20. Drive: 2 plays, 28 yards, 0:45.
  - NFC – Keenan McCardell 2-yard pass from Marc Bulger (Jeff Wilkins kick), 5:47. AFC 38–27. Drive: 3 plays, 7 yards, 1:20.
- 4th Quarter
  - AFC – Clinton Portis 23-yard pass from Trent Green (Mike Vanderjagt kick), 13:14. AFC 45–27. Drive: 5 plays, 81 yards, 2:28.
  - NFC – Alge Crumpler 33-yard pass from Marc Bulger (Jeff Wilkins kick), 12:54. AFC 45–34. Drive: 1 play, 33 yards, 0:20.
  - NFC – Shaun Alexander 5-yard pass from Marc Bulger (pass failed), 5:43. AFC 45–40. Drive: 8 plays, 88 yards, 4:16.
  - NFC – Dré Bly 32-yard interception return (Ahman Green run), 4:50. NFC 48–45.
  - NFC – Shaun Alexander 2-yard run (Jeff Wilkins kick), 3:32. NFC: 55–45. Drive: 1 play, 2 yards, 0:03.
  - AFC – Hines Ward 10-yard pass from Peyton Manning (Mike Vanderjagt kick), 1:54. NFC: 55–52. Drive: 9 plays, 78 yards, 1:38.

== AFC roster ==
=== Offense ===
Position	Starter(s)	Reserve(s)	Alternate(s)
Quarterback	9 Steve McNair, Tennessee	10 Trent Green, Kansas City; 18 Peyton Manning, Indianapolis	
Running back	31 Jamal Lewis, Baltimore	31 Priest Holmes, Kansas City; 26 Clinton Portis, Denver	
Fullback	49 Tony Richardson, Kansas City		
Wide receiver	88 Marvin Harrison, Indianapolis; 85 Chad Johnson, Cincinnati	85 Derrick Mason, Tennessee; 86 Hines Ward, Pittsburgh	
Tight end	88 Tony Gonzalez, Kansas City	86 Todd Heap, Baltimore	
Offensive tackle	75 Jonathan Ogden, Baltimore; 77 Willie Roaf, Kansas City^{[b]}	71 Willie Anderson, Cincinnati^{[c]}	72 Brad Hopkins, Tennessee^{[a]}
Offensive guard	66 Brennan, Pittsburgh; 68 Will Shields, Kansas City	79 Ruben Brown, Buffalo	
Center	68 Kevin Mawae, N.Y. Jets	66 Tom Nalen, Denver	

=== Defense ===
Position	Starter(s)	Reserve(s)	Alternate(s)
Defensive end	93 Dwight Freeney, Indianapolis; 93 Adewale Ogunleye, Miami	92 Shaun Ellis, N.Y. Jets	
Defensive tackle	93 Richard Seymour, New England; 99 Marcus Stroud, Jacksonville	98 Casey Hampton, Pittsburgh	
Outside linebacker	58 Peter Boulware, Baltimore^{[b]} 51 Takeo Spikes, Buffalo	53 Keith Bulluck, Tennessee^{[c]}	55 Willie McGinest, New England^{[a]}
Inside linebacker	52 Ray Lewis, Baltimore	54 Zach Thomas, Miami	56 Al Wilson, Denver^{[d]}
Cornerback	24 Ty Law, New England; 23 Patrick Surtain, Miami	21 Chris McAlister, Baltimore	
Free safety	20 Ed Reed, Baltimore		
Strong safety	31 Brock Marion, Miami	21 Jerome Woods, Kansas City	

=== Special teams ===
Position	Starter(s)	Reserve(s)	Alternate(s)
Punter	15 Craig Hentrich, Tennessee		
Placekicker	13 Mike Vanderjagt, Indianapolis		
Kick returner	82 Dante Hall, Kansas City		
Special teamer	96 Adalius Thomas, Baltimore^{[b]}		55 Gary Stills, Kansas City^{[a]}

== NFC roster ==
=== Offense ===
Position	Starter(s)	Reserve(s)	Alternate(s)
Quarterback	11 Daunte Culpepper, Minnesota	4 Brett Favre, Green Bay^{[b]} 5 Donovan McNabb, Philadelphia^{[b]}	8 Matt Hasselbeck, Seattle^{[a]} 10 Marc Bulger, St. Louis^{[a]}
Running back	30 Ahman Green, Green Bay	48 Stephen Davis, Carolina; 26 Deuce McAllister, New Orleans^{[b]}	37 Shaun Alexander, Seattle^{[a]}
Fullback	40 Fred Beasley, San Francisco		
Wide receiver	81 Torry Holt, St. Louis; 84 Randy Moss, Minnesota^{[b]}	81 Anquan Boldin, Arizona^{[c]} 81 Terrell Owens, San Francisco^{[b]}	87 Keenan McCardell, Tampa Bay^{[a]} 80 Laveranues Coles, Washington^{[a]}
Tight end	83 Alge Crumpler, Atlanta	80 Jeremy Shockey, N.Y. Giants^{[b]}	88 Bubba Franks, Green Bay^{[a]}
Offensive tackle	76 Flozell Adams, Dallas; 76 Orlando Pace, St. Louis	71 Walter Jones, Seattle	
Offensive guard	73 Larry Allen, Dallas; 62 Marco Rivera, Green Bay	65 LeCharles Bentley, New Orleans^{[b]}	76 Steve Hutchinson, Seattle^{[a]}
Center	57 Olin Kreutz, Chicago^{[b]}	78 Matt Birk, Minnesota^{[c]}	58 Mike Flanagan, Green Bay^{[a]}

=== Defense ===
Position	Starter(s)	Reserve(s)	Alternate(s)
Defensive end	97 Simeon Rice, Tampa Bay^{[b]} 92 Michael Strahan, N.Y. Giants	91 Leonard Little, St. Louis^{[c]}	94 Kabeer Gbaja-Biamila, Green Bay^{[a]} 93 Mike Rucker, Carolina^{[d]}
Defensive tackle	97 La'Roi Glover, Dallas; 77 Kris Jenkins, Carolina	99 Warren Sapp, Tampa Bay^{[b]}	90 Corey Simon, Philadelphia^{[a]}
Outside linebacker	56 LaVar Arrington, Washington; 55 Derrick Brooks, Tampa Bay^{[b]}	98 Julian Peterson, San Francisco^{[c]}	52 Dexter Coakley, Dallas^{[a]}
Inside linebacker	54 Brian Urlacher, Chicago	56 Keith Brooking, Atlanta	
Cornerback	24 Champ Bailey, Washington; 32 Dré Bly, Detroit	23 Troy Vincent, Philadelphia	
Free safety	21 Corey Chavous, Minnesota		
Strong safety	31 Roy Williams, Dallas	35 Aeneas Williams, St. Louis	

=== Special teams ===
Position	Starter(s)	Reserve(s)	Alternate(s)
Punter	10 Todd Sauerbrun, Carolina		
Placekicker	14 Jeff Wilkins, St. Louis		
Kick returner	23 Jerry Azumah, Chicago		
Special teamer	85 Alex Bannister, Seattle		

Notes:

^{a} Replacement selection due to injury or vacancy
^{b} Injured player; selected but did not play
^{c} Replacement starter; selected as reserve
^{d} "Need player"; named by coach

== Number of selections per team ==
AFC team	Selections	NFC team	Selections
Kansas City Chiefs	9	Green Bay Packers	6
Baltimore Ravens	8	St. Louis Rams	6
Tennessee Titans	5	Dallas Cowboys	5
Indianapolis Colts	4	Seattle Seahawks	5
Miami Dolphins	4	Carolina Panthers	4
Denver Broncos	3	Minnesota Vikings	4
New England Patriots	3	Tampa Bay Buccaneers	4
Pittsburgh Steelers	3	Chicago Bears	3
Buffalo Bills	2	Philadelphia Eagles	3
Cincinnati Bengals	2	San Francisco 49ers	3
New York Jets	2	Washington Redskins	3
Jacksonville Jaguars	1	Atlanta Falcons	2
Cleveland Browns	0	New Orleans Saints	2
Houston Texans	0	New York Giants	2
Oakland Raiders	0	Arizona Cardinals	1
San Diego Chargers	0	Detroit Lions	1
