= 2003 All-Pro Team =

Official list of the best NFL players in 2003

The 2003 All-Pro Team is composed of the National Football League players that were named to the Associated Press, Pro Football Writers Association, and The Sporting News All-Pro Teams in 2003. Both first and second teams are listed for the AP team. These are the three teams that are included in Total Football II: The Official Encyclopedia of the National Football League. In 2003 the Pro Football Writers Association and Pro Football Weekly combined their All-pro teams, a practice with continues through 2008.

== Teams ==
Offense
Position	First team	Second team
Quarterback	Peyton Manning, Indianapolis Colts (AP, PFWA, TSN)	Steve McNair, Tennessee Titans (AP-2)
Running back	Priest Holmes, Kansas City Chiefs (AP, PFWA, TSN); Jamal Lewis, Baltimore Ravens (AP, PFWA, TSN)	LaDainian Tomlinson, San Diego Chargers (AP-2); Fred Beasley, San Francisco 49ers (AP-2)
Wide receiver	Randy Moss, Minnesota Vikings (AP, PFWA); Torry Holt, St. Louis Rams (AP, PFWA, TSN); Marvin Harrison, Indianapolis Colts (TSN)	Hines Ward, Pittsburgh Steelers (AP-2); Chad Johnson, Cincinnati Bengals (AP-2t); Marvin Harrison, Indianapolis Colts (AP-2t)
Tight end	Tony Gonzalez, Kansas City Chiefs (AP, PFWA, TSN)	Todd Heap, Baltimore Ravens (AP-2)
Tackle	Jonathan Ogden, Baltimore Ravens (AP, PFWA, TSN); Willie Roaf, Kansas City Chiefs (AP-t, PFWA); Orlando Pace, St. Louis Rams (AP-t, TSN)	Willie Anderson, Cincinnati Bengals (AP-2)
Guard	Will Shields, Kansas City Chiefs (AP, PFWA, TSN); Steve Hutchinson, Seattle Seahawks (AP, PFWA, TSN)	Alan Faneca, Pittsburgh Steelers (AP-2); Marco Rivera, Green Bay Packers (AP-2)
Center	Tom Nalen, Denver Broncos (AP, PFWA); Matt Birk, Minnesota Vikings (TSN)	Matt Birk, Minnesota Vikings (AP-2)

Special teams
Position	First team	Second team
Kicker	Mike Vanderjagt, Indianapolis Colts (AP, PFWA, TSN)	Jeff Wilkins, St. Louis Rams (AP-2)
Punter	Shane Lechler, Oakland Raiders (AP, PFWA); Todd Sauerbrun, Carolina Panthers (TSN)	Todd Sauerbrun, Carolina Panthers (AP-2)
Kick Returner	Dante Hall, Kansas City Chiefs (AP, PFWA); Jerry Azumah, Chicago Bears (TSN)	Jerry Azumah, Chicago Bears (AP-2)
Punt Returner	Dante Hall, Kansas City Chiefs (PFWA, TSN)	
Special Teams	Alex Bannister, Seattle Seahawks (PFWA)	

Defense
Position	First team	Second team
Defensive end	Michael Strahan, New York Giants (AP, PFWA, TSN); Leonard Little, St. Louis Rams (AP, PFWA); Simeon Rice, Tampa Bay Buccaneers (TSN)	Dwight Freeney, Indianapolis Colts (AP-2); Simeon Rice, Tampa Bay Buccaneers (AP-2)
Defensive tackle	Richard Seymour, New England Patriots (AP, PFWA, TSN); Kris Jenkins, Carolina Panthers (AP, PFWA, TSN)	Marcus Stroud, Jacksonville Jaguars (AP-2); La'Roi Glover, Dallas Cowboys (AP-2)
Inside linebacker	Ray Lewis, Baltimore Ravens (AP, PFWA, TSN); Zach Thomas, Miami Dolphins (AP)	Dat Nguyen, Dallas Cowboys (AP-2); Tedy Bruschi, New England Patriots (AP-2)
Outside linebacker	Julian Peterson, San Francisco 49ers (AP, PFWA, TSN); Keith Bulluck, Tennessee Titans, (AP, PFWA); Derrick Brooks, Tampa Bay Buccaneers (TSN)	LaVar Arrington, Washington Redskins (AP-2); Derrick Brooks, Tampa Bay Buccaneers (AP-2)
Cornerback	Chris McAlister, Baltimore Ravens (AP, PFWA); Ty Law, New England Patriots (AP, PFWA); Patrick Surtain, Miami Dolphins (TSN); Champ Bailey, Washington Redskins (TSN)	Patrick Surtain, Miami Dolphins (AP-2); Champ Bailey, Washington Redskins (AP-2)
Safety	Roy Williams, Dallas Cowboys (AP, PFWA, TSN); Ed Reed, Baltimore Ravens (PFWA, TSN); Rodney Harrison, New England Patriots (AP)	Ed Reed, Baltimore Ravens (AP-2); Tony Parrish, San Francisco 49ers (AP-2)

== Key ==
- AP = Associated Press first-team All-Pro
- AP-2 = Associated Press second-team All-Pro
- PFWA = Pro Football Writers Association All-NFL
- TSN = The Sporting News All-Pro
