= Dante Hall =

American football player (born 1978)

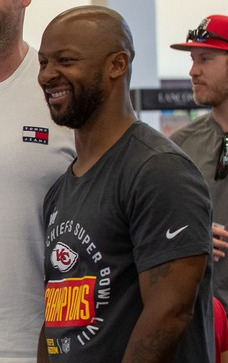
- Hall in 2023

No. 20, 82
- Positions: Wide receiver, return specialist

Personal information
- Born: September 20, 1978 (age 48); Lufkin, Texas, U.S.
- Listed height: 5 ft 8 in (1.73 m)
- Listed weight: 187 lb (85 kg)

Career information
- High school: Nimitz (Houston, Texas)
- College: Texas A&M (1996–1999)
- NFL draft: 2000: 5th round, 153rd overall pick

Career history
- Kansas City Chiefs (2000–2006); → Scottish Claymores (2001); St. Louis Rams (2007–2008)

Awards and highlights
- First-team All-Pro (2003); Second-team All-Pro (2002); 2× Pro Bowl (2002, 2003); NFL kickoff return yards leader (2004); 2× NFL 2000s All-Decade Team (Note: Hall has the unique distinction of being the only player to be selected to the 2000s All-Decade Team at two positions, kick returner and punt returner.); Kansas City Chiefs Hall of Fame; NCAA punt return yards leader (1996); First-team All-Big 12 (1996); Second-team All-Big 12 (1997)

Career NFL statistics
- Receptions: 162
- Receiving yards: 1,747
- Receiving touchdowns: 9
- Return yards: 12,397
- Return touchdowns: 12
- Stats at Pro Football Reference

Damieon Dante Hall (born September 20, 1978) is an American former professional football player who was a wide receiver and return specialist for nine seasons in the National Football League (NFL). He is nicknamed "the Human Joystick" and "the X-Factor". He played college football for the Texas A&M Aggies and was selected by the Kansas City Chiefs in the fifth round of the 2000 NFL draft. Hall played for the Chiefs for seven years before being traded to the St. Louis Rams in 2007. Hall was ranked the 10th greatest return specialist in NFL history on NFL Network's NFL Top 10 Return Aces. He was inducted into the Missouri Sports Hall of Fame in 2018.

== College career ==
Hall played for Texas A&M University as a running back and return specialist. In 1996, he led the nation with 573 punt return yards. In 1998, he was named offensive MVP of the Aggies football team. His 4,707 career all-purpose yards place him second in school history behind Darren Lewis. He majored in Ag Leadership & Development.

On November 8, 1999, Texas A&M announced Hall's dismissal from the team for violations of the team's policy. Hall stated he thinks he was ousted due to parking violations.

Hall was inducted into the Texas A&M Athletic Hall of Fame in 2021.

== Professional career ==
Pre-draft measurables
Height	Weight	Arm length	Hand span	40-yard dash	10-yard split	20-yard split	20-yard shuttle	Three-cone drill	Vertical jump	Broad jump	Bench press
5 ft 7 3/4 in (1.72 m)	191 lb (87 kg)	29 1/2 in (0.75 m)	8 7/8 in (0.23 m)	4.42 s	1.55 s	2.56 s	3.82 s	6.62 s	38.0 in (0.97 m)	10 ft 3 in (3.12 m)	18 reps
All values from NFL Combine

=== Kansas City Chiefs ===
The Kansas City Chiefs drafted Hall in the fifth-round of the 2000 NFL Draft. He made his NFL debut on September 24, 2000, as a kick/punt returner. In five games, he returned 17 kickoffs for 358 yards and six punts for 37 yards.

He spent the spring of 2001 playing in NFL Europe for the Scottish Claymores as a wide receiver. He led the league with 26 kickoff returns for 635 yards and was second in punt returns with 15 for 177 yards and second in combined net yards with 1,286.

In 2002, Hall had his first NFL touchdown off a 60-yard reception at the New York Jets on October 6, 2002. Hall returned one kickoff and two punts for touchdowns. His two touchdowns off punt returns tied him for first in Chief franchise history. The 2002 NFL season earned Hall his first NFL Pro Bowl, being selected as a kick returner. Hall became the second player in NFL history to return a kickoff and a punt return for a touchdown in the same game.

In 2003, Hall returned a kickoff or a punt for a touchdown four games in a row, which is an NFL record. The most memorable moment of the season came against the Denver Broncos in which he reversed direction twice to evade the entire special teams unit en route to a 93-yard punt return for a touchdown, his 7th in the 10-game stretch from the previous season, then went on to score 10 total touchdowns in 13 games. In the playoffs that year against the Indianapolis Colts, Hall had another kickoff return for a touchdown, giving him five for the year, as well as a receiving touchdown. Hall was named to the 2004 Pro Bowl as a kick/punt returner for his second time.

In 2004, Hall touched the ball eight times for 242 yards vs. the San Diego Chargers on November 28, 2004. His six kickoff returns for 233 yards with a 96-yard touchdown in the game set a career-high. On December 19, 2004, he returned the opening kickoff 97-yards for a touchdown. This touchdown made him the Chiefs' franchise leader in career kickoff return touchdowns and career special teams touchdowns. During the 2004 NFL season, Hall set single-season Chiefs' franchise records with 68 kickoff returns and career-high 1,718 kickoff return yards.

In 2005, in a memorable game against the Denver Broncos, Hall appeared to be on his way to a kickoff return for a touchdown, but he surprisingly fumbled the ball without being touched by a defensive player. With a touchdown on a kickoff return against the Philadelphia Eagles on October 2, 2005, he tied four players, among them Ollie Matson and Gale Sayers, for the most career kickoff return touchdowns, with six. That record stood until Joshua Cribbs broke it in 2009. Hall's sixth return was also his 10th return touchdown, placing him third in that category behind Brian Mitchell (13) and Eric Metcalf (12).

In 2006, Hall had two kickoff returns for 86 yards and three punt returns for seven yards in Week 12 vs. the Denver Broncos on November 23, 2006. This game made him the sixth player to have 10,000 career kick return yards. Hall played his second postseason game at Indianapolis on January 6, 2007, in a rematch from the 2003 Divisional Playoffs.

=== St. Louis Rams ===
In 2007, Hall was traded along with a third-round draft pick to the St. Louis Rams for their third and fifth-round draft pick in the 2007 NFL Draft. Hall tied Metcalf on September 30, 2007, against the Dallas Cowboys with his 12th return touchdown. On October 7, 2008, Hall injured his ankle vs. the Arizona Cardinals, missing four games. He further aggravated his ankle on October 25, 2008, vs. the Seattle Seahawks and was placed on injured reserve.

== After football ==
In 2013, Hall worked as an assistant coach at St. Anthony High School in Long Beach, California. In 2016, he spent several months as a radio host for KILT-FM in Houston, Texas.

== NFL career statistics ==
Receiving Stats

Year	Team	GP	Rec	Yards	Avg	Lng	TD	FD	Fum	Lost
2002	KC	16	20	322	16.1	75	3	11	0	0
2003	KC	16	40	423	10.6	67	1	16	0	0
2004	KC	16	25	230	9.2	22	0	15	0	0
2005	KC	16	34	436	12.8	52	3	19	0	0
2006	KC	15	26	204	7.8	19	2	15	0	0
2007	STL	7	5	27	5.4	12	0	2	0	0
2008	STL	8	12	105	8.8	20	0	7	0	0
Career		94	162	1,747	10.8	75	9	85	0	0

Rushing Stats

Year	Team	GP	Att	Yards	Avg	Lng	TD	FD	Fum	Lost
2001	KC	13	2	10	5.0	6	0	1	0	0
2002	KC	16	11	54	4.9	21	0	4	0	0
2003	KC	16	16	73	4.6	16	0	5	0	0
2004	KC	16	8	56	7.0	17	0	2	0	0
2005	KC	16	7	11	1.6	7	0	0	0	0
2006	KC	15	3	11	3.7	9	0	0	0	0
2007	STL	7	3	18	6.0	9	0	2	0	0
2008	STL	8	4	9	2.3	10	0	2	0	0
Career		107	54	242	4.5	21	0	16	0	0

Returning Stats

Year	Team	GP	PRet	Yards	Lng	TD	FC	KRet	Yards	Lng	TD	FC
2000	KC	5	6	37	22	0	5	17	358	36	0	0
2001	KC	13	32	235	26	0	6	43	969	71	0	0
2002	KC	16	29	390	90	2	11	57	1,354	88	1	0
2003	KC	16	29	472	93	2	14	57	1,478	100	2	0
2004	KC	16	23	232	46	0	17	68	1,718	97	2	0
2005	KC	16	42	276	52	0	6	65	1,560	96	1	0
2006	KC	15	27	240	60	1	6	53	1,207	60	0	0
2007	STL	7	19	286	85	1	6	29	729	84	0	0
2008	STL	8	9	93	34	0	1	37	763	41	0	0
Career		112	216	2,261	93	6	72	426	10,136	100	6	0

=== Chiefs franchise records ===
- Career kick return yards (8,644)
- Career kick return touchdowns (6)
- Career punt return touchdowns (5)
- Career combined punt and kickoff return touchdowns (11)
- Kickoff return yards in a single season: 1,718 (2004)
- All-purpose yards in a single season: 2,446 (2003)

== Media ==
Hall is the co-author of Dante Hall: X-Factor, a book that details his journey from Texas A&M running back to one of the best kick returners in the NFL. He is mentioned in Lil Wayne's song "Dipset (Reppin Time)" in the line "I'm like Dante Hall, I just throw up the X." Hall appeared as a guest on the Late Show with David Letterman on October 30, 2003.

=== Nicknames ===
Hall has established many nicknames in his career, perhaps the best known being "X-factor", referring to how whenever he scored a touchdown he would cross his forearms to resemble an "X".

In 2004, he was selected to star in the inaugural advertisement for Gatorade's X-Factor sports drink because he often proved to be the "X-factor" in many Chiefs victories during the 2003 NFL season.

Hall was also known as "The Human Joystick", referring to the agility he showed during returns.
