= Jason Dunn (American football) =

American football player and coach (born 1973)

No. 87, 89
- Position: Tight end

Personal information
- Born: November 15, 1973 (age 52); Harrodsburg, Kentucky, U.S.
- Listed height: 6 ft 6 in (1.98 m)
- Listed weight: 276 lb (125 kg)

Career information
- High school: Harrodsburg
- College: Eastern Kentucky
- NFL draft: 1996: 2nd round, 54th overall pick

Career history

Playing
- Philadelphia Eagles (1996–1998); Kansas City Chiefs (2000–2007)

Coaching
- Lafayette High School (2010–2013) Offensive line coach; Kentucky State (2013–2022) Special teams coach

Career NFL statistics
- Receptions: 81
- Receiving yards: 910
- Receiving touchdowns: 11
- Stats at Pro Football Reference

Jason Adam Dunn (born November 15, 1973) is an American former professional football player who was a tight end in the National Football League (NFL). He was selected by the Philadelphia Eagles in the second round of the 1996 NFL draft. He played college football for the Eastern Kentucky Colonels. After his playing career, he became a coach.

== Professional career ==
After playing for the Eagles for three seasons, Dunn missed the 1999 season due to a knee injury. He was then signed by the Kansas City Chiefs in July 2000.

Dunn was primarily used as a blocking tight end for the Chiefs; former teammate Tony Gonzalez was the primary receiving tight end. On February 27, 2008, after spending eight years with the Chiefs, he was released by the team.

== Coaching career ==
In July 2010, Dunn was hired as the offensive line coach at Lafayette High School in Kentucky. In July 2013, he was hired as the special teams coordinator at Kentucky State University.
