= 2006 Kansas City Chiefs season =

47th season in franchise history; final with Lamar Hunt

- Owner: Lamar Hunt (until death); The Hunt family (Clark Hunt Chairman and CEO) (after Dec. 13)
- General manager: Carl Peterson
- Head coach: Herm Edwards
- Offensive coordinator: Mike Solari
- Defensive coordinator: Gunther Cunningham
- Home stadium: Arrowhead Stadium

Results
- Record: 9–7
- Division place: 2nd AFC West
- Playoffs: Lost Wild Card Playoffs (at Colts) 8–23
- All-Pros: 3: RB Larry Johnson (1st team); TE Tony Gonzalez (2nd team); G Will Shields (2nd team)
- Pro Bowlers: 4: TE Tony Gonzalez; RB Larry Johnson; G Will Shields; G Brian Waters

Uniform
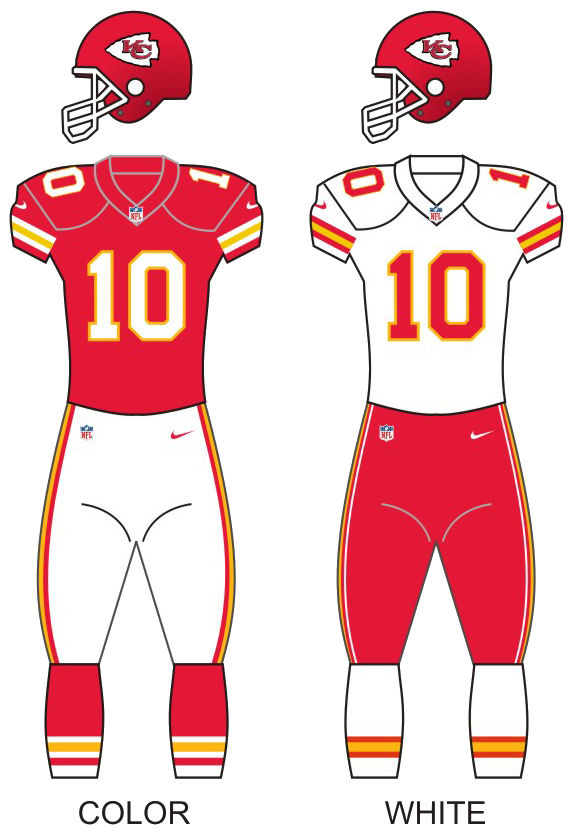

The 2006 season was the Kansas City Chiefs' 37th in the National Football League (NFL), their 47th overall, their 44th in Kansas City, and their first under head coach Herm Edwards. Despite failing to improve on their 10–6 record from 2005, they finished 9-7 and made a wild card playoff spot, unlike the previous year.

The team endured many setbacks during the 2006 season, including the loss of starting quarterback Trent Green in the first game, the readjustment of a record-breaking offense, and the death of owner and founder Lamar Hunt on December 13, 2006. Despite these setbacks, the team gained momentum and finished second in the AFC West with a 4–2 divisional record.

The Chiefs entered Week 17 of the season a long shot to make the playoffs, needing a win and a loss from the Denver Broncos, Cincinnati Bengals, and Tennessee Titans. In an unlikely clinching scenario, the Chiefs defeated the Jaguars 35–30, the Broncos, Bengals and the Titans lost, allowing the Chiefs to clinch the sixth seed in the 2006–07 playoffs and clinching their first playoff berth since the 2003 season. The Chiefs lost in the Wild Card round of the playoffs 23–8 to their playoff rival and eventual Super Bowl champions, the Indianapolis Colts.

== Staff ==
2006 Kansas City Chiefs staff
Front office: Chairman/CEO – Lamar Hunt; President/General manager – Carl Peterson; Manager of football operations and player development - Nate Wainwright; Head coaches: Head coach – Herm Edwards; Assistant to the head coach – Dick Curl; Offensive coaches: Offensive coordinator – Mike Solari; Quarterbacks/passing game coordinator – Terry Shea; Running backs – James Saxon; Wide receivers – Charlie Joiner; Tight ends – Jon Embree; Offensive line – John Matsko; Offensive assistant/quality control – Mike Ketchum	Defensive coaches: Defensive coordinator – Gunther Cunningham; Defensive line – Tim Krumrie; Linebackers – Don Blackmon; Defensive backs – David Gibbs; Defensive assistant/quality control – Darvin Wallis; Special teams coaches: Special teams coordinator - Mike Priefer; Strength and conditioning: Strength and conditioning – Jeff Hurd; Assistant strength and conditioning – Kaz Kazadi; Assistant strength and conditioning – Billy Long

== Offseason ==
Dick Vermeil, head coach, retired after the Chiefs' 2005 campaign. On Monday, January 9, 2006, the Chiefs made their first step throughout the 2006 offseason when they hired Herman Edwards from the New York Jets as the new head coach.

=== Draft ===
Note: The Chiefs exchanged their fourth round draft pick to the New York Jets in order to acquire coach Herman Edwards.

2006 Kansas City Chiefs draft
Round	Selection	Player	Position	College
1	20	Tamba Hali	Defensive end	Penn State
2	54	Bernard Pollard	Strong safety	Purdue
3	85	Brodie Croyle	Quarterback	Alabama
5	154	Marcus Maxey	Cornerback	Miami
6	186	Tre' Stallings	Guard	Ole Miss
6	190	Jeff Webb	Wide receiver	San Diego State
7	228	Jarrad Page	Strong safety	UCLA

=== Roster moves ===
Just before training camp, Pro Bowl cornerback Ty Law was added to Kansas City's lineup to strengthen the defense. To help the offense, Left tackle Kyle Turley made his first appearance post-two-year absence from the NFL, and Running back Michael Bennett was acquired to back up Larry Johnson. The Chiefs signed quarterback Casey Printers, who had success in the Canadian Football League, to their practice squad.

Key losses to the team included the heart and soul of the team's offense; Pro Bowl tackles Willie Roaf and John Welbourn announcing their retirements (Welbourn later returned to the team in week eight following a suspension served after his reinstatement), and Fullback Tony Richardson was signed by the Minnesota Vikings.

== Final roster ==
2006 Kansas City Chiefs roster
Quarterbacks (QB): 12 Brodie Croyle; 10 Trent Green; 11 Damon Huard; 7 Casey Printers; Running backs (RB): 26 Michael Bennett; 22 Dee Brown; 27 Larry Johnson; 39 Derrick Ross; Wide receivers (WR): 85 Rod Gardner; 82 Dante Hall; 81 Chris Hannon; 87 Eddie Kennison; 18 Samie Parker; 80 Jeff Webb; Tight ends (TE): 88 Tony Gonzalez; 84 Kris Wilson	Offensive linemen (OL): 65 Jordan Black T; 67 Chris Bober G/T; 64 Rudy Niswanger C; 68 Will Shields G; 61 Tre' Stallings G; 60 Chris Terry T; 54 Brian Waters G; 76 John Welbourn T; 62 Casey Wiegmann C; Defensive linemen (DL): 69 Jared Allen DE; 95 Ron Edwards DT; 91 Tamba Hali DE; 98 Eric Hicks DE; 92 James Reed DT; 75 Tim Sandidge DT; 90 Ryan Sims DT; 96 Jimmy Wilkerson DE/DT; 70 Steve Williams DT	Linebackers (LB): 99 Kendrell Bell OLB; 97 Keyaron Fox OLB; 53 Kris Griffin OLB; 51 Boomer Grigsby MLB; 56 Derrick Johnson OLB; 52 William Kershaw OLB; 50 Kawika Mitchell MLB; Defensive backs (DB): 29 Sammy Knight SS; 24 Ty Law CB; 45 Marcus Maxey CB; 44 Jarrad Page FS; 49 Bernard Pollard SS; 20 Benny Sapp CB; 23 Patrick Surtain CB; 35 Lenny Walls CB; 25 Greg Wesley FS; Special teams (ST): 2 Dustin Colquitt P; 83 Kendall Gammon LS; 1 Lawrence Tynes K	Practice squad: 38 Michael Bragg CB; 43 Greg Hanoian FB; 66 Johnathan Ingram C; 72 Montez Murphy DE; 48 Keith Willis TE; Reserve: 21 William Bartee S (PUP); 42 Ronnie Cruz FB (IR); 89 Jason Dunn TE (IR); 31 Priest Holmes RB (PUP); 79 Kevin Sampson T (IR); 55 Rich Scanlon LB (IR); 71 Will Svitek T (IR); 74 Kyle Turley T (IR); Rookies in italics 53 active, 8 reserve, 5 practice squad

== Training camp & Pre-season ==
The Chiefs held training camp at the University of Wisconsin–River Falls. The team reported July 28 and broke camp on August 18. On August 4, the Chiefs scrimmaged the Minnesota Vikings in Mankato, Minnesota.

In the preseason, the Chiefs lost to the Houston Texans on August 12 and the New York Giants on August 17. For their preseason home games, the Chiefs defeated the St. Louis Rams and retained the Missouri Governor's Cup on August 26 and also defeated the New Orleans Saints on August 31.

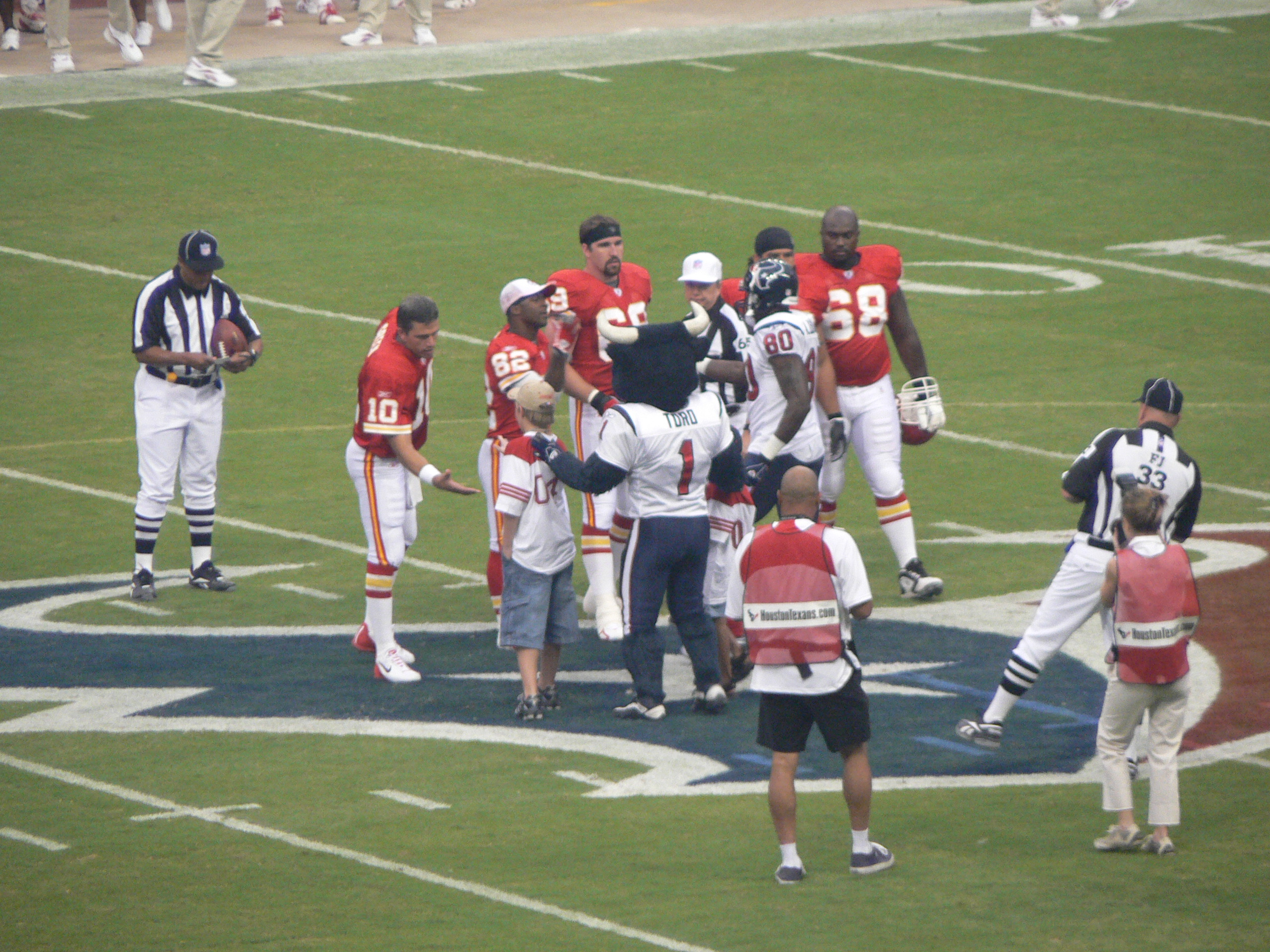
Coin toss at the Chiefs' game at Houston

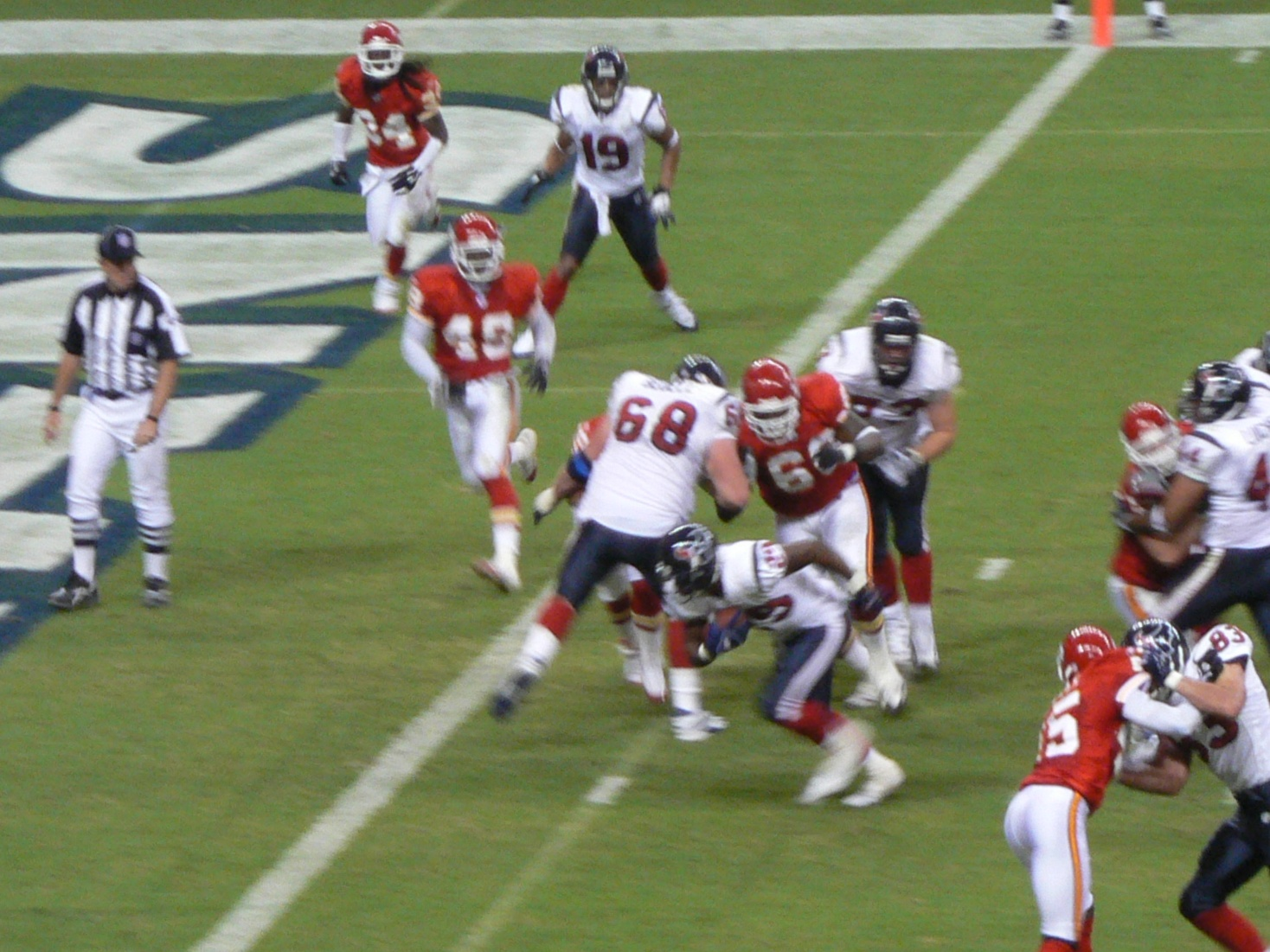
Houston's Damien Rhodes scores, August 12

== Preseason ==
=== Schedule ===
Week	Date	Opponent	Result	Record	Venue	Recap
1	August 12	at Houston Texans	L 14–24	0–1	Reliant Stadium	Recap
2	August 17	at New York Giants	L 0–17	0–2	Giants Stadium	Recap
3	August 26	St. Louis Rams	W 16–12	1–2	Arrowhead Stadium	Recap
4	August 31	New Orleans Saints	W 10–9	2–2	Arrowhead Stadium	Recap

=== Game summaries ===
==== Week 1: at Houston Texans ====
Week 1: Kansas City Chiefs at Houston Texans – Game summary

Quarter	1	2	3	4	Total
Chiefs	0	7	0	7	14
Texans	7	7	3	7	24

at Reliant Stadium, Houston, Texas

- Date: August 12
- Game time: 7:00 p.m. CDT
- Game weather: None (retractable roof closed)
- Game attendance: 70,016
- Referee: Walt Coleman
- Recap, Game Book

Game information

First quarter

- HOU – Wali Lundy 3-yard run (Kris Brown kick), 3:32. Texans 7–0. Drive: 13 plays, 65 yards, 7:02.

Second quarter

- KC – Dee Brown 12-yard run (Lawrence Tynes kick), 11:20. Tied 7–7. Drive: 13 plays, 71 yards, 8:12.
- HOU – Sage Rosenfels 5-yard run (Kris Brown kick), 1:53. Texans 14–7. Drive: 8 plays, 64 yards, 4:15.

Third quarter

- HOU – Kris Brown 22-yard field goal, 7:47. Texans 17–7. Drive: 7 plays, 18 yards, 2:59.

Fourth quarter

- HOU – Damien Rhodes 4-yard run (Kris Brown kick), 5:42. Texans 24–7. Drive: 13 plays, 71 yards, 7:40.
- KC – Quentin Griffin 1-yard run (Lawrence Tynes kick), 1:50. Texans 24–14. Drive: 3 plays, 7 yards, 0:26.

Top passers

- KC – Casey Printers – 6/12, 71 yards, INT
- HOU – Sage Rosenfels – 10/18, 78 yards

Top rushers

- KC – Larry Johnson – 7 rushes, 30 yards
- HOU – Wali Lundy – 9 rushes, 59 yards, TD

Top receivers

- KC – Chris Hannon – 1 reception, 44 yards
- HOU – Owen Daniels – 4 receptions, 29 yards

==== Week 2: at New York Giants ====
Week 2: Kansas City Chiefs at New York Giants – Game summary

Quarter	1	2	3	4	Total
Chiefs	0	0	0	0	0
Giants	7	7	3	0	17

at Giants Stadium, East Rutherford, New Jersey

- Date: August 17
- Game time: 8:00 p.m. EDT/7:00 p.m. CDT
- Game weather: Clear, 79 °F (26 °C)
- Game attendance: 76,316
- Referee: Jeff Triplette
- Recap, Game Book

Game information

First quarter

- NYG – Amani Toomer 5-yard pass from Eli Manning (Jay Feely kick), 8:46. Giants 7–0. Drive: 9 plays, 60 yards, 4:06.

Second quarter

- NYG – Brandon Jacobs 1-yard run (Jay Feely kick), 9:23. Giantx 14–0. Drive: 8 plays, 52 yards, 3:26.

Third quarter

- NYG – Jay Feely 31-yard field goal, 0:00. Giants 17–0. Drive: 13 plays, 65 yards, 6:42.

Fourth quarter

- No scoring plays.

Top passers

- KC – Casey Printers – 5/10, 33 yards
- NYG – Eli Manning – 11/14, 80 yards, TD

Top rushers

- KC – Dee Brown – 4 rushes, 15 yards
- NYG – Brandon Jacobs – 9 rushes, 40 yards, TD

Top receivers

- KC – Kris Wilson – 2 receptions, 16 yards
- NYG – Michael Jennings – 3 receptions, 24 yards

==== Week 3: vs. St. Louis Rams ====
Week 3: St. Louis Rams at Kansas City Chiefs – Game summary

Quarter	1	2	3	4	Total
Rams	3	0	6	3	12
Chiefs	7	9	0	0	16

at Arrowhead Stadium, Kansas City, Missouri

- Date: August 26
- Game time: 7:30 p.m. CDT
- Game weather: Overcast, 80 °F (27 °C)
- Game attendance: 74,741
- Referee: Bill Carollo
- Recap, Game Book

Game information

First quarter

- KC – Larry Johnson 2-yard run (Lawrence Tynes kick), 7:46. Chiefs 7–0. Drive: 14 plays, 64 yards, 7:14.
- STL – Jeff Wilkins 48-yard field goal, 2:29. Chiefs 7–3. Drive: 11 plays, 40 yards, 5:17.

Second quarter

- KC – Lawrence Tynes 28-yard field goal, 10:33. Chiefs 10–3. Drive: 15 plays, 77 yards, 6:56.
- KC – Lawrence Tynes 41-yard field goal, 5:25. Chiefs 13–3. Drive: 8 plays, 53 yards, 3:32.
- KC – Lawrence Tynes 50-yard field goal, 0:01. Chiefs 16–3. Drive: 3 plays, –5 yards, 0:23.

Third quarter

- STL – Jerome Collins 54-yard pass from Gus Frerotte (kick failed, hit right upright), 1:09. Chiefs 16–9. Drive: 2 plays, 60 yards, 0:43.

Fourth quarter

- STL – Remy Hamilton 47-yard field goal, 11:49. Chiefs 16–12. Drive: 8 plays, 31 yards, 3:11.

Top passers

- STL – Gus Frerotte – 11/18, 135 yards, TD
- KC – Trent Green – 8/12, 100 yards

Top rushers

- STL – Tony Fisher – 13 rushes, 36 yards
- KC – Michael Bennett – 13 rushes, 39 yards

Top receivers

- STL – Jerome Collins – 1 reception, 54 yards, TD
- KC – Eddie Kennison – 5 receptions, 52 yards

==== Week 4: vs. New Orleans Saints ====
Week 4: New Orleans Saints at Kansas City Chiefs – Game summary

Quarter	1	2	3	4	Total
Saints	0	0	3	6	9
Chiefs	0	3	0	7	10

at Arrowhead Stadium, Kansas City, Missouri

- Date: August 31
- Game time: 7:30 p.m. CDT
- Game weather: Partly cloudy, 77 °F (25 °C)
- Game attendance: 70,456
- Referee: Tony Corrente
- Recap, Game Book

Game information

First quarter

- No scoring plays.

Second quarter

- KC – Lawrence Tynes 27-yard field goal, 7:45. Chiefs 3–0. Drive: 10 plays, 69 yards, 4:43.

Third quarter

- NO – John Carney 46-yard field goal, 9:57. Tied 3–3. Drive: 12 plays, 38 yards, 5:03.

Fourth quarter

- KC – Jonathan Smith 1-yard run (Lawrence Tynes kick), 14:56. Chiefs 10–3. Drive: 10 plays, 55 yards, 5:03.
- NO – Jamaal Branch 1-yard run (pass failed), 2:04. Chiefs 10–9. Drive: 6 plays, 54 yards, 2:08.

Top passers

- NO – Jamie Martin – 11/14, 98 yards
- KC – Damon Huard – 6/9, 66 yards

Top rushers

- NO – Jamaal Branch – 14 rushes, 51 yards, TD
- KC – Jonathan Smith – 12 rushes, 51 yards, TD

Top receivers

- NO – Devery Henderson – 5 receptions, 51 yards
- KC – Jeff Webb – 3 receptions, 60 yards

== Regular season ==
=== Schedule ===
Week	Date	Opponent	Result	Record	Venue	Recap
1	September 10	Cincinnati Bengals	**L** 10–23	0–1	Arrowhead Stadium	Recap
2	September 17	at **Denver Broncos**	**L** 6–9 (OT)	0–2	Invesco Field at Mile High	Recap
3	Bye					
4	October 1	San Francisco 49ers	**W** 41–0	1–2	Arrowhead Stadium	Recap
5	October 8	at Arizona Cardinals	**W** 23–20	2–2	University of Phoenix Stadium	Recap
6	October 15	at Pittsburgh Steelers	**L** 7–45	2–3	Heinz Field	Recap
7	October 22	**San Diego Chargers**	**W** 30–27	3–3	Arrowhead Stadium	Recap
8	October 29	Seattle Seahawks	**W** 35–28	4–3	Arrowhead Stadium	Recap
9	November 5	at St. Louis Rams	**W** 31–17	5–3	Edward Jones Dome	Recap
10	November 12	at Miami Dolphins	**L** 10–13	5–4	Dolphin Stadium	Recap
11	November 19	**Oakland Raiders**	**W** 17–13	6–4	Arrowhead Stadium	Recap
12	November 23	**Denver Broncos**	**W** 19–10	7–4	Arrowhead Stadium	Recap
13	December 3	at Cleveland Browns	**L** 28–31 (OT)	7–5	Cleveland Browns Stadium	Recap
14	December 10	Baltimore Ravens	**L** 10–20	7–6	Arrowhead Stadium	Recap
15	December 17	at **San Diego Chargers**	**L** 9–20	7–7	Qualcomm Stadium	Recap
16	December 23	at **Oakland Raiders**	**W** 20–9	8–7	McAfee Coliseum	Recap
17	December 31	Jacksonville Jaguars	**W** 35–30	9–7	Arrowhead Stadium	Recap

Note: Intra-division opponents are in bold text.

=== Game summaries ===
==== Week 1: vs. Cincinnati Bengals ====
Week 1: Cincinnati Bengals at Kansas City Chiefs – Game summary

Quarter	1	2	3	4	Total
**Bengals**	0	17	0	6	**23**
Chiefs	3	0	0	7	**10**

at Arrowhead Stadium, Kansas City, Missouri

- Date: September 10
- Game time: 12:00 p.m. CDT
- Game weather: Cloudy Rain, 67 °F (19 °C)
- Game attendance: 77,956
- Referee: Larry Nemmers
- TV announcers (CBS): Gus Johnson and Randy Cross
- Recap, Game Book

Game information

**First quarter**

- KC – Lawrence Tynes 29-yard field goal, 3:05. Chiefs 3–0. **Drive: 11 plays, 67 yards, 6:18.**

**Second quarter**

- CIN – Shayne Graham 37-yard field goal, 14:53. Tied 3–3. **Drive: 4 plays, −5 yards, 1:07.**
- CIN – Rudi Johnson 22-yard run (Shayne Graham kick), 5:15. Bengals 10–3. **Drive: 11 plays, 88 yards, 5:03.**
- CIN – Kenny Watson 8-yard run (Shayne Graham kick), 1:05. Bengals 17–3. **Drive: 5 plays, 37 yards, 2:02.**

**Third quarter**

- No scoring plays.

**Fourth quarter**

- CIN – Shayne Graham 42-yard field goal, 11:35. Bengals 20–3. **Drive: 9 plays, 35 yards, 4:37.**
- KC – Tony Gonzalez 9-yard pass from Damon Huard (Lawrence Tynes kick), 3:52. Bengals 20–10. **Drive: 11 plays, 90 yards, 2:29.**
- CIN – Shayne Graham 36-yard field goal, 1:09. Bengals 23–10. **Drive: 4 plays, 1 yard, 1:40.**

**Top passers**

- CIN – Carson Palmer – 13/19, 127 yards
- KC – Damon Huard – 12/20, 140 yards, TD

**Top rushers**

- CIN – Rudi Johnson – 28 rushes, 96 yards, TD
- KC – Larry Johnson – 17 rushes, 68 yards

**Top receivers**

- CIN – Chad Johnson – 5 receptions, 48 yards
- KC – Tony Gonzalez – 10 receptions, 81 yards, TD

The Chiefs opened the regular season at home against the Cincinnati Bengals on September 10. The game was broadcast on CBS at noon Kansas City time.

The Chiefs' offense began at a slow pace, while their defense initially held the Bengals to a field goal within the first few minutes. The Bengals began to rip through the Chiefs' defense with the help of Rudi Johnson, who would later go on to rush for 96 yards and a touchdown.

In the third quarter, quarterback Trent Green received a concussion when he slid past the first-down marker and was hit by Robert Geathers' shoulder. Green laid motionless for eleven minutes until he was taken off the field by a stretcher. The mood of the game changed instantly when the Chiefs lost their leader, and many fans began to leave Arrowhead Stadium due to heavy rain and the dwindling score.

Back-up quarterback Damon Huard came into the game and completed 12 of 20 passes for 140 yards and a touchdown, and was sacked four times. Tight end Tony Gonzalez caught his first touchdown pass of the season and helped bring the score to 20–10. The Bengals left with their first win of the 2006 season as the Chiefs began their season 0–1.

==== Week 2: at Denver Broncos ====
Week 2: Kansas City Chiefs at Denver Broncos – Game summary

Quarter	1	2	3	4	OT	Total
Chiefs	0	3	3	0	0	**6**
**Broncos**	0	0	3	3	3	**9**

at Invesco Field at Mile High, Denver, Colorado

- Date: September 17
- Game time: 3:15 p.m. CDT/2:15 p.m. MDT
- Game weather: Sunny, 61 °F (16 °C)
- Game attendance: 76,786
- Referee: Ron Winter
- TV announcers (CBS): Jim Nantz and Phil Simms
- Recap, Game Book

Game information

**First quarter**

- No scoring plays.

**Second quarter**

- KC – Lawrence Tynes 29-yard field goal, 0:05. Chiefs 3–0. **Drive: 9 plays, 55 yards, 3:01.**

**Third quarter**

- KC – Lawrence Tynes 45-yard field goal, 9:29. Chiefs 6–0. **Drive: 4 plays, 4 yards, 1:26.**
- DEN – Jason Elam 23-yard field goal, 0:54. Chiefs 6–3. **Drive: 12 plays, 57 yards, 5:34.**

**Fourth quarter**

- DEN – Jason Elam 25-yard field goal, 5:54. Tied 6–6. **Drive: 14 plays, 76 yards, 7:16.**

**Overtime**

- DEN – Jason Elam 39-yard field goal, 9:50. Broncos 9–6. **Drive: 9 plays, 63 yards, 5:10.**

**Top passers**

- KC – Damon Huard – 17/23, 133 yards
- DEN – Jake Plummer – 16/30, 173 yards, INT

**Top rushers**

- KC – Larry Johnson – 27 rushes, 126 yards
- DEN – Tatum Bell – 16 rushes, 69 yards

**Top receivers**

- KC – Larry Johnson – 5 receptions, 41 yards
- DEN – Javon Walker – 5 receptions, 79 yards

Heading into their second game of the season and first on the road, the Chiefs looked to backup quarterback Damon Huard to lead their first win of the season. The game marked the first time the Herman Edwards regime played against the Denver Broncos, as Kansas City had not won in Denver since 2000. The game was broadcast on CBS at 2:15pm Denver time.

The game was the first time the Chiefs and Broncos played with no touchdowns scored by either team. The Kansas City defense held the Broncos scoreless in the first half, and to only nine points by the end of the game; the fewest the Chiefs have permitted at Denver since registering a 21–7 win on October 22, 1995. It also marked the fewest points Denver scored at INVESCO Field since it opened in 2001.

Punter Dustin Colquitt tied a career-high with six punts and established a career-high with 281 punting yards. Two costly fumbles by Damon Huard and one by Larry Johnson in the red zone resulted in the tied game going into overtime. The Broncos won the toss and set up for the game winning kick by Jason Elam.

With the loss, the Chiefs entered their bye week 0–2.

==== Week 3: Bye Week ====
The Chiefs took a week off, using the time to help Trent Green recover from his injury and developing Damon Huard and Brodie Croyle familiarity with their offensive playbook.

==== Week 4: vs. San Francisco 49ers ====
Week 4: San Francisco 49ers at Kansas City Chiefs – Game summary

Quarter	1	2	3	4	Total
49ers	0	0	0	0	**0**
**Chiefs**	10	14	3	14	**41**

at Arrowhead Stadium, Kansas City, Missouri

- Date: October 1
- Game time: 12:00 p.m. CDT
- Game weather: Sunny, 82 °F (28 °C)
- Game attendance: 77,609
- Referee: Walt Anderson
- TV announcers (Fox): Chris Myers, J. C. Pearson, and Jay Glazer
- Recap, Game Book

Game information

**First quarter**

- KC – Dante Hall 13-yard pass from Damon Huard (Lawrence Tynes kick), 8:55. Chiefs 7–0. **Drive: 10 plays, 73 yards, 6:05.**
- KC – Lawrence Tynes 22-yard field goal, 4:08. Chiefs 10–0. **Drive: 7 plays, 21 yards, 2:34.**

**Second quarter**

- KC – Larry Johnson 1-yard run (Lawrence Tynes kick), 5:16. Chiefs 17–0. **Drive: 8 plays, 62 yards, 4:36.**
- KC – Eddie Kennison 34-yard pass from Damon Huard (Lawrence Tynes kick), 3:05. Chiefs 24–0. **Drive: 1 play, 34 yards, 0:06.**

**Third quarter**

- KC – Lawrence Tynes 49-yard field goal, 11:47. Chiefs 27–0. **Drive: 6 plays, 20 yards, 3:02.**

**Fourth quarter**

- KC – Larry Johnson 2-yard run (Lawrence Tynes kick), 14:20. Chiefs 34–0. **Drive: 8 plays, 50 yards, 3:21.**
- KC – Dante Hall 60-yard punt return (Lawrence Tynes kick), 5:39. Chiefs 41–0.

**Top passers**

- SF – Alex Smith – 13/25, 92 yards, 2 INT
- KC – Damon Huard – 18/23, 208 yards, 2 TD

**Top rushers**

- SF – Frank Gore – 14 rushes, 65 yards
- KC – Larry Johnson – 30 rushes, 101 yards, 2 TD

**Top receivers**

- SF – Arnaz Battle – 3 receptions, 34 yards
- KC – Eddie Kennison – 6 receptions, 86 yards, TD

On October 1, the Chiefs hosted the San Francisco 49ers at Arrowhead Stadium. Coach Herman Edwards confirmed Trent Green would not play in the game. The game was broadcast on Fox at noon Kansas City time.

The Chiefs defense shut out the 49ers high scoring offense, forcing two interceptions and three forced fumbles. Quarterback Alex Smith was held to 92 yards passing and the 49ers to 93 yards rushing. In their first three games, the 49ers had given up only four sacks, but against the Chiefs, they allowed five total sacks.

Quarterback Damon Huard completed 18 of 23 passes for 208 yards and two passing touchdowns. While compiling a 133.3 passer rating – 158.3 is perfect – Huard was hardly ever touched or even hurried by a San Francisco defense which had rung up 12 sacks in its first three games. The game marked the first shutout for the Chiefs defense since December 1, 2002, and the 49ers their first shutout since 2004 and only their second since 1977.

With the win, the Chiefs improved to 1–2.

==== Week 5: at Arizona Cardinals ====
Week 5: Kansas City Chiefs at Arizona Cardinals – Game summary

Quarter	1	2	3	4	Total
**Chiefs**	0	10	0	13	**23**
Cardinals	14	3	3	0	**20**

at University of Phoenix Stadium, Glendale, Arizona

- Date: October 8
- Game time: 3:05 p.m. CDT/1:05 p.m. MST
- Game weather: None (retractable roof closed)
- Game attendance: 63,445
- Referee: Terry McAulay
- TV announcers (CBS): Ian Eagle and Solomon Wilcots
- Recap, Game Book

Game information

**First quarter**

- ARI – Anquan Boldin 49-yard pass from Matt Leinart (Neil Rackers kick), 12:19. Cardinals 7–0. **Drive: 5 plays, 60 yards, 2:41.**
- ARI – Larry Fitzgerald 5-yard pass from Matt Leinart (Neil Rackers kick), 6:12. Cardinals 14–0. **Drive: 5 plays, 60 yards, 2:41.**

**Second quarter**

- KC – Lawrence Tynes 45-yard field goal, 12:01. Cardinals 14–3. **Drive: 8 plays, 25 yards, 3:48.**
- KC – Larry Johnson 9-yard pass from Damon Huard (Lawrence Tynes kick), 3:26. Cardinals 14–10. **Drive: 3 plays, 6 yards, 0:57.**
- ARI – Neil Rackers 41-yard field goal, 0:42. Cardinals 17–10. **Drive: 4 plays, 9 yards, 0:50.**

**Third quarter**

- ARI – Neil Rackers 45-yard field goal, 10:06. Cardinals 20–10. **Drive: 6 plays, 42 yards, 3:31.**

**Fourth quarter**

- KC – Samie Parker 15-yard pass from Damon Huard (Lawrence Tynes kick), 9:35. Cardinals 20–17. **Drive: 7 plays, 66 yards, 4:04.**
- KC – Lawrence Tynes 40-yard field goal, 5:06. Tied 20–20. **Drive: 4 plays, 0 yards, 0:47.**
- KC – Lawrence Tynes 19-yard field goal, 1:36. Chiefs 23–20. **Drive: 5 plays, 85 yards, 0:55.**

**Top passers**

- KC – Damon Huard – 26/38, 288 yards, 2 TD
- ARI – Matt Leinart – 22/35, 253 yards, 2 TD, INT

**Top rushers**

- KC – Larry Johnson – 16 rushes, 36 yards
- ARI – Edgerrin James – 24 rushes, 71 yards

**Top receivers**

- KC – Larry Johnson – 6 receptions, 106 yards, TD
- ARI – Bryant Johnson – 6 receptions, 82 yards

On October 8, the Chiefs traveled to Glendale, Arizona for their first game in the University of Phoenix Stadium to face the Arizona Cardinals. Trent Green was still recovering from his concussion, and Arizona's rookie quarterback Matt Leinart made his career start. The game was broadcast on CBS 1:05pm Arizona time.

The game began with Arizona's offense dominating and catching the Chiefs' defense off-guard with a 49-yard touchdown pass to Wide receiver Anquan Boldin, putting the Cardinals on the scoreboard within three minutes of the game.

On the opening kickoff, Dante Hall was injured and left the game, leaving rookie Jeff Webb to return the kicks for the rest of the game, including a 56-yard punt return. Samie Parker caught a 15-yard touchdown pass, leaving the Chiefs within three points of the Cardinals (17–20). The play was officially reviewed as the referees initially thought Parker caught the ball out of bounds, but the referees decided it was caught in the endzone.

Damon Huard threw Larry Johnson a 78-yard screen pass that would be stopped short of a touchdown when Antrel Rolle twisted Johnson's neck by grabbing his facemask, sending him to the turf motionless for 2 minutes. Johnson recovered and received a standing ovation. The NFL fined Rolle $12,500 for his penalty. It was the second time in the 2006 season in which Rolle had been fined for an illegal tackle. The play set up Lawrence Tynes’ eventual game-winning field goal, leaving the Chiefs with the 23–20 lead.

Neil Rackers set up for a kick with less than 15 seconds to play in order to send the 23–20 contest into overtime. Rackers missed the uprights by a foot with seconds left in the game.

With the win, the Chiefs improved to 2–2.

==== Week 6: at Pittsburgh Steelers ====
Week 6: Kansas City Chiefs at Pittsburgh Steelers – Game summary

Quarter	1	2	3	4	Total
Chiefs	0	0	7	0	**7**
**Steelers**	14	17	0	14	**45**

at Heinz Field, Pittsburgh, Pennsylvania

- Date: October 15
- Game time: 4:15 p.m. EDT/3:15 p.m. CDT
- Game weather: Clear, 52 °F (11 °C)
- Game attendance: 64,727
- Referee: Scott Green
- TV announcers (CBS): Greg Gumbel and Dan Dierdorf
- Recap, Game Book

Game information

**First quarter**

- PIT – Willie Parker 3-yard run (Jeff Reed kick), 10:45. Steelers 7–0. **Drive: 7 plays, 73 yards, 4:15.**
- PIT – Nate Washington 47-yard pass from Ben Roethlisberger (Jeff Reed kick), 0:50. Steelers 14–0. **Drive: 2 plays, 58 yards, 0:45.**

**Second quarter**

- PIT – Willie Parker 8-yard run (Jeff Reed kick), 9:31. Steelers 21–0. **Drive: 9 plays, 80 yards, 5:15.**
- PIT – Hines Ward 13-yard pass from Ben Roethlisberger (Jeff Reed kick), 6:20. Steelers 28–0. **Drive: 3 plays, 65 yards, 1:32.**
- PIT – Jeff Reed 32-yard field goal, 0:00. Steelers 31–0. **Drive: 12 plays, 76 yards, 4:12.**

**Third quarter**

- KC – Larry Johnson 2-yard run (Lawrence Tynes kick), 6:00. Steelers 31–7. **Drive: 11 plays, 80 yards, 4:21.**

**Fourth quarter**

- PIT – Najeh Davenport 1-yard run (Jeff Reed kick), 12:40. Steelers 38–7. **Drive: 13 plays, 62 yards, 8:20.**
- PIT – Rian Wallace 30-yard interception return (Jeff Reed kick), 3:31. Steelers 45–7.

**Top passers**

- KC – Damon Huard – 16/32, 162 yards, INT
- PIT – Ben Roethlisberger – 16/19, 238 yards, 2 TD

**Top rushers**

- KC – Larry Johnson – 15 rushes, 26 yards, TD
- PIT – Willie Parker – 21 rushes, 109 yards, 2 TD

**Top receivers**

- KC – Samie Parker – 5 receptions, 72 yards
- PIT – Nate Washington – 3 receptions, 68 yards, TD

On October 15, the Chiefs traveled to Heinz Field to battle the defending Super Bowl champion Pittsburgh Steelers. The Chiefs entered the game 2–2 for the season, while the Steelers were 1–3 with a three-game losing streak. The game was broadcast on CBS 4:15 p.m. Pittsburgh time.

Trent Green would sit out for the fourth straight week. Damon Huard would make his fourth consecutive start as he entered the game ranked second in the NFL in quarterback ratings, while the Chiefs defense ranked in the top five in the NFL. Larry Johnson recovered from his facemask tackle from Antrel Rolle and started as running back.

Ben Roethlisberger threw his first touchdown of the season as the Chiefs defense gave up 372 total yards in the first half, allowing 17 first downs. Cornerback Ty Law made a costly error in the opening series by slipping on the turf, allowing Santonio Holmes to gain 50 yards on the third play of the game. Holmes would have scored if he had not slipped as well.

The Chiefs managed one touchdown in the game, coming from Larry Johnson in the third quarter. Following a 49-yard interception by safety Troy Polamalu, Larry Johnson stopped Polamalu by tackling him from his long hair. Johnson was not penalized for pulling Polamalu down, but by pulling him back up by his hair (a 15-yard penalty for unsportsmanlike conduct).

The Chiefs put in rookie quarterback Brodie Croyle in the final quarter, who managed an interception for a touchdown and a sack, as the Steelers ended the game with the 45–7 victory margin.

With the loss, the Chiefs fell to 2–3.

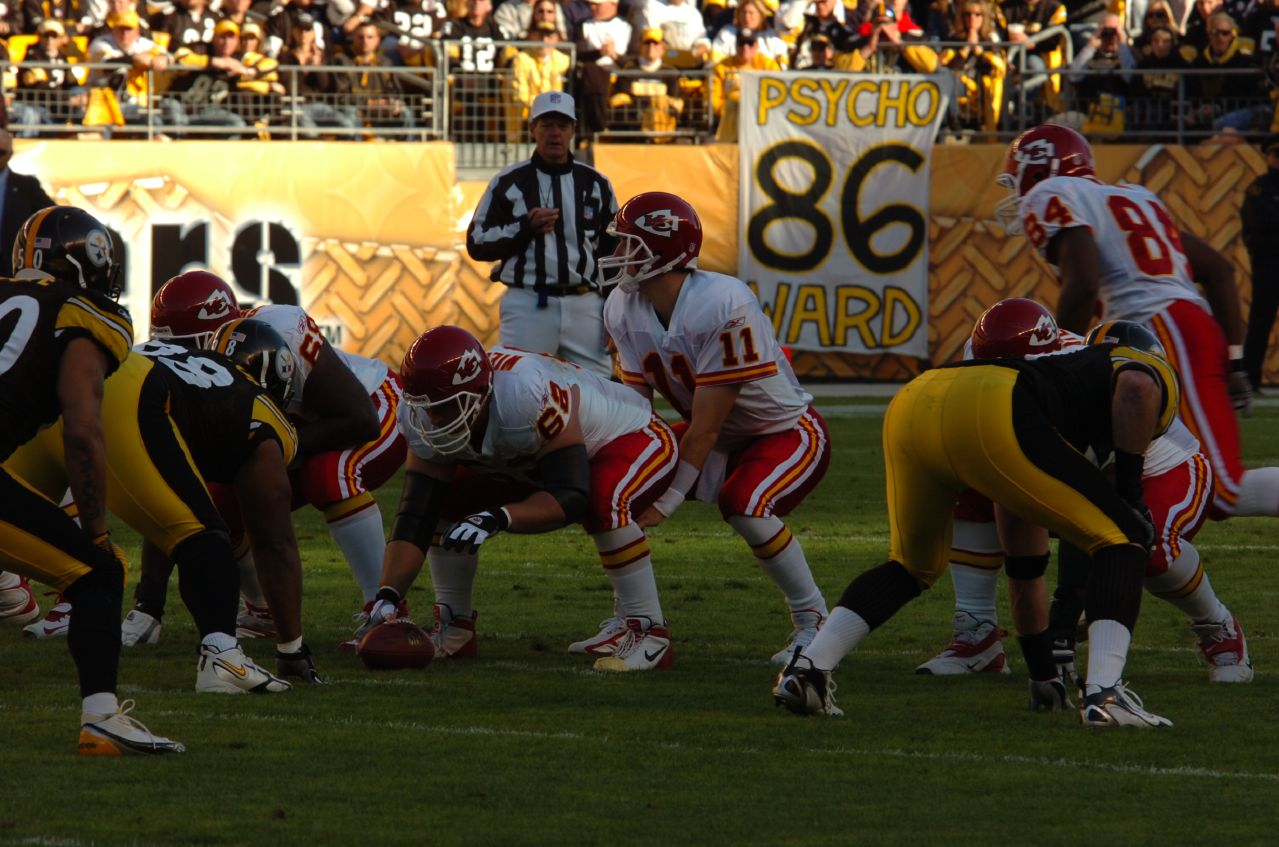
Damon Huard's poor performance led to Brodie Croyle's substitution against Pittsburgh

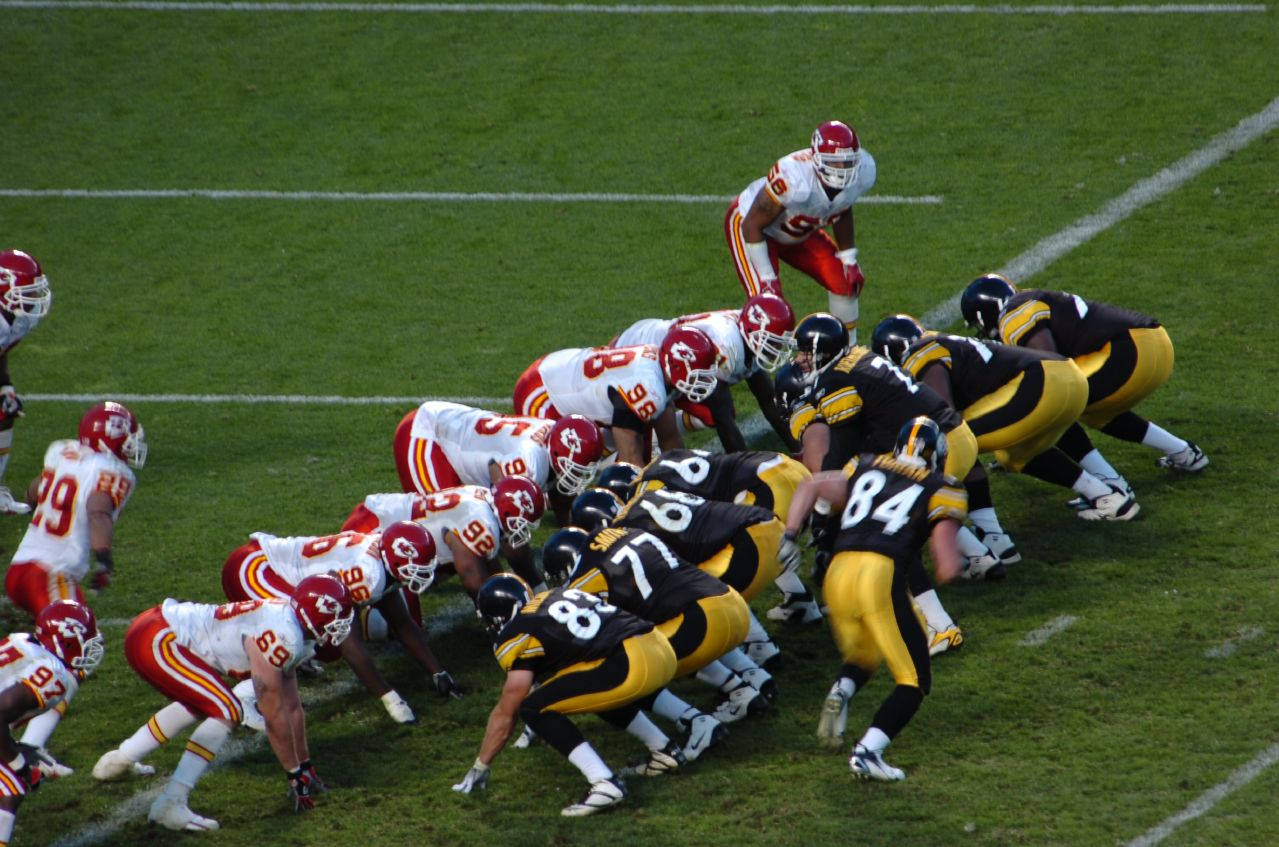
Pittsburgh approaches the Chiefs' goal line

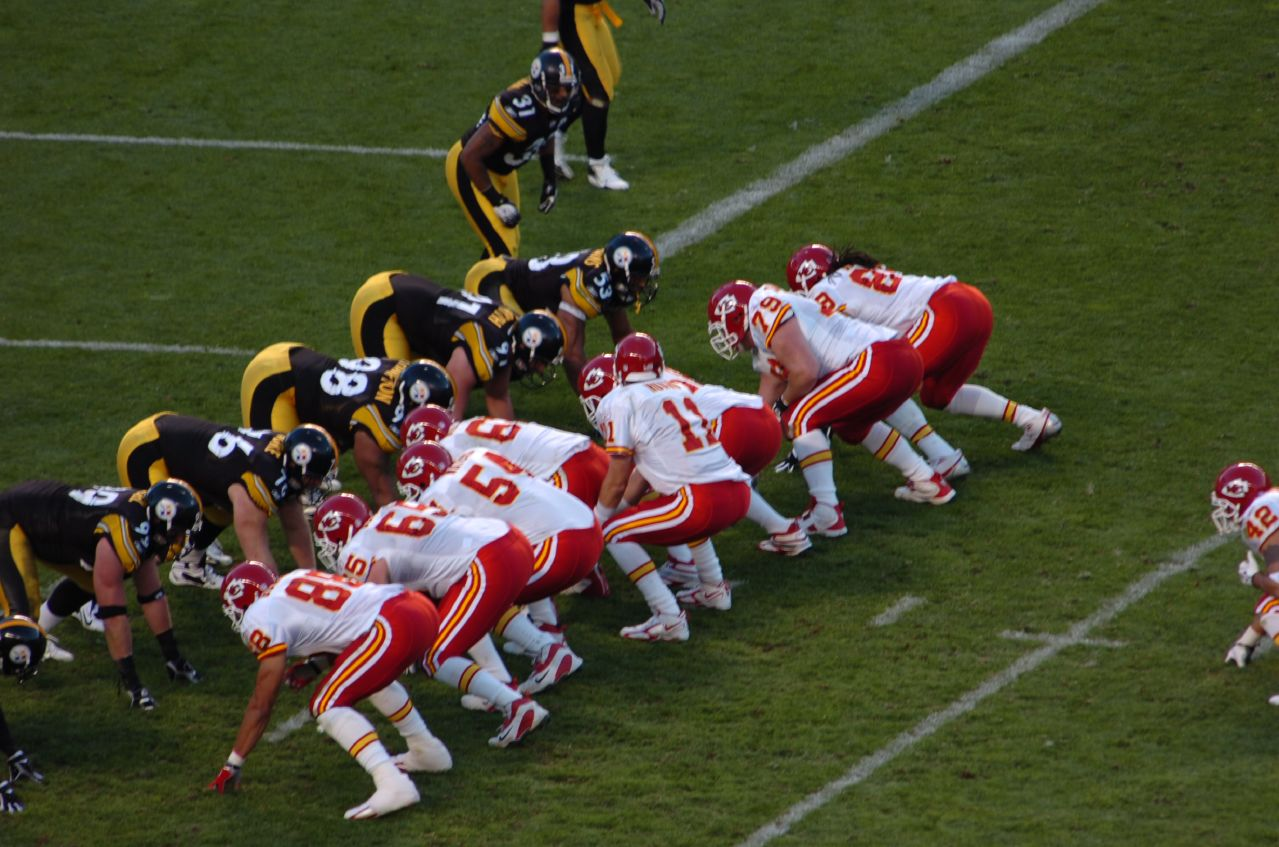
An identical play with the Chiefs on offense

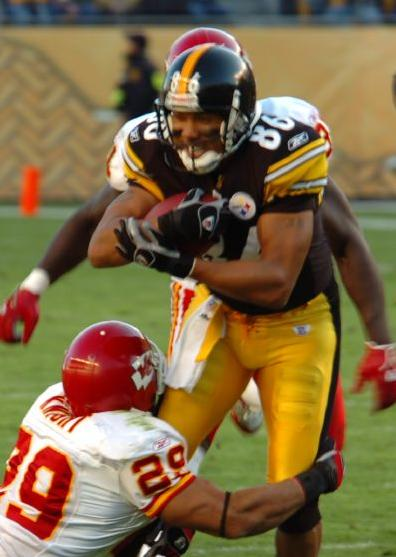
The Chiefs defense takes on running back Hines Ward

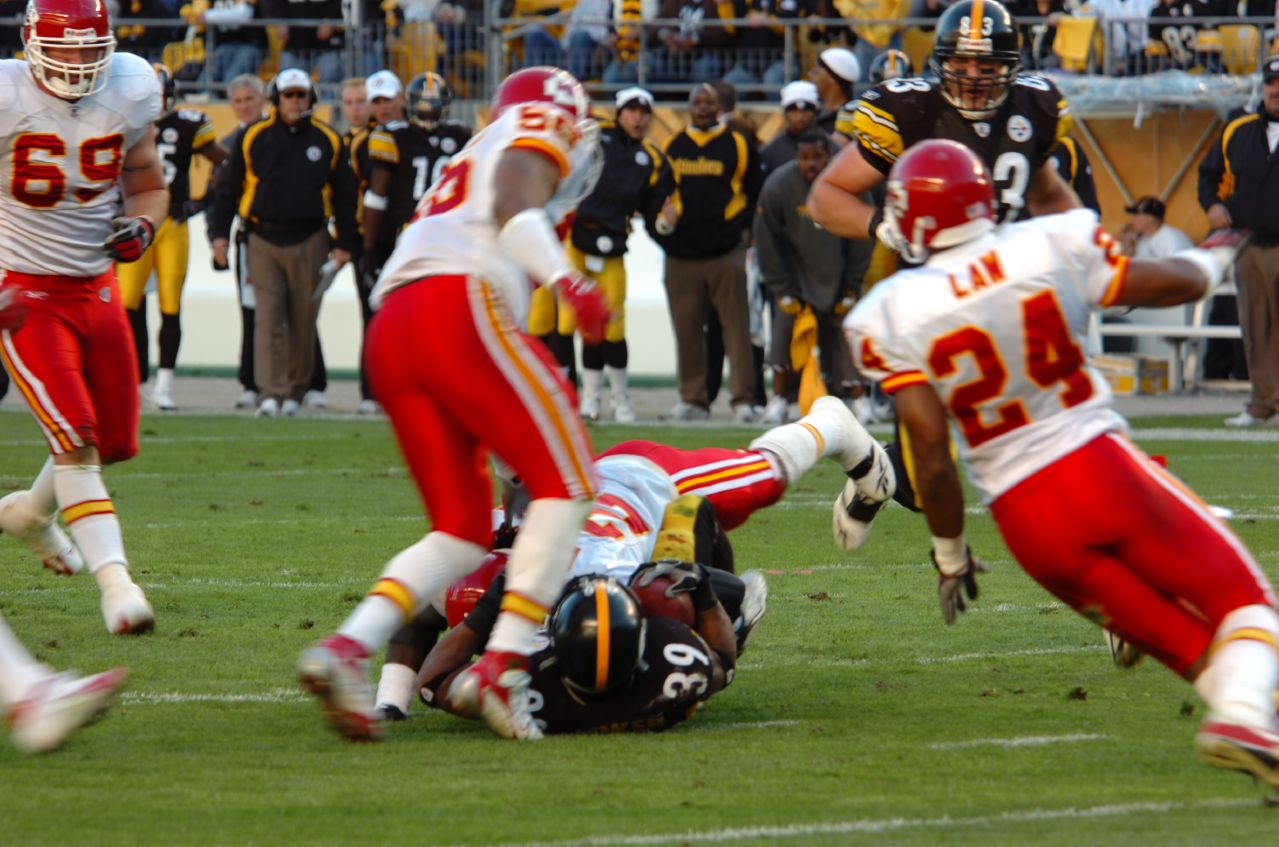
Willie Parker is tackled by the Chiefs

==== Week 7: vs. San Diego Chargers ====
Week 7: San Diego Chargers at Kansas City Chiefs – Game summary

Quarter	1	2	3	4	Total
Chargers	0	6	7	14	**27**
**Chiefs**	14	6	7	3	**30**

at Arrowhead Stadium, Kansas City, Missouri

- Date: October 22
- Game time: 12:00 p.m. CDT
- Game weather: Partly cloudy, 40 °F (4 °C)
- Game attendance: 77,752
- Referee: Bill Leavy
- TV announcers (CBS): Kevin Harlan and Rich Gannon
- Recap, Game Book

Game information

**First quarter**

- KC – Kris Wilson 11-yard pass from Damon Huard (Lawrence Tynes kick), 6:21. Chiefs 7–0. **Drive: 1 play, 11 yards, 0:04.**
- KC – Eddie Kennison 21-yard pass from Damon Huard (Lawrence Tynes kick), 3:17. Chiefs 14–0. **Drive: 3 plays, 32 yards, 0:51.**

**Second quarter**

- SD – Nate Kaeding 39-yard field goal, 14:52. Chiefs 14–3. **Drive: 8 plays, 44 yards, 3:25.**
- KC – Larry Johnson 11-yard run (kick failed, hit right upright), 11:06. Chiefs 20–3. **Drive: 6 plays, 73 yards, 3:46.**
- SD – Nate Kaeding 31-yard field goal, 4:22. Chiefs 20–6. **Drive: 12 plays, 67 yards, 6:44.**

**Third quarter**

- SD – Antonio Gates 1-yard pass from Philip Rivers (Nate Kaeding kick), 9:29. Chiefs 20–13. **Drive: 7 plays, 30 yards, 3:42.**
- KC – Larry Johnson 1-yard run (Lawrence Tynes kick), 11:06. Chiefs 27–13. **Drive: 14 plays, 89 yards, 7:57.**

**Fourth quarter**

- SD – LaDainian Tomlinson 37-yard pass from Philip Rivers (Nate Kaeding kick), 13:16. Chiefs 27–20. **Drive: 7 plays, 66 yards, 3:16.**
- SD – Brandon Manumaleuna 1-yard pass from LaDainian Tomlinson (Nate Kaeding kick), 5:10. Tied 27–27. **Drive: 5 plays, 23 yards, 2:26.**
- KC – Lawrence Tynes 53-yard field goal, 0:06. Chiefs 30–27. **Drive: 4 plays, 47 yards, 0:27.**

**Top passers**

- SD – Philip Rivers – 25/43, 266 yards, 2 TD, INT
- KC – Damon Huard – 15/27, 232 yards, 2 TD

**Top rushers**

- SD – LaDainian Tomlinson – 15 rushes, 66 yards
- KC – Larry Johnson – 28 rushes, 132 yards, 2 TD

**Top receivers**

- SD – LaDainian Tomlinson – 6 receptions, 72 yards, TD
- KC – Tony Gonzalez – 6 receptions, 138 yards

On October 22, the Chiefs returned to Arrowhead to face division rivals, the San Diego Chargers. The game was broadcast on CBS at noon Kansas City time.

Trent Green had been ruled out to start in the game, but has been cleared by doctors to begin practicing with the squad. Ronnie Cruz, the Chiefs' only fullback, is out for the year following an unspecified knee injury. Tight end Kris Wilson took over for Cruz. The Chiefs also signed fullback Greg Hanoian in the days before the game to add depth to the position.

The game started with the Chiefs forcing turnovers on San Diego's first four possessions. Damon Huard later converted turnovers with two touchdown passes. Jared Allen forced a fumble from quarterback Philip Rivers, recovered by Tamba Hali. The Chiefs took advantage of the turnover by scoring a touchdown with Eddie Kennison, making the lead 14–0. The Chargers would kick a field goal and the Chiefs would respond with a 15-yard field goal extending the lead to 20–3. The Chargers would not go into halftime with a 17-point deficit, so they kicked another field goal with 5 minutes to halftime.

The game was tied for the rest of the fourth quarter until 33 seconds remained when Damon Huard led the Chiefs to a 52-yard gain with 3 passes—two of them to Tony Gonzalez for 37 yards. The gain by Gonzalez set up for a game-winning field goal by kicker Lawrence Tynes. With 11 seconds left in the game, with the Chiefs trying to avoid overtime, Tynes connected on a career long 53-yard kick which later gave the Chiefs the victory, 30–27.

With the win, the Chiefs improved to 3–3.

==== Week 8: vs. Seattle Seahawks ====
Week 8: Seattle Seahawks at Kansas City Chiefs – Game summary

Quarter	1	2	3	4	Total
Seahawks	7	7	7	7	**28**
**Chiefs**	10	10	7	8	**35**

at Arrowhead Stadium, Kansas City, Missouri

- Date: October 29
- Game time: 12:00 p.m. CST
- Game weather: Clear, 67 °F (19 °C)
- Game attendance: 77,645
- Referee: Pete Morelli
- TV announcers (Fox): Matt Vasgersian, JC Pearson and Jay Glazer
- Recap, Game Book

Game information

**First quarter**

- KC – Lawrence Tynes 38-yard field goal, 12:05. Chiefs 3–0. **Drive: 8 plays, 55 yards, 2:55.**
- SEA – D. J. Hackett 8-yard pass from Seneca Wallace (Josh Brown kick), 5:11. Seahawks 7–3. **Drive: 3 plays, 7 yards, 0:55.**
- KC – Larry Johnson 3-yard run (Lawrence Tynes kick), 0:25. Chiefs 10–7. **Drive: 8 plays, 74 yards, 4:46.**

**Second quarter**

- KC – Lawrence Tynes 32-yard field goal, 8:31. Chiefs 13–7. **Drive: 8 plays, 56 yards, 4:08.**
- SEA – Jerramy Stevens 2-yard pass from Seneca Wallace (Josh Brown kick), 4:55. Seahawks 14–13. **Drive: 8 plays, 71 yards, 3:36.**
- KC – Larry Johnson 9-yard pass from Damon Huard (Lawrence Tynes kick), 0:45. Chiefs 20–14. **Drive: 9 plays, 77 yards, 4:10.**

**Third quarter**

- KC – Larry Johnson 2-yard run (Lawrence Tynes kick), 6:22. Chiefs 27–14. **Drive: 13 plays, 88 yards, 6:51.**
- SEA – Kelly Herndon 61-yard fumble return (Josh Brown kick), 1:27. Chiefs 27–21.

**Fourth quarter**

- SEA – Darrell Jackson 49-yard pass from Seneca Wallace (Josh Brown kick), 6:30. Seahawks 28–27. **Drive: 4 plays, 60 yards, 0:37.**
- KC – Larry Johnson 3-yard run (Damon Huard–Tony Gonzalez pass), 2:15. Chiefs 35–28. **Drive: 8 plays, 80 yards, 4:15.**

**Top passers**

- SEA – Seneca Wallace – 15/30, 198 yards, 3 TD, 2 INT
- KC – Damon Huard – 17/25, 312 yards, TD

**Top rushers**

- SEA – Maurice Morris – 12 rushes, 25 yards
- KC – Larry Johnson – 39 rushes, 155 yards, 3 TD

**Top receivers**

- SEA – Darrell Jackson – 3 receptions, 64 yards, TD
- KC – Eddie Kennison – 6 receptions, 132 yards

On October 29, the Chiefs hosted the defending NFC champion and former division rival, the Seattle Seahawks. The game marked the first time the Seahawks had played at Arrowhead since joining the NFC. The game was broadcast on Fox at noon Kansas City time.

Trent Green had been cleared by doctors to practice again with the team, but he required a minimum of 2 more games to adjust to playing time. Backup quarterback Damon Huard was injured in the days before the game and was expected to miss the game, but he was declared fit to start. On the Chiefs radio coverage during the game, play-by-play announcer Mitch Holthus called the game "The Backup Bowl."

Offensive tackle John Welbourn practiced with the team, but it was not known if he will be welcomed back to the team following a suspension violating the league's steroid policy. He later came back after Week 8 after serving his suspension. The Chiefs also signed offensive tackle Chris Terry to a two-year contract. Previously, Terry had been suspended from the NFL for four games in 2003 for violation of the policies on substance abuse and personal conduct.

In the second quarter, the Chiefs' Lawrence Tynes connected on a 32-yard field goal adding to the Chiefs' lead 13–7. Quarterback Seneca Wallace responded to the Chiefs' lead by throwing to Wide receiver Deion Branch, who went out of bounds in front of the end zone. The Chiefs challenged the call as they believed Branch did not have possession while in bounds. Replays showed Branch caught the ball while in the air and while one foot landed in bounds, the other stepped on the line. The review booth was experiencing technical difficulties. so the referees declared the call stands.

The Chiefs' defense held the Seahawks for the remaining time in the fourth quarter after Jared Allen intercepted a tipped pass from Seneca Wallace. Allen had the ball stripped by Deion Branch near the Seattle 27-yard line. Seattle challenged Allen's possession as it was later seen that Branch recovered the ball before going out of bounds. The referees took nearly four minutes in reviewing the play, where new NFL rules claim that referees should take no longer than 90 seconds or else the play will stand. The call was reversed and Seattle regained possession with less than two minutes remaining and one timeout left.

In the last few moments in the game, Derrick Johnson managed to get the Chiefs' first sack on Seneca Wallace and the Chiefs' defense held the Seahawks to secure the win. With the win, the Chiefs climbed above .500 for the first time in the season.

With the win, the Chiefs improved to 4–3.

==== Week 9: at St. Louis Rams ====
Week 9: Kansas City Chiefs at St. Louis Rams – Game summary

Quarter	1	2	3	4	Total
**Chiefs**	7	17	0	7	**31**
Rams	0	10	7	0	**17**

at Edward Jones Dome, St. Louis, Missouri

- Date: November 5
- Game time: 12:00 p.m. CST
- Game weather: None (indoor stadium)
- Game attendance: 66,191
- Referee: Mike Carey
- TV announcers (CBS): Don Criqui and Steve Beuerlein
- Recap, Game Book

Game information

**First quarter**

- KC – Larry Johnson 1-yard run (Lawrence Tynes kick), 2:14. Chiefs 7–0. **Drive: 6 plays, 14 yards, 3:16.**

**Second quarter**

- KC – Tony Gonzalez 3-yard pass from Damon Huard (Lawrence Tynes kick), 12:33. Chiefs 14–0. **Drive: 2 plays, 46 yards, 0:50.**
- KC – Lawrence Tynes 42-yard field goal, 10:22. Chiefs 17–0. **Drive: 4 plays, 9 yards, 1:23.**
- STL – Steven Jackson 2-yard run (Jeff Wilkins kick), 7:01. Chiefs 17–7. **Drive: 6 plays, 70 yards, 3:21.**
- KC – Tony Gonzalez 25-yard pass from Damon Huard (Lawrence Tynes kick), 0:48. Chiefs 24–7. **Drive: 8 plays, 80 yards, 2:21.**
- STL – Jeff Wilkins 41-yard field goal, 0:00. Chiefs 24–10. **Drive: 7 plays, 58 yards, 0:48.**

**Third quarter**

- STL – Kevin Curtis 2-yard pass from Marc Bulger (Jeff Wilkins kick), 3:50. Chiefs 24–17. **Drive: 12 plays, 80 yards, 5:54.**

**Fourth quarter**

- KC – Kris Wilson 11-yard pass from Damon Huard (Lawrence Tynes kick), 6:20. Chiefs 31–17. **Drive: 7 plays, 94 yards, 3:40.**

**Top passers**

- KC – Damon Huard – 10/15, 148 yards, 3 TD
- STL – Marc Bulger – 31/42, 354 yards, TD

**Top rushers**

- KC – Larry Johnson – 27 rushes, 172 yards, TD
- STL – Steven Jackson – 19 rushes, 86 yards, TD

**Top receivers**

- KC – Tony Gonzalez – 5 receptions, 63 yards, 2 TD
- STL – Steven Jackson – 13 receptions, 133 yards

On November 5, the Chiefs traveled to the Edward Jones Dome to battle their intrastate and interleague rivals, the St. Louis Rams. The Chiefs were defending the Missouri Governor's Cup, in which both teams competed in the pre-season. The game was broadcast on CBS at noon St. Louis time.

Chiefs' running back Priest Holmes would meet with a neurosurgeon about his October 30 neck injury, suffered against the Chargers' Shawne Merriman. Holmes must practice by November 7 to be eligible to remain in the season. Trent Green suited up for the game against the Rams, but was listed as the third quarterback behind starter Damon Huard and rookie Brodie Croyle. Herm Edwards said there was no chance Green would play against the Rams, but could be back by week 10.

Damon Huard threw a 43-yard pass to Samie Parker which put the Chiefs in the red zone at the 3-yard line. Huard continued the drive with a 3-yard pass to Tony Gonzalez, his 58th career touchdown and the Chiefs' all-time record breaker for Tight ends. The Chiefs were leading with two and a half minutes into the game. Kansas City again used Larry Johnson's speed to their advantage as Johnson broke a 16-yard dash, setting up a field goal by Lawrence Tynes on fourth and one. An offensive battle ensued between the two teams before the half, as Tony Gonzalez scored his 59th career touchdown and second of the game from 25-yards out. The Rams failed to find the endzone, but Jeff Wilkins connected on a field goal to make the score 24–10 at the half.

Damon Huard fumbled on Kansas City's next offensive drive but was recovered by Kyle Turley—in his first game back from an injury. The Rams' defensive unit stopped the Chiefs from securing the lead. The Chiefs' defense gave up some major yardage on the Rams' next turn on offense. Penalties to St. Louis cost them over 60 yards, as the Chiefs' offense suffered a penalty for defensive pass interference from Dexter Coakley and a facemask to Larry Johnson from Oshiomogho Atogwe. The Chiefs would go on to secure the win with an 11-yard touchdown pass to Kris Wilson to make the score 31–17. The game ended as the clock ran out as the Chiefs retained the Governor's Cup and advanced to 5–3.

Several Chiefs players were injured throughout the game including Brian Waters, Tamba Hali, Derrick Johnson, Greg Wesley, Keyaron Fox and Kendall Gammon.

==== Week 10: at Miami Dolphins ====
Week 10: Kansas City Chiefs at Miami Dolphins – Game summary

Quarter	1	2	3	4	Total
Chiefs	0	0	0	10	**10**
**Dolphins**	3	10	0	0	**13**

at Dolphin Stadium, Miami Gardens, Florida

- Date: November 12
- Game time: 1:00 p.m. EST/12:00 p.m. CST
- Game weather: Partly cloudy, 81 °F (27 °C)
- Game attendance: 73,132
- Referee: Jerome Boger
- TV announcers (CBS): Gus Johnson and Steve Tasker
- Recap, Game Book

Game information

**First quarter**

- MIA – Olindo Mare 40-yard field goal, 7:04. Dolphins 3–0. **Drive: 13 plays, 58 yards, 5:58.**

**Second quarter**

- MIA – Olindo Mare 22-yard field goal, 11:17. Dolphins 6–0. **Drive: 12 plays, 44 yards, 5:36.**
- MIA – Ronnie Brown 1-yard run (Olindo Mare kick), 8:09. Dolphins 13–0. **Drive: 5 plays, 61 yards, 2:14.**

**Third quarter**

- No scoring plays.

**Fourth quarter**

- KC – Lawrence Tynes 27-yard field goal, 11:00. Dolphins 13–3. **Drive: 15 plays, 85 yards, 6:06.**
- KC – Larry Johnson 2-yard run (Lawrence Tynes kick), 7:14. Dolphins 13–10. **Drive: 4 plays, 2 yards, 0:57.**

**Top passers**

- KC – Damon Huard – 15/18, 201 yards
- MIA – Joey Harrington – 19/35, 201 yards

**Top rushers**

- KC – Larry Johnson – 18 rushes, 75 yards, TD
- MIA – Ronnie Brown – 25 rushes, 89 yards, TD

**Top receivers**

- KC – Tony Gonzalez – 6 receptions, 84 yards
- MIA – Chris Chambers – 3 receptions, 66 yards

On November 12, the Chiefs traveled to Dolphin Stadium to play the Miami Dolphins. The Chiefs entered the game with a three-game winning streak and the Dolphins entered with an upset victory over the previously undefeated Chicago Bears. The game was broadcast on CBS at 1pm Miami time.

In a November 7 press conference, Herm Edwards backed off on the subject of whether Trent Green will retain his starting role. On Election Day, Chiefs' fans were asked to vote for their choice of starting quarterback on The Kansas City Star's website. Damon Huard won the poll with 58%. The vote did not determine Edwards' decision, and was strictly for the fan's input.

Pro Bowler Brian Waters missed the game and several other Chiefs players—including Derrick Johnson and Greg Wesley—missed the game with their own injuries. Kansas City was 3-for-14 on third-down conversions and had the ball for only 24 minutes throughout the game.

The Chiefs were shut out by the end of the first half, the first time Miami had not allowed their opponents to score all season. After the second half, the Chiefs began to regain their ground. A fumble by Ronnie Brown gave Kansas City's Jared Allen 20-yards to recover and put the Chiefs in the red zone. Larry Johnson would finish the opportunity from the turnover and score from 2-yards out for a touchdown. The Chiefs now trailed 10–13 following an XPA by Lawrence Tynes.

The Chiefs regained the ball after a failed offensive drive by Miami with 3:10 left in the game. A costly sack by former Chiefs player Vonnie Holliday would put Damon Huard back within 5-yards of the end zone. The Chiefs would not be able to rally back from the 3-point deficit following an incomplete pass to Tony Gonzalez. The Dolphins ran the clock out for their third win of the season, and Kansas City's first loss in three games as the team fell to 5–4.

==== Week 11: vs. Oakland Raiders ====
Week 11: Oakland Raiders at Kansas City Chiefs – Game summary

Quarter	1	2	3	4	Total
Raiders	3	10	0	0	**13**
**Chiefs**	7	0	3	7	**17**

at Arrowhead Stadium, Kansas City, Missouri

- Date: November 19
- Game time: 12:00 p.m. CST
- Game weather: Clear, 41 °F (5 °C)
- Game attendance: 78,097
- Referee: Walt Anderson
- TV announcers (CBS): Kevin Harlan and Rich Gannon
- Recap, Game Book

Game information

**First quarter**

- KC – Larry Johnson 5-yard run (Lawrence Tynes kick), 6:19. Chiefs 7–0. **Drive: 11 plays, 76 yards, 6:14.**
- OAK – Sebastian Janikowski 41-yard field goal, 0:22. Chiefs 7–3. **Drive: 11 plays, 41 yards, 5:57.**

**Second quarter**

- OAK – Sebastian Janikowski 36-yard field goal, 7:53. Chiefs 7–6. **Drive: 11 plays, 49 yards, 6:15.**
- OAK – Courtney Anderson 2-yard pass from Aaron Brooks (Sebastian Janikowski kick), 0:19. Raiders 13–7. **Drive: 11 plays, 76 yards, 6:05.**

**Third quarter**

- KC – Lawrence Tynes 37-yard field goal, 2:43. Raiders 13–10. **Drive: 7 plays, 46 yards, 3:32.**

**Fourth quarter**

- KC – Larry Johnson 1-yard run (Lawrence Tynes kick), 1:32. Chiefs 17–13. **Drive: 11 plays, 80 yards, 3:21.**

**Top passers**

- OAK – Aaron Brooks – 13/22, 179 yards, TD, INT
- KC – Damon Huard – 9/16, 102 yards

**Top rushers**

- OAK – Justin Fargas – 19 rushes, 52 yards
- KC – Larry Johnson – 31 rushes, 154 yards, 2 TD

**Top receivers**

- OAK – Ronald Curry – 5 receptions, 85 yards
- KC – Samie Parker – 3 receptions, 44 yards

On November 19, the Chiefs began a short week by facing their historic division rivals, the Oakland Raiders, and prepared for another home game just four days later against the Denver Broncos. The game was broadcast on CBS at noon CST.

Tight end Tony Gonzalez missed the game because of a sprained shoulder from week 10, and at the time his status for the Thanksgiving game was unknown. Brian Waters and Kevin Sampson will also miss the game, and Derrick Johnson and Greg Wesley are questionable to start.

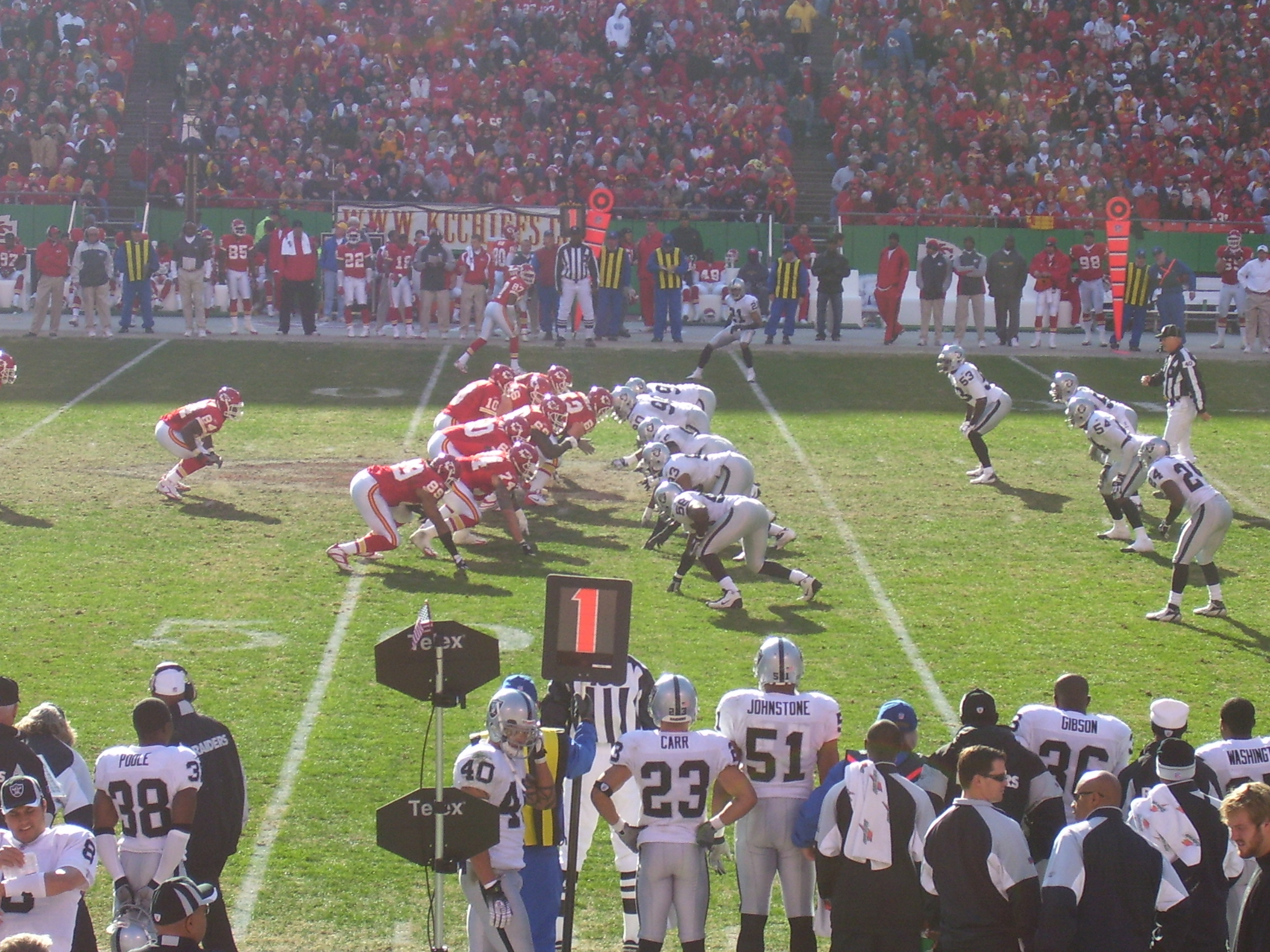
The game in week 11

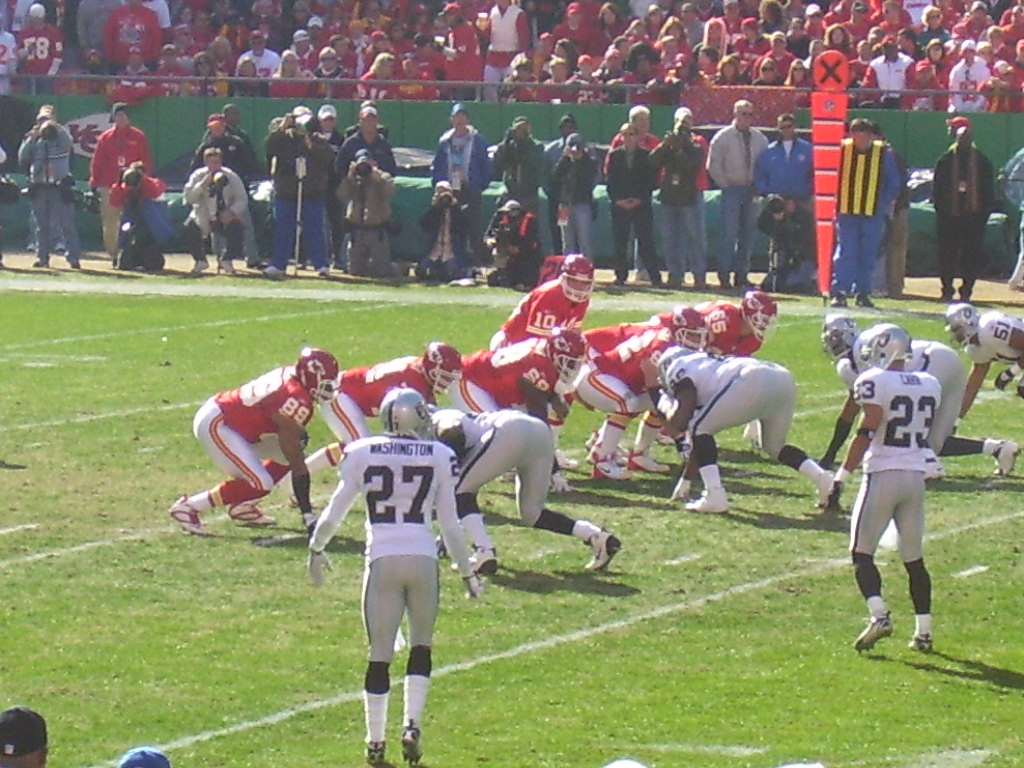
Kansas City on offense

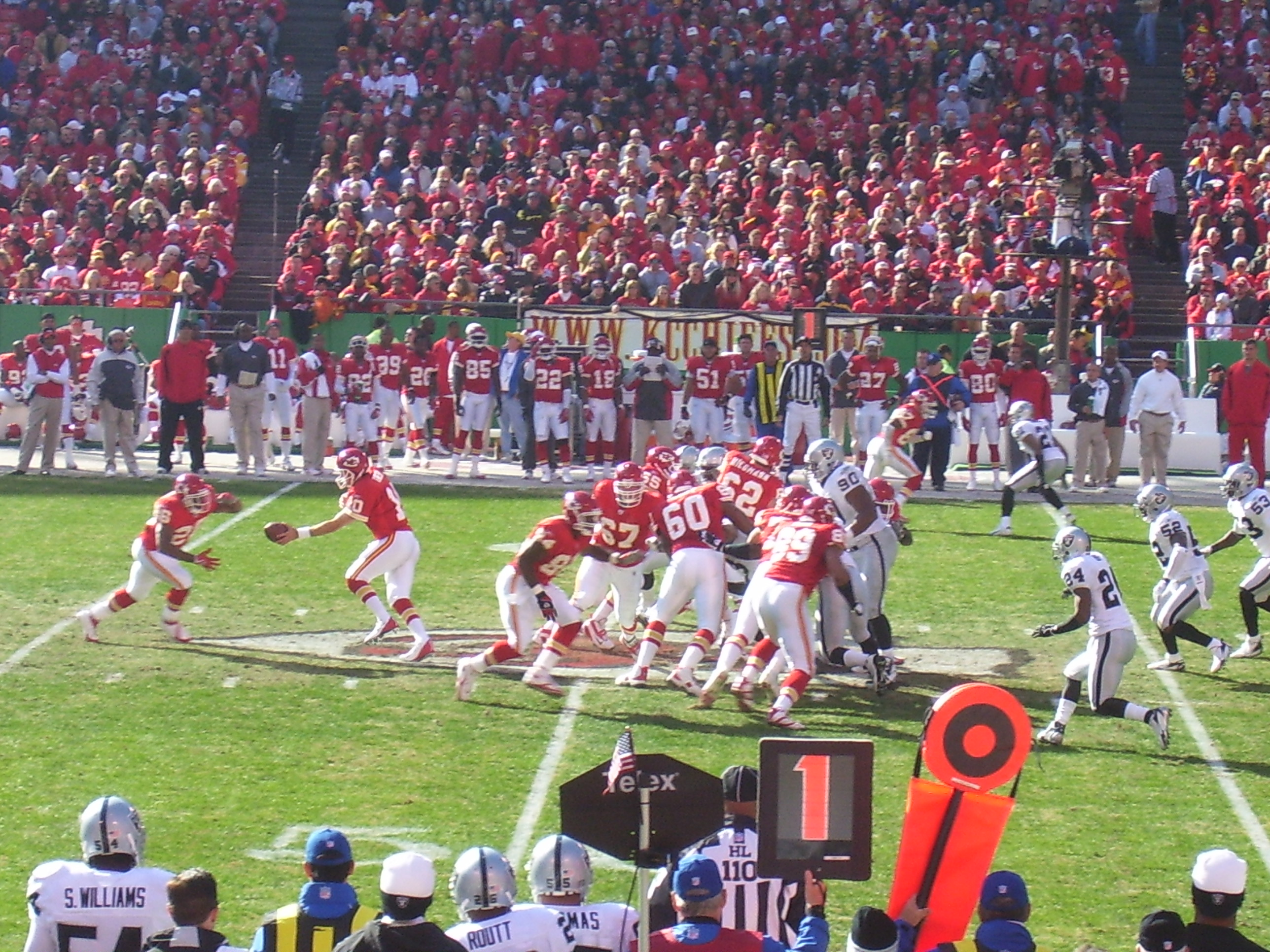
The Chiefs host the Oakland Raiders in a close-fought week 11 game, November 19, 2006

In the week before the game, Trent Green was cleared by his doctor to play in the game. Coach Herm Edwards said early Wednesday (November 15) that whatever decision he made would remain a secret until game time, but by the evening, Fox Sports reported Edwards confirmed Green to be the starting QB for the game. On the Chiefs' radio broadcast, Mitch Holthus noted the crowd was so deafening that it sounded "like a playoff game."

Trent Green took the field for the first time in two months, but barely threw the ball in the first half, gaining only 3-yards passing. Green was not making many throws for the first 3½ quarters. He attempted four passes in the first half for only three yards. Edwards said he dialed down the playbook not necessarily because of Green's rust but because the Chiefs wanted to get Larry Johnson more involved. With the help of backup Michael Bennett, Larry Johnson and the run game trampled the Raiders to get into the end zone from 5 yards out. The Chiefs led 7–0.

The noise from the Chiefs fans began to die down when the Raiders took the lead. After offensive struggles from both teams, the Chiefs finally managed to be within 15-yards until they were penalized for delay of game, setting them back 5 yards. The Chiefs managed to kick a field goal to make the game 13–10, reclaiming the lead. Through the fourth quarter, the Raiders were plagued with multiple penalties. Trent Green made his biggest throw of the game when he connected with Eddie Kennison for a 24-yard gain, and another to Samie Parker for 16 yards. Larry Johnson capped off the offensive drive by running 9-yards into the endzone. The play was challenged by Oakland and reversed, but the Chiefs still managed to score with a 1-yard touchdown by Johnson with less than 2 minutes to go in the game. After an PAT, the Chiefs secured their lead 17–13.

Aaron Brooks shot a pass from the 8 yard line to Randy Moss, but the ball was intercepted by rookie safety Jarrad Page with 30 seconds left in the game. The Chiefs secured the win with a kneel-down by Trent Green, and their seventh straight win over the Raiders, their 50th win over the Raiders in 95 meetings. The game marked the first time in 120 games, since 1999, that Tony Gonzalez did not play in the game.

Larry Johnson finished with a two-touchdown, 159-yard rushing game on his 27th birthday. Trent Green in his comeback performance finished with 9 completed passes out of 16 attempts for 102 yards passing. Aaron Brooks had his own impressive comeback by completing 13 or 22 passes for 179 yards passing and one touchdown. The Chiefs finished the game with only 92 yards passing, but 200 rushing. The Raiders were penalized 8 times for 65 yards.

With the win, the Chiefs improved to 6–4.

==== Week 12: vs. Denver Broncos ====
Thanksgiving Day games

Week 12: Denver Broncos at Kansas City Chiefs – Game summary

Quarter	1	2	3	4	Total
Broncos	0	3	7	0	**10**
**Chiefs**	3	7	3	6	**19**

at Arrowhead Stadium, Kansas City, Missouri

- Date: November 23
- Game time: 7:00 p.m. CST
- Game weather: Clear, 65 °F (18 °C)
- Game attendance: 79,484
- Referee: Bill Vinovich
- TV announcers (NFLN): Bryant Gumbel, Cris Collinsworth, and Adam Schefter
- Recap, Game Book

Game information

**First quarter**

- KC – Lawrence Tynes 24-yard field goal, 9:35. Chiefs 3–0. **Drive: 9 plays, 40 yards, 4:29.**

**Second quarter**

- KC – Larry Johnson 1-yard run (Lawrence Tynes kick), 3:03. Chiefs 10–0. **Drive: 13 plays, 88 yards, 7:41.**
- DEN – Jason Elam 31-yard field goal, 0:19. Chiefs 10–3. **Drive: 13 plays, 70 yards, 2:49.**

**Third quarter**

- KC – Lawrence Tynes 34-yard field goal, 11:20. Chiefs 13–3. **Drive: 10 plays, 51 yards, 3:40.**
- DEN – Stephen Alexander 1-yard pass from Jake Plummer (Jason Elam kick), 6:21. Chiefs 13–10. **Drive: 10 plays, 64 yards, 4:59.**

**Fourth quarter**

- KC – Lawrence Tynes 29-yard field goal, 14:56. Chiefs 16–10. **Drive: 11 plays, 49 yards, 6:25.**
- KC – Lawrence Tynes 21-yard field goal, 2:42. Chiefs 19–10. **Drive: 10 plays, 86 yards, 5:12.**

**Top passers**

- DEN – Jake Plummer – 25/39, 216 yards, TD, INT
- KC – Trent Green – 13/22, 161 yards, INT

**Top rushers**

- DEN – Mike Bell – 10 rushes, 28 yards
- KC – Larry Johnson – 34 rushes, 157 yards, TD

**Top receivers**

- DEN – Javon Walker – 6 receptions, 55 yards
- KC – Samie Parker – 3 receptions, 71 yards

On Thanksgiving, the Chiefs played their modern-day rivals, the Denver Broncos. The game was broadcast on the NFL Network as part of the NFL's new "Thanksgiving Tripleheader" tradition, set to kick off the NFL Network's broadcasts of Thursday and Saturday Night Football. The game also aired on Denver and Kansas City local television--KDVR-Fox 31 in Denver and WDAF-Fox 4 in Kansas City at 7pm Kansas City time. The game was broadcast on Westwood One radio. The game marked the first time in NFL history that the league played a triple-header on the holiday, and it was also the first Thanksgiving prime-time game.

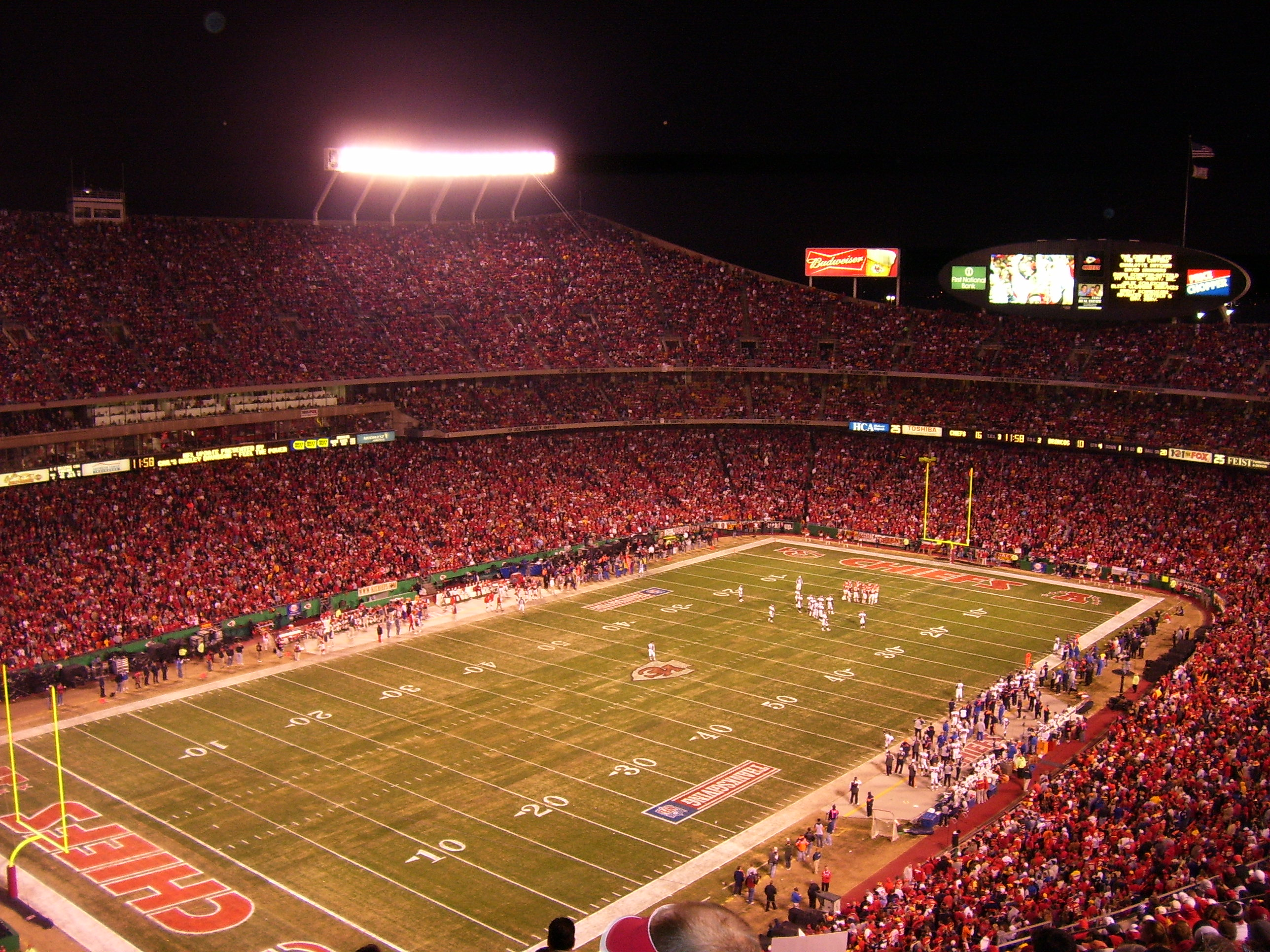
Arrowhead Stadium during the Chiefs-Broncos Thanksgiving game

After John Fogerty played at halftime, the Chiefs showed their own explosive firepower. A big gain by Samie Parker for 31-yards set up another field goal by Lawrence Tynes from 34 yards out. The Broncos fought back on their next possession. It appeared the Plummer threw his second interception of the game when Patrick Surtain intercepted a ball intended for Javon Walker, but a penalty on Lenny Walls reversed the call. The Chiefs led 13–10.

A defensive battle ensued in the fourth quarter, as the Broncos and Chiefs' defense held each other from scoring again. At the 30-yard line, a pass from Trent Green was intercepted by Darrent Williams, intended for Samie Parker. The Chiefs regained possession at 8:00 left in the game. The Chiefs secured the win

The game ball was given to Chiefs founder Lamar Hunt, who lobbied for 37-years to put a Thanksgiving game in Kansas City. The 74-year-old Hunt, who missed only a handful of games since founding the franchise, was admitted to a Dallas-area hospital on Wednesday, bitterly disappointed he would not see Kansas City's inaugurating the NFL's new Thanksgiving tripleheader.

Making the night even more festive was an in-house standing-room-only crowd of 80,866, the largest since 1972 (the year Arrowhead Stadium opened).

==== Week 13: at Cleveland Browns ====
Week 13: Kansas City Chiefs at Cleveland Browns – Game summary

Quarter	1	2	3	4	OT	Total
Chiefs	0	14	7	7	0	**28**
**Browns**	7	7	0	14	3	**31**

at Cleveland Browns Stadium, Cleveland, Ohio

- Date: December 3
- Game time: 1:00 p.m. EST/12:00 p.m. CST
- Game weather: Cloudy, cold, 31 °F (−1 °C)
- Game attendance: 71,927
- Referee: Bill Carollo
- TV announcers (CBS): Dick Enberg and Randy Cross
- Recap, Game Book

Game information

**First quarter**

- CLE – Braylon Edwards 23-yard pass from Charlie Frye (Phil Dawson kick), 9:46. Browns 7–0. **Drive: 8 plays, 63 yards, 5:14.**

**Second quarter**

- KC – Eddie Kennison 26-yard pass from Trent Green (Lawrence Tynes kick), 14:19. Tied 7–7. **Drive: 10 plays, 85 yards, 4:23.**
- KC – Tony Gonzalez 9-yard pass from Trent Green (Lawrence Tynes kick), 6:02. Chiefs 14–7. **Drive: 11 plays, 80 yards, 6:03.**
- CLE – Reuben Droughns 1-yard run (Phil Dawson kick), 9:46. Tied 14–14. **Drive: 8 plays, 63 yards, 5:14.**

**Third quarter**

- KC – Kris Wilson 6-yard pass from Trent Green (Lawrence Tynes kick), 10:08. Chiefs 21–14. **Drive: 9 plays, 77 yards, 4:52.**

**Fourth quarter**

- KC – Tony Gonzalez 23-yard pass from Trent Green (Lawrence Tynes kick), 12:19. Chiefs 28–14. **Drive: 14 plays, 99 yards, 7:41.**
- CLE – Steve Heiden 6-yard pass from Derek Anderson (Phil Dawson kick), 8:55. Chiefs 28–21. **Drive: 8 plays, 81 yards, 3:24.**
- CLE – Steve Heiden 3-yard pass from Derek Anderson (Phil Dawson kick), 0:35. Tied 28–28. **Drive: 9 plays, 70 yards, 4:42.**

**Overtime**

- CLE – Phil Dawson 33-yard field goal, 7:25. Browns 31–28. **Drive: 9 plays, 63 yards, 5:38.**

**Top passers**

- KC – Trent Green – 24/32, 297 yards, 4 TD, INT
- CLE – Derek Anderson – 12/21, 171 yards, 2 TD, INT

**Top rushers**

- KC – Larry Johnson – 28 rushes, 110 yards
- CLE – Reuben Droughns – 14 rushes, 70 yards, TD

**Top receivers**

- KC – Eddie Kennison – 7 receptions, 117 yards, TD
- CLE – Joe Jurevicius – 6 receptions, 75 yards

On December 3, the Chiefs traveled to Ohio to battle the Cleveland Browns following a 10-day break. The Chiefs looked to secure a three-game win streak over the Browns, who suffered from a 1–14 home record in December since 1999. The game was broadcast on CBS at noon Cleveland time.

On November 28, it was announced that former Chiefs starting running back Priest Holmes would not return for the remainder of the 2006 season, along with Chiefs cornerback William Bartee. Holmes has not played since October 30, 2005, when he was injured on a hit by Chargers linebacker Shawne Merriman in a game at San Diego. The injury left him with head and neck trauma, diagnosed by three spinal specialists.

Before halftime, the Browns tied the game with another touchdown, 14–14. Kansas City began the second half and Eddie Kennison racked in 39 yards with a pass from Trent Green. The Chiefs moved upfield and capped off another offensive drive with a touchdown from Kris Wilson. The play was challenged by Cleveland, but upheld. The Chiefs appeared to have sealed the win as they were up 28–14 with twelve minutes left in the game.

Cleveland fought back by finding holes in the Kansas City defense. A 54-yard pass to Jason Wright set the Browns up for a score. Steve Heiden caught a 6-yard pass for a touchdown, placing the Browns within a possession, 28–21. The Browns moved 81 yards in three and half minutes. Kansas City never found its offensive power again: a failed offensive drive gave the Browns possession again. With forty seconds remaining in the game, the Chiefs gave up another touchdown: a 3-yard pass to Steve Heiden tied the game. The Chiefs called a timeout with five seconds remaining but were clearly out of Lawrence Tynes' range for a game-winning field goal. A short pass to Tony Gonzalez, intending to reach out of bounds to stop the clock, led the game into overtime.

The Chiefs won the toss in overtime but incomplete passes barred them from winning their eighth game of the season. The game marked the second time this season that the Chiefs could not stop a team in overtime from advancing to the red zone and their second overtime loss from a field goal.

==== Week 14: vs. Baltimore Ravens ====
Week 14: Baltimore Ravens at Kansas City Chiefs – Game summary

Quarter	1	2	3	4	Total
**Ravens**	3	3	7	7	**20**
Chiefs	0	0	3	7	**10**

at Arrowhead Stadium, Kansas City, Missouri

- Date: December 10
- Game time: 12:00 p.m. CST
- Game weather: Clear, 49 °F (9 °C)
- Game attendance: 77,232
- Referee: Ed Hochuli
- TV announcers (CBS): Greg Gumbel and Dan Dierdorf
- Recap, Game Book

Game information

**First quarter**

- BAL – Matt Stover 41-yard field goal, 3:45. Ravens 3–0. **Drive: 9 plays, 53 yards, 4:20.**

**Second quarter**

- BAL – Matt Stover 23-yard field goal, 13:34. Ravens 6–0. **Drive: 8 plays, 29 yards, 4:14.**

**Third quarter**

- BAL – Mark Clayton 87-yard pass from Steve McNair (Matt Stover kick), 6:26. Ravens 13–0. **Drive: 2 plays, 88 yards, 0:56.**
- KC – Lawrence Tynes 49-yard field goal, 1:23. Ravens 13–3. **Drive: 10 plays, 47 yards, 4:03.**

**Fourth quarter**

- BAL – Jamal Lewis 1-yard run (Matt Stover kick), 2:51. Ravens 20–3. **Drive: 16 plays, 86 yards, 9:13.**
- KC – Dante Hall 5-yard pass from Trent Green (Lawrence Tynes kick), 1:20. Ravens 20–10. **Drive: 8 plays, 81 yards, 1:31.**

**Top passers**

- BAL – Steve McNair – 21/27, 283 yards, TD
- KC – Trent Green – 15/27, 178 yards, TD, 2 INT

**Top rushers**

- BAL – Jamal Lewis – 24 rushes, 81 yards, TD
- KC – Larry Johnson – 23 rushes, 120 yards

**Top receivers**

- BAL – Mark Clayton – 5 receptions, 112 yards, TD
- KC – Samie Parker – 5 receptions, 71 yards

On December 10, the Chiefs looked to extend their "December home game winning streak" to 19 games when they took on the Baltimore Ravens. The Chiefs previously won the past 18 games at home in December, leading back to their loss to the Indianapolis Colts on December 15, 1996. The game was broadcast on CBS at noon Kansas City time. Before the game, there was a moment of silence for ailing Chiefs owner and founder Lamar Hunt, who was still in the hospital seeking cancer treatment.

Throughout the first half, it was a defensive fight with the Ravens getting a 41-yard field goal in the first quarter and a 23-yard field goal in the second quarter by kicker Matt Stover. Within the first half, Trent Green committed three turnovers

In the third quarter, Kansas City fell big as blown coverage allowed Steve McNair to complete an 87-yard touchdown pass to Mark Clayton. The pass was the longest made by McNair in his career and Clayton's longest reception The blown coverage would seal the loss for the Chiefs. The score put the Ravens up 13–0 with just under 6 and a half minutes left in the third quarter. Chiefs fans began to file out of Arrowhead Stadium, realizing their team lost for the first time in December at home in over a decade.

==== Death of Lamar Hunt ====
In the late hours of Wednesday, December 13, Chiefs founder and owner Lamar Hunt died due to complications to prostate cancer at the age of 74. Hunt had been in the hospital seeking cancer treatment since November 22. Hunt was stricken with prostate cancer in September 1998 and underwent a series of chemotherapy treatments. In October 2003 he had surgery to remove the prostate gland.

Hunt is survived by wife Norma, children Lamar Jr., Sharron Munson, Clark and Daniel; and 13 grandchildren. Clark Hunt will oversee the family's sports interests. On Thursday, December 14, before the Thursday Night Football game on NFL Network between the San Francisco 49ers and Seattle Seahawks, a moment of silence was held to honor Lamar Hunt.

==== Week 15: at San Diego Chargers ====
Week 15: Kansas City Chiefs at San Diego Chargers – Game summary

Quarter	1	2	3	4	Total
Chiefs	0	3	3	3	**9**
**Chargers**	7	7	0	6	**20**

at Qualcomm Stadium, San Diego, California

- Date: December 17
- Game time: 7:15 p.m. CST/5:15 p.m. PST
- Game weather: Scattered clouds, 57 °F (14 °C)
- Game attendance: 66,583
- Referee: Jeff Triplette
- TV announcers (NBC): Al Michaels, John Madden, and Andrea Kremer
- Recap, Game Book

Game information

**First quarter**

- SD – LaDainian Tomlinson 15-yard run (Nate Kaeding kick), 9:15. Chargers 7–0. **Drive: 8 plays, 74 yards, 3:42.**

**Second quarter**

- KC – Lawrence Tynes 45-yard field goal, 13:01. Chargers 7–3. **Drive: 4 plays, 9 yards, 1:44.**
- SD – LaDainian Tomlinson 85-yard run (Nate Kaeding kick), 2:41. Chargers 14–3. **Drive: 1 play, 85 yards, 0:12.**

**Third quarter**

- KC – Lawrence Tynes 52-yard field goal, 2:22. Chargers 14–6. **Drive: 11 plays, 50 yards, 5:48.**

**Fourth quarter**

- SD – Nate Kaeding 30-yard field goal, 12:18. Chargers 17–6. **Drive: 9 plays, 31 yards, 5:04.**
- KC – Lawrence Tynes 24-yard field goal, 7:01. Chargers 17–9. **Drive: 7 plays, 33 yards, 3:07.**
- SD – Nate Kaeding 22-yard field goal, 4:40. Chargers 20–9. **Drive: 7 plays, 65 yards, 2:21.**

**Top passers**

- KC – Trent Green – 23/41, 185 yards, INT
- SD – Philip Rivers – 8/23, 97 yards, 2 INT

**Top rushers**

- KC – Larry Johnson – 19 rushes, 84 yards
- SD – LaDainian Tomlinson – 25 rushes, 199 yards, 2 TD

**Top receivers**

- KC – Tony Gonzalez – 6 receptions, 53 yards
- SD – Vincent Jackson – 3 receptions, 66 yards

The race in the AFC West continued to heat up in December, especially when the Chiefs took on the San Diego Chargers on prime-time national television. The Chiefs entered the game fighting to keep their playoff dreams alive while the San Diego Chargers looked to secure the home field advantage in the playoffs.

The game was scheduled to be broadcast on CBS at 1pm San Diego time, but on December 4, the game was officially chosen to be aired on NBC Sunday Night Football at 8:15 ET (6:15 San Diego time) as part of the league's new "flex scheduling" policy. The game marked the first time the Chiefs appeared on NBC Sunday Night Football, their first prime-time game in San Diego, and their first game to be aired on NBC since facing Denver in the AFC Divisional Playoff Game at Arrowhead on January 4, 1998.

Publicity fueled the Sunday night match when Chiefs defensive end Tamba Hali claimed the Chargers were a "finesse team" eight weeks ago after Kansas City beat San Diego 30–27 at Arrowhead Stadium in week 5. The game was the last time the Chargers lost before their seven-game winning streak leading into week 14.

Prior to kickoff, there was a video tribute and moment of silence for Hunt, who died Wednesday night of complications from prostate cancer. He was 74. The Chiefs had "LH" decals on the backs of their helmets. The Chiefs opted for white pants in honor of Lamar Hunt. The Chiefs got their start in Kansas City wearing white on white when playing on the road and some players appealed to coach Herm Edwards to go to the traditional look Sunday night.

After getting one sack in the previous two games and none in last week's loss to Baltimore, the Chiefs were able to put some pressure on Philip Rivers in the first half. James Reed and Tamba Hali each had a sack, and the Chiefs would have had a third, but Rivers was penalized for intentional grounding when he unloaded the ball. The Chiefs did not allow Chargers quarterback Philip Rivers to complete a pass until early in the second quarter when he threw for 18 yards to Vincent Jackson. The Chargers still led 7–3 at the time.

Tomlinson broke three NFL records: single-season scoring (186 points), single-season rushing touchdowns (28) and consecutive multi-touchdown games (eight). Tomlinson's 85-yard touchdown run in the second quarter was the game's deciding play. It gave the Chargers a 14–3 lead with less than 3 minutes until halftime. The Chiefs never recovered from the botched blocked punt and let the Chargers run away with their eleventh win of the season and homefield advantage in the playoffs.

Trent Green finished the game 23 of 41 with 185 yards passing, no touchdowns and one interception. It was Green's fourth loss in six games after returning from his injury in week one. Lawrence Tynes was the only scorer for the Chiefs, kicking three field goals from 45, 52 and 24 yards out.

The game was the Chiefs' third straight loss as they fell to 7–7 and the Chargers' eighth straight win as they improved to 12–2.

==== Week 16: at Oakland Raiders ====
Week 16: Kansas City Chiefs at Oakland Raiders – Game summary

Quarter	1	2	3	4	Total
**Chiefs**	10	7	0	3	**20**
Raiders	3	3	3	0	**9**

at McAfee Coliseum, Oakland, California

- Date: December 23
- Game time: 7:00 p.m. CST/5:00 p.m. PST
- Game weather: Partly cloudy, 55 °F (13 °C)
- Game attendance: 61,446
- Referee: Pete Morelli
- TV announcers (NFLN): Bryant Gumbel, Dick Vermeil, and Adam Schefter
- Recap, Game Book

Game information

**First quarter**

- OAK – Sebastian Janikowski 25-yard field goal, 10:09. Raiders 3–0. **Drive: 9 plays, 57 yards, 4:51.**
- KC – Eddie Kennison 6-yard pass from Trent Green (Lawrence Tynes kick), 5:21. Chiefs 7–3. **Drive: 11 plays, 60 yards, 4:48.**
- KC – Lawrence Tynes 29-yard field goal, 1:13. Chiefs 10–3. **Drive: 7 plays, 27 yards, 4:08.**

**Second quarter**

- OAK – Sebastian Janikowski 37-yard field goal, 11:43. Chiefs 10–6. **Drive: 8 plays, 33 yards, 4:30.**
- KC – Larry Johnson 1-yard run (Lawrence Tynes kick), 0:40. Chiefs 17–6. **Drive: 5 plays, 37 yards, 0:54.**

**Third quarter**

- OAK – Sebastian Janikowski 53-yard field goal, 8:49. Chiefs 17–9. **Drive: 7 plays, 24 yards, 3:35.**

**Fourth quarter**

- KC – Lawrence Tynes 28-yard field goal, 13:40. Chiefs 20–9. **Drive: 10 plays, 48 yards, 4:48.**

**Top passers**

- KC – Trent Green – 12/24, 148 yards, TD, INT
- OAK – Andrew Walter – 27/37, 226 yards, 2 INT

**Top rushers**

- KC – Larry Johnson – 31 rushes, 135 yards, TD
- OAK – Justin Fargas – 19 rushes, 90 yards

**Top receivers**

- KC – Tony Gonzalez – 5 receptions, 67 yards
- OAK – Ronald Curry – 11 receptions, 106 yards

On December 23, the Chiefs visited the Oakland Raiders for a Saturday night game. The game was broadcast on the NFL Network and local Oakland and Kansas City television at 5pm Oakland time. Former Chiefs head coach Dick Vermeil helped announce the game with Bryant Gumbel on NFL Network. The Chiefs had lost three straight and the Raiders lost seven in a row. The Raiders themselves had not beat the Chiefs in four years and were looking for their first division win since 2004.

Kansas City managed to hold Oakland throughout the first quarter while Lawrence Tynes managed to get a 29-yard field goal. Kansas City's Jared Allen recovered a fumble from Oakland's Andrew Walter after Walter was sandwiched by Allen and Kawika Mitchell. In the third quarter, the Raiders would get yet another field goal as Janikowski got one from 53 yards out. It would be the final score from Oakland of the night, and the third field goal. Kansas City looked to extend their lead with a kick from Lawrence Tynes but the kick was missed wide right. Kansas City still had the lead, 17–6.

The Chiefs became the first team to ever win eight straight against the Raiders. The Raiders (2–13) have lost eight straight overall and matched the franchise record for losses in a season set when they went 1–13 in 1962—the season before Davis arrived to coach and eventually own the team.

Larry Johnson has 398 yards rushing in three starts against the Raiders, and his 10 touchdowns in six games are his most against any opponent. Johnson broke Christian Okoye's club record of 370 carries in a season. Johnson's 31 carries gave him 383. With the win, Kansas City snapped its three-game skid, improved its record to 8–7, while the Raiders lost their eighth straight game of the season.

==== Week 17: vs. Jacksonville Jaguars ====
Week 17: Jacksonville Jaguars at Kansas City Chiefs – Game summary

Quarter	1	2	3	4	Total
Jaguars	0	10	14	6	**30**
**Chiefs**	7	14	14	0	**35**

at Arrowhead Stadium, Kansas City, Missouri

- Date: December 31
- Game time: 12:00 p.m. CST
- Game weather: Overcast, 40 °F (4 °C)
- Game attendance: 77,500
- Referee: Tony Corrente
- TV announcers (CBS): Gus Johnson and Steve Tasker
- Recap, Game Book

Game information

**First quarter**

- KC – Bernard Pollard blocked punt recovery in end zone (Lawrence Tynes kick), 9:10. Chiefs 7–0.

**Second quarter**

- JAX – Fred Taylor 26-yard pass from David Garrard (Josh Scobee kick), 14:06. Tied 7–7. **Drive: 9 plays, 78 yards, 5:54.**
- JAX – Josh Scobee 33-yard field goal, 9:59. Jaguars 10–7. **Drive: 6 plays, 28 yards, 3:02.**
- KC – Larry Johnson 1-yard run (Lawrence Tynes kick), 7:09. Chiefs 14–10. **Drive: 5 plays, 63 yards, 2:50.**
- KC – Eddie Kennison 35-yard pass from Trent Green (Lawrence Tynes kick), 1:52. Chiefs 21–10. **Drive: 6 plays, 72 yards, 2:38.**

**Third quarter**

- KC – Larry Johnson 2-yard run (Lawrence Tynes kick), 12:08. Chiefs 28–10. **Drive: 1 play, 2 yards, 0:04.**
- JAX – Quinn Gray 9-yard run (Josh Scobee kick), 9:31. Chiefs 28–17. **Drive: 5 plays, 59 yards, 2:37.**
- KC – Larry Johnson 12-yard run (Lawrence Tynes kick), 7:04. Chiefs 35–17. **Drive: 7 plays, 75 yards, 3:27.**
- JAX – Quinn Gray 17-yard run (Josh Scobee kick), 3:00. Chiefs 35–24. **Drive: 8 plays, 69 yards, 4:04.**

**Fourth quarter**

- JAX – Maurice Jones-Drew 5-yard run (run failed), 5:00. Chiefs 35–30. **Drive: 7 plays, 51 yards, 2:07.**

**Top passers**

- JAX – Quinn Gray – 13/22, 166 yards
- KC – Trent Green – 14/21, 181 yards, TD, 2 INT

**Top rushers**

- JAX – Maurice Jones-Drew – 12 rushes, 46 yards, TD
- KC – Larry Johnson – 33 rushes, 138 yards, 3 TD

**Top receivers**

- JAX – Matt Jones – 5 receptions, 104 yards
- KC – Eddie Kennison – 6 receptions, 144 yards, TD

On New Year's Eve 2006, the Chiefs closed out the regular season when they played the Jacksonville Jaguars. The team looked to restart their "December home game winning streak" during the cold, wintry weather. The game was broadcast on CBS at noon Kansas City time.

The game began with Kansas City under enormous doubt to reach the playoffs. Kansas City would slide into the tournament with a win, and losses by Tennessee, Cincinnati and Denver. The team started the day with the 10th seed in the AFC playoffs, but ended 2006 with an unexpected advancement. The Chiefs paid tribute to Hunt with a moment of silence before the game and the video boards played tributes before and during the game.

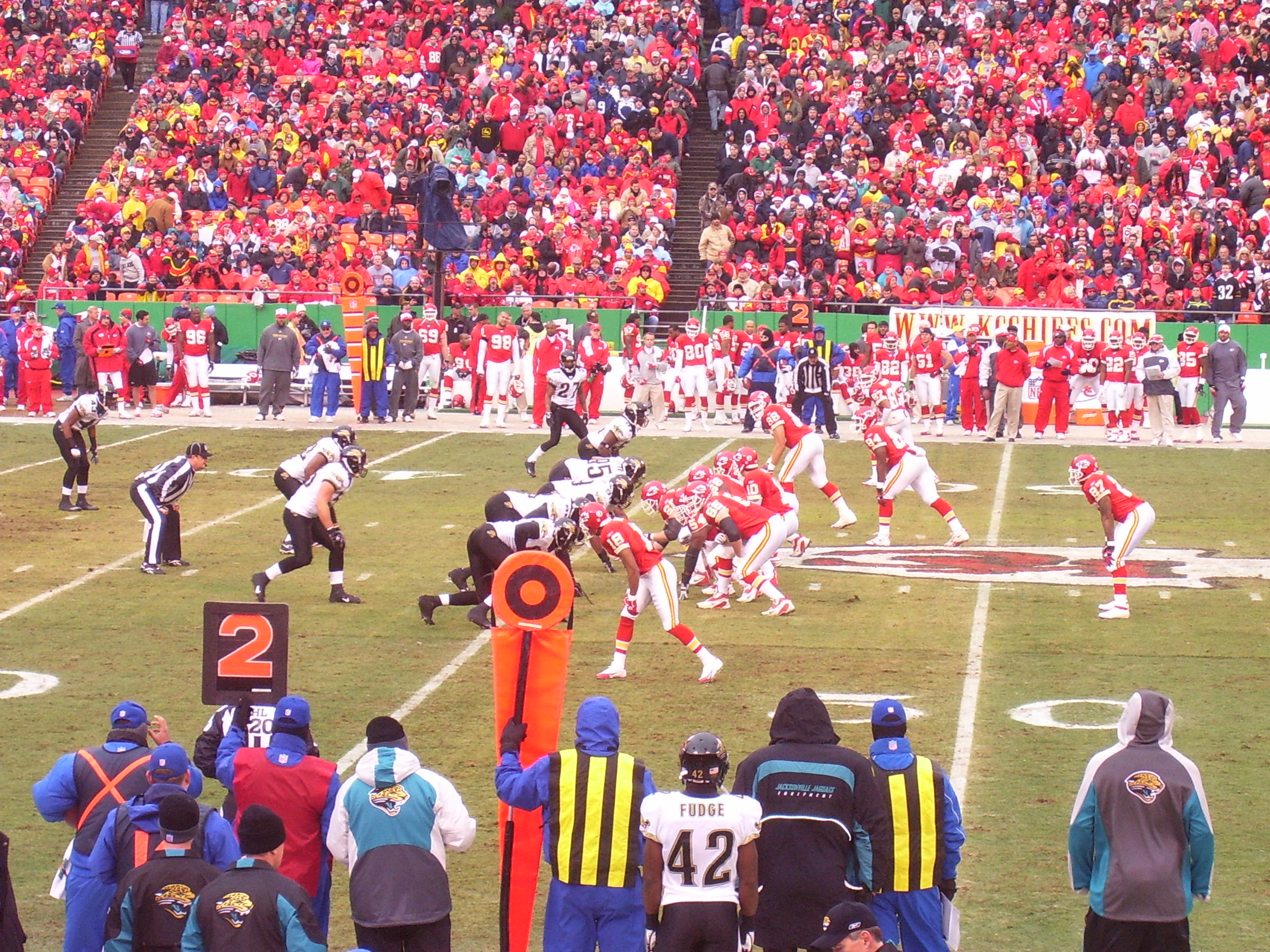
The Jaguars and Chiefs line up, week 17

Quarterback Trent Green was hit hard from Clint Ingram, resulting in a slightly sprained ankle. He sat out the next few drives as back-up quarterback Damon Huard returned to the field with the Kansas City offense to enormous applause. Huard threw a deep pass to Eddie Kennison (who miraculously held on to the ball after juggling it) and gained 40-yards. Huard handed off to Larry Johnson, who ran in for this third touchdown of the game from 12-yards out. The Chiefs were leading 35–17. By the end of the third quarter, Chiefs starting quarterback Trent Green was back in the game and threw an interception—a play that was met with jeers for Green and chants for Damon Huard to return.

Within the final five minutes, all of which Kansas City held possession, various penalties were issued against the Chiefs and Jaguars. The most notable of which came against Jacksonville's defensive tackle John Henderson and Kansas City's guard Brian Waters, both of which were flagged for unnecessary roughness. Both Henderson and Waters began to brawl against each other. Kansas City ran out the clock throughout the final two minutes and hung on for their ninth win of the season.

The Chiefs, needing four teams to lose in order to gain the final seed in the playoffs, had their wish come true. Kansas City clinched the final playoff berth with Denver's loss to San Francisco and fulfilled an almost impossible playoff scenario. For the first time since 2003, the Chiefs were heading back to the playoffs to face the team they lost to, the Indianapolis Colts.

Kansas City's Larry Johnson set the single-season record for carries. Johnson's 416 attempts passed Jamal Anderson's (Atlanta Falcons) 1998 record of 410 carries. Johnson finished the game with 138 yards on 33 carries with three touchdowns.

=== Standings ===
AFC West
	W	L	T	PCT	DIV	CONF	PF	PA	STK
^{(1)} San Diego Chargers	14	2	0	.875	5–1	10–2	492	303	W10
^{(6)} Kansas City Chiefs	9	7	0	.563	4–2	5–7	331	315	W2
Denver Broncos	9	7	0	.563	3–3	8–4	319	305	L1
Oakland Raiders	2	14	0	.125	0–6	1–11	168	332	L9

== Postseason ==
=== Schedule ===
The Kansas City Chiefs clinched the final wild card berth (as 6th seed) during the final week of the regular season with their win over Jacksonville, a loss by Tennessee, and two overtime losses by Cincinnati and Denver. The Chiefs played against the Indianapolis Colts.

The Chiefs were a 50-to-1 bet and the longest shot to win the Super Bowl, according to odds posted January 3, 2007 by online sportsbook PinnacleSports.com. Pinnacle pegged Kansas City at 30–1 to win the AFC title and a berth in the big game. The Chiefs held the sixth seed in the AFC playoff bracket, the same berth as the previous year's Super Bowl champion Pittsburgh Steelers. The Chiefs were eliminated by the Colts in the first round of the playoffs, losing by a score of 23–8.

Round	Date	Opponent (seed)	Result	Record	Venue	Recap
Wild Card	January 6	at Indianapolis Colts (3)	L 8–23	0–1	RCA Dome	Recap

=== Game summaries ===
==== AFC Wild Card Playoffs: at (3) Indianapolis Colts ====
AFC Wild Card Playoffs: (6) Kansas City Chiefs at (3) Indianapolis Colts – Game summary

Quarter	1	2	3	4	Total
Chiefs	0	0	8	0	8
Colts	6	3	7	7	23

at RCA Dome, Indianapolis, Indiana

- Date: January 6, 2007
- Game time: 4:30 p.m. EST/3:30 p.m. CST
- Game weather: None (indoor stadium)
- Game attendance: 57,215
- Referee: Jeff Triplette
- TV announcers (NBC): Tom Hammond, Cris Collinsworth, and Bob Neumeier
- Recap, Game Book

Game information

First quarter

- IND – Adam Vinatieri 48-yard field goal, 8:41. Colts 3–0. Drive: 10 plays, 39 yards, 4:51.
- IND – Adam Vinatieri 19-yard field goal, 2:09. Colts 6–0. Drive: 10 plays, 68 yards, 4:57.

Second quarter

- IND – Adam Vinatieri 50-yard field goal, 0:00. Colts 9–0. Drive: 6 plays, 33 yards, 0:50.

Third quarter

- IND – Joseph Addai 6-yard run (Adam Vinatieri kick), 4:14. Colts 16–0. Drive: 12 plays, 89 yards, 6:56.
- KC – Tony Gonzalez 6-yard pass from Trent Green (Trent Green–Kris Wilson pass), 0:08. Colts 16–8. Drive: 8 plays, 60 yards, 4:06.

Fourth quarter

- IND – Reggie Wayne 5-yard pass from Peyton Manning (Adam Vinatieri kick), 10:16. Colts 23–8. Drive: 9 plays, 71 yards, 4:52.

Top passers

- KC – Trent Green – 14/24, 107 yards, TD, 2 INT
- IND – Peyton Manning – 30/38, 268 yards, TD, 3 INT

Top rushers

- KC – Larry Johnson – 13 rushes, 32 yards
- IND – Joseph Addai – 25 rushes, 122 yards, TD

Top receivers

- KC – Larry Johnson – 5 receptions, 29 yards
- IND – Dallas Clark – 9 receptions, 103 yards

Entering the AFC Wild Card Round as the sixth-seed, the Chiefs began their playoff run in the RCA Dome against the third-seeded Indianapolis Colts. In the first half, Kansas City trailed early as Colts kicker Adam Vinatieri got a 48-yard and a 19-yard field goal in the first quarter, along with a 50-yard field goal in the second quarter. Also in the first half, the Chiefs offense was unable to get a single first down. In the third quarter, Indianapolis continued its domination with a 6-yard TD run by RB Joseph Addai. Afterwards, Kansas City's offense finally got going by not only getting some first downs, but they also capped off their drive with QB Trent Green completing a 6-yard TD pass to TE Tony Gonzalez. Following the touchdown, the Chiefs got a successful two-point conversion as Green completed the pass to FB Kris Wilson. However, the Colts continued its domination as in the fourth quarter, Colts QB Peyton Manning helped wrap up the game with a 5-yard TD pass to WR Reggie Wayne.

RB Larry Johnson, one of the league's top rushers, was held to just 32 yards on 13 carries, along with 29 receiving yards on 5 receptions, by the Colts defense (which was last in the league against the run).

Unlike the teams' previous meeting in the playoffs which consisted of an offensive shootout, both teams' defenses were the story of the game. With the loss, Kansas City ended its season with an overall record of 9–8.

=== 2007 Pro Bowl ===
Four Chiefs players were selected to play at the 2007 Pro Bowl, including RB Larry Johnson (2nd selection), TE Tony Gonzalez (8th selection), G Will Shields (12th selection) and G Brian Waters (3rd selection). Shields will make his 12th straight trip to Honolulu as a Pro Bowl performer, extending his record for the longest streak of Pro Bowl appearances in team history.

== Season statistics ==
=== Offense ===
Yards per game: 321.4 (#16 in NFL)

Total yards in season: 5,143 (#16 in NFL)

Points per game: 20.7 (#15 in NFL)

Quarterback rating: QB Damon Huard, 98.0 (#2 in NFL)

Rushing yards: RB Larry Johnson, 1,789 (#2 in NFL)

Total touchdowns: RB Larry Johnson, 19 (#2 in NFL)

=== Defense ===
Yards per game: 328.9 (#16 in NFL)

Total yards in season: 5,262 (#16 in NFL)

Points per game: 19.7 (T-#11 in NFL)
