= Lenny Walls =

American football player (born 1979)

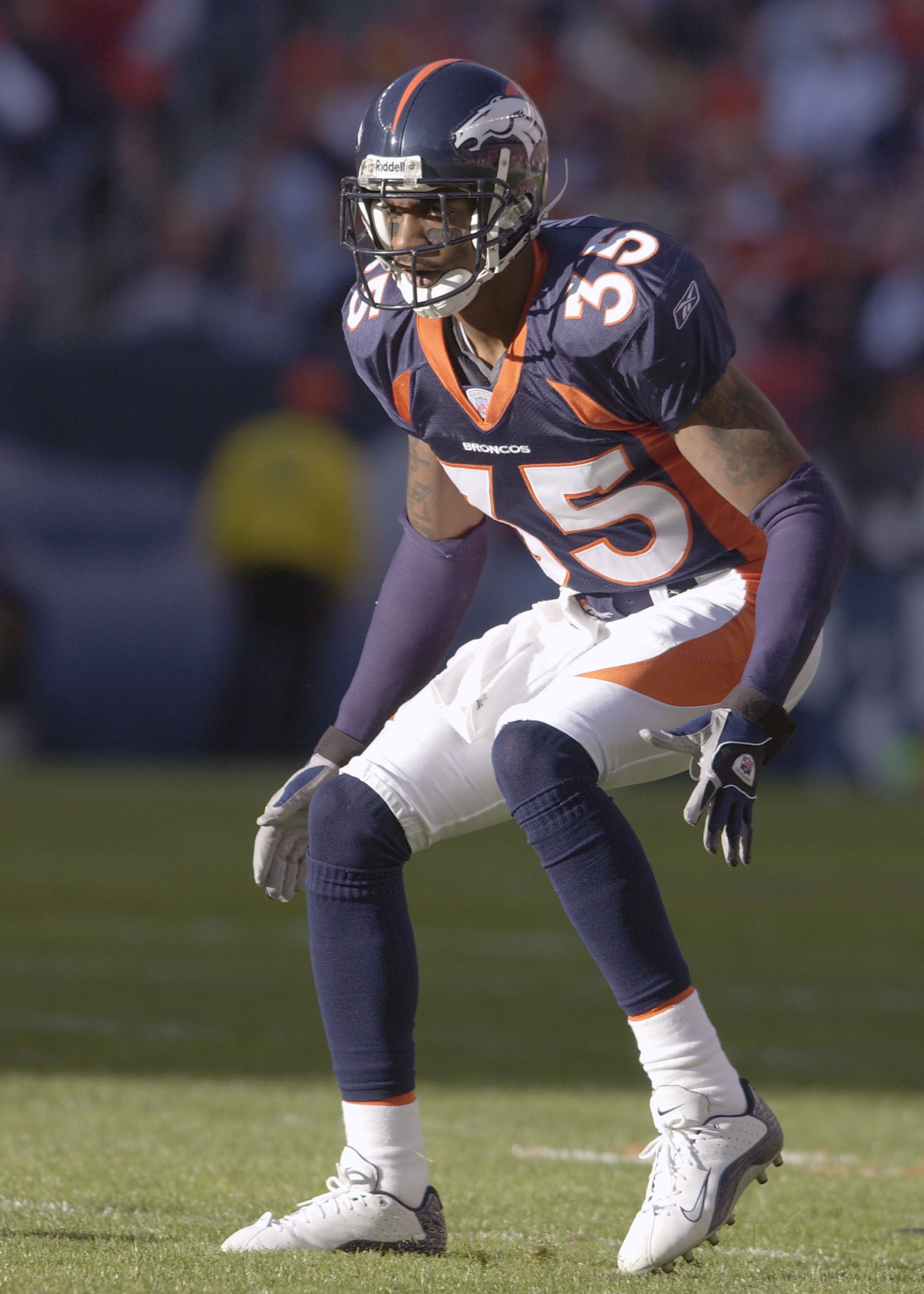
- Walls with the Denver Broncos in 2003

No. 35, 27
- Position: Cornerback

Personal information
- Born: September 26, 1979 (age 47); San Francisco, California, U.S.
- Listed height: 6 ft 4 in (1.93 m)
- Listed weight: 205 lb (93 kg)

Career information
- High school: Galileo (San Francisco)
- College: Boston College
- NFL draft: 2002: undrafted

Career history
- Denver Broncos (2002–2005); Oakland Raiders (2005); Kansas City Chiefs (2006); St. Louis Rams (2007); Baltimore Ravens (2008)*; Calgary Stampeders (2008); Winnipeg Blue Bombers (2009); Edmonton Eskimos (2010)
- * Offseason or practice squad member only

Awards and highlights
- Grey Cup champion (2008)

Career NFL statistics
- Total tackles: 139
- Forced fumbles: 2
- Fumble recoveries: 2
- Pass deflections: 28
- Interceptions: 1
- Stats at Pro Football Reference

Career CFL statistics
- Total tackles: 80
- Interceptions: 8
- Stats at CFL.ca (archived)

Lenny Brad Walls (born September 26, 1979) is an American former professional football player who was a cornerback in the National Football League (NFL) and Canadian Football League (CFL). He was signed by the Denver Broncos as an undrafted free agent in 2002. He played college football for the Boston College Eagles.

Walls was also a member of the Oakland Raiders, Kansas City Chiefs, St. Louis Rams, Baltimore Ravens, Calgary Stampeders, Winnipeg Blue Bombers, and Edmonton Eskimos. He helped the Stampeders win the 2008 Grey Cup.

== College career ==
After graduating from Galileo High School at San Francisco in 1997, Walls attended St. Mary's College of California and transferred to the City College of San Francisco then to Boston College. He played in 21 games for the Eagles and recorded 84 tackles, four sacks, nine interception and 17 pass breakups. At the City College of San Francisco he won a junior college championship and was a teammate of quarterback Nick Rolovich.

== Professional career ==
Pre-draft measurables
Height	Weight	Arm length	Hand span	40-yard dash	10-yard split	20-yard split	Vertical jump	Broad jump	Bench press
6 ft 4 1/4 in (1.94 m)	192 lb (87 kg)	33 1/2 in (0.85 m)	8 in (0.20 m)	4.68 s	1.59 s	2.66 s	37.0 in (0.94 m)	10 ft 0 in (3.05 m)	7 reps
All values from NFL Combine

=== Denver Broncos ===
Walls signed with the Denver Broncos after going undrafted in the 2002 NFL draft. After his signing, Walls became the tallest cornerback in the NFL at 6'4". He played in 13 games as a rookie in 2002 and recorded six tackles all on special teams. His only defensive appearance came against Baltimore, however his only stats of the game came on special teams with two tackles. His first forced fumble was against the St. Louis Rams.

In 2003, Walls started all 16 games and ranked fifth on Denver with 68 tackles and led the team with 20 pass breakups. His 20 pass breakups were the most in Denver history since Ray Crockett had 21 in 1997. Against San Diego he had six tackles while against Cincinnati he had five tackles and three pass breakups. In the AFC Wildcard game he recorded three tackles and a forced fumble.

In 2004, Walls played in seven games and had 21 tackles along with two pass breakups. He was later placed on injured reserve with a shoulder injury. In his season debut on September 12, he recorded four tackles before suffering the shoulder injury. After the injury, he played sporadically, either missing whole games or leaving in the fourth quarter or earlier.

In his final season in Denver, Walls had 16 tackles in seven games, with his final appearance as a Bronco coming against the New York Giants on October 23, 2005. He was placed on injured reserve with a groin injury on November 5, 2005.

=== Kansas City Chiefs ===
Walls signed a one-year deal worth $1.75 million with the Kansas City Chiefs on April 1, 2006. He played in all of the Chiefs 16 games and started two. In his 16 games he had 29 tackles. After the 2006 season his contract expired and he was not re-signed.

=== St. Louis Rams ===
On April 4, 2007, he signed with the St. Louis Rams as an unrestricted free agent. Walls played in five games and recorded nine tackles. He was waived on October 12, 2007.

=== Baltimore Ravens ===
Walls signed with the Baltimore Ravens on May 20, 2008. He was released at the end of training camp.

=== Calgary Stampeders ===
Walls signed with the Calgary Stampeders on September 22, 2008. His first two weeks with Calgary were spent on the practice roster before being activated and starting against the Saskatchewan Roughriders on October 13. Against the Roughriders he led the Stampeders with nine tackles and recorded his first interception in the CFL. After his debut in Calgary, he started every game for the rest of the year. In all of his starts with the Stampeders he got multiple tackles. He ended up with 23 tackles on the year but missed the playoffs including Calgary's 96th Grey Cup victory with an injury.

=== Winnipeg Blue Bombers ===
On May 15, 2009, Walls was traded to the Winnipeg Blue Bombers.

=== Edmonton Eskimos ===
After one season in Winnipeg, Walls signed as a free agent with the Eskimos on March 22, 2010. He was released during the following off-season on May 27, 2011.

== NFL career statistics ==
Legend
**Bold**	Career high

=== Regular season ===
Year	Team	Games		Tackles					Interceptions					Fumbles			
Year	Team	GP	GS	Cmb	Solo	Ast	Sck	TFL	Int	Yds	TD	Lng	PD	FF	FR	Yds	TD
2002	DEN	13	0	6	5	1	0.0	0	0	0	0	0	0	0	**1**	**5**	0
2003	DEN	**16**	**16**	**58**	**53**	**5**	0.0	**6**	**1**	0	0	0	**15**	**1**	**1**	0	0
2004	DEN	7	1	23	22	1	0.0	2	0	0	0	0	2	0	0	0	0
2005	DEN	7	3	17	17	0	0.0	0	0	0	0	0	4	**1**	0	0	0
2006	KC	**16**	2	27	26	1	0.0	0	0	0	0	0	4	0	0	0	0
2007	STL	5	3	8	7	1	0.0	0	0	0	0	0	3	0	0	0	0
		64	25	139	130	9	0.0	8	1	0	0	0	28	2	2	5	0

=== Playoffs ===
Year	Team	Games		Tackles					Interceptions					Fumbles			
Year	Team	GP	GS	Cmb	Solo	Ast	Sck	TFL	Int	Yds	TD	Lng	PD	FF	FR	Yds	TD
2003	DEN	**1**	**1**	3	3	0	0.0	0	0	0	0	0	0	**1**	0	0	0
2006	KC	**1**	0	**4**	**4**	0	0.0	0	0	0	0	0	0	0	0	0	0
		2	1	7	7	0	0.0	0	0	0	0	0	0	1	0	0	0
