= William Bartee =

American football player (born 1977)

No. 24, 21
- Position: Cornerback

Personal information
- Born: June 25, 1977 (age 49); Daytona Beach, Florida, U.S.
- Listed height: 6 ft 1 in (1.85 m)
- Listed weight: 200 lb (91 kg)

Career information
- High school: Atlantic (Port Orange, Florida)
- College: Oklahoma
- NFL draft: 2000: 2nd round, 54th overall pick

Career history
- Kansas City Chiefs (2000–2006)

Career NFL statistics
- Tackles: 201
- Sacks: 3.5
- Stats at Pro Football Reference

William Anthony Bartee (/bɑːrˈtiː/ bar-TEE; born June 25, 1977) is an American former professional football player who was a cornerback in the National Football League (NFL). He played his entire career for the Kansas City Chiefs. He spent two years playing college football for the Oklahoma Sooners after attending Butler County Community College in El Dorado, Kansas. He totaled 60 tackles, two interceptions, two fumble recoveries, 2 forced fumbles, 7 tackles for loss, 12 passes defensed and 1 sack. He was selected by Kansas City in the 2000 NFL draft. Before the 2006 season, the Chiefs signed Ty Law, so William Bartee agreed to change his number from 24 to 21.

Bartee missed the entire 2006 season due to injury and was placed on the PUP list in November. He was released by the Chiefs after the season.

== NFL stats ==
Year	Team	Games	Combined tackles	Tackles	Assisted tackles	Sacks	Forced fumbles	Fumble recoveries
2000	KC	16	27	23	4	1.0	0	0
2001	KC	16	38	36	2	1.0	0	0
2002	KC	14	83	77	6	0.0	1	0
2003	KC	11	30	26	4	0.0	0	1
2004	KC	14	46	40	6	1.5	0	0
2005	KC	16	5	4	1	0.0	0	0
Career		87	229	206	23	3.5	1	1
