= Tre' Stallings =

American football player and administrator (born 1983)

No. 61
- Position: Guard

Personal information
- Born: January 8, 1983 (age 43); Magnolia, Mississippi, U.S.
- Listed height: 6 ft 3 in (1.91 m)
- Listed weight: 315 lb (143 kg)

Career information
- High school: South Pike (Magnolia)
- College: Mississippi
- NFL draft: 2006: 6th round, 186th overall pick

Career history

Playing
- Kansas City Chiefs (2006–2007); Baltimore Ravens (2008–2009)*
- * Offseason or practice squad member only

Operations
- Illinois (2017–present) Director of football player development

Awards and highlights
- First-team All-SEC (2005); SEC All-Freshman (2002)

Career NFL statistics
- Games played: 1
- Stats at Pro Football Reference

Cornelius Tre' Stallings (born January 8, 1983) is an American former professional football player who was a guard in the National Football League (NFL). He played college football for the Ole Miss Rebels and was selected by the Kansas City Chiefs in the sixth round of the 2006 NFL draft.

Pre-draft measurables
Height	Weight	40-yard dash	20-yard shuttle	Three-cone drill	Vertical jump	Broad jump	Bench press
6 ft 2 7/8 in (1.90 m)	311 lb (141 kg)	5.30 s	4.80 s	8.05 s	28.0 in (0.71 m)	8 ft 6 in (2.59 m)	28 reps
All values from Pro Day
