= Kris Wilson (American football) =

American football player (born 1981)

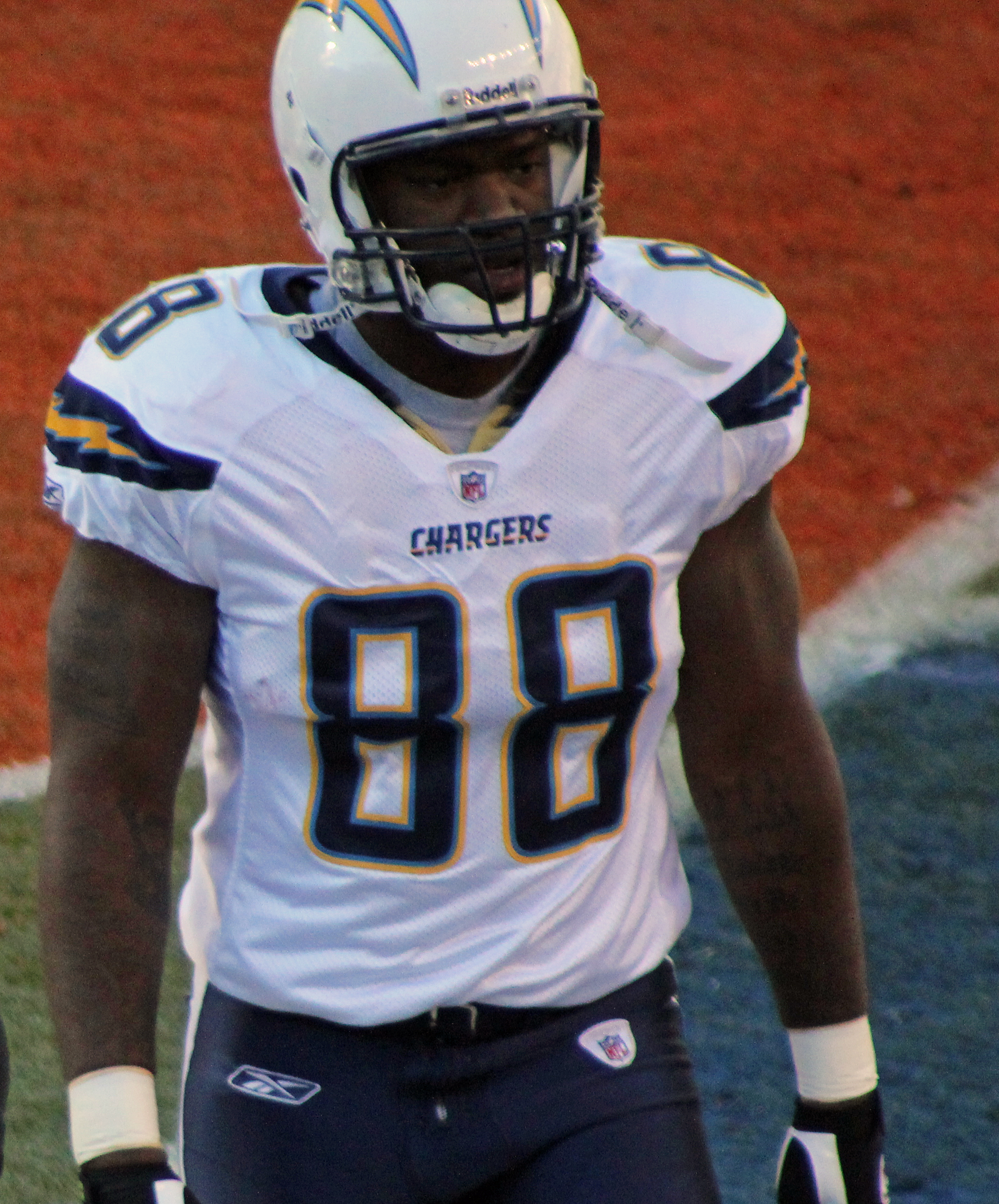
- Wilson with the San Diego Chargers in 2011

No. 84, 88, 87
- Positions: Tight end, fullback

Personal information
- Born: August 22, 1981 (age 45); Harrisburg, Pennsylvania, U.S.
- Listed height: 6 ft 2 in (1.88 m)
- Listed weight: 250 lb (113 kg)

Career information
- High school: J. P. McCaskey (Lancaster, Pennsylvania)
- College: Pittsburgh (1999–2003)
- NFL draft: 2004: 2nd round, 61st overall pick

Career history
- Kansas City Chiefs (2004–2007); Philadelphia Eagles (2008)*; San Diego Chargers (2008–2010); Baltimore Ravens (2011)
- * Offseason or practice squad member only

Awards and highlights
- Third-team All-American (2003)

Career NFL statistics
- Receptions: 52
- Receiving yards: 446
- Receiving touchdowns: 5
- Stats at Pro Football Reference

Kristopher Wilson (born August 22, 1981) is an American former professional football player who was a tight end in the National Football League (NFL). He was selected by the Kansas City Chiefs in the second round of the 2004 NFL draft. He played college football for the Pittsburgh Panthers. Wilson was also a member of the Philadelphia Eagles, San Diego Chargers, and Baltimore Ravens.

== Early life ==
Wilson attended J. P. McCaskey High School. As a senior, he won first-team All-Lancaster-Lebanon Section One honors at both linebacker and wide receiver.

He received a full scholarship to the University of Pittsburgh, graduating with a bachelor's degree in economics. After redshirting and moving from outside linebacker to the tight end position, Wilson became a four-year starter, earning All-Big East honors both academically and athletically. As a redshirt senior, he caught 44 receptions and led all NCAA Division 1-A tight ends with 9 receiving touchdowns, earning a spot as one of three finalists for the John Mackey Award in 2003, which is awarded to the nation's most outstanding tight end.

Wilson's mother, Deborah, is a licensed Social Worker with a master's degree from Temple University.

== Professional career ==
=== Kansas City Chiefs ===
Wilson entered the 2004 NFL draft, and was selected in the second round (61st overall) by the Kansas City Chiefs of the National Football League. Wilson started 23 of 49 games played with the Chiefs, serving mostly as a tight end in tandem alongside Tony Gonzalez and Jason Dunn, in packages where the Chiefs used multiple tight ends. He caught 42 receptions for 345 yards and four touchdowns. While playing fullback Wilson blocked for running backs Larry Johnson and Priest Holmes, and also rushed four times for 13 yards. Wilson appeared in the 2005 NFL Wildcard Playoff game versus the Indianapolis Colts, during which he was targeted twice and caught two receptions.

=== San Diego Chargers ===
After a short stint with the Philadelphia Eagles in the 2008 offseason, Wilson signed a two-year contract with the San Diego Chargers. Wilson played the tight end position for the Chargers, alongside Antonio Gates, Brandon Manumaleuna, and Randy McMichael. Wilson caught four passes for 28 yards and two touchdowns in 2009, including a touchdown reception from Philip Rivers in the 2009 AFC Divisional Playoffs, after not catching any passes in the games he played in 2008. Wilson signed another two-year contract with the San Diego Chargers in March 2010. He had 113 yards in 2010, but was released on July 28, 2011.

=== Baltimore Ravens ===
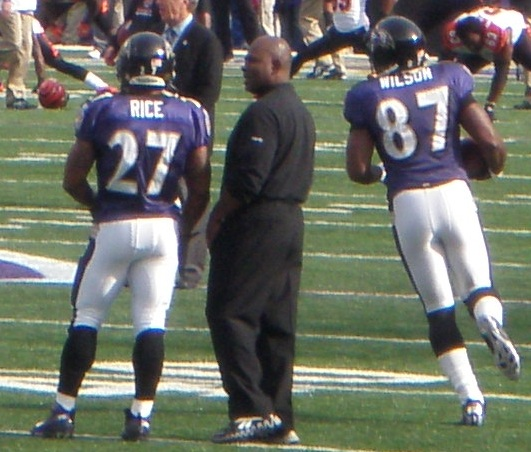
L/R: Running back Ray Rice, running backs coach Wilbert Montgomery, and Wilson before a 2011 game against the Cincinnati Bengals.

In 2011, Wilson signed with the Baltimore Ravens after Todd Heap was released. In an AFC Divisional playoff win against the Houston Texans, Wilson caught a one-yard touchdown pass from Joe Flacco.

== Personal life ==
Wilson is a graduate of UCLA School of Law, class of 2015. He also graduated from UCLA School of Theater, Film and Television in 2019. Wilson currently works as a producer and director at NFL Films, and owns the wedding production franchise Live Picture Studios of Philadelphia.
