= 2004 Kansas City Chiefs season =

NFL team season

- Owner: Lamar Hunt
- General manager: Carl Peterson
- Head coach: Dick Vermeil
- Home stadium: Arrowhead Stadium

Results
- Record: 7–9
- Division place: 3rd AFC West
- Playoffs: Did not qualify
- All-Pros: 5: FB Tony Richardson (2nd team); TE Tony Gonzalez (2nd team); OT Willie Roaf (1st team); G Will Shields (2nd team); G Brian Waters (1st team)
- Pro Bowlers: 6: FB Tony Richardson; TE Tony Gonzalez; OT Willie Roaf; G Will Shields; G Brian Waters; LS Kendall Gammon

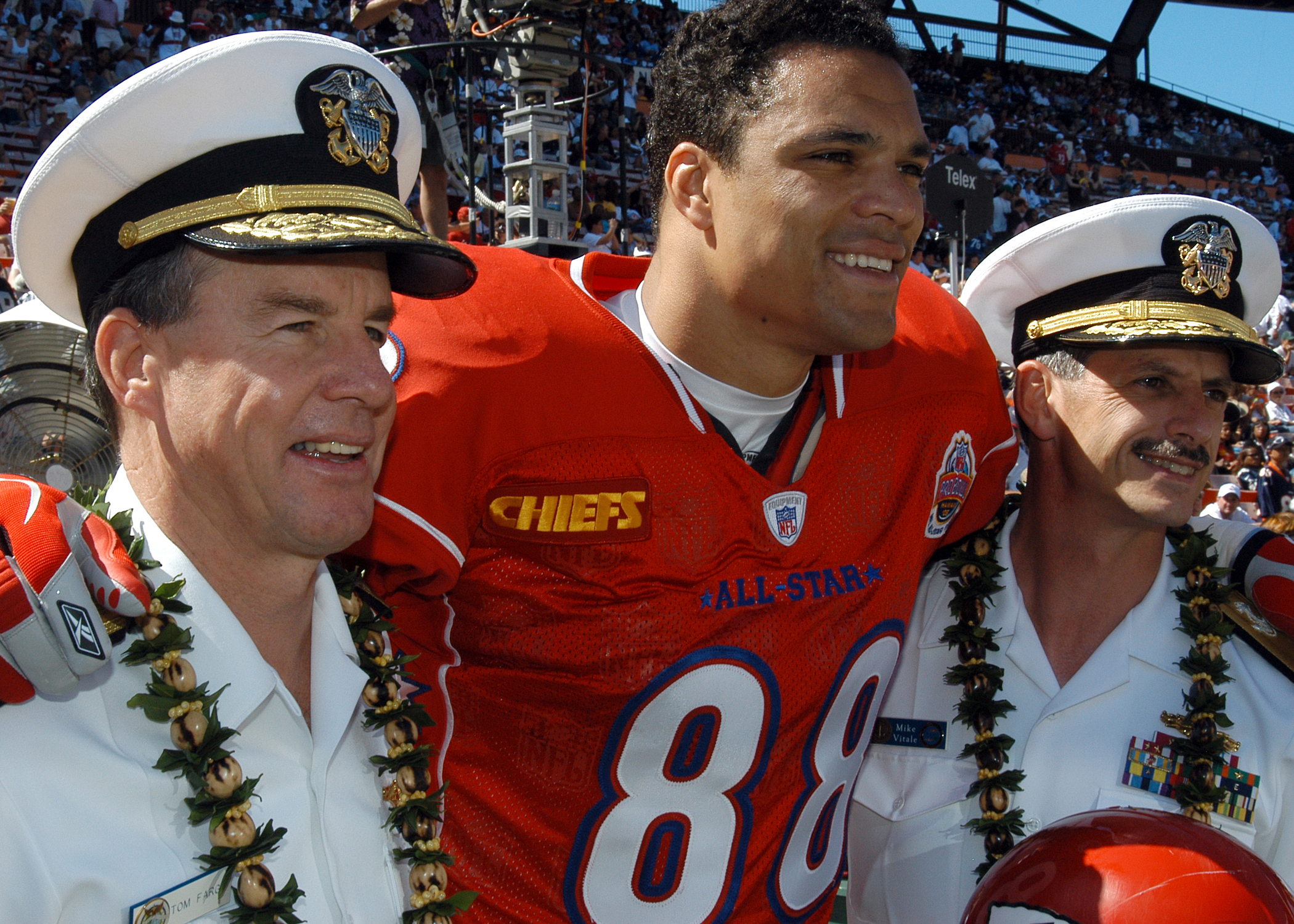
Kansas City Chief's Tight End Tony Gonzalez (Center) prior to the kickoff of the 2005 NFL Pro Bowl held in Honolulu, Hawaii.

The 2004 season was the Kansas City Chiefs' 35th in the National Football League (NFL), their 45th overall and their 42nd in Kansas City.

The 2004 season proved not to be as successful as the team's previous season. Though the Chiefs finished the regular season with the most yards and the second highest number of points, they also had a losing record of 7–9 and no playoff appearance. In fact, the Chiefs' 483 points-scored was the highest total in NFL history for a team that finished the season with a losing record. The Chiefs joined the 1975 Buffalo Bills as the only teams in NFL history to score an average of at least 30 points per game and miss the playoffs.

== Offseason ==
=== Draft ===
2004 Kansas City Chiefs draft
| Round | Selection | Player | Position | College |
|---|---|---|---|---|
| 2 | 36 | Junior Siavii | Defensive tackle | Oregon |
| 2 | 61 | Kris Wilson | Tight end | Pittsburgh |
| 3 | 93 | Keyaron Fox | Linebacker | Georgia Tech |
| 4 | 105 | Samie Parker | Wide receiver | Oregon |
| 4 | 126 | Jared Allen | Defensive end | Idaho State |
| 6 | 195 | Jeris McIntyre | Wide receiver | Auburn |
| 7 | 212 | Kevin Sampson | Offensive tackle | Syracuse |

== Personnel ==
=== Staff / Coaches ===
2004 Kansas City Chiefs staff
| Front office: Founder – Lamar Hunt; President/general manager/chief executive officer – Carl Peterson; Chairman of the board – Jack Steadman; Vice chairman of the board – Clark Hunt; Executive vice president/assistant general manager – Dennis Thum; Vice president of football operations/player personnel – Lynn Stiles; Director of football administration – Mike White; Director of pro personnel – Bill Kuharich; Head coaches: Head coach – Dick Vermeil; Assistant head coach/offensive coordinator – Al Saunders; Offensive coaches: Quarterbacks – Jason Verduzco; Running backs – James Saxon; Wide receivers – Charlie Joiner; Tight ends – Keith Rowen; Offensive line – Mike Solari; Assistant offensive line – Irv Eatman; Offensive assistant/quality control – Jason Verduzco; Offensive quality control – Bob Saunders | Defensive coaches: Defensive coordinator – Gunther Cunningham; Defensive line – Carl Hairston; Defensive line – Bob Karmelowicz; Linebackers – Fred Pagac; Defensive backs – Peter Giunta; Defensive assistant/quality control – Darvin Wallis; Special teams coaches: Special teams – Frank Gansz Jr; Assistant special teams – Chad O'Shea; Strength and conditioning: Strength and conditioning – Jeff Hurd; Assistant strength and conditioning – Billy Long |

=== Roster ===
2004 Kansas City Chiefs roster
| Quarterbacks (QB): 15 Todd Collins; 10 Trent Green; 19 Damon Huard; Running backs (RB): 24 Derrick Blaylock; 43 Omar Easy FB; 27 Larry Johnson; 49 Tony Richardson FB; Wide receivers (WR): 82 Dante Hall; 81 Chris Horn; 87 Eddie Kennison; 80 Johnnie Morton; 18 Samie Parker; 17 Richard Smith; Tight ends (TE): 89 Jason Dunn; 88 Tony Gonzalez; 84 Kris Wilson | Offensive linemen (OL): 65 Jordan Black LT; 67 Chris Bober C; 66 Johnathan Ingram C; 77 Willie Roaf LT; 79 Kevin Sampson RT; 68 Will Shields G; 54 Brian Waters G; 62 Casey Wiegmann C; 74 Brett Williams RT; Defensive linemen (DL): 69 Jared Allen DE; 93 John Browning DE/DT; 75 Lional Dalton DT; 98 Eric Hicks DE; 94 Junior Siavii DT; 90 Ryan Sims DT; 55 Gary Stills DE; 96 Jimmy Wilkerson DE | Linebackers (LB): 56 Monty Beisel MLB; 52 Quinton Caver OLB; 97 Keyaron Fox OLB; 51 Scott Fujita OLB; 53 Fred Jones OLB; 50 Kawika Mitchell MLB; 91 Rich Scanlon MLB; Defensive backs (DB): 24 William Bartee CB; 26 Julian Battle CB; 41 Scott Connot SS; 42 Shaunard Harts FS; 22 Dexter McCleon CB; 35 Willie Pile SS; 20 Benny Sapp CB; 44 Eric Warfield CB; 25 Greg Wesley SS; 21 Jerome Woods FS; Special teams (ST): 4 Nick Murphy P; 83 Kendall Gammon LS; 1 Lawrence Tynes K | Practice squad: 13 John Booth WR; 34 Ronnie Cruz FB; 47 Aaron Golliday TE; 60 Aaron Johnson G; 14 Jeris McIntyre WR; 73 Matt Miller RT; 61 Montique Sharpe DT; 30 Jonathan Smith RB; Reserve: 59 Shawn Barber OLB (IR); 85 Marc Boerigter WR (IR); 99 Vonnie Holliday DE (IR); 31 Priest Holmes RB (IR); 57 Mike Maslowski LB (IR); 76 John Welbourn RT (IR); Rookies in italics 53 active, 6 reserve, 8 practice squad |

== Preseason ==
=== Schedule ===
| Week | Date | Opponent | Result | Record | Venue | Recap |
|---|---|---|---|---|---|---|
| 1 | August 13 | at New York Giants | L 24–34 | 0–1 | Giants Stadium | Recap |
| 2 | August 23 | St. Louis Rams | W 24–7 | 1–1 | Arrowhead Stadium | Recap |
| 3 | August 28 | Cleveland Browns | L 19–21 | 1–2 | Arrowhead Stadium | Recap |
| 4 | September 2 | at Dallas Cowboys | L 20–24 | 1–3 | Texas Stadium | Recap |

=== Game summaries ===
==== Week 1: at New York Giants ====
Week 1: Kansas City Chiefs at New York Giants – Game summary

| Quarter | 1 | 2 | 3 | 4 | Total |
|---|---|---|---|---|---|
| Chiefs | 14 | 10 | 0 | 0 | 24 |
| Giants | 0 | 17 | 0 | 17 | 34 |

at Giants Stadium, East Rutherford, New Jersey

- Date: August 13
- Game time: 8:00 p.m. EDT/7:00 p.m. CDT
- Game weather: Light rain, 73 °F (23 °C)
- Game attendance: 76,476
- Referee: Terry McAulay
- Recap, Game Book

Game information

First quarter

- KC – Kris Wilson 23-yard pass from Trent Green (Lawrence Tynes kick), 8:39. Chiefs 7–0. Drive: 6 plays, 66 yards, 1:51.
- KC – Larry Johnson 3-yard run (Lawrence Tynes kick), 1:34. Chiefs 14–0. Drive: 10 plays, 91 yards, 5:00.

Second quarter

- NYG – Ron Dayne 29-yard run (Bill Gramática kick), 12:14. Chiefs 14–7. Drive: 8 plays, 62 yards, 4:20.
- KC – Lawrence Tynes 27-yard field goal, 7:41. Chiefs 17–7. Drive: 10 plays, 64 yards, 4:33.
- NYG – Ron Dayne 67-yard run (Bill Gramática kick), 7:13. Chiefs 17–14. Drive: 2 plays, 67 yards, 0:28.
- KC – Omar Easy 1-yard run (Lawrence Tynes kick), 1:15. Chiefs 24–14. Drive: 11 plays, 84 yards, 4:58.
- NYG – Bill Gramática 42-yard field goal, 0:00. Chiefs 24–17. Drive: 7 plays, 53 yards, 1:15.

Third quarter

- No scoring plays.

Fourth quarter

- NYG – Bill Gramática 26-yard field goal, 14:52. Chiefs 24–20. Drive: 6 plays, 47 yards, 2:07.
- NYG – David Tyree 11-yard pass from Jesse Palmer (Bill Gramática kick), 6:32. Giants 27–24. Drive: 2 plays, 16 yards, 0:40.
- NYG – Chris Douglas 26-yard run (Bill Gramática kick), 1:54. Giants 34–24. Drive: 6 plays, 53 yards, 2:32.

Top passers

- KC – Todd Collins – 13/19, 165 yards
- NYG – Eli Manning – 7/13, 91 yards

Top rushers

- KC – Priest Holmes – 2 rushes, 24 yards
- NYG – Ron Dayne – 11 rushes, 118 yards, 2 TD

Top receivers

- KC – Richard Smith – 3 receptions, 74 yards
- NYG – Marcellus Rivers – 2 receptions, 47 yards

==== Week 2: vs. St. Louis Rams ====
Week 2: St. Louis Rams at Kansas City Chiefs – Game summary

| Quarter | 1 | 2 | 3 | 4 | Total |
|---|---|---|---|---|---|
| Rams | 0 | 0 | 7 | 0 | 7 |
| Chiefs | 7 | 17 | 0 | 0 | 24 |

at Arrowhead Stadium, Kansas City, Missouri

- Date: August 23
- Game time: 7:00 p.m. CDT
- Game weather: Overcast, 71 °F (22 °C)
- Game attendance: 75,428
- Referee: Mike Carey
- Recap, Game Book

Game information

First quarter

- KC – Priest Holmes 2-yard run (Morten Andersen kick), 7:50. Chiefs 7–0. Drive: 10 plays, 76 yards, 4:58.

Second quarter

- KC – Derrick Blaylock 1-yard run (Morten Andersen kick), 9:31. Chiefs 14–0. Drive: 10 plays, 55 yards, 4:43.
- KC – Morten Andersen 28-yard field goal, 1:53. Chiefs 17–0. Drive: 13 plays, 57 yards, 5:50.
- KC – Shawn Barber 60-yard interception return (Morten Andersen kick), 1:08. Chiefs 24–0.

Third quarter

- STL – Steven Jackson 6-yard run (Jeff Wilkins kick), 7:29. Chiefs 24–7. Drive: 12 plays, 61 yards, 6:04.

Fourth quarter

- No scoring plays.

Top passers

- STL – Chris Chandler – 6/11, 89 yards
- KC – Trent Green – 10/12, 94 yards

Top rushers

- STL – Steven Jackson – 14 rushes, 53 yards, TD
- KC – Derrick Blaylock – 9 rushes, 32 yards, TD

Top receivers

- STL – Kevin Curtis – 5 receptions, 86 yards
- KC – Marc Boerigter – 4 receptions, 50 yards

==== Week 3: vs. Cleveland Browns ====
Week 3: Cleveland Browns at Kansas City Chiefs – Game summary

| Quarter | 1 | 2 | 3 | 4 | Total |
|---|---|---|---|---|---|
| Browns | 0 | 7 | 0 | 14 | 21 |
| Chiefs | 6 | 0 | 13 | 0 | 19 |

at Arrowhead Stadium, Kansas City, Missouri

- Date: August 28
- Game time: 7:00 p.m. CDT
- Game weather: Clear, 76 °F (24 °C)
- Game attendance: 76,086
- Referee: Tom White
- Recap, Game Book

Game information

First quarter

- KC – Lawrence Tynes 28-yard field goal, 9:13. Chiefs 3–0. Drive: 7 plays, 51 yards, 2:23.
- KC – Lawrence Tynes 48-yard field goal, 0:27. Chiefs 6–0. Drive: 11 plays, 57 yards, 5:42.

Second quarter

- CLE – Lee Suggs 28-yard run (Phil Dawson kick), 13:58. Browns 7–6. Drive: 3 plays, 70 yards, 1:29.

Third quarter

- KC – Derrick Blaylock 9-yard pass from Todd Collins (Lawrence Tynes kick), 7:47. Chiefs 13–7. Drive: 9 plays, 64 yards, 4:21.
- KC – Omar Easy 4-yard pass from Todd Collins (pass failed), 0:54. Chiefs 19–7. Drive: 7 plays, 91 yards, 3:43.

Fourth quarter

- CLE – Darnell Sanders 7-yard pass from Luke McCown (Phil Dawson kick), 3:40. Chiefs 19–14. Drive: 10 plays, 47 yards, 4:34.
- CLE – Richard Alston 34-yard pass from Luke McCown (Phil Dawson kick), 0:00. Browns 21–19. Drive: 8 plays, 80 yards, 1:39.

Top passers

- CLE – Luke McCown – 8/15, 109 yards, 2 TD
- KC – Trent Green – 12/22, 167 yards

Top rushers

- CLE – William Green – 3 rushes, 53 yards
- KC – Derrick Blaylock – 9 rushes, 34 yards

Top receivers

- CLE – C. J. Jones – 2 receptions, 38 yards
- KC – Chris Horn – 1 reception, 50 yards

==== Week 4: at Dallas Cowboys ====
Week 4: Kansas City Chiefs at Dallas Cowboys – Game summary

| Quarter | 1 | 2 | 3 | 4 | Total |
|---|---|---|---|---|---|
| Chiefs | 0 | 14 | 0 | 6 | 20 |
| Cowboys | 7 | 3 | 14 | 0 | 24 |

at Texas Stadium, Irving, Texas

- Date: September 2
- Game time: 7:00 p.m. CDT
- Game weather: Sunny, 87 °F (31 °C)
- Game attendance: 61,157
- Referee: Bill Leavy
- Recap, Game Book

Game information

First quarter

- DAL – Eddie George 3-yard run (Billy Cundiff kick), 5:47. Cowboys 7–0. Drive: 10 plays, 72 yards, 5:07.

Second quarter

- KC – Dante Hall 12-yard pass from Trent Green (Lawrence Tynes kick), 10:33. Tied 7–7. Drive: 12 plays, 71 yards, 6:57.
- KC – Richard Smith 53-yard pass from Todd Collins (Lawrence Tynes kick), 4:57. Chiefs 14–7. Drive: 6 plays, 90 yards, 2:52.
- DAL – Billy Cundiff 31-yard field goal, 0:15. Chiefs 14–10. Drive: 11 plays, 58 yards, 4:42.

Third quarter

- DAL – Antonio Bryant 15-yard pass from Tony Romo (Billy Cundiff kick), 8:02. Cowboys 17–14. Drive: 10 plays, 70 yards, 5:10.
- DAL – ReShard Lee 28-yard run (Billy Cundiff kick), 3:23. Cowboys 24–14. Drive: 7 plays, 65 yards, 3:10.

Fourth quarter

- KC – Lawrence Tynes 46-yard field goal, 14:11. Cowboys 24–17. Drive: 4 plays, 8 yards, 0:52.
- KC – Lawrence Tynes 27-yard field goal, 8:08. Cowboys 24–20. Drive: 9 plays, 53 yards, 4:24.

Top passers

- KC – Todd Collins – 5/5, 104 yards, TD
- DAL – Tony Romo – 12/14, 141 yards, TD

Top rushers

- KC – Derrick Blaylock – 10 rushes, 31 yards
- DAL – Richie Anderson – 4 rushes, 46 yards

Top receivers

- KC – Richard Smith – 3 receptions, 87 yards, TD
- DAL – Antonio Bryant – 4 receptions, 64 yards, TD

== Regular season ==
=== Schedule ===
| Week | Date | Opponent | Result | Record | Venue | Recap |
|---|---|---|---|---|---|---|
| 1 | September 12 | at **Denver Broncos** | **L** 24–34 | 0–1 | Invesco Field at Mile High | Recap |
| 2 | September 19 | Carolina Panthers | **L** 17–28 | 0–2 | Arrowhead Stadium | Recap |
| 3 | September 26 | Houston Texans | **L** 21–24 | 0–3 | Arrowhead Stadium | Recap |
| 4 | October 4 | at Baltimore Ravens | **W** 27–24 | 1–3 | M&T Bank Stadium | Recap |
| 5 | Bye | | | | | |
| 6 | October 17 | at Jacksonville Jaguars | **L** 16–22 | 1–4 | Alltel Stadium | Recap |
| 7 | October 24 | Atlanta Falcons | **W** 56–10 | 2–4 | Arrowhead Stadium | Recap |
| 8 | October 31 | Indianapolis Colts | **W** 45–35 | 3–4 | Arrowhead Stadium | Recap |
| 9 | November 7 | at Tampa Bay Buccaneers | **L** 31–34 | 3–5 | Raymond James Stadium | Recap |
| 10 | November 14 | at New Orleans Saints | **L** 20–27 | 3–6 | Louisiana Superdome | Recap |
| 11 | November 22 | New England Patriots | **L** 19–27 | 3–7 | Arrowhead Stadium | Recap |
| 12 | November 28 | **San Diego Chargers** | **L** 31–34 | 3–8 | Arrowhead Stadium | Recap |
| 13 | December 5 | at **Oakland Raiders** | **W** 34–27 | 4–8 | McAfee Coliseum | Recap |
| 14 | December 13 | at Tennessee Titans | **W** 49–38 | 5–8 | The Coliseum | Recap |
| 15 | December 19 | **Denver Broncos** | **W** 45–17 | 6–8 | Arrowhead Stadium | Recap |
| 16 | December 25 | **Oakland Raiders** | **W** 31–30 | 7–8 | Arrowhead Stadium | Recap |
| 17 | January 2 | at **San Diego Chargers** | **L** 17–24 | 7–9 | Qualcomm Stadium | Recap |
Note: Intra-division opponents are in **bold** text.

=== Game summaries ===
==== Week 1: at Denver Broncos ====
Week 1: Kansas City Chiefs at Denver Broncos – Game summary

| Quarter | 1 | 2 | 3 | 4 | Total |
|---|---|---|---|---|---|
| Chiefs | 7 | 0 | 17 | 0 | **24** |
| **Broncos** | 3 | 14 | 7 | 10 | **34** |

at Invesco Field at Mile High, Denver, Colorado

- Date: September 12
- Game time: 7:30 p.m. CDT/6:30 p.m. MDT
- Game weather: Cloudy, 82 °F (28 °C)
- Game attendance: 75,939
- Referee: Bernie Kukar
- TV announcers (ESPN): Pat Summerall, Joe Theismann, Paul Maguire and Suzy Kolber
- Recap, Game Book

Game information

**First quarter**

- KC – Priest Holmes 2-yard run (Lawrence Tynes kick), 10:46. Chiefs 7–0. **Drive: 8 plays, 80 yards, 4:14.**
- DEN – Jason Elam 43-yard field goal, 5:19. Chiefs 7–3. **Drive: 12 plays, 45 yards, 5:27.**

**Second quarter**

- DEN – Quentin Griffin 1-yard pass from Jake Plummer (Jason Elam kick), 13:07. Broncos 10–7. **Drive: 8 plays, 59 yards, 3:46.**
- DEN – Quentin Griffin 25-yard run (Jason Elam kick), 8:44. Broncos 17–7. **Drive: 6 plays, 50 yards, 3:15.**

**Third quarter**

- KC – Lawrence Tynes 50-yard field goal, 12:53. Broncos 17–10. **Drive: 4 plays, −1 yard, 1:54.**
- KC – Priest Holmes 4-yard run (Lawrence Tynes kick), 11:23. Tied 17–17. **Drive: 2 plays, 7 yards, 0:46.**
- DEN – Quentin Griffin 47-yard run (Jason Elam kick), 9:54. Broncos 24–17. **Drive: 3 plays, 77 yards, 1:29.**
- KC – Priest Holmes 33-yard run (Lawrence Tynes kick), 5:50. Tied 24–24. **Drive: 7 plays, 80 yards, 4:04.**

**Fourth quarter**

- DEN – Jason Elam 45-yard field goal, 13:21. Broncos 27–24. **Drive: 10 plays, 37 yards, 4:22.**
- DEN – Patrick Hape 2-yard pass from Jake Plummer (Jason Elam kick), 2:12. Broncos 34–24. **Drive: 13 plays, 87 yards, 7:10.**

**Top passers**

- KC – Trent Green – 16/32, 174 yards, INT
- DEN – Jake Plummer – 18/29, 230 yards, 2 TD, 2 INT

**Top rushers**

- KC – Priest Holmes – 26 rushes, 151 yards, 3 TD
- DEN – Quentin Griffin – 23 rushes, 156 yards, 2 TD

**Top receivers**

- KC – Eddie Kennison – 6 receptions, 101 yards
- DEN – Ashley Lelie – 4 receptions, 88 yards

==== Week 2: vs. Carolina Panthers ====
Week 2: Carolina Panthers at Kansas City Chiefs – Game summary

| Quarter | 1 | 2 | 3 | 4 | Total |
|---|---|---|---|---|---|
| **Panthers** | 7 | 0 | 7 | 14 | **28** |
| Chiefs | 3 | 7 | 7 | 0 | **17** |

at Arrowhead Stadium, Kansas City, Missouri

- Date: September 19
- Game time: 12:00 p.m. CDT
- Game weather: Clear, 80 °F (27 °C)
- Game attendance: 78,136
- Referee: Bill Vinovich
- TV announcers (Fox): Sam Rosen, Bill Maas and Chris Myers
- Recap, Game Book

Game information

**First quarter**

- KC – Lawrence Tynes 33-yard field goal, 10:09. Chiefs 3–0. **Drive: 9 plays, 68 yards, 4:51.**
- CAR – Kris Mangum 3-yard pass from Jake Delhomme (John Kasay kick), 1:10. Panthers 7–3. **Drive: 10 plays, 66 yards, 5:20.**

**Second quarter**

- KC – Priest Holmes 1-yard run (Lawrence Tynes kick), 12:34. Chiefs 10–7. **Drive: 7 plays, 69 yards, 3:36.**

**Third quarter**

- CAR – Keary Colbert 9-yard pass from Jake Delhomme (John Kasay kick), 6:47. Panthers 14–10. **Drive: 16 plays, 80 yards, 8:13.**
- KC – Eric Warfield 43-yard interception return (Lawrence Tynes kick), 3:34. Chiefs 17–14.

**Fourth quarter**

- CAR – Mike Seidman 1-yard pass from Jake Delhomme (John Kasay kick), 14:55. Panthers 21–17. **Drive: 8 plays, 56 yards, 3:39.**
- CAR – DeShaun Foster 3-yard run (John Kasay kick), 10:35. Panthers 28–17. **Drive: 2 plays, 74 yards, 0:52.**

**Top passers**

- CAR – Jake Delhomme – 16/29, 180 yards, 3 TD, 2 INT
- KC – Trent Green – 17/34, 187 yards, INT

**Top rushers**

- CAR – DeShaun Foster – 32 rushes, 174 yards, TD
- KC – Priest Holmes – 16 rushes, 66 yards, TD

**Top receivers**

- CAR – Ricky Proehl – 4 receptions, 48 yards
- KC – Johnnie Morton – 5 receptions, 76 yards

==== Week 3: vs. Houston Texans ====
Week 3: Houston Texans at Kansas City Chiefs – Game summary

| Quarter | 1 | 2 | 3 | 4 | Total |
|---|---|---|---|---|---|
| **Texans** | 0 | 6 | 8 | 10 | **24** |
| Chiefs | 7 | 0 | 7 | 7 | **21** |

at Arrowhead Stadium, Kansas City, Missouri

- Date: September 26
- Game time: 12:00 p.m. CDT
- Game weather: Clear, 71 °F (22 °C)
- Game attendance: 77,433
- Referee: Pete Morelli
- TV announcers (CBS): Kevin Harlan, Randy Cross and Marcus Allen
- Recap, Game Book

Game information

**First quarter**

- KC – Tony Gonzalez 14-yard pass from Trent Green (Lawrence Tynes kick), 5:35. Chiefs 7–0. **Drive: 9 plays, 80 yards, 4:39.**

**Second quarter**

- HOU – Kris Brown 28-yard field goal, 6:15. Chiefs 7–3. **Drive: 9 plays, 88 yards, 5:39.**
- HOU – Kris Brown 49-yard field goal, 0:10. Chiefs 7–6. **Drive: 10 plays, 64 yards, 1:42.**

**Third quarter**

- KC – Chris Horn 6-yard pass from Trent Green (Lawrence Tynes kick), 11:10. Chiefs 14–6. **Drive: 8 plays, 48 yards, 3:50.**
- HOU – Marcus Coleman 102-yard interception return (Jonathan Wells run), 3:51. Tied 14–14.

**Fourth quarter**

- KC – Jason Dunn 5-yard pass from Trent Green (Lawrence Tynes kick), 10:55. Chiefs 21–14. **Drive: 8 plays, 54 yards, 3:59.**
- HOU – Jabar Gaffney 9-yard pass from David Carr (Kris Brown kick), 5:20. Tied 21–21. **Drive: 10 plays, 68 yards, 5:35.**
- HOU – Kris Brown 49-yard field goal, 0:02. Texans 24–21. **Drive: 7 plays, 42 yards, 2:16.**

**Top passers**

- HOU – David Carr – 13/25, 233 yards, TD, INT
- KC – Trent Green – 21/30, 226 yards, 3 TD, INT

**Top rushers**

- HOU – Jonathan Wells – 10 rushes, 37 yards
- KC – Priest Holmes – 32 rushes, 134 yards

**Top receivers**

- HOU – Andre Johnson – 4 receptions, 96 yards
- KC – Tony Gonzalez – 8 receptions, 106 yards, TD

==== Week 4: at Baltimore Ravens ====
Week 4: Kansas City Chiefs at Baltimore Ravens – Game summary

| Quarter | 1 | 2 | 3 | 4 | Total |
|---|---|---|---|---|---|
| **Chiefs** | 10 | 7 | 3 | 7 | **27** |
| Ravens | 3 | 14 | 0 | 7 | **24** |

at M&T Bank Stadium, Baltimore, Maryland

- Date: October 4
- Game time: 9:00 p.m. EDT/8:00 p.m. CDT
- Game weather: Nice, 66 °F (19 °C)
- Game attendance: 69,827
- Referee: Jeff Triplette
- TV announcers (ABC): Al Michaels, John Madden and Michele Tafoya
- Recap, Game Book

Game information

**First quarter**

- BAL – Matt Stover 50-yard field goal, 11:09. Ravens 3–0. **Drive: 8 plays, 36 yards, 4:51.**
- KC – Jason Dunn 3-yard pass from Trent Green (Lawrence Tynes kick), 6:13. Chiefs 7–3. **Drive: 10 plays, 60 yards, 4:56.**
- KC – Lawrence Tynes 42-yard field goal, 0:15. Chiefs 10–3. **Drive: 9 plays, 53 yards, 4:53.**

**Second quarter**

- BAL – Randy Hymes 57-yard pass from Kyle Boller (Matt Stover kick), 11:50. Tied 10–10. **Drive: 1 play, 57 yards, 0:10.**
- KC – Priest Holmes 4-yard run (Lawrence Tynes kick), 3:42. Chiefs 17–10. **Drive: 14 plays, 79 yards, 8:08.**
- BAL – B. J. Sams 58-yard punt return (Matt Stover kick), 1:30. Tied 17–17.

**Third quarter**

- KC – Lawrence Tynes 38-yard field goal, 8:19. Chiefs 20–17. **Drive: 12 plays, 60 yards, 6:41.**

**Fourth quarter**

- KC – Priest Holmes 1-yard run (Lawrence Tynes kick), 14:52. Chiefs 27–17. **Drive: 13 plays, 80 yards, 5:36.**
- BAL – Jamal Lewis 1-yard run (Matt Stover kick), 9:14. Chiefs 27–24. **Drive: 9 plays, 62 yards, 5:43.**

**Top passers**

- KC – Trent Green – 21/31, 223 yards, TD
- BAL – Kyle Boller – 10/17, 154 yards, TD

**Top rushers**

- KC – Priest Holmes – 33 rushes, 125 yards, 2 TD
- BAL – Jamal Lewis – 15 rushes, 73 yards, TD

**Top receivers**

- KC – Johnnie Morton – 5 receptions, 64 yards
- BAL – Randy Hymes – 2 receptions, 68 yards, TD

==== Week 6: at Jacksonville Jaguars ====
Week 6: Kansas City Chiefs at Jacksonville Jaguars – Game summary

| Quarter | 1 | 2 | 3 | 4 | Total |
|---|---|---|---|---|---|
| Chiefs | 3 | 0 | 7 | 6 | **16** |
| **Jaguars** | 7 | 7 | 0 | 8 | **22** |

at Alltel Stadium, Jacksonville, Florida

- Date: October 17
- Game time: 1:00 p.m. EDT/12:00 p.m. CDT
- Game weather: 78 °F (26 °C)
- Game attendance: 66,413
- Referee: Ed Hochuli
- TV announcers (CBS): Kevin Harlan and Randy Cross
- Recap, Game Book

Game information

**First quarter**

- JAX – Byron Leftwich 7-yard run (Josh Scobee kick), 8:34. Jaguars 7–0. **Drive: 13 plays, 75 yards, 6:26.**
- KC – Lawrence Tynes 31-yard field goal, 2:02. Jaguars 7–3. **Drive: 5 plays, 53 yards, 2:30.**

**Second quarter**

- JAX – Fred Taylor 64-yard pass from Byron Leftwich (Josh Scobee kick), 14:08. Jaguars 14–3. **Drive: 5 plays, 79 yards, 2:54.**

**Third quarter**

- KC – Tony Gonzalez 24-yard pass from Trent Green (Lawrence Tynes kick), 10:46. Jaguars 14–10. **Drive: 8 plays, 68 yards, 4:14.**

**Fourth quarter**

- KC – Priest Holmes 28-yard pass from Trent Green (kick failed, hit right upright), 4:45. Chiefs 16–14. **Drive: 9 plays, 75 yards, 4:45.**
- JAX – Cortez Hankton 14-yard pass from Byron Leftwich (Byron Leftwich–Reggie Williams pass), 0:45. Jaguars 22–16. **Drive: 8 plays, 67 yards, 1:31.**

**Top passers**

- KC – Trent Green – 23/33, 315 yards, 2 TD, INT
- JAX – Byron Leftwich – 24/36, 298 yards, 2 TD

**Top rushers**

- KC – Priest Holmes – 19 rushes, 75 yards
- JAX – Fred Taylor – 19 rushes, 66 yards

**Top receivers**

- KC – Johnnie Morton – 7 receptions, 111 yards
- JAX – Jimmy Smith – 7 receptions, 91 yards

==== Week 7: vs. Atlanta Falcons ====
Week 7: Atlanta Falcons at Kansas City Chiefs – Game summary

| Quarter | 1 | 2 | 3 | 4 | Total |
|---|---|---|---|---|---|
| Falcons | 3 | 0 | 7 | 0 | **10** |
| **Chiefs** | 14 | 21 | 7 | 14 | **56** |

at Arrowhead Stadium, Kansas City, Missouri

- Date: October 24
- Game time: 12:00 p.m. CDT
- Game weather: Clear, 69 °F (21 °C)
- Game attendance: 78,260
- Referee: Tony Corrente
- TV announcers (Fox): Curt Menefee, Tim Green and Al Wallace
- Recap, Game Book

Game information

**First quarter**

- ATL – Jay Feely 19-yard field goal, 12:13. Falcons 3–0. **Drive: 8 plays, 62 yards, 2:47.**
- KC – Priest Holmes 15-yard run (Lawrence Tynes kick), 8:03. Chiefs 7–3. **Drive: 7 plays, 68 yards, 3:12.**
- KC – Derrick Blaylock 7-yard run (Lawrence Tynes kick), 1:08. Chiefs 14–3. **Drive: 3 plays, 51 yards, 1:27.**

**Second quarter**

- KC – Priest Holmes 2-yard run (Lawrence Tynes kick), 7:25. Chiefs 21–3. **Drive: 12 plays, 73 yards, 7:23.**
- KC – Priest Holmes 2-yard run (Lawrence Tynes kick), 3:17. Chiefs 28–3. **Drive: 5 plays, 56 yards, 2:30.**
- KC – Priest Holmes 1-yard run (Lawrence Tynes kick), 0:00. Chiefs 35–3. **Drive: 3 plays, 16 yards, 0:15.**

**Third quarter**

- ATL – Allen Rossum 75-yard punt return (Jay Feely kick), 12:28. Chiefs 35–10.
- KC – Derrick Blaylock 1-yard run (Lawrence Tynes kick), 6:40. Chiefs 42–10. **Drive: 11 plays, 80 yards, 5:48.**

**Fourth quarter**

- KC – Derrick Blaylock 3-yard run (Lawrence Tynes kick), 14:07. Chiefs 49–10. **Drive: 8 plays, 76 yards, 4:19.**
- KC – Derrick Blaylock 2-yard run (Lawrence Tynes kick), 1:59. Chiefs 56–10. **Drive: 9 plays, 44 yards, 5:02.**

**Top passers**

- ATL – Michael Vick – 7/21, 119 yards, 2 INT
- KC – Trent Green – 20/27, 269 yards

**Top rushers**

- ATL – Michael Vick – 6 rushes, 62 yards
- KC – Priest Holmes – 22 rushes, 139 yards, 4 TD

**Top receivers**

- ATL – Warrick Dunn – 2 receptions, 72 yards
- KC – Eddie Kennison – 3 receptions, 52 yards

The Chiefs made NFL history in this game, as they set a record by having 8 rushing touchdowns, the most in a single game in the Super Bowl Era.

==== Week 8: vs. Indianapolis Colts ====
Week 8: Indianapolis Colts at Kansas City Chiefs – Game summary

| Quarter | 1 | 2 | 3 | 4 | Total |
|---|---|---|---|---|---|
| Colts | 7 | 7 | 14 | 7 | **35** |
| **Chiefs** | 7 | 24 | 0 | 14 | **45** |

at Arrowhead Stadium, Kansas City, Missouri

- Date: October 31
- Game time: 12:00 p.m. CST
- Game weather: Clear, 67 °F (19 °C)
- Game attendance: 78,312
- Referee: Mike Carey
- TV announcers (CBS): Kevin Harlan and Randy Cross
- Recap, Game Book

Game information

**First quarter**

- IND – Marvin Harrison 52-yard pass from Peyton Manning (Mike Vanderjagt kick), 4:18. Colts 7–0. **Drive: 8 plays, 96 yards, 4:21.**
- KC – Tony Gonzalez 21-yard pass from Trent Green (Lawrence Tynes kick), 1:27. Tied 7–7. **Drive: 6 plays, 71 yards, 2:51.**

**Second quarter**

- KC – Johnnie Morton 7-yard pass from Trent Green (Lawrence Tynes kick), 14:20. Chiefs 14–7. **Drive: 3 plays, 12 yards, 0:50.**
- KC – Priest Holmes 21-yard run (Lawrence Tynes kick), 9:08. Chiefs 21–7. **Drive: 5 plays, 83 yards, 3:04.**
- IND – Marcus Pollard 5-yard pass from Peyton Manning (Mike Vanderjagt kick), 6:03. Chiefs 21–14. **Drive: 5 plays, 70 yards, 3:05.**
- KC – Priest Holmes 11-yard run (Lawrence Tynes kick), 4:59. Chiefs 28–14. **Drive: 2 plays, 63 yards, 1:04.**
- KC – Lawrence Tynes 32-yard field goal, 0:47. Chiefs 31–14. **Drive: 9 plays, 80 yards, 2:36.**

**Third quarter**

- IND – Marvin Harrison 22-yard pass from Peyton Manning (Mike Vanderjagt kick), 11:43. Chiefs 31–21. **Drive: 3 plays, 92 yards, 1:05.**
- IND – Reggie Wayne 41-yard pass from Peyton Manning (Mike Vanderjagt kick), 4:16. Chiefs 31–28. **Drive: 3 plays, 76 yards, 1:37.**

**Fourth quarter**

- KC – Priest Holmes 1-yard run (Lawrence Tynes kick), 12:58. Chiefs 38–28. **Drive: 11 plays, 63 yards, 6:18.**
- IND – Reggie Wayne 6-yard pass from Peyton Manning (Mike Vanderjagt kick), 5:27. Chiefs 38–35. **Drive: 8 plays, 76 yards, 2:58.**
- KC – Tony Gonzalez 14-yard pass from Trent Green (Lawrence Tynes kick), 2:17. Chiefs 45–35. **Drive: 8 plays, 70 yards, 3:10.**

**Top passers**

- IND – Peyton Manning – 25/44, 472 yards, 5 TD, INT
- KC – Trent Green – 27/34, 389 yards, 3 TD

**Top rushers**

- IND – Edgerrin James – 10 rushes, 34 yards
- KC – Priest Holmes – 32 rushes, 143 yards, 3 TD

**Top receivers**

- IND – Reggie Wayne – 6 receptions, 119 yards, 2 TD
- KC – Tony Gonzalez – 8 receptions, 125 yards, 2 TD

==== Week 9: at Tampa Bay Buccaneers ====
Week 9: Kansas City Chiefs at Tampa Bay Buccaneers – Game summary

| Quarter | 1 | 2 | 3 | 4 | Total |
|---|---|---|---|---|---|
| Chiefs | 7 | 17 | 7 | 0 | **31** |
| **Buccaneers** | 7 | 14 | 7 | 6 | **34** |

at Raymond James Stadium, Tampa, Florida

- Date: November 7
- Game time: 1:00 p.m. EST/12:00 p.m. CST
- Game weather: Sunny, 76 °F (24 °C)
- Game attendance: 65,495
- Referee: Ron Winter
- TV announcers (CBS): Gus Johnson and Brent Jones
- Recap, Game Book

Game information

**First quarter**

- KC – Johnnie Morton 25-yard pass from Trent Green (Lawrence Tynes kick), 9:42. Chiefs 7–0. **Drive: 10 plays, 77 yards, 5:18.**
- TB – Jameel Cook 8-yard pass from Brian Griese (Martín Gramática kick), 7:39. Tied 7–7. **Drive: 4 plays, 73 yards, 2:03.**

**Second quarter**

- TB – Michael Pittman 1-yard run (Martín Gramática kick), 13:49. Buccaneers 14–7. **Drive: 11 plays, 71 yards, 5:07.**
- KC – Priest Holmes 2-yard run (Lawrence Tynes kick), 9:05. Tied 14–14. **Drive: 10 plays, 60 yards, 4:44.**
- KC – Lawrence Tynes 31-yard field goal, 6:25. Chiefs 17–14. **Drive: 5 plays, 19 yards, 1:57.**
- TB – Ken Dilger 3-yard pass from Brian Griese (Martín Gramática kick), 1:55. Buccaneers 21–17. **Drive: 8 plays, 67 yards, 4:30.**
- KC – Tony Gonzalez 23-yard pass from Trent Green (Lawrence Tynes kick), 0:35. Chiefs 24–21. **Drive: 6 plays, 64 yards, 1:20.**

**Third quarter**

- TB – Michael Pittman 78-yard run (Martín Gramática kick), 14:00. Buccaneers 28–24. **Drive: 2 plays, 80 yards, 1:00.**
- KC – Jason Dunn 1-yard pass from Trent Green (Lawrence Tynes kick), 2:13. Chiefs 31–28. **Drive: 8 plays, 80 yards, 4:25.**

**Fourth quarter**

- TB – Michael Pittman 3-yard run (kick failed, wide left), 11:50. Buccaneers 34–31. **Drive: 9 plays, 80 yards, 5:23.**

**Top passers**

- KC – Trent Green – 32/42, 369 yards, 3 TD, 2 INT
- TB – Brian Griese – 22/34, 296 yards, 2 TD

**Top rushers**

- KC – Priest Holmes – 16 rushes, 59 yards, TD
- TB – Michael Pittman – 15 rushes, 128 yards, 3 TD

**Top receivers**

- KC – Tony Gonzalez – 9 receptions, 123 yards, TD
- TB – Michael Clayton – 5 receptions, 90 yards

==== Week 10: at New Orleans Saints ====
Week 10: Kansas City Chiefs at New Orleans Saints – Game summary

| Quarter | 1 | 2 | 3 | 4 | Total |
|---|---|---|---|---|---|
| Chiefs | 10 | 3 | 0 | 7 | **20** |
| **Saints** | 0 | 14 | 3 | 10 | **27** |

at Louisiana Superdome, New Orleans, Louisiana

- Date: November 14
- Game time: 12:00 p.m. CST
- Game weather: None (indoor stadium)
- Game attendance: 64,900
- Referee: Larry Nemmers
- TV announcers (CBS): Gus Johnson and Brent Jones
- Recap, Game Book

Game information

**First quarter**

- KC – Eddie Kennison 21-yard pass from Trent Green (Lawrence Tynes kick), 12:49. Chiefs 7–0. **Drive: 5 plays, 35 yards, 2:11.**
- KC – Lawrence Tynes 24-yard field goal, 2:27. Chiefs 10–0. **Drive: 13 plays, 60 yards, 6:43.**

**Second quarter**

- NO – Aaron Brooks 1-yard run (John Carney kick), 14:54. Saints 10–7. **Drive: 6 plays, 68 yards, 2:33.**
- NO – Deuce McAllister 13-yard run (John Carney kick), 9:41. Saints 14–10. **Drive: 5 plays, 89 yards, 2:03.**
- KC – Lawrence Tynes 44-yard field goal, 6:04. Saints 14–13. **Drive: 8 plays, 38 yards, 3:37.**

**Third quarter**

- NO – John Carney 39-yard field goal, 10:05. Saints 17–13. **Drive: 10 plays, 52 yards, 4:55.**

**Fourth quarter**

- NO – John Carney 38-yard field goal, 13:41. Saints 20–13. **Drive: 6 plays, 29 yards, 2:59.**
- KC – Derrick Blaylock 3-yard run (Lawrence Tynes kick), 8:07. Tied 20–20. **Drive: 9 plays, 78 yards, 5:34.**
- NO – Joe Horn 42-yard pass from Aaron Brooks (John Carney kick), 5:28. Saints 27–20. **Drive: 5 plays, 72 yards, 2:39.**

**Top passers**

- KC – Trent Green – 22/33, 311 yards, TD, 2 INT
- NO – Aaron Brooks – 15/27, 159 yards, TD, INT

**Top rushers**

- KC – Derrick Blaylock – 33 rushes, 186 yards, TD
- NO – Deuce McAllister – 16 rushes, 127 yards, TD

**Top receivers**

- KC – Eddie Kennison – 7 receptions, 121 yards, TD
- NO – Joe Horn – 5 receptions, 167 yards, TD

==== Week 11: vs. New England Patriots ====
Week 11: New England Patriots at Kansas City Chiefs – Game summary

| Quarter | 1 | 2 | 3 | 4 | Total |
|---|---|---|---|---|---|
| **Patriots** | 7 | 10 | 7 | 3 | **27** |
| Chiefs | 10 | 0 | 3 | 6 | **19** |

at Arrowhead Stadium, Kansas City, Missouri

- Date: November 22
- Game time: 8:00 p.m. CST
- Game weather: Overcast, 45 °F (7 °C)
- Game attendance: 78,431
- Referee: Bill Leavy
- TV announcers (ABC): Al Michaels, John Madden and Michele Tafoya
- Recap, Game Book

Game information

**First quarter**

- NE – Corey Dillon 5-yard run (Adam Vinatieri kick), 10:29. Patriots 7–0. **Drive: 10 plays, 71 yards, 4:31.**
- KC – Lawrence Tynes 44-yard field goal, 7:47. Patriots 7–3. **Drive: 5 plays, 30 yards, 2:42.**
- KC – Eddie Kennison 65-yard pass from Trent Green (Lawrence Tynes kick), 3:41. Chiefs 10–7. **Drive: 5 plays, 84 yards, 2:34.**

**Second quarter**

- NE – Corey Dillon 1-yard run (Adam Vinatieri kick), 8:27. Patriots 14–10. **Drive: 10 plays, 75 yards, 4:35.**
- NE – Adam Vinatieri 37-yard field goal, 3:52. Patriots 17–10. **Drive: 6 plays, 37 yards, 2:19.**

**Third quarter**

- KC – Lawrence Tynes 44-yard field goal, 6:45. Patriots 17–13. **Drive: 15 plays, 68 yards, 8:15.**
- NE – Deion Branch 26-yard pass from Tom Brady (Adam Vinatieri kick), 4:54. Patriots 24–13. **Drive: 4 plays, 75 yards, 1:51.**

**Fourth quarter**

- KC – Eddie Kennison 26-yard pass from Trent Green (pass failed), 6:13. Patriots 24–19. **Drive: 11 plays, 97 yards, 5:45.**
- NE – Adam Vinatieri 28-yard field goal, 1:46. Patriots 27–19. **Drive: 11 plays, 54 yards, 4:27.**

**Top passers**

- NE – Tom Brady – 17/26, 315 yards, TD
- KC – Trent Green – 27/42, 383 yards, 2 TD, INT

**Top rushers**

- NE – Corey Dillon – 26 rushes, 98 yards, 2 TD
- KC – Derrick Blaylock – 19 rushes, 58 yards

**Top receivers**

- NE – Deion Branch – 6 receptions, 105 yards, TD
- KC – Johnnie Morton – 5 receptions, 107 yards

The loss ended the Chiefs' seven-game home unbeaten streak against the Patriots, losing to them at home for the first time since the 1964 season.

==== Week 12: vs. San Diego Chargers ====
Week 12: San Diego Chargers at Kansas City Chiefs – Game summary

| Quarter | 1 | 2 | 3 | 4 | Total |
|---|---|---|---|---|---|
| **Chargers** | 7 | 7 | 3 | 17 | **34** |
| Chiefs | 7 | 10 | 0 | 14 | **31** |

at Arrowhead Stadium, Kansas City, Missouri

- Date: November 28
- Game time: 12:00 p.m. CST
- Game weather: Overcast, 35 °F (2 °C)
- Game attendance: 77,447
- Referee: Bill Vinovich
- TV announcers (CBS): Kevin Harlan and Randy Cross
- Recap, Game Book

Game information

**First quarter**

- SD – LaDainian Tomlinson 1-yard run (Nate Kaeding kick), 7:01. Chargers 7–0. **Drive: 3 plays, 57 yards, 1:00.**
- KC – Derrick Blaylock 5-yard run (Lawrence Tynes kick), 4:26. Tied 7–7. **Drive: 6 plays, 60 yards, 2:35.**

**Second quarter**

- KC – Larry Johnson 7-yard run (Lawrence Tynes kick), 9:05. Chiefs 14–7. **Drive: 13 plays, 94 yards, 6:00.**
- SD – LaDainian Tomlinson 3-yard run (Nate Kaeding kick), 3:11. Tied 14–14. **Drive: 12 plays, 65 yards, 5:54.**
- KC – Lawrence Tynes 28-yard field goal, 0:45. Chiefs 17–14. **Drive: 11 plays, 58 yards, 2:26.**

**Third quarter**

- SD – Nate Kaeding 25-yard field goal, 7:24. Tied 17–17. **Drive: 5 plays, 43 yards, 2:15.**

**Fourth quarter**

- KC – Derrick Blaylock 22-yard run (kick failed, wide right), 14:17. Chiefs 23–17. **Drive: 9 plays, 84 yards, 4:29.**
- SD – Antonio Gates 18-yard pass from Drew Brees (Nate Kaeding kick), 10:13. Chargers 24–23. **Drive: 6 plays, 71 yards, 4:04.**
- KC – Dante Hall 96-yard kickoff return (Trent Green–Eddie Kennison pass), 10:00. Chiefs 31–24.
- SD – Antonio Gates 11-yard pass from Drew Brees (Nate Kaeding kick), 6:21. Tied 31–31. **Drive: 5 plays, 69 yards, 3:38.**
- SD – Nate Kaeding 43-yard field goal, 2:24. Chargers 34–31. **Drive: 7 plays, 8 yards, 2:26.**

**Top passers**

- SD – Drew Brees – 28/37, 378 yards, 2 TD
- KC – Trent Green – 21/34, 208 yards, INT

**Top rushers**

- SD – Eric Parker – 2 rushes, 58 yards
- KC – Derrick Blaylock – 8 rushes, 57 yards, 2 TD

**Top receivers**

- SD – Antonio Gates – 7 receptions, 92 yards, 2 TD
- KC – Tony Gonzalez – 8 receptions, 105 yards

==== Week 13: at Oakland Raiders ====
Week 13: Kansas City Chiefs at Oakland Raiders – Game summary

| Quarter | 1 | 2 | 3 | 4 | Total |
|---|---|---|---|---|---|
| **Chiefs** | 7 | 3 | 14 | 10 | **34** |
| Raiders | 6 | 14 | 0 | 7 | **27** |

at McAfee Coliseum, Oakland, California

- Date: December 5
- Game time: 3:05 p.m. CST/1:05 p.m. PST
- Game weather: Mostly sunny, 50 °F (10 °C)
- Game attendance: 51,292
- Referee: Ed Hochuli
- TV announcers (CBS): Bill Macatee and Steve Beuerlein
- Recap, Game Book

Game information

**First quarter**

- OAK – Sebastian Janikowski 27-yard field goal, 11:03. Raiders 3–0. **Drive: 9 plays, 59 yards, 3:57.**
- KC – Derrick Blaylock 20-yard pass from Trent Green (Lawrence Tynes kick), 4:18. Chiefs 7–3. **Drive: 10 plays, 65 yards, 2:35.**
- OAK – Sebastian Janikowski 36-yard field goal, 1:06. Chiefs 7–6. **Drive: 9 plays, 41 yards, 1:32.**

**Second quarter**

- OAK – Ronald Curry 34-yard pass from Kerry Collins (Sebastian Janikowski kick), 9:00. Raiders 13–7. **Drive: 3 plays, 52 yards, 1:33.**
- OAK – Jerry Porter 51-yard pass from Kerry Collins (Sebastian Janikowski kick), 5:58. Raiders 20–7. **Drive: 3 plays, 57 yards, 1:32.**
- KC – Lawrence Tynes 28-yard field goal, 0:14. Raiders 20–10. **Drive: 17 plays, 70 yards, 5:44.**

**Third quarter**

- KC – Larry Johnson 5-yard run (Lawrence Tynes kick), 10:23. Raiders 20–17. **Drive: 5 plays, 43 yards, 2:15.**
- KC – Larry Johnson 10-yard pass from Trent Green (Lawrence Tynes kick), 4:16. Chiefs 24–20. **Drive: 7 plays, 80 yards, 3:27.**

**Fourth quarter**

- OAK – Ronald Curry 26-yard pass from Kerry Collins (Sebastian Janikowski kick), 14:13. Raiders 27–24. **Drive: 9 plays, 75 yards, 5:03.**
- KC – Lawrence Tynes 22-yard field goal, 6:59. Tied 27–27. **Drive: 13 plays, 74 yards, 7:14.**
- KC – Eddie Kennison 70-yard pass from Trent Green (Lawrence Tynes kick), 2:04. Chiefs 34–27. **Drive: 5 plays, 88 yards, 1:57.**

**Top passers**

- KC – Trent Green – 23/35, 340 yards, 3 TD, INT
- OAK – Kerry Collins – 27/41, 343 yards, 3 TD

**Top rushers**

- KC – Larry Johnson – 20 rushes, 118 yards, TD
- OAK – Amos Zereoué – 4 rushes, 15 yards

**Top receivers**

- KC – Eddie Kennison – 8 receptions, 149 yards, TD
- OAK – Ronald Curry – 9 receptions, 141 yards, 2 TD

==== Week 14: at Tennessee Titans ====
Week 14: Kansas City Chiefs at Tennessee Titans – Game summary

| Quarter | 1 | 2 | 3 | 4 | Total |
|---|---|---|---|---|---|
| **Chiefs** | 0 | 14 | 14 | 21 | **49** |
| Titans | 7 | 14 | 7 | 10 | **38** |

at The Coliseum, Nashville, Tennessee

- Date: December 13
- Game time: 8:00 p.m. CST
- Game weather: Cold and clear, 37 °F (3 °C)
- Game attendance: 68,932
- Referee: Tom White
- TV announcers (ABC): Al Michaels, John Madden and Michele Tafoya
- Recap, Game Book

Game information

**First quarter**

- TEN – Chris Brown 1-yard run (Gary Anderson kick), 7:19. Titans 7–0. **Drive: 7 plays, 71 yards, 3:00.**

**Second quarter**

- TEN – Drew Bennett 42-yard pass from Billy Volek (Gary Anderson kick), 13:27. Titans 14–0. **Drive: 3 plays, 80 yards, 3:03.**
- KC – Eddie Kennison 58-yard pass from Trent Green (Lawrence Tynes kick), 12:28. Titans 14–7. **Drive: 3 plays, 70 yards, 0:59.**
- KC – Johnnie Morton 30-yard pass from Trent Green (Lawrence Tynes kick), 1:17. Tied 14–14. **Drive: 6 plays, 60 yards, 1:00.**
- TEN – Drew Bennett 22-yard pass from Billy Volek (Gary Anderson kick), 0:09. Titans 21–14. **Drive: 5 plays, 80 yards, 1:08.**

**Third quarter**

- KC – Derrick Blaylock 5-yard run (Lawrence Tynes kick), 10:26. Tied 21–21. **Drive: 9 plays, 56 yards, 4:34.**
- TEN – Drew Bennett 7-yard pass from Billy Volek (Gary Anderson kick), 7:22. Titans 28–21. **Drive: 6 plays, 75 yards, 3:04.**
- KC – Larry Johnson 46-yard run (Lawrence Tynes kick), 6:29. Tied 28–28. **Drive: 2 plays, 61 yards, 0:53.**

**Fourth quarter**

- KC – Larry Johnson 41-yard run (Lawrence Tynes kick), 4:49. Chiefs 35–28. **Drive: 6 plays, 81 yards, 2:46.**
- TEN – Derrick Mason 4-yard pass from Billy Volek (Gary Anderson kick), 2:26. Tied 35–35. **Drive: 9 plays, 6 yards, 2:53.**
- TEN – Gary Anderson 27-yard field goal, 1:39. Titans 38–35. **Drive: 4 plays, 8 yards, 0:26.**
- KC – Eddie Kennison 9-yard pass from Trent Green (Lawrence Tynes kick), 0:32. Chiefs 42–38. **Drive: 7 plays, 64 yards, 1:07.**
- KC – Kawika Mitchell 39-yard fumble return (Lawrence Tynes kick), 0:08. Chiefs 49–38.

**Top passers**

- KC – Trent Green – 18/32, 244 yards, 3 TD, INT
- TEN – Billy Volek – 29/43, 426 yards, 4 TD

**Top rushers**

- KC – Larry Johnson – 7 rushes, 104 yards, 2 TD
- TEN – Chris Brown – 15 rushes, 91 yards, TD

**Top receivers**

- KC – Tony Gonzalez – 7 receptions, 76 yards
- TEN – Drew Bennett – 12 receptions, 233 yards, 3 TD

==== Week 15: vs. Denver Broncos ====
Week 15: Denver Broncos at Kansas City Chiefs – Game summary

| Quarter | 1 | 2 | 3 | 4 | Total |
|---|---|---|---|---|---|
| Broncos | 7 | 3 | 0 | 7 | **17** |
| **Chiefs** | 14 | 14 | 7 | 10 | **45** |

at Arrowhead Stadium, Kansas City, Missouri

- Date: December 19
- Game time: 12:00 p.m. CST
- Game weather: Clear, 15 °F (−9 °C)
- Game attendance: 77,702
- Referee: Tony Corrente
- TV announcers (CBS): Kevin Harlan and Randy Cross
- Recap, Game Book

Game information

**First quarter**

- KC – Dante Hall 97-yard kickoff return (Lawrence Tynes kick), 14:47. Chiefs 7–0.
- KC – Larry Johnson 5-yard run (Lawrence Tynes kick), 4:49. Chiefs 14–0. **Drive: 11 plays, 87 yards, 6:26.**
- DEN – Rod Smith 22-yard pass from Jake Plummer (Jason Elam kick), 0:02. Chiefs 14–7. **Drive: 9 plays, 64 yards, 4:47.**

**Second quarter**

- KC – Eddie Kennison 7-yard pass from Trent Green (Lawrence Tynes kick), 9:36. Chiefs 21–7. **Drive: 6 plays, 44 yards, 2:34.**
- KC – Larry Johnson 32-yard run (Lawrence Tynes kick), 4:06. Chiefs 28–7. **Drive: 6 plays, 58 yards, 2:46.**
- DEN – Jason Elam 27-yard field goal, 0:04. Chiefs 28–10. **Drive: 9 plays, 70 yards, 1:47.**

**Third quarter**

- KC – Samie Parker 48-yard pass from Trent Green (Lawrence Tynes kick), 8:11. Chiefs 35–10. **Drive: 9 plays, 90 yards, 5:21.**

**Fourth quarter**

- KC – Eddie Kennison 18-yard pass from Trent Green (Lawrence Tynes kick), 14:13. Chiefs 42–10. **Drive: 10 plays, 99 yards, 6:05.**
- KC – Lawrence Tynes 39-yard field goal, 5:31. Chiefs 45–10. **Drive: 5 plays, 46 yards, 1:12.**
- DEN – Garrison Hearst 4-yard run (Jason Elam kick), 4:13. Chiefs 45–17. **Drive: 6 plays, 61 yards, 1:18.**

**Top passers**

- DEN – Jake Plummer – 23/41, 292 yards, TD, 2 INT
- KC – Trent Green – 16/19, 224 yards, 3 TD

**Top rushers**

- DEN – Tatum Bell – 9 rushes, 50 yards
- KC – Larry Johnson – 30 rushes, 151 yards, 2 TD

**Top receivers**

- DEN – Rod Smith – 6 receptions, 75 yards, TD
- KC – Eddie Kennison – 7 receptions, 101 yards, 2 TD

==== Week 16: vs. Oakland Raiders ====
Christmas Day games

Week 16: Oakland Raiders at Kansas City Chiefs – Game summary

| Quarter | 1 | 2 | 3 | 4 | Total |
|---|---|---|---|---|---|
| Raiders | 7 | 14 | 3 | 6 | **30** |
| **Chiefs** | 7 | 14 | 0 | 10 | **31** |

at Arrowhead Stadium, Kansas City, Missouri

- Date: December 25
- Game time: 4:00 p.m. CST
- Game weather: Clear, 43 °F (6 °C)
- Game attendance: 77,289
- Referee: Larry Nemmers
- TV announcers (CBS): Dick Enberg, Dan Dierdorf and Armen Keteyian
- Recap, Game Book

Game information

**First quarter**

- OAK – Jerry Porter 5-yard pass from Kerry Collins (Sebastian Janikowski kick), 13:25. Raiders 7–0. **Drive: 3 plays, 10 yards, 0:50.**
- KC – Larry Johnson 6-yard run (Lawrence Tynes kick), 2:14. Tied 7–7. **Drive: 10 plays, 68 yards, 5:27.**

**Second quarter**

- OAK – Zack Crockett 3-yard run (Sebastian Janikowski kick), 11:40. Raiders 14–7. **Drive: 10 plays, 62 yards, 5:34.**
- KC – Tony Gonzalez 2-yard pass from Trent Green (Lawrence Tynes kick), 6:44. Tied 14–14. **Drive: 9 plays, 44 yards, 4:56.**
- KC – Tony Gonzalez 26-yard pass from Trent Green (Lawrence Tynes kick), 1:54. Chiefs 21–14. **Drive: 10 plays, 88 yards, 3:58.**
- OAK – Alvis Whitted 32-yard pass from Kerry Collins (Sebastian Janikowski kick), 0:24. Tied 21–21. **Drive: 7 plays, 69 yards, 1:30.**

**Third quarter**

- OAK – Sebastian Janikowski 40-yard field goal, 0:09. Raiders 24–21. **Drive: 9 plays, 50 yards, 4:49.**

**Fourth quarter**

- KC – Larry Johnson 4-yard run (Lawrence Tynes kick), 6:11. Chiefs 28–24. **Drive: 10 plays, 65 yards, 5:03.**
- OAK – Sebastian Janikowski 45-yard field goal, 3:49. Chiefs 28–27. **Drive: 6 plays, 43 yards, 2:22.**
- OAK – Sebastian Janikowski 46-yard field goal, 1:03. Raiders 30–28. **Drive: 7 plays, 29 yards, 0:39.**
- KC – Lawrence Tynes 38-yard field goal, 0:22. Chiefs 31–30. **Drive: 6 plays, 16 yards, 0:41.**

**Top passers**

- OAK – Kerry Collins – 18/37, 217 yards, 2 TD, INT
- KC – Trent Green – 32/45, 358 yards, 2 TD, INT

**Top rushers**

- OAK – Justin Fargas – 6 rushes, 38 yards
- KC – Larry Johnson – 25 rushes, 79 yards, 2 TD

**Top receivers**

- OAK – Jerry Porter – 4 receptions, 57 yards, TD
- KC – Tony Gonzalez – 11 receptions, 124 yards, 2 TD

==== Week 17: at San Diego Chargers ====
Week 17: Kansas City Chiefs at San Diego Chargers – Game summary

| Quarter | 1 | 2 | 3 | 4 | Total |
|---|---|---|---|---|---|
| Chiefs | 0 | 3 | 0 | 14 | **17** |
| **Chargers** | 3 | 14 | 0 | 7 | **24** |

at Qualcomm Stadium, San Diego, California

- Date: January 2
- Game time: 3:15 p.m. CST/1:15 p.m. PST
- Game weather: Partly cloudy, 59 °F (15 °C)
- Game attendance: 64,920
- Referee: Bill Leavy
- TV announcers (CBS): Ian Eagle, Solomon Wilcots and Scott Kaplan
- Recap, Game Book

Game information

**First quarter**

- SD – Nate Kaeding 34-yard field goal, 10:56. Chargers 3–0. **Drive: 9 plays, 50 yards, 4:04.**

**Second quarter**

- KC – Lawrence Tynes 50-yard field goal, 7:08. Tied 3–3. **Drive: 10 plays, 39 yards, 5:26.**
- SD – Doug Flutie 1-yard run (Nate Kaeding kick), 2:24. Chargers 10–3. **Drive: 8 plays, 87 yards, 4:44.**
- SD – Ryan Krause 10-yard pass from Doug Flutie (Nate Kaeding kick), 0:12. Chargers 17–3. **Drive: 5 plays, 64 yards, 0:40.**

**Third quarter**

- No scoring plays.

**Fourth quarter**

- SD – Malcom Floyd 13-yard pass from Philip Rivers (Nate Kaeding kick), 7:11. Chargers 24–3. **Drive: 4 plays, 39 yards, 2:11.**
- KC – Larry Johnson 2-yard run (Lawrence Tynes kick), 4:10. Chargers 24–10. **Drive: 8 plays, 78 yards, 3:01.**
- KC – Larry Johnson 14-yard pass from Trent Green (Lawrence Tynes kick), 2:10. Chargers 24–17. **Drive: 8 plays, 61 yards, 2:00.**

**Top passers**

- KC – Trent Green – 33/53, 373 yards, TD, 4 INT
- SD – Doug Flutie – 13/22, 199 yards, TD

**Top rushers**

- KC – Larry Johnson – 17 rushes, 46 yards, TD
- SD – Michael Turner – 15 rushes, 87 yards

**Top receivers**

- KC – Tony Gonzalez – 14 receptions, 144 yards
- SD – Ryan Krause – 5 receptions, 81 yards, TD

=== Standings ===
==== Division ====
AFC West
| | W | L | T | PCT | DIV | CONF | PF | PA | STK |
|---|---|---|---|---|---|---|---|---|---|
| ^{(4)} San Diego Chargers | 12 | 4 | 0 | .750 | 5–1 | 9–3 | 446 | 313 | W1 |
| ^{(6)} Denver Broncos | 10 | 6 | 0 | .625 | 3–3 | 7–5 | 381 | 304 | W2 |
| Kansas City Chiefs | 7 | 9 | 0 | .438 | 3–3 | 6–6 | 483 | 435 | L1 |
| Oakland Raiders | 5 | 11 | 0 | .313 | 1–5 | 3–9 | 320 | 442 | L2 |

==== Conference ====
AFC
| # | Team | Division | W | L | T | PCT | DIV | CONF | SOS | SOV | STK |
|---|---|---|---|---|---|---|---|---|---|---|---|
**Division leaders**
| 1 | Pittsburgh Steelers | North | 15 | 1 | 0 | .938 | 5–1 | 11–1 | .484 | .479 | W14 |
| 2 | New England Patriots | East | 14 | 2 | 0 | .875 | 5–1 | 10–2 | .492 | .478 | W2 |
| 3 (Note: Indianapolis clinched the AFC #3 seed instead of San Diego based upon head-to-head victory.) | Indianapolis Colts | South | 12 | 4 | 0 | .750 | 5–1 | 8–4 | .500 | .458 | L1 |
| 4 | San Diego Chargers | West | 12 | 4 | 0 | .750 | 5–1 | 9–3 | .477 | .411 | W1 |
**Wild cards**
| 5 (Note: New York Jets clinched the AFC #5 seed instead of Denver based upon better record against common opponents (New York Jets were 5–0 to Denver’s 3–2 against San Diego, Cincinnati, Houston, and Miami).) | New York Jets | East | 10 | 6 | 0 | .625 | 3–3 | 7–5 | .523 | .406 | L2 |
| 6 | Denver Broncos | West | 10 | 6 | 0 | .625 | 3–3 | 7–5 | .484 | .450 | W2 |
**Did not qualify for the postseason**
| 7 (Note: Jacksonville and Baltimore finished ahead of Buffalo because they each defeated Buffalo head-to-head.) (Note: Jacksonville finished ahead of Baltimore based upon better record against common opponents (Jacksonville were 3–2 against Baltimore’s 2–3 versus Pittsburgh, Indianapolis, Buffalo and Kansas City).) | Jacksonville Jaguars | South | 9 | 7 | 0 | .563 | 2–4 | 6–6 | .527 | .479 | W1 |
| 8 | Baltimore Ravens | North | 9 | 7 | 0 | .563 | 3–3 | 6–6 | .551 | .472 | W1 |
| 9 | Buffalo Bills | East | 9 | 7 | 0 | .563 | 3–3 | 5–7 | .512 | .382 | L1 |
| 10 | Cincinnati Bengals | North | 8 | 8 | 0 | .500 | 2–4 | 4–8 | .543 | .453 | W2 |
| 11 (Note: Houston finished ahead of Kansas City based upon head-to-head victory.) | Houston Texans | South | 7 | 9 | 0 | .438 | 4–2 | 6–6 | .504 | .402 | L1 |
| 12 | Kansas City Chiefs | West | 7 | 9 | 0 | .438 | 3–3 | 6–6 | .551 | .509 | L1 |
| 13 (Note: Oakland finished ahead of Tennessee based upon head-to-head victory.) | Oakland Raiders | West | 5 | 11 | 0 | .313 | 1–5 | 3–9 | .570 | .450 | L2 |
| 14 | Tennessee Titans | South | 5 | 11 | 0 | .313 | 1–5 | 3–9 | .512 | .463 | W1 |
| 15 (Note: Miami finished ahead of Cleveland based upon head-to-head victory.) | Miami Dolphins | East | 4 | 12 | 0 | .250 | 1–5 | 2–10 | .555 | .438 | L1 |
| 16 | Cleveland Browns | North | 4 | 12 | 0 | .250 | 1–5 | 3–9 | .590 | .469 | W1 |
**Tiebreakers** (Note: When breaking ties for three or more teams under the NFL's rules, they are first broken within divisions, then comparing only the highest-ranked remaining team from each division.)
