= Arbet =

Arbet is a surname. Notable people with the surname include:

- Darren Arbet (born 1962), American football coach
- Gregor Arbet (born 1983), Estonian basketball player and coach
- Kevin Arbet (born 1981), American football player, nephew of Darren

== See also ==
- Arbet Kozhaya, a city in Lebanon
