= Rob Verchick =

American legal scholar (born 1964)

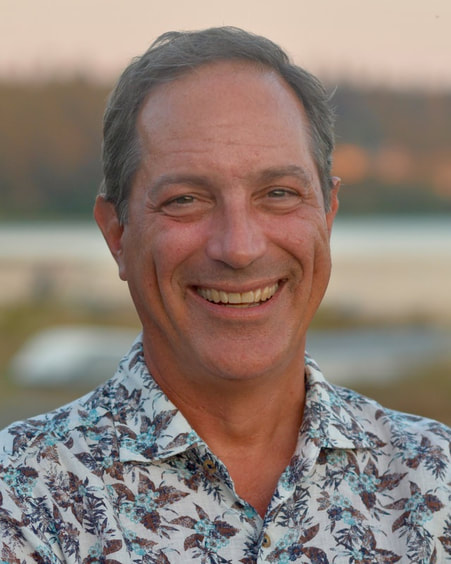
- Born: Robert Reed Verchick; October 5, 1964 (age 61); Las Vegas, Nevada, U.S.
- Education: Stanford University (BA); Harvard Law School (J.D.)
- Occupations: Law professor; writer; regulator
- Website: robverchick.com

Robert Reed Verchick is a U.S. legal scholar known for his studies and advocacy related to environmental law, climate change adaptation, and disaster law, a new field that he has helped organize and develop. He is the Wendall Gauthier-Michael St. Martin Eminent Scholars Chair in Environmental Law at Loyola University New Orleans and also a Senior Fellow at Tulane University. Verchick was the Deputy Associate Administrator for Policy at the U.S. Environmental Protection Agency from 2009 to 2010 in the Obama administration. He is past-president and a current board member of the non-profit policy research organization the Center for Progressive Reform.

== Early life and education ==
Verchick was born on October 5, 1964, in Las Vegas, Nevada. He graduated from Chaparral High School in Las Vegas in 1982. After high school, Verchick attended Stanford University and graduated with a Bachelor of Arts in English, with departmental honors, in 1986. He attended Harvard Law School, where he served as an articles editor at the Harvard Civil Rights–Civil Liberties Law Review. He graduated in 1989 with a Juris Doctor cum laude in 1989.

== Career ==
As a law professor at the University Missouri-Kansas City for 11 years, he wrote influential works on environmental regulation, feminism, and the environmental justice movement. Since 2004, Verchick has held the Wendall Gauthier-Michael St. Martin Eminent Scholars Chair in Environmental Law at Loyola University New Orleans. After personally experiencing the devastation of New Orleans following Hurricane Katrina, Verchick's research and advocacy expanded to include climate resilience, climate justice, and disaster policy. His co-authored book, Disaster Law and Policy, published in 2010, was the first legal text book to introduce the subject of disaster law and policy to university students.

In 2012, Verchick was a Fulbright Scholar, based in New Delhi, India.

As Deputy Associate Administrator for Policy at the U.S. Environmental Protection Agency in 2009 and 2010, Verchick served on President Obama's Interagency Climate Change Adaptation Task Force.

In 2015, was appointed President of The Center for Progressive Reform, a nonprofit research and advocacy organization.

In 2017, Verchick was named Professor of the Year.

In 2021, Louisiana State Governor John Bel Edwards appointed Verchick to the state’s new Climate Emissions Task Force, the first of its kind in the Gulf South.

== Writing ==
In 2023, Verchick released his fifth book, The Octopus In The Parking Garage: A Call For Climate Resilience. Published by Columbia University Press, the book empowers readers to face the climate crisis and provides examples of what society can do to adapt and thrive. The title of the book is a reference to an op-ed that Verchick wrote for the Miami Herald in 2016, About that octopus in the parking garage.

== Books ==
- Verchick, Robert R. M. (2010). Facing catastrophe : environmental action for a post-Katrina world. Cambridge, Mass.: Harvard University Press. ISBN 978-0-674-05694-7. OCLC 671648442
- Farber, Daniel A. (2015). Disaster law and policy. Jim Chen, Robert R. M. Verchick, Lisa Grow Sun (Third ed.). New York. ISBN 978-1-4548-6925-2. OCLC 921253487
- Levit, Nancy (2016). Feminist legal theory : a primer. Robert R. M. Verchick (Second ed.). New York. ISBN 978-1-4798-0549-5. OCLC 929452292
- Lyster, Rosemary; Verchick, Robert R. M., eds. (2018). Research handbook on climate disaster law : barriers and opportunities. Cheltenham, UK. ISBN 978-1-78643-003-8. OCLC 1040072398
- Verchick, Robert R. M. (2023). The Octopus In The Parking Garage: A Call For Climate Resilience. S.l.: Columbia University Press. ISBN 0-231-20354-3. OCLC 1344422905.
