= Bobby Wade =

American football player (born 1981)

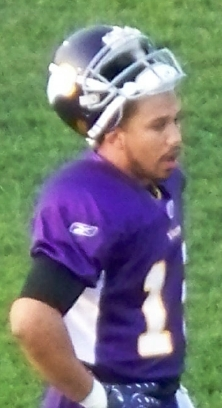
- Wade with the Minnesota Vikings in 2008

Arizona Wildcats
- Title: Assistant head coach/Wide receivers coach/Pass game coordinator

Personal information
- Born: February 26, 1981 (age 45); Los Angeles, California, U.S.
- Listed height: 5 ft 10 in (1.78 m)
- Listed weight: 186 lb (84 kg)

Career information
- Position: Wide receiver (No. 84, 19, 80)
- High school: Desert Vista (Phoenix, Arizona)
- College: Arizona (1999–2002)
- NFL draft: 2003: 5th round, 139th overall pick

Career history

Playing
- Chicago Bears (2003–2005); Tennessee Titans (2005–2006); Minnesota Vikings (2007–2008); Kansas City Chiefs (2009); Washington Redskins (2010)*
- * Offseason or practice squad member only

Coaching
- Arizona State (2022–2023) Offensive analyst; Arizona (2024–present) Wide receivers coach

Awards and highlights
- 2× First-team All-Pac-10 (2000, 2002)

Career NFL statistics
- Receptions: 244
- Receiving yards: 2,858
- Receiving touchdowns: 9
- Return yards: 1,854
- Return touchdowns: 1
- Stats at Pro Football Reference

Robert Louis Wade Jr. (born February 26, 1981) is an American former professional football wide receiver who is the current wide receivers coach for the Arizona Wildcats. Wade played college for the Arizona Wildcats as a wide receiver from 1999 to 2002. Wade also played for the Chicago Bears, Tennessee Titans, Minnesota Vikings, and Kansas City Chiefs in the NFL.

== Early life ==
Wade attended Desert Vista High School in Phoenix, Arizona and was an all star Athlete student letterwinner in football, track & field, soccer and basketball. As a senior, he was the USA Today High School Football Player of the Year for Offense and Defense and he helped lead his team to the Class 5A State Championship. In track & field, he won the Class 5A triple jump title as a senior.

He received a 25th Anniversary award for a Friday Night Fever Offensive MVP (Terrell Suggs Defensive MVP) award from AZ local Channel 12.

== College career ==
Wade played four seasons for the University of Arizona Wildcats as a wide receiver from 1999 to 2002. In 45 games, he caught 230 passes for 3,351 yards and 23 touchdowns. He was inducted into the Wildcat Ring of Honor in 2015. He currently holds the record for the most single-season receptions with 93. He also was the all-time leader in career receiving yards until Tetairoa McMillan passed him in 2024. Wade is still one of the most accomplished receivers Arizona has had.

== Professional career ==
Pre-draft measurables
Height	Weight	Arm length	Hand span	40-yard dash	10-yard split	20-yard split	20-yard shuttle	Three-cone drill	Vertical jump	Broad jump
5 ft 10 1/4 in (1.78 m)	193 lb (88 kg)	31 1/2 in (0.80 m)	9 3/4 in (0.25 m)	4.66 s	1.59 s	2.72 s	4.11 s	7.01 s	34.5 in (0.88 m)	9 ft 7 in (2.92 m)
All values from NFL Combine

=== Chicago Bears ===
The Chicago Bears selected Wade in the fifth round of the 2003 NFL draft. His best season with the team came in 2004 when he caught forty-two passes for 481 yards. In 2005, Wade saw more playing time as a punt returner and scored the first special teams touchdown of his career during the second week of the 2005 season. He was released by the Bears late in the 2005 season.

=== Tennessee Titans ===
While leading the NFC in punt return average and yards Wade was released in week 13. After his release, Wade was signed by the Tennessee Titans and appeared in two games in 2005. He remained with Titans in 2006 where he became a major offensive and special teams weapon in his 18-game Titan career. Wade was a very productive slot receiver with 50 receptions for 701 yards and 5 touchdowns.

=== Minnesota Vikings ===
On March 6, 2007, Wade signed a free agent contract worth $16 million with the Minnesota Vikings and had the best season of his career. Wade put up career high numbers in receptions (64), yards (747) and touchdowns (5).

In 2008. Wade finished with 58 catches for 645 yards and 5 touchdowns. Also, Wade's team made the playoffs for the first time in his career with Wade as a captain. Wades first two years he led his team in receptions and punt return yards.

Wade was released by the Vikings three days before the Vikings first game of the 2009 season very unexpectedly. This happened just one week after agreeing to rework his contract and take a pay cut from $3 million to $1.5 million for this season. Wade also would have then become a free agent at the end of this season. Allowing him to test the free agent market after his best 3 years.

=== Kansas City Chiefs ===
Wade signed with the Kansas City Chiefs on September 14, 2009. Wade made himself at home quickly in Kansas City after missing the first 2 games Wade played week 3 in Kansas City and led his team in Receptions. Wade finished second on the team in receptions that year next to Dwayne Bowe.

=== Washington Redskins ===
Wade signed with the Washington Redskins on April 29, 2010.

== Coaching career ==
=== Arizona State ===
Wade was an offensive analyst for Arizona State from 2022 to 2023.

=== Arizona ===
He became the wide receivers coach at Arizona in 2024.
