= Milton Wynn =

American football player (born 1978)

No. 88, 85
- Position: Wide receiver

Personal information
- Born: September 21, 1978 (age 48); Mission Hills, California, U.S.
- Listed height: 6 ft 2 in (1.88 m)
- Listed weight: 207 lb (94 kg)

Career information
- High school: Antelope Valley (Lancaster, California)
- College: Washington State (1999–2000)
- NFL draft: 2001: 4th round, 116th overall pick

Career history
- St. Louis Rams (2001)*; Tampa Bay Buccaneers (2001); Houston Texans (2002)*; Atlanta Falcons (2002)*; Baltimore Ravens (2002–2003)
- * Offseason or practice squad member only

Awards and highlights
- Second-team All-Pac-10 (2000)

Career NFL statistics
- Receptions: 4
- Receiving yards: 69
- Stats at Pro Football Reference

Milton Thomas Wynn (born September 21, 1978) is an American former professional football player who was a wide receiver in the National Football League (NFL). He was selected by the St. Louis Rams in the fourth round of the 2001 NFL draft. He played college football for the Washington State Cougars.

Wynn was also a member of the Tampa Bay Buccaneers, Houston Texans, Atlanta Falcons and Baltimore Ravens.

== Professional career ==
=== Pre-draft ===
Pre-draft measurables
| Height | Weight | 40-yard dash | 10-yard split | 20-yard split | Vertical jump |
|---|---|---|---|---|---|
| 6 ft 2 3/8 in (1.89 m) | 207 lb (94 kg) | 4.46 s | 1.55 s | 2.63 s | 33 1/2 in (0.85 m) |
All from WSU pro day.

=== St. Louis Rams ===
Wynn was selected in the fourth round (116th overall) by the St. Louis Rams in the 2001 NFL draft. He signed with the Rams on July 19 and was waived on September 2.

=== Tampa Bay Buccaneers ===
On September 4, 2001, Wynn was claimed by the Tampa Bay Buccaneers. In one game with Tampa Bay, he had four catches and 69 yards. He was released on August 27, 2002.

After trying out with the San Francisco 49ers, Wynn signed with the Houston Texans on October 16, and was sent to their practice squad. He was waived on November 6.

Wynn was signed to the Atlanta Falcons practice squad on November 13, 2002. The Baltimore Ravens signed Wynn from the Falcons' practice squad on November 26. Over two seasons in Baltimore he played in three games. He was waived on August 25, 2003.
