= 2001 All-Pacific-10 Conference football team =

The 2001 All-Pacific-10 Conference football team consists of American football players chosen for All-Pacific-10 Conference teams for the 2001 Pacific-10 Conference football season.

== Offensive selections ==
=== Quarterbacks ===
- Joey Harrington, Oregon (Coaches-1)
- Jason Gesser, Washington St. (Coaches-2)

=== Running backs ===
- DeShaun Foster, UCLA (Coaches-1)
- Clarence Farmer, Arizona (Coaches-1)
- Maurice Morris, Oregon (Coaches-2)
- Onterrio Smith, Oregon (Coaches-2)

=== Wide receivers ===
- Shaun McDonald, Arizona St. (Coaches-1)
- Keenan Howry, Oregon (Coaches-1)
- Nakoa McElrath, Washington St. (Coaches-2)
- Reggie Williams, Washington (Coaches-2)

=== Tight ends ===
- Justin Peelle, Oregon (Coaches-1)
- Bryan Fletcher, UCLA (Coaches-2)

=== Offensive linemen ===
- Eric Heitmann, Stanford (Coaches-1)
- Levi Jones, Arizona St. (Coaches-1)
- Scott Peters, Arizona St. (Coaches-1)
- Derrick Roche, Washington St. (Coaches-1)
- Kyle Benn, Washington (Coaches-1)
- Kwame Harris, Stanford (Coaches-2)
- Mike Saffer, UCLA (Coaches-2)
- Zack Quaccia, Stanford (Coaches-2)
- Chris Gibson, Oregon St. (Coaches-2)
- Greg Schindler, Stanford (Coaches-2)

== Defensive selections ==
=== Defensive ends ===
- Terrell Suggs, Arizona St. (Coaches-1)
- Kenyon Coleman, UCLA (Coaches-1)
- Lonnie Ford, USC (Coaches-2)
- Marcus Hoover, Stanford (Coaches-2)

=== Defensive tackles ===
- Larry Tripplett, Washington (Coaches-1)
- Eric Manning, Oregon St. (Coaches-1)
- Rodney Leisle, UCLA (Coaches-2)
- Rien Long, Washington St. (Coaches-2)

=== Linebackers ===
- Robert Thomas, UCLA (Coaches-1)
- Coy Wire, Stanford (Coaches-1)
- Lance Briggs, Arizona (Coaches-1)
- Richard Seigler, Oregon St. (Coaches-2)
- Raonall Smith, Washington St. (Coaches-2)
- Wesly Mallard, Oregon (Coaches-2)

=== Defensive backs ===
- Troy Polamalu, USC (Coaches-1)
- Tank Williams, Stanford (Coaches-1)
- Ricky Manning, UCLA (Coaches-1)
- Lamont Thompson, Washington St. (Coaches-1)
- Dennis Weathersby, Oregon St. (Coaches-2)
- Rashad Bauman, Oregon (Coaches-2
- Marques Anderson, UCLA (Coaches-2)
- Chris Cash, USC (Coaches-2)

== Special teams ==
=== Placekickers ===
- Drew Dunning, Washington St. (Coaches-1)
- John Anderson, Washington (Coaches-2)

=== Punters ===
- Nate Fikse, UCLA (Coaches-1)
- Nick Murphy, Arizona St. (Coaches-2)

=== Return specialists/All purpose ===
- Brian Allen, Stanford (Coaches-1)
- Keenan Howry, Oregon (Coaches-1)
- Kevin Arbet, USC (Coaches-1)
- Onterrio Smith, Oregon (Coaches-2)
- Luke Powell, Stanford (Coaches-2)
- Wesly Mallard, Oregon (Coaches-2)

== See also ==
- 2001 College Football All-America Team
