= Lance Briggs =

American football player (born 1980)

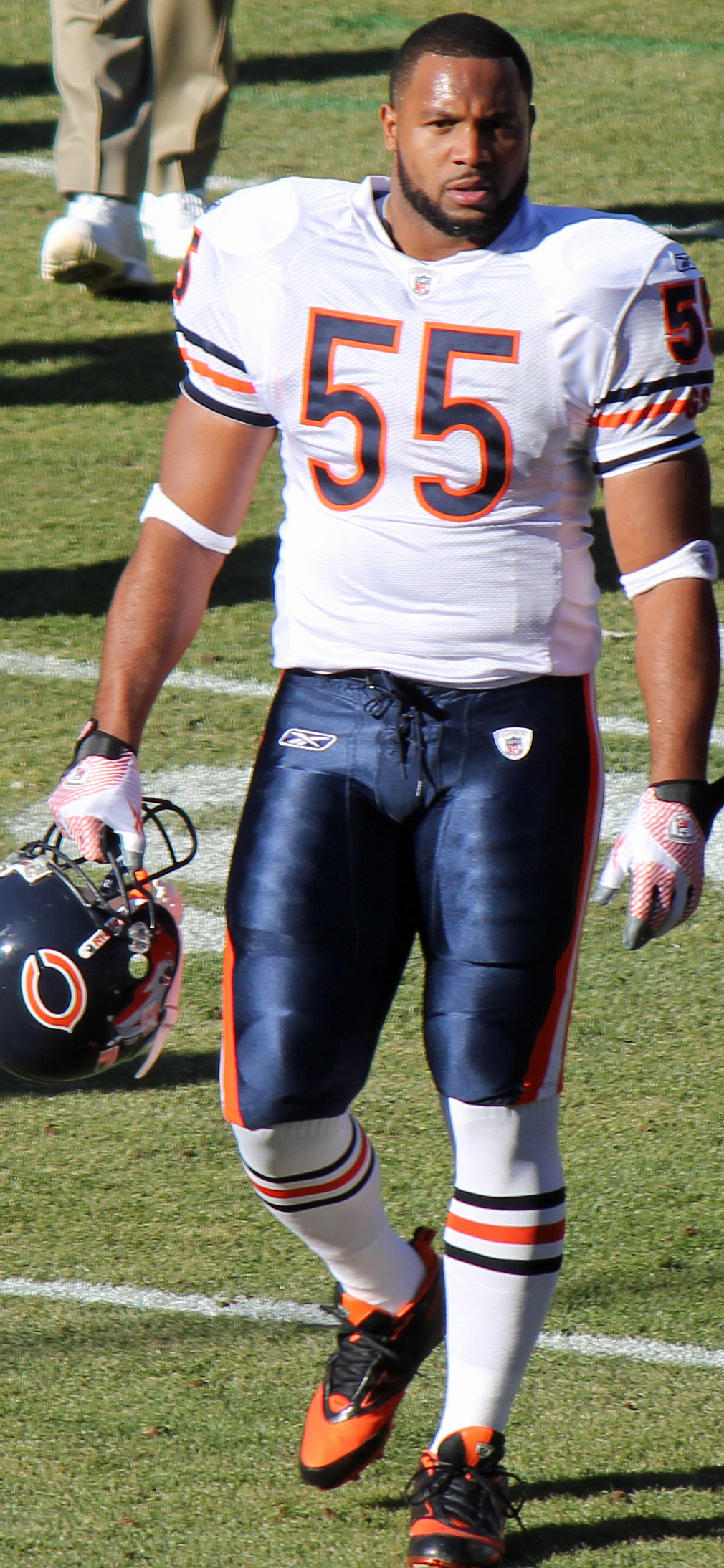
- Briggs with the Chicago Bears in 2011

No. 55
- Position: Linebacker

Personal information
- Born: November 12, 1980 (age 46); Los Angeles, California, U.S.
- Listed height: 6 ft 1 in (1.85 m)
- Listed weight: 244 lb (111 kg)

Career information
- High school: Elk Grove (Elk Grove, California)
- College: Arizona (1999–2002)
- NFL draft: 2003: 3rd round, 68th overall pick

Career history
- Chicago Bears (2003–2014)

Awards and highlights
- 2× First-team All-Pro (2005, 2006); Second-team All-Pro (2009); 7× Pro Bowl (2005–2011); 100 greatest Bears of All-Time; 3× First-team All-Pac-10 (2000, 2001, 2002)

Career NFL statistics
- Total tackles: 1,181
- Sacks: 15.0
- Forced fumbles: 16
- Fumble recoveries: 7
- Interceptions: 16
- Defensive touchdowns: 6
- Stats at Pro Football Reference

Lance Marell Briggs (born November 12, 1980) is an American former professional football player who was a linebacker for the Chicago Bears of the National Football League (NFL). He played college football for the Arizona Wildcats and was selected by the Bears in the third round of the 2003 NFL draft, where he played his entire 12-year career. He was a seven-time Pro Bowl selection. Briggs played alongside Pro Football Hall of Fame linebacker Brian Urlacher during his tenure with the Bears. The two would be regarded as one of the greatest linebacker tandems in NFL history.

== Early life ==
A Sacramento, California native, Briggs attended Elk Grove High School in Elk Grove, California. While at the University of Arizona, he was a three-time first-team All-Pac-10 Conference selection as a linebacker for the Wildcats. Briggs finished his college career with 308 tackles, 10.5 sacks, 36 tackles for losses, three interceptions, 10 passes deflected, five forced fumbles and four fumble recoveries in 33 games at strong side linebacker.

== Professional career ==
Pre-draft measurables
Height	Weight	Arm length	Hand span	40-yard dash	10-yard split	20-yard split	Vertical jump	Broad jump	Bench press
6 ft 0 5/8 in (1.84 m)	242 lb (110 kg)	31 in (0.79 m)	9 1/2 in (0.24 m)	4.75 s	1.66 s	2.76 s	33.0 in (0.84 m)	9 ft 5 in (2.87 m)	25 reps
All values from NFL Combine

The Chicago Bears selected Briggs in the third round (68th overall) of the 2003 NFL draft. Briggs was the 13th linebacker drafted in 2003.

On July 25, 2003, the Bears signed Briggs to a four-year, $2.06 million contract that includes a signing bonus of $690,000. Throughout training camp, Briggs competed to be a starting outside linebacker against veteran Bryan Knight. Head coach Dick Jauron named Briggs a backup outside linebacker to start his rookie season, behind Bryan Knight and Warrick Holdman.

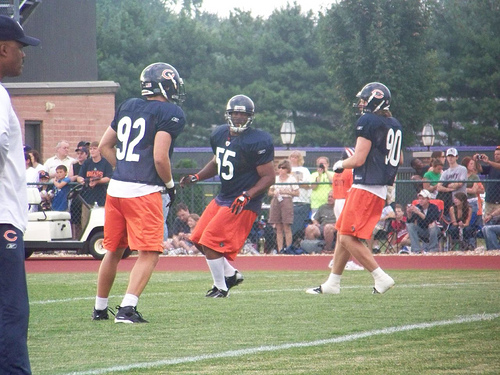
Briggs (55) at the Bears summer training camp in 2008

He made his professional regular season debut during the Chicago Bears' season-opener at the San Francisco 49ers and made one solo tackle as they lost 49–7. On October 5, 2003, Briggs earned his first career start and recorded one solo tackle during a 24–21 win against the Oakland Raiders in Week 4. In Week 9, Briggs collected a season-high 11 combined tackles (seven solo) during a 12–10 loss at the Detroit Lions. On December 7, 2003, Briggs recorded nine combined tackles (seven solo), deflected two passes, and intercepted a pass which he returned for the first touchdown of his career during a 34–21 loss at the Green Bay Packers in Week 13. Briggs made his first career interception off a pass by Packers' quarterback Brett Favre and returned it for a 45-yard touchdown during the first quarter. He finished his rookie season in 2003 with 78 combined tackles (65 solo), four passes defended, one interception, and one touchdown in 16 games and 13 starts.

In 2004, he made 126 tackles and was elected as a second alternate to the Pro Bowl.

In 2005, Briggs was selected to represent the National Football Conference in the 2006 Pro Bowl.

Briggs engaged the Bears for a contract extension prior to the 2006 NFL season. After the two sides reached an impasse, Briggs refused to attend the team's voluntary workouts and missed part of training camp. He was subsequently demoted in favor of Leon Joe but earned back his starting position. During the season, Briggs was a major contributor to the Bears' defense that reached Super Bowl XLI. He recorded two interceptions, four forced fumbles, two interceptions, one sack, and a career high 134 total tackles. Briggs was selected to play in the 2007 Pro Bowl, but declined the invitation because of an injured foot.

Briggs and the Bears failed to reach a long-term contract extension as the 2007 season approached. The Bears instead placed a franchise tag on Briggs, which guaranteed him $7.206 million for the next season. Briggs was dissatisfied with the move, commenting, "I am now prepared to sit out the year if the Bears don't trade me or release me, I've played my last snap for them. I'll never play another down for Chicago again." The Washington Redskins inquired about acquiring Briggs and Chicago's 31st overall pick in the 2007 NFL draft for Washington's 6th overall pick. The trade talks faltered and Bears refused to release Briggs. He skipped the team's voluntary and mandatory spring training camp sessions out of protest. Despite his comments, Briggs played for the Bears during the 2007 season, where he accrued 140 total tackles and earned his third Pro Bowl selection.

The Bears re-signed Briggs to a six-year, $36 million contract on March 1, 2008. He was ranked 92nd by his fellow players on the NFL Top 100 Players of 2011.

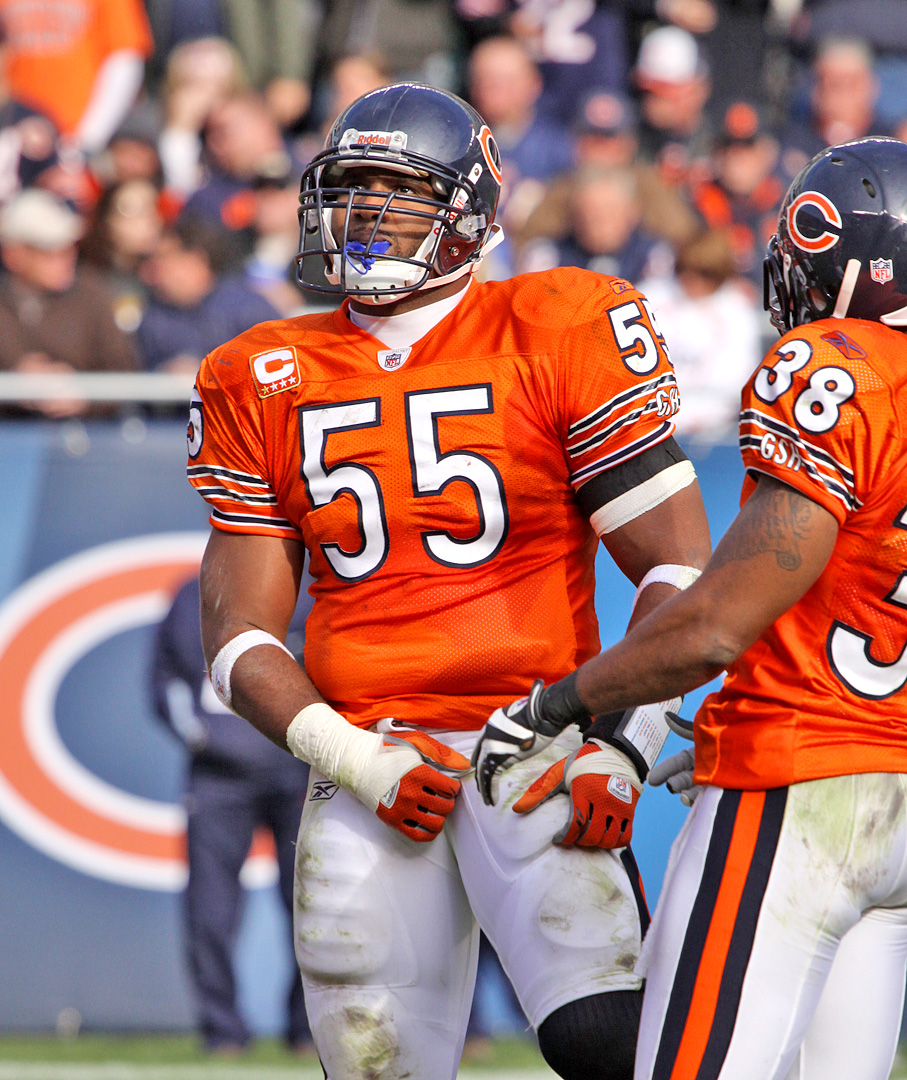
Briggs in November 2009

On September 2, 2011, Briggs and his agent, Drew Rosenhaus, formally asked the Bears organization for a trade, with three years left on his six-year contract. The request came after Briggs asked the Bears for a raise.

Briggs made the 2012 Pro Bowl team, but was unable to play due to an ankle injury.

On April 11, 2012, Briggs was given a one-year extension, extended his contract through 2014. In week 7 of 2013 against the Washington Redskins, Briggs suffered a fracture in his shoulder. He rejoined the Bears in week 16, a 54–11 loss to the Philadelphia Eagles.

Briggs recorded 24 tackles and one interception during the 2014 NFL season. After starting the season as the Bears' weak-side linebacker, Briggs was injured during week 5 and missed three games. He commented that his future with the team was in jeopardy, as he was in the final year of his contract. Briggs returned to play four more games, but injured his groin muscle during a week 13 game against the Detroit Lions. The Bears subsequently placed Briggs on their injury reserve list.

Briggs became a free agent but remained unsigned through the offseason. He announced his retirement on September 2, 2015.

=== NFL statistics ===
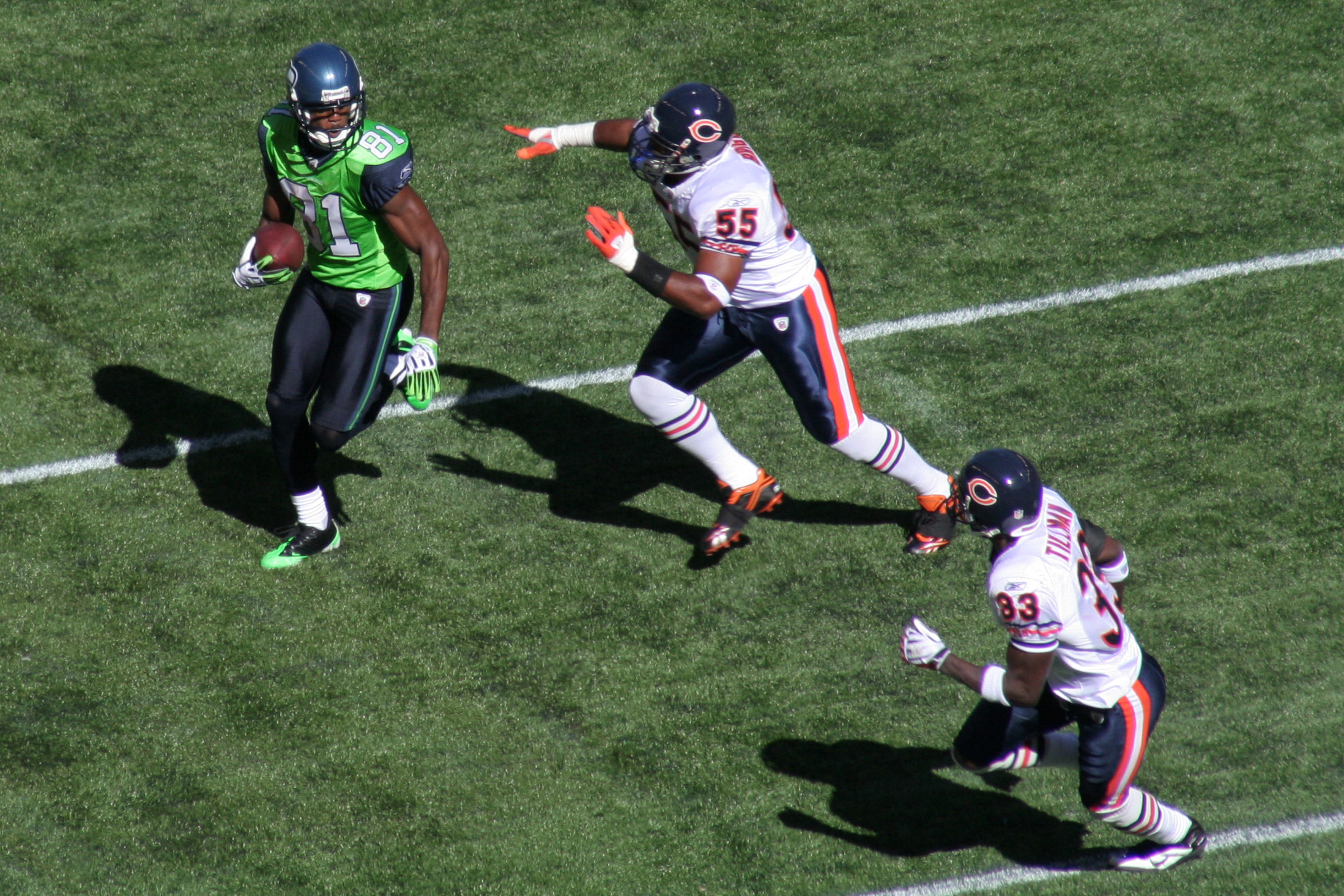
Briggs (upper right) and Charles Tillman pursue Seattle Seahawks receiver Nate Burleson in a game in 2009

Year	Team	GP	COMB	TOTAL	AST	SACK	FF	FR	FR YDS	INT	IR YDS	AVG IR	LNG	TD	PD
2003	CHI	16	78	65	13	0.0	0	0	0	1	45	45	45	1	4
2004	CHI	16	126	102	24	0.5	0	0	0	1	38	38	38	1	10
2005	CHI	16	107	83	24	2.0	3	2	0	2	30	15	20	1	11
2006	CHI	16	134	113	21	1.0	4	1	0	2	18	9	18	0	9
2007	CHI	14	102	83	19	2.0	2	1	0	0	0	0	0	0	3
2008	CHI	16	110	90	20	0.5	1	2	21	3	12	4	9	0	11
2009	CHI	15	118	93	25	2.5	0	0	0	1	0	0	0	0	5
2010	CHI	15	89	76	13	2.0	2	1	0	2	1	1	1	0	7
2011	CHI	16	105	86	19	0.0	2	0	0	1	0	0	0	0	4
2012	CHI	16	103	74	29	1.5	2	0	0	2	110	55	74	2	11
2013	CHI	9	71	51	20	3.0	2	0	0	0	0	0	0	0	8
2014	CHI	8	35	24	11	0	1	0	0	1	2	0	0	0	3
Career		173	1,174	936	238	15.0	16	7	32	16	256	17	74	5	86

== Personal life ==
In August 2007, Briggs crashed his new Lamborghini Murcielago into a light pole. He then left the scene of the accident and reported his car stolen. He was charged with leaving the scene of an accident. He was also cited for failure to give immediate notice of an accident and improper lane usage.

Briggs currently serves as a Bears analyst for NBC Sports Chicago's Football Aftershow, working alongside host Ruthie Polinsky and former teammate Alex Brown, and former Bears head coach Dave Wannstedt.

Briggs is a lifelong comic book reader and fan. In 2020, alongside Kyle Higgins and Danilo Beyruth, he co-created The Trap, a science fiction original graphic novel, on Kickstarter, which was set to be published in 2021.
