= 2002 All-Pacific-10 Conference football team =

The 2002 All-Pacific-10 Conference football team consists of American football players chosen for All-Pacific-10 Conference teams for the 2002 Pacific-10 Conference football season.

== Offensive selections ==
=== Quarterbacks ===
- Jason Gesser, Washington St. (Coaches-1)
- Carson Palmer, USC (Coaches-1)
- Cody Pickett, Washington (Coaches-2)
- Kyle Boller, California (Coaches-2)

=== Running backs ===
- Onterrio Smith, Oregon (Coaches-1)
- Steven Jackson, Oregon St. (Coaches-1)
- Justin Fargas, USC (Coaches-2)
- Tyler Ebell, UCLA (Coaches-2)

=== Wide receivers ===
- Shaun McDonald, Arizona St. (Coaches-1)
- Bobby Wade, Arizona (Coaches-1)
- Reggie Williams, Washington (Coaches-1)
- Mike Williams, USC (Coaches-2)
- Keary Colbert, USC (Coaches-2)

=== Tight ends ===
- Mike Seidman, UCLA (Coaches-1)
- George Wrighster, Oregon (Coaches-2)

=== Offensive linemen ===
- Kwame Harris, Stanford (Coaches-1)
- Mike Saffer, UCLA (Coaches-1)
- Derrick Roche, Washington St. (Coaches-1)
- Jacob Rogers, USC (Coaches-1)
- Calvin Armstrong, Washington St. (Coaches-1)
- Dan Weaver, Oregon (Coaches-2)
- Makoa Freitas, Arizona (Coaches-2)
- Zach Wilson, USC (Coaches-2)
- Eyoseph Efseaff, UCLA (Coaches-2)
- Bryce Bohlander, UCLA (Coaches-2)
- Scott Tercero, California (Coaches-2)

== Defensive selections ==
=== Defensive linemen ===
- Terrell Suggs, Arizona St. (Coaches-1)
- Eric Manning, Oregon St. (Coaches-1)
- Tully Banta-Cain, California (Coaches-1)
- Rien Long, Washington St. (Coaches-1)
- Kenechi Udeze, USC (Coaches-2)
- Kai Ellis, Washington (Coaches-2)
- Dave Ball, UCLA (Coaches-2)
- Mike Patterson, USC (Coaches-2)

=== Linebackers ===
- Richard Seigler, Oregon St. (Coaches-1)
- Nick Barnett, Oregon St. (Coaches-1)
- Lance Briggs, Arizona (Coaches-1)
- Matt Grootegoed, USC (Coaches-1)
- Kevin Mitchell, Oregon (Coaches-2)
- David Moretti, Oregon (Coaches-2)
- Marcus Reese, UCLA (Coaches-2)

=== Defensive backs ===
- Troy Polamalu, USC (Coaches-1)
- Marcus Trufant, Washington St. (Coaches-1)
- Ricky Manning, UCLA (Coaches-1)
- Dennis Weathersby, Oregon St. (Coaches-1)
- Keith Lewis, Oregon (Coaches-2)
- Jemeel Powell, California (Coaches-2)
- Terrell Roberts, Oregon St. (Coaches-2)
- DeShaun Hill, USC (Coaches-2)
- Derrick Johnson, Washington (Coaches-2)

== Special teams ==
=== Placekickers ===
- Jared Siegel, Oregon (Coaches-1)
- John Anderson, Washington (Coaches-2)

=== Punters ===
- Nate Fikse, UCLA (Coaches-1)
- Tim Parker, Arizona St. (Coaches-2)

=== Return specialists/All purpose ===
- LaShaun Ward, California (Coaches-1)
- Keenan Howry, Oregon (Coaches-1)
- Ray Wells, Arizona (Coaches-1)
- Allan Amundson, Oregon (Coaches-2)
- Bobby Wade, Arizona (Coaches-2)
- Mike McGrath, California (Coaches-2)

== Key ==
Coaches = selected by the conference coaches

== See also ==
- 2002 College Football All-America Team
