= 2000 All-Pacific-10 Conference football team =

The 2000 All-Pacific-10 Conference football team consists of American football players chosen for All-Pacific-10 Conference teams for the 2000 Pacific-10 Conference football season.

== Offensive selections ==
=== Quarterbacks ===
- Marques Tuiasosopo, Washington (Coaches-1)
- Joey Harrington, Oregon (Coaches-2)

=== Running backs ===
- Ken Simonton, Oregon St. (Coaches-1)
- DeShaun Foster, UCLA (Coaches-1)
- Maurice Morris, Oregon (Coaches-2)
- Sultan McCullough, USC (Coaches-2)

=== Wide receivers ===
- DeRonnie Pitts, Stanford (Coaches-1)
- Freddie Mitchell, UCLA (Coaches-1)
- Milton Wynn, Washington St. (Coaches-2)
- T. J. Houshmandzadeh, Oregon St. (Coaches-2)

=== Tight ends ===
- Todd Heap, Arizona St. (Coaches-1)
- Jerramy Stevens, Washington (Coaches-2)

=== Offensive linemen ===
- Chris Gibson, Oregon St. (Coaches-1)
- Victor Leyva, Arizona St. (Coaches-1)
- Scott Peters, Arizona St. (Coaches-1)
- Elliot Silvers, Washington (Coaches-1)
- Chad Ward, Washington (Coaches-1)
- Lee Gundy, Oregon (Coaches-2)
- Eric Heitmann, Stanford (Coaches-2)
- Mitch White, Oregon St. (Coaches-2)
- Marques McFadden, Arizona (Coaches-2)
- Levi Jones, Arizona St. (Coaches-2)
- Brandon Ludwig, California (Coaches-2)

== Defensive selections ==
=== Defensive ends ===
- Andre Carter, California (Coaches-1)
- DeLawrence Grant, Oregon St. (Coaches-1)
- Saul Patu, Oregon (Coaches-2)
- Joe Tafoya, Arizona (Coaches-2)

=== Defensive tackles ===
- Willie Howard, Stanford (Coaches-1)
- Larry Tripplett, Washington (Coaches-1)
- Jacob Waasdorp, California (Coaches-2)
- Ennis Davis, USC (Coaches-2)

=== Linebackers ===
- Adam Archuleta, Arizona St. (Coaches-1)
- Lance Briggs, Arizona (Coaches-1)
- Riall Johnson, Stanford (Coaches-1)
- Zeke Moreno, USC (Coaches-2)
- Darnell Robinson, Oregon St. (Coaches-2)
- Robert Thomas, UCLA (Coaches-2)

=== Defensive backs ===
- Dennis Weathersby, Oregon St. (Coaches-1)
- Rashad Bauman, Oregon (Coaches-1)
- Ricky Manning, UCLA (Coaches-1)
- Hakim Akbar, Washington (Coaches-1)
- Curtis Williams, Washington (Coaches-2)
- Tank Williams, Stanford (Coaches-2)
- Michael Jolivette, Arizona (Coaches-2)
- Terrance Carroll, Oregon St. (Coaches-2)
- Billy Newman, Washington St. (Coaches-2)

== Special teams ==
=== Placekickers ===
- Ryan Cesca, Oregon St. (Coaches-1)
- Chris Griffith, UCLA (Coaches-2)

=== Punters ===
- Nick Harris, California (Coaches-1)
- Nate Fikse, UCLA (Coaches-2)

=== Return specialists/All purpose ===
- Bobby Wade, Arizona (Coaches-1)
- Jermaine Hanspard, Oregon (Coaches-1)
- Jemeel Powell, California (Coaches-2)
- Peter Hansen, Arizona (Coaches-2)

== Key ==
Coaches = selected by the conference coaches

== See also ==
- 2000 College Football All-America Team
