= Jemeel Powell =

American football player (born 1980)

No. 25
- Position: Cornerback

Personal information
- Born: August 29, 1980 (age 46); Los Angeles, California, U.S.
- Listed height: 6 ft 0 in (1.83 m)
- Listed weight: 185 lb (84 kg)

Career information
- High school: Junípero Serra (CA)
- College: California
- NFL draft: 2003: undrafted

Career history
- Detroit Lions (2003)*; Dallas Cowboys (2003)
- * Offseason or practice squad member only

Awards and highlights
- 2× Second-team All-Pac-10 (2000, 2002)

Career NFL statistics
- Games played: 3
- Stats at Pro Football Reference

Jemeel Powell (born August 29, 1980) is an American former professional football player who was a cornerback for the Dallas Cowboys of the National Football League (NFL). He played college football for the California Golden Bears.

== Early life ==
Powell attended Junípero Serra High School, where he was a two-way player at wide receiver and cornerback. As a senior, he had 59 tackles, 6 interceptions and 4 returned kicks (two kickoffs and two punts) for touchdowns. He also practiced track.

He accepted a football scholarship from the University of California, Berkeley. As a redshirt freshman, he missed four games for the Golden Bears with a strained groin. He returned to action in the sixth game against UCLA as a wide receiver. He finished the season with 2 receptions for 42 yards and 3 tackles.

As a sophomore, he helped preserve a 46–38 triple-overtime win against UCLA with an interception in the end zone. He also played a key role in defeating USC, by returning 4 punt returns for 138 yards and making an interception with 4:41 minutes left in the game. He posted 34 tackles, 16 pass deflections (school record), 4 interceptions (led the team), 12 punt returns for 218 yards, a school record 18.2-yard average and one touchdown. He received second-team All-Pac-10 honors as a return specialist and honorable-mention as a cornerback.

As a junior, he was limited with hamstring and groin injuries that forced him to miss all of spring practice and 4 regular-season games. He tallied 15 tackles, one interception, 3 pass deflections and 13 punt returns for 117 yards (9-yard avg.).

As a senior, he registered 42 tackles, 5 interceptions (tied for the conference lead), 13 pass deflections and 32 punt returns for 389 yards (12.2-yard avg.).

== Professional career ==
=== Detroit Lions ===
Powell was signed as an undrafted free agent by the Detroit Lions after the 2003 NFL draft on April 29. He was waived on August 31.

=== Dallas Cowboys ===
On September 1, 2003, he was claimed off waivers by the Dallas Cowboys. He was declared inactive for the season opener against the Atlanta Falcons. He made his professional debut the following game against the New York Giants, playing on special teams. He was declared inactive for the final 12 games of the regular season, returning in the wild card playoff game against the Carolina Panthers.

In 2004, he competed for the starting cornerback job vacated by Mario Edwards. On September 11, he was released after the team opted to keep 3 rookie cornerbacks.
