= Dennis Weathersby =

American football player (born 1980)

No. 23
- Position: Cornerback

Personal information
- Born: June 16, 1980 (age 46); Glendora, California, U.S.
- Listed height: 6 ft 1 in (1.85 m)
- Listed weight: 204 lb (93 kg)

Career information
- High school: Duarte (Duarte, California)
- College: Oregon State
- NFL draft: 2003: 4th round, 98th overall pick

Career history
- Cincinnati Bengals (2003–2004)

Awards and highlights
- 2× First-team All-Pac-10 (2000, 2002); 2× Second-team All-Pac-10 (1999, 2001)
- Stats at Pro Football Reference

Dennis Weathersby (born June 16, 1980) is an American former professional football cornerback for the Cincinnati Bengals of the National Football League (NFL).

== College career ==
Weathersby played in college for Oregon State University. At OSU he started 45 games, and set a school record of 57 passes deflected. He was named to the Pac-10 All-Academic team for 4 consecutive years.

== Professional career ==
Pre-draft measurables
Height	Weight	Arm length	Hand span	40-yard dash	10-yard split	20-yard split	20-yard shuttle	Three-cone drill	Vertical jump	Broad jump	Bench press
6 ft 1 in (1.85 m)	204 lb (93 kg)	32 in (0.81 m)	9 1/4 in (0.23 m)	4.40 s	1.52 s	2.57 s	4.13 s	7.14 s	38 in (0.97 m)	10 ft 5 in (3.18 m)	9 reps
All values from NFL Combine.

Weathersby was projected to be drafted in the first or second round of the 2003 NFL draft. On April 20, 2003, only three days before the NFL draft, he was shot in the back in an apparent gang-related shooting when he and his friend were mistaken for gang members by the Du Roc Crips. Despite the incident, the Bengals still drafted him in the fourth round with the 98th overall pick joining his former Oregon State teammates Chad Johnson and T. J. Houshmandzadeh who were also drafted. He survived and recovered from the shooting, but his injuries took longer than expected to heal and he only played in four games his rookie season.

On April 12, 2004, he was involved in a car accident that put him into a coma. He eventually came out of the coma and made such progress as to astound his doctors. The first sign that he might recover was when he was still supposedly unconscious and was visited by Bengals coach Marvin Lewis. His foot was hanging from his hospital bed, and when Lewis told him to put it back in the bed, Weathersby promptly put it back in his bed. The Bengals, believing that he would never play football again, cut him before the 2005 season.

It was reported by ESPN that doctors cleared him to resume work on May 17, 2006, and Weathersby announced plans to attempt a comeback to the NFL. In March 2008, he stated that he did not want to put himself at risk for a hit that could reverse the damage, as well as a desire to "follow God's will" and stepped away from professional football.
