= Richard Seigler =

American gridiron football player and coach (born 1980)

No. 54, 95
- Position: Linebacker

Personal information
- Born: October 19, 1980 (age 46); Las Vegas, Nevada, U.S.
- Listed height: 6 ft 2 in (1.88 m)
- Listed weight: 238 lb (108 kg)

Career information
- High school: Chaparral (Las Vegas, Nevada)
- College: Oregon State
- NFL draft: 2004: 4th round, 127th overall pick

Career history

Playing
- San Francisco 49ers (2004); Pittsburgh Steelers (2005–2006); Toronto Argonauts (2008–2009)

Coaching
- Portland State University (2010–2011) Assistant defensive line coach

Awards and highlights
- Super Bowl champion (2005); 2× First-team All-Pac-10 (2002, 2003); Second-team All-Pac-10 (2001)
- Stats at Pro Football Reference

Richard Joseph Seigler (born October 19, 1980) is an American former professional football linebacker who played in the National Football League (NFL) and Canadian Football League (CFL). He was drafted out of Oregon State University in 2004 by the San Francisco 49ers. In November 2005, he was acquired by the Pittsburgh Steelers, and was on the Super Bowl XL-winning Steelers team. He finished up his playing years with the Toronto Argonauts of the CFL.

== Early life ==
Seigler was born and raised in Las Vegas and attended Chaparral High School. Seigler was the oldest of 9 children, having 5 brothers and 3 sisters. Seigler was selected First-team All-Sunrise Conference as a linebacker and wide receiver as a senior. Seigler was also a basketball player, and was selected All-Conference at Forward while leading his team in scoring and rebounding.

Highlights

- 1998:
  - High School All-Conference Defensive MVP Award
  - 1st Team All-Star Linebacker and Wide receiver (Sunrise 4A Region - Las Vegas)

== College career ==
Commenting on Seigler's natural leadership ability and selection as an OSU Team Captain, Brooks Hatch of the Corvallis Gazette-Times wrote, "It's a rare honor for an underclassman. In the past 30-odd years only 4 other non-senior Beavers have earned that distinction." Seigler played under the tutelage of National Championship Head Coach Dennis Erickson and Mike Riley in the college ranks.

=== College career statistics ===
- 356 tackles (#4 Best Mark Ever at Oregon State)
- 53 Tackles-For-Loss Career (7 TFL in a single game against Arizona State October 20, 2001. #1 on Oregon State All-Time List)
- 7 sacks
- 4 recovered fumbles
- 17 pass breakups
- 9 interceptions (1 INT returned for 65-yard Touchdown)
- 49 consecutive starts (2nd All-Time at Oregon State)

=== Highlights and awards ===
- 2010:
  - Pac-10 All-Decade Team
  - Oregon State All-Decade Team
- 2009:
  - Selected #7 Best Player of the 2000s for Oregon State
- 2004:
  - Invited to play in 79th Annual East-West Shrine Game
- 2003:
  - Oregon State Beavers Co-MVP (along with Dwan Edwards and Steven Jackson)
  - 1st Team Defense All-Star LB (Pac-10)
  - Surpassed All-American Inoke Breckterfield to become OSU's All-Time Defensive Point Record Holder with 1,344
  - Bronko Nagurski Trophy Watch List
  - Rotary Lombardi Award Watch List
  - Las Vegas Bowl champion
  - OSU Football Team Captain
- 2002:
  - 1st Team Defense All-Star LB (Pac-10)
  - Butkus Award Watch List
  - OSU Football Team Captain
- 2001:
  - Fiesta Bowl champion (Only Freshman starter on Championship Team)
  - 2nd Team All-Star LB (Pac-10)
- 2000:
  - Freshman All-American LB
  - Oregon State University "Male Newcomer of the Year" Award

== Coaching career ==
Seigler was the defensive line assistant coach of the Portland State Vikings college football team.

== 2007 investigation ==
Although the case was dismissed and Seigler was innocent, in May 2007, a Las Vegas news affiliate learned that Seigler was under investigation in connection to a prostitution ring operating in the city. He was released from the Pittsburgh Steelers. Seigler surrendered himself to Pittsburgh police and U.S. Marshals and was accused of pandering and providing transportation for a prostitute. All charges were dismissed in March 2008, and he expressed a desire to play in the NFL again. The Steelers did not reacquire Seigler after all charges were dropped. Seigler then ventured to play in the CFL for the Toronto Argonauts and work his way back into the NFL. In 2010 Nigel Burton, Head Coach of the Portland State Vikings, offered Seigler a spot on the coaching staff. Burton told the Portland Tribune, "It's unfortunate his name got dragged through the mud. I believe in second chances, but to be honest, this isn't even a second chance for the guy. He is working hard. You can't kick him out of the office. He wants to be a great coach. He and I are a lot alike in that regard. We love a challenge. You question me and my character, I'll show you. You question my ability to coach, I'll show you. That's how he is. That's why I love him, and I'm glad he is here."
