= Chaparral High School (Paradise, Nevada) =

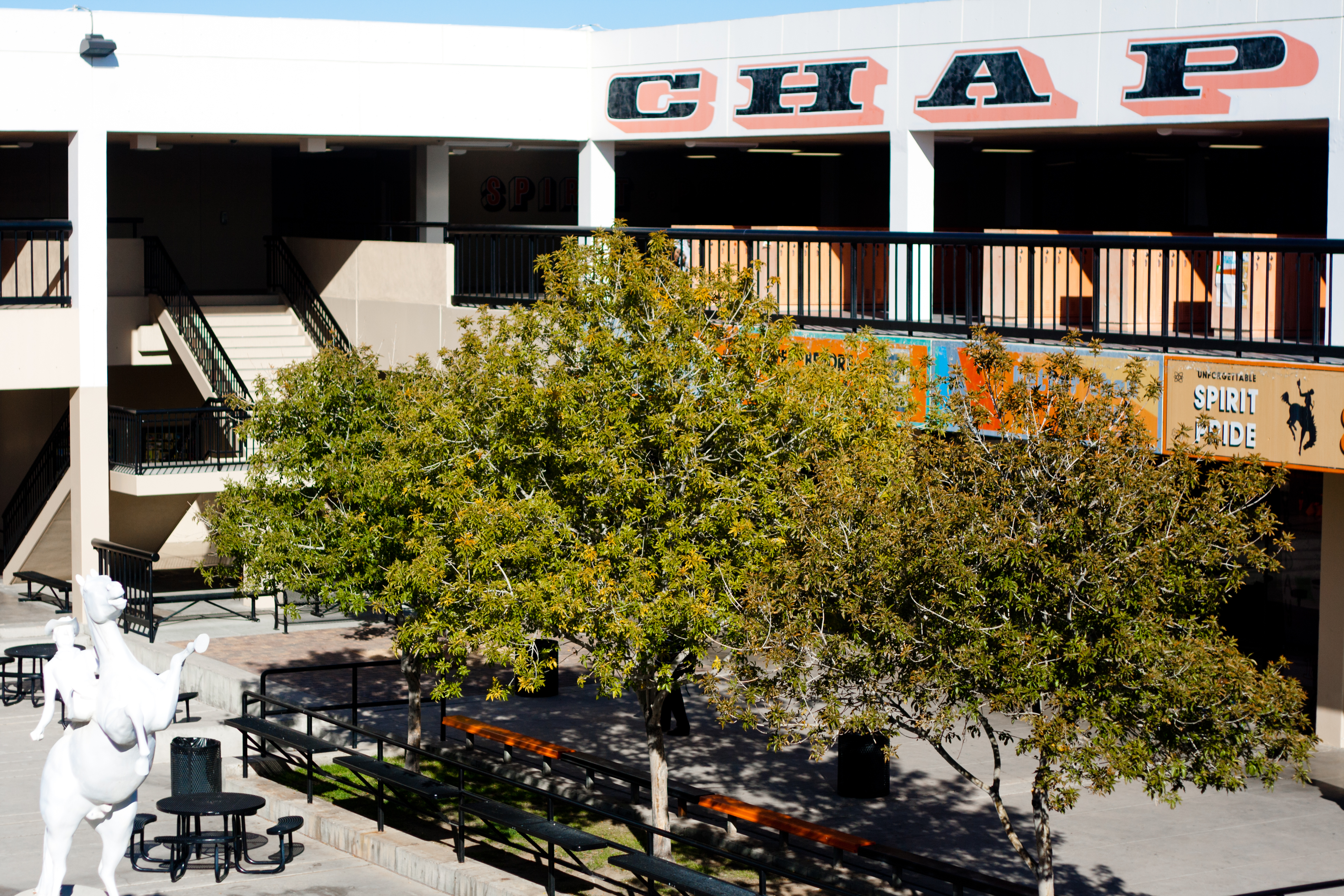

Location
- 3850 Annie Oakley Drive; Las Vegas, Nevada 89121; United States; 36.12004°N 115.08692°W

Information
- School type: Public high school
- Motto: Rigor, Relevance, Relationships, and Responsibility
- Established: 1973
- School district: Clark County School District
- Dean: Dean Cummings
- Principal: Thomas Smith
- Staff: 79.00 (FTE)
- Grades: 9-12
- Enrollment: 2,242 (2023-2024)
- Student to teacher ratio: 28.38
- Colours: Orange, Black,
- Athletics conference: Mountain 4A Region
- Team name: Cowboys
- Website: www.chaparrallasvegas.com

Chaparral High School is a public high school in Clark County School District located in Las Vegas, Nevada. It is located in the east side of the valley. The school was established in the fall of 1973. Its mascot is Kevin the Cowboy and its school colors are orange, black, and white. The school's fight song is the theme from the classic western The Magnificent Seven composed by Elmer Bernstein.

== History ==
The school opened in 1973. The two-story campus was designed by Caudill, Rowlett, Scott & Jack Miller & Associates. Construction started in September 1971, and was undertaken by Del E. Webb Corporation.

== Extracurricular activities ==
Chaparral High School is home to a variety of clubs and organizations, including choir, band, orchestra, dance, cheer leading, theatre and also includes a Navy JROTC unit.

== Athletics ==
Chaparral's athletics program is known as the Cowboys and competes in the Sunset 1A Region. The Cowboys have a prominent rivalry with Eldorado in football - The Battle for Merlin Olsen's Cleat - which began in 1973. Chaparral won the 2008 game, defeating Eldorado 17 to 14. The Cowboys hold a substantial lead in the series 28-14. Chaparral has won 10 of the last 17 meetings; although there was a record four-game losing streak in the early-2000s. In the fall of 2012 Chaparral football team took back the Cleat in a 52-14 victory. Also in the fall of 2013 Chaparral kept the cleat only to lose it to Eldo in 2014.

=== Nevada Interscholastic Activities Association State Championships ===
- Baseball - 1980, 1991
- Cross Country (Boys) - 1978
- Football - 1977
- Soccer (Boys) - 1993, 2001
- Soccer (Girls) - 2001, 2002, 2004
- Wrestling - 1976, 1977, 1978, 1983
- Golf (Boys) - 1987, 2010
- Volleyball (Boys) - 1992, 1993, 1994, 1995, 2001
- Volleyball (Girls) - 1982, 1984, 1994
- Track and Field (Boys) - 1993, 1994.
- Tennis (Boys) - 1980, 1981, 1990, 1991, 1993
- Softball - 1983

== Notable alumni ==
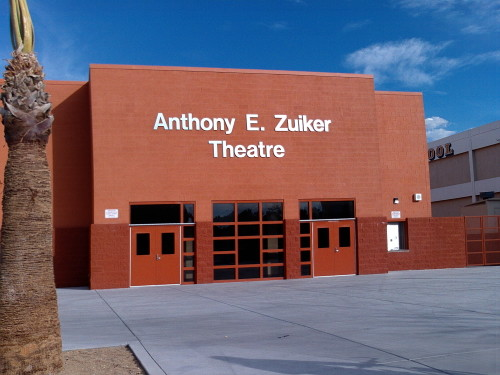
Anthony E. Zuiker Theatre

- Dustin Lee Abraham - writer and producer (How High, CSI: Crime Scene Investigation)
- Mark Slaughter ('81) - musician (Slaughter)
- Pace Mannion (76) -NBA Basketball Player
- Ginger Fish ('83) - musician (Marilyn Manson, Rob Zombie)
- Sean "Hollywood" Hamilton (Freshman only) - National Radio Personality
- Anthony E. Zuiker ('86) - writer and executive producer (CSI: Crime Scene Investigation, CSI: Miami, CSI: NY), new school theatre is named after him
- Joey Slotnick ('86) - television and film actor
- Greg Martinez ('90) - Former MLB player (Milwaukee Brewers)
- Jennifer Cole Dorsey ('90) - United States district judge of the United States District Court for the District of Nevada.
- Mark Stoermer ('95) - musician (The Killers)
- Richard Seigler ('99) - football player and coach
- Brandon Flowers ('99) - musician (The Killers)
- Brandyn Dombrowski ('99-2002) - NFL Left Tackle for San Diego Chargers
- Will Hernandez ('13) - NFL Offensive Linesman for the New York Giants.
