= Nick Murphy (American football) =

American football player (born 1979)

Profile
- Position: Punter

Personal information
- Born: October 22, 1979 (age 47); St. Louis, Missouri, U.S.

Career information
- High school: Desert Mountain (Scottsdale, Arizona)
- College: Arizona State

Career history
- 2002, 2003: Minnesota Vikings*
- 2003: Barcelona Dragons (Europa)
- 2004: Philadelphia Eagles*
- 2004: Scottish Claymores (Europa)
- 2004: Baltimore Ravens
- 2004: Kansas City Chiefs
- 2005: Philadelphia Eagles
- * Offseason or practice squad member only

Awards and highlights
- 2× All-NFL Europe (2003, 2004); Second-team All-Pac-10 (2001)
- Stats at Pro Football Reference

Nicholas Jon Murphy (born October 22, 1979) was an American football punter with four years spent between the National Football League (NFL) and NFL Europa. Two of these three years were spent playing in Europe.

== Early life and career ==
Murphy was born in Saint Louis, Missouri. A three-year letterman at Arizona State, Murphy was a Ray Guy Award semi-finalist as the nation's top punter and was named honorable mention and second-team All-Pac-10. He was also named to the Academic All-Pac 10 Team twice.

Murphy was an undrafted rookie free agent with the Minnesota Vikings in April 2002. He was released during Training Camp. Following this he played with NFL Europa's Barcelona Dragons. He spent the 2003 and 2004 seasons honing his skills in NFL Europa, playing with Barcelona and the Scottish Claymores, and was voted to the All NFL Europe Team in both seasons.

In 2004, Murphy enjoyed a three-game stint with Baltimore, subbing for an injured Dave Zastudil. He played in five regular season NFL games with the Ravens and Chiefs in 2004, punting 22 times for 966 yards (43.9 gross, 37.3 net) with seven inside the 20 and three touchbacks. In 2005, he appeared in one game for the Philadelphia Eagles in their victory over Brett Favre and the Green Bay Packers.

== Criminal ==
Nick was indicted on federal child sex charges on August 8, 2024. He faces one count of knowingly traveling and transporting a female under the age of 18 with the purpose of sexual criminal activity.

== Career stats ==
Season	Team	Punts	Yards	Average	Long	Inside 20	Inside 10	Touchbacks	Net Average
2004	BAL	18	777	43.2	54	6	0	2	36.6
2004	KC	4	189	47.3	58	1	0	1	40.8
2004	2 TMS	22	966	43.9	58	7	0	3	37.3
2005	PHI	7	275	39.3	44	1	0	0	33.7
TOTALS		29	1241	42.8	58	8	0	3	36.4

== Professional ==
Murphy worked as an athlete for 7 years. He earned his undergraduate degree from Arizona State University while playing for their team, the Sun Devils. He went on to play in the NFL and NFL Europe leagues.

After a sales career for CareerBuilder, Monster.com and Indeed, Murphy founded Mid-America Careers, a job site that covers the Midwestern United States serving local employers. He also started Job Spot, Inc, a consulting firm for recruiters.

He has been featured in HR.com's HR Genius series. Currently, he is on several advisory boards and is the author of the book Ahead of the Curve – Navigating 21st Century Recruitment Challenges for Ultimate Talent Acquisition Success.

== Education ==
Nick Murphy earned his undergraduate degree from Arizona State University in Broadcast Management (BA) in 2002, and an M.B.A. the WP Carey School of Business at Arizona State in 2010.
