= Richard Smith (wide receiver) =

American football player (born 1980)

No. 17
- Position: Wide receiver

Personal information
- Born: July 16, 1980 (age 46); Shreveport, Louisiana, U.S.
- Listed height: 5 ft 10 in (1.78 m)
- Listed weight: 191 lb (87 kg)

Career information
- High school: Evangel Christian Academy (LA)
- College: Arkansas

Career history
- 2004–2005: Kansas City Chiefs
- 2005: Seattle Seahawks*
- 2005–2006: Washington Redskins*
- 2006: Hamburg Sea Devils
- * Offseason or practice squad member only
- Stats at Pro Football Reference

Richard Smith Jr. (born July 16, 1980) is an American former professional football player who was a wide receiver for four games with the Kansas City Chiefs of the National Football League (NFL). He spent time on the practice rosters for the Washington Redskins and the Seattle Seahawks.

Smith played college football for the Arkansas Razorbacks and was a long jumper for the Razorback track team.
