= Chris Horn (American football) =

American football player (born 1977)

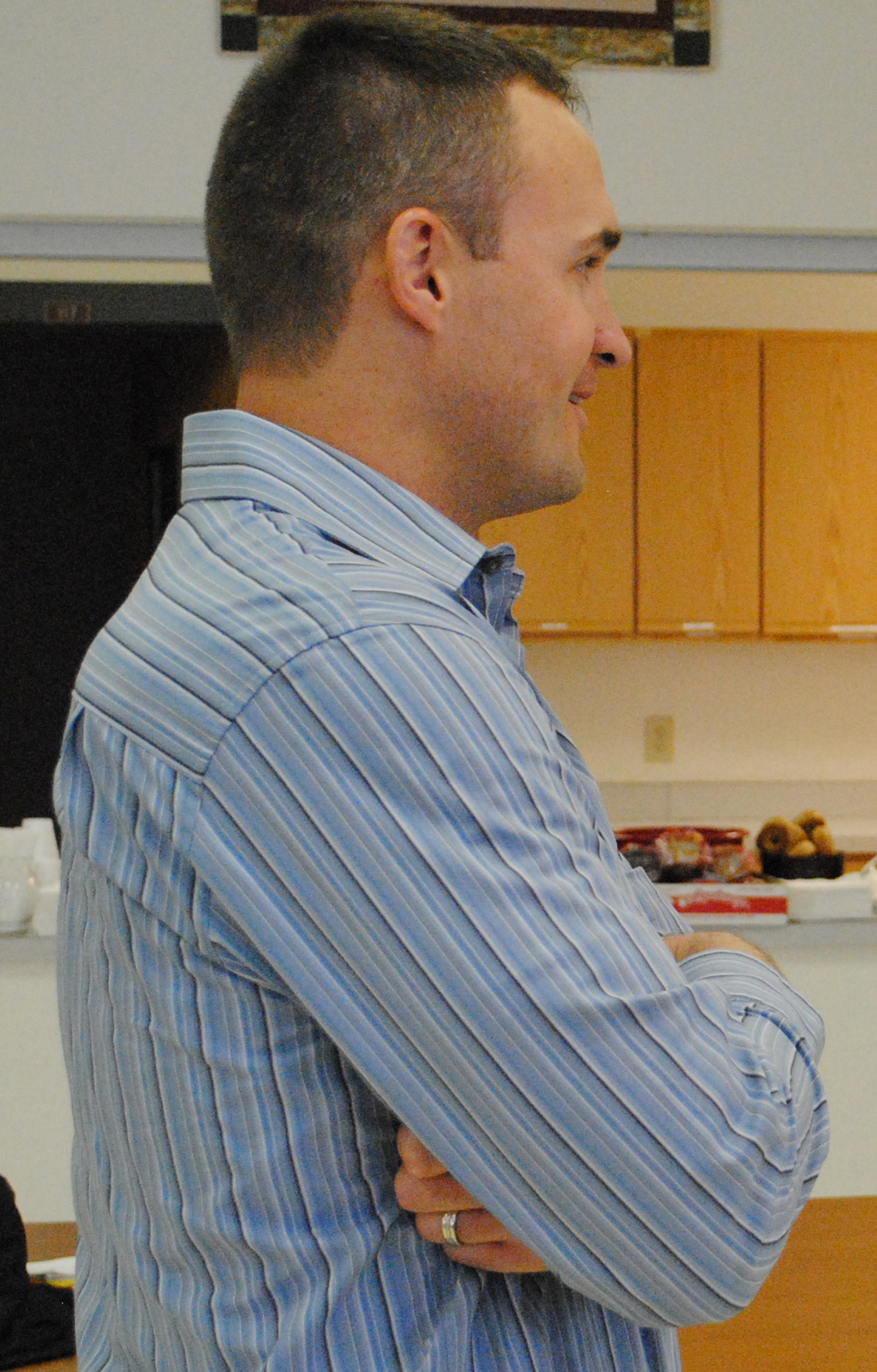

No. 81
- Position: Wide receiver

Personal information
- Born: July 13, 1977 (age 49); Caldwell, Idaho, U.S.
- Listed height: 5 ft 11 in (1.80 m)
- Listed weight: 200 lb (91 kg)

Career information
- High school: Notus (ID)
- College: Rocky Mountain
- NFL draft: 2000: undrafted

Career history
- Billings Thunderbolts (2000); Arizona Rattlers (2001–2003); Kansas City Chiefs (2003–2005); Amsterdam Admirals (2004); New Orleans Saints (2006)*; Carolina Panthers (2007)*; New Orleans VooDoo (2008)
- * Offseason or practice squad member only

Awards and highlights
- First-team All-Arena (2002)

Career NFL statistics
- Receptions: 33
- Receiving yards: 365
- TDs: 1
- Stats at Pro Football Reference

Chris Horn (born July 13, 1977) is an American former professional football player who was a wide receiver for the Kansas City Chiefs of the National Football League (NFL). He played college football for the Rocky Mountain Battlin' Bears.

== College career ==
Horn played college football at Rocky Mountain College in Billings, Montana. He is the only player from Rocky Mountain College to make the National Football League (NFL).

== Professional career ==
Chris Horn signed with his first professional team, the Billings Thunderbolts of the Indoor Football League in 2000. He then moved to the AFL, playing for the Arizona Rattlers from 2001–2003.

Horn entered the NFL as a free agent in 2003 signing with the Kansas City Chiefs spending four games on their practice squad. In 2004, he was allocated the Amsterdam Admirals of NFL Europa. In the 2004 NFL season, Horn began the year with the Chiefs on the practice squad until he was signed to their active roster on September 26. His first career touchdown came on September 26, 2004 against the Houston Texans. His first career start came in the 2005 season on October 13 against the San Diego Chargers.

In 2006, Chris Horn attended the New Orleans Saints training camp but was waived before the season started. In 2007, he had a similar experience with the Carolina Panthers.

In 2008, Horn was acquired in a trade with the Philadelphia Soul by the New Orleans VooDoo in the Arena Football League. Horn was released by New Orleans on March 10, 2008.

== Personal life ==
Chris and his family are devout Roman Catholics. Horn speaks regularly as a part of the Catholic Athletes for Christ ministry.
