= Kevin Arbet =

American football player (born 1981)

Profile
- Position: Cornerback

Personal information
- Born: March 26, 1981 (age 45); Stockton, California, U.S.
- Listed height: 5 ft 11 in (1.80 m)
- Listed weight: 187 lb (85 kg)

Career information
- College: USC

Career history
- 2006: San Jose SaberCats

Awards and highlights
- First-team All-Pac-10 (2001)

Kevin Arbet (born March 26, 1981) is an American former football cornerback for the Tampa Bay Buccaneers (NFL) and the Arena Football League (AFL)'s San Jose SaberCats. His uncle, Darren Arbet was the head coach of the SaberCats.

== Early life ==
Arbet prepped at St. Mary's High School in Stockton, California.

== College career ==
Arbet played college football at the University of Southern California.

== Personal life ==
His stepfather is Jeff Simmons, a 1983 draft choice of the then Los Angeles Rams. As well, his younger brother Ewing Simmons played college football with the University of New Mexico as a weak side defensive lineman.
