= 2007 Kansas City Chiefs season =

48th season in franchise history; first full one after Lamar Hunt

- Owner: The Hunt family (Clark Hunt Chairman and CEO)
- General manager: Carl Peterson
- Head coach: Herm Edwards
- Offensive coordinator: Mike Solari
- Defensive coordinator: Gunther Cunningham
- Home stadium: Arrowhead Stadium

Results
- Record: 4–12
- Division place: 3rd AFC West
- Playoffs: Did not qualify
- All-Pros: 2: TE Tony Gonzalez (2nd team); DE Jared Allen (1st team)
- Pro Bowlers: 2: TE Tony Gonzalez; DE Jared Allen

Uniform
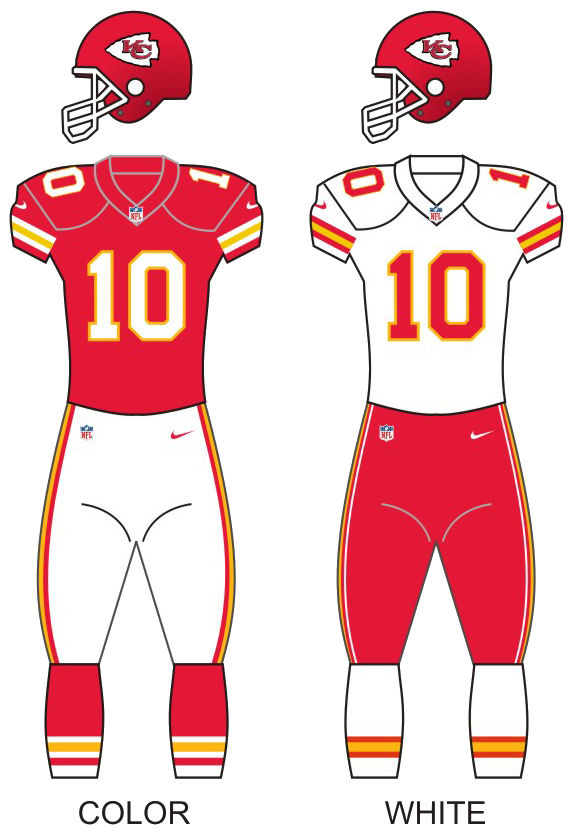

The 2007 season was the Kansas City Chiefs' 38th in the National Football League (NFL), their 48th overall, and their second under head coach Herm Edwards.

The team looking to improve on their 9–7 record in 2006 and attempting to secure the franchise's first back-to-back playoff berth since 1995. The season ended with a nine-game losing streak, the team's first since 1987 and a 4–12 record. It was the Chiefs' first season with twelve losses since 1978.

Considered a year of transition, the 2007 season marked the Chiefs' forty-fifth season in Kansas City, Missouri, and final before renovations began at Arrowhead Stadium.

Quarterback Trent Green was traded to the Miami Dolphins, leaving the door open for second-year quarterback Brodie Croyle or back-up quarterback Damon Huard to win the starting job. Huard was named starting quarterback on August 25 for the team's first game of the season, but Croyle replaced him after Huard was injured in the game against Denver in Week 10.

Five different running backs were used after Larry Johnson was injured in Week 9 against Green Bay. The team also had no stability at quarterback with Croyle and Huard, who both nursed injuries throughout the season, while their offensive line depleted following the retirement of their former Pro Bowl guard Will Shields.

To honor their late team owner and founder Lamar Hunt, the Chiefs wore a special American Football League patch on their uniforms with the initials "LH" emblazoned inside the logo's football.

== Offseason ==
The Chiefs' off-season began with turmoil over the contract of Tony Gonzalez, and the long-term status of Trent Green in Kansas City.

=== New quarterback ===
For the first time in almost 20 years the Chiefs entered training camp with some doubt about their starting quarterback.

"It’s going to be open for competition and that’s what’s good about it. If Trent Green decides to come back, it’s going to be the same three guys and they are going to compete. You have to leave it at that; let them compete for the position and see who wins out."
~Herman Edwards, in March 2007.

Reserve quarterback Damon Huard was signed to a three-year contract in February and Trent Green was not only asked to restructure his contract, but also offered in trades to other teams. Quarterback Brodie Croyle, who was drafted in 2006, was in contention with Huard to succeed Green throughout the offseason. The Chiefs had said that Green would be welcome to return and compete for the job as well if he was not traded, but Green refused. After the draft had passed, Trent Green was still listed on the Chiefs' roster, but Green's agent stated that Green would not return to the Chiefs for the 2007 season. On June 5, the Chiefs traded Green to the Miami Dolphins.

On August 25, Damon Huard was named the starting quarterback for the season opener against the Houston Texans. Croyle was chosen to be the starter months later on November 12.

=== Running back drama ===
As rumors spread concerning the Chiefs' quarterback situation, more emerged concerning their starting running back, Larry Johnson. The Kansas City Star, without citing a source, reported that the team had offered Johnson up for trade in the weeks before the 2007 NFL draft. The 27-year-old Johnson participated in all of the Chiefs' off-season program, but was entering the final year of his contract. Johnson reportedly made it clear he wanted a deal worth more than the eight-year, $60 million contract San Diego Chargers running back LaDainian Tomlinson signed in 2005. The Chiefs invited four running backs—California's Marshawn Lynch, Ohio State's Antonio Pittman, Florida State's Lorenzo Booker and Louisville's Kolby Smith—for interviews, and had said they were willing to draft a running back in the early rounds. The Chiefs later selected Kolby Smith in the fifth round of the 2007 NFL draft.

On June 21, Johnson stated that he was willing to sit out the Chiefs' training camp unless he and the Chiefs reach an agreement on a new contract. Johnson was absent at the start of training camp as contract talks were stalled. On July 25, reports surfaced of former starting running back Priest Holmes informing the team that he would arrive at training camp on the third day of practice (Saturday, July 28). Holmes was considered to be either acting as leverage to re-sign Johnson or even reclaim the starting position for himself if Johnson had decided to sit out. Holmes had not played since the middle of the 2005 season after suffering a severe neck injury against the San Diego Chargers, but remained on the team's payroll and roster.

On August 21, Johnson and the Chiefs agreed to a five-year contract extension that secured Johnson's status with the Chiefs through the 2012 season. As a result of this extension, Johnson became the highest-paid running back in the NFL based on average salary per year. The contract is worth $45 million, with $19 million guaranteed. Of the guaranteed money, $12 million is the signing bonus and $7 million is guaranteed salary.

On August 30, Johnson played his first pre-season game in the 2007 exhibition season, carrying the ball only 3 times in the first quarter of the Chiefs' match-up against the St. Louis Rams. Holmes officially retired in November.

=== Suspensions ===
On April 27, defensive end Jared Allen was suspended for the first four games of the 2007 season. Also, despite earlier stating that he would seek a trade, Allen announced that he would return to the Chiefs, and signed a one-year contract. On July 16, Allen's suspension was reduced to two games following an appeal.

=== Free agency ===
The Chiefs had nineteen free-agent players heading into the 2007 off-season.

Position	Player	Tag	Date signed	2007 team	Contract (with KC)
DE	Jared Allen	RFA	May 22	Kansas City Chiefs	One year
OT	Jordan Black	UFA	March 8	Houston Texans	
RB	Dee Brown	UFA	Released		
FB	Ronnie Cruz	ERFA	Released		
DT	Ron Edwards	UFA	March 15	Kansas City Chiefs	Four years
LB	Keyaron Fox	RFA	N/A	Kansas City Chiefs	N/A
LS	Kendall Gammon	UFA	Released		
TE	Tony Gonzalez	RFA	January 12	Kansas City Chiefs	Five years
LB	Kris Griffin	ERFA	May 23	Cleveland Browns	
QB	Damon Huard	UFA	February 27	Kansas City Chiefs	Three years
LB	Kawika Mitchell	UFA	March 27	New York Giants	
WR	Samie Parker	RFA	N/A	Kansas City Chiefs	N/A
DT	James Reed	RFA	April 17	Kansas City Chiefs	Three years
OT	Kevin Sampson	RFA	N/A	Kansas City Chiefs	N/A
CB	Benny Sapp	RFA	April 17	Kansas City Chiefs	One year
LB	Rich Scanlon	RFA	N/A	Kansas City Chiefs	N/A
K	Lawrence Tynes	RFA	May 22	New York Giants	
CB	Lenny Walls	UFA	March 25	St. Louis Rams	
DE	Jimmy Wilkerson	UFA	March 17	Kansas City Chiefs	One year
RFA: Restricted free agent, UFA: Unrestricted free agent, ERFA: Exclusive rights free agent

==== Team additions ====
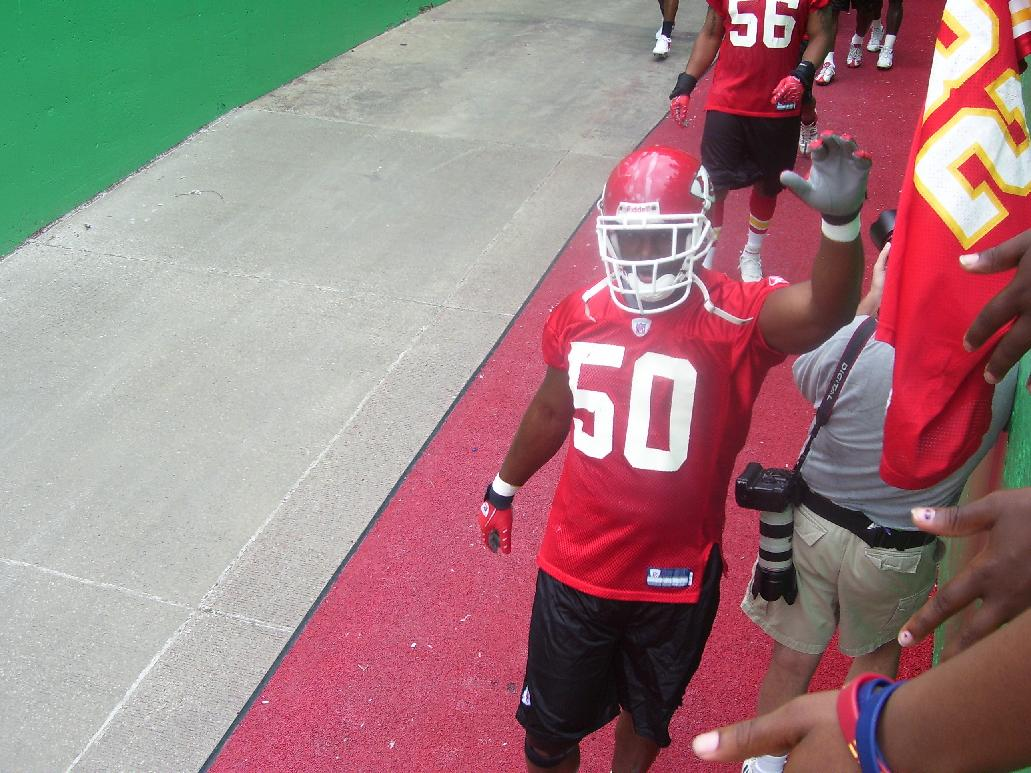
Napoleon Harris was signed in March to a six-year contract.

In January, the Chiefs agreed to terms on a two-year deal with offensive tackle Ramiro Pruneda from Monterrey Tech in Monterrey, Mexico.

In March, the Chiefs signed both offensive tackle Damion McIntosh and middle linebacker Napoleon Harris to six-year contracts. The team also signed long snapper J. P. Darche. Insideside linebacker Donnie Edwards, defensive tackle Alfonso Boone, and strong safety Jon McGraw.

In May, the Chiefs signed 16 undrafted rookie free agents for OTA's. Among those signed were Tyron Brackenridge and Dimitri Patterson, both of whom remained on the Chiefs' 53-man roster throughout the season.

In August, the Chiefs signed kick returner Eddie Drummond to a one-year contract. The Chiefs also signed wide receiver Bobby Sippio to their practice squad.

Throughout the season, the Chiefs used three different kickers. Rookie Justin Medlock started only one game (at Houston) before his release the following day due to his poor performance in the game, as well as the pre-season. Dave Rayner was acquired through waivers from Green Bay, but later released after a Week 12 loss to Oakland. Lastly, Kansas City acquired John Carney after his release from Jacksonville, and remained on the active roster through the end of the season.

==== Departures ====
On March 21, strong safety Sammy Knight and offensive tackle Kyle Turley were released. Turley was subsequently re-signed on July 21 after contemplating retirement.

On April 15, offensive guard Will Shields announced his retirement. On April 25, the Chiefs traded wide receiver/kick returner Dante Hall to the St. Louis Rams for a fifth round pick, and both teams also swapped picks in the third round (Kansas City moved up two spots).

In May, the Chiefs released defensive end Eric Hicks and linebacker Kris Griffin, and traded defensive tackle Ryan Sims to the Tampa Bay Buccaneers for 2009 NFL draft selection. Kansas City also traded kicker Lawrence Tynes to the New York Giants.

In June, reports surfaced concerning safety Greg Wesley and a trade to the Denver Broncos. The teams had agreed on terms of draft-choice compensation, but the Chiefs did not finalize the trade in fear of sending him to a division rival. Wesley remained on the team throughout the entire season.

In October, the Chiefs traded running back Michael Bennett to the Tampa Bay Buccaneers for two future undisclosed draft picks in 2008 and 2009.

On November 21, running back Priest Holmes retired from the NFL.

==== Trent Green trade ====
On March 6, Chiefs general manager Carl Peterson announced that quarterback Trent Green was asked to restructure his contract to remain with the team. Green was also granted permission to explore options of a trade to another team. The February contract agreement with Damon Huard, who would have been an unrestricted free agent, was the first public indication that Green's job was in danger. The first team to have contacted the Chiefs' front office was the Miami Dolphins, but Miami constantly disagreed in negotiations. The Dolphins offered a seventh round draft pick to the Chiefs, but the Chiefs declined, instead seeking a second round pick in exchange for Green. The Detroit Lions, and Cleveland Browns were also interested in Green, who are both looking for a veteran quarterback. Green had told the Chiefs that Miami was his preference being that he previously worked under both head coach Cam Cameron and quarterbacks coach Terry Shea. On draft day, the Chiefs and Dolphins could not reach a deal to trade Green. The Chiefs changed their request to a fourth-round pick while the Dolphins offered a sixth round pick. As weeks passed with some believing that Green would remain with the Chiefs, Green's agent reiterated that Green would not return to play for Kansas City.

On June 5, the Chiefs agreed to trade Green to the Miami Dolphins for a conditional fifth round pick in the 2008 NFL draft, pending a physical from Green. The pick can be upgraded to a fourth-round selection if Green were to reach certain predetermined playing time and performance levels. Green was injured while playing with the Dolphins, and missed most of the season, resulting in a fifth-round selection for Kansas City for 2008.

=== Draft ===
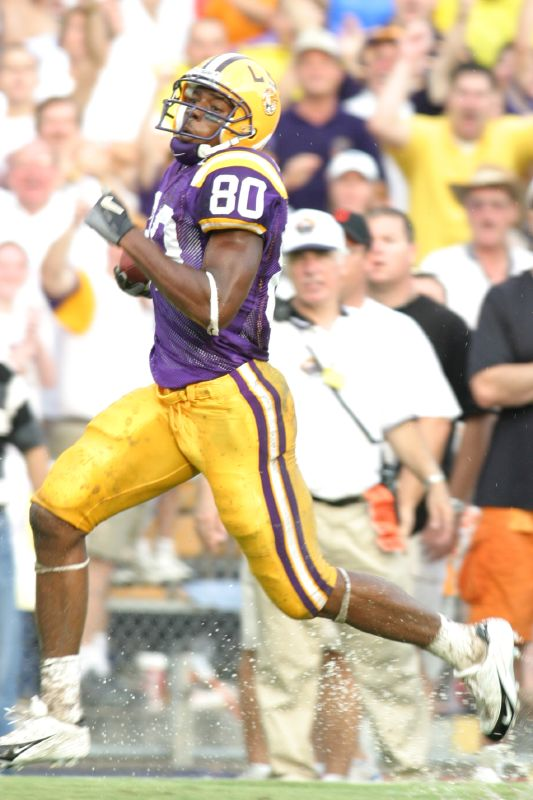
Dwayne Bowe was selected 23rd overall by Kansas City in the 2007 NFL Draft and made an immediate impact on the team's wide receiver corp.

Note: In 2006, the Chiefs traded their fourth round draft pick to the New Orleans Saints in exchange for running back Michael Bennett.

2007 Kansas City Chiefs draft
Round	Selection	Player	Position	College	Contract
1	23	Dwayne Bowe	Wide receiver	LSU	Five years
2	54	Claude "Turk" McBride	Defensive end	Tennessee	Three years
3	82^{[a]}	DeMarcus "Tank" Tyler	Defensive tackle	North Carolina State	Three years
5	148^{[a]}	Kolby Smith	Running back	Louisville	Three years
5	160	Justin Medlock	Kicker	UCLA	Three years
6	196	Herbert Taylor	Offensive tackle	TCU	Three years
7	231	Michael Allan	Tight end	Whitworth College	Three years

^{a} Obtained St. Louis' fifth round selection (#148) and swapped selections in the third round (Kansas City moved up from #84 to #82).

== Pre-season ==
=== Training camp ===
The Chiefs held their summer training camp at the University of Wisconsin–River Falls; their 17th consecutive year training at that location. The team departed for River Falls on July 26 with the first day of practice held on July 27. Kansas City held joint practice sessions with the Minnesota Vikings on August 3 in Mankato, Minnesota and on August 4 in River Falls. The Chiefs honored Greensburg, Kansas, and the town's high school football team by wearing special baseball hats to practice and also help raise money to help buy equipment for the Rangers football team and cheerleading squad following a devastating EF-5 tornado that destroyed the city.

The Chiefs' training camp was featured on the NFL Films–HBO joint feature Hard Knocks: Training Camp with the Kansas City Chiefs. The series, returning for its third season, and first in over four years, premiered Wednesday, August 8. Hour-long episodes aired each week, concluding on September 5.

Running back Larry Johnson and rookie wide receiver Dwayne Bowe were both absent at the beginning of training camp due to contract disputes. Bowe signed his contract on August 5 after being absent for one week, while Johnson agreed to his contract extension on August 21 after missing 25 days of practice. Priest Holmes arrived at camp on July 28 and was placed on the physically unable to perform list. Damon Huard and Brodie Croyle battled for the starting quarterback position, and Huard was chosen on August 25.

== Roster ==
Kansas City Chiefs 2007 final roster
Quarterbacks: 12 Brodie Croyle; 8 David Greene; 11 Damon Huard; Running backs: 26 Jackie Battle; 46 Boomer Grigsby FB; 30 Gilbert Harris; 21 Kolby Smith; Wide receivers: 82 Dwayne Bowe; 85 Eddie Drummond KR/PR; 18 Samie Parker; 83 Bobby Sippio; 80 Jeff Webb KR; Tight ends: 81 Michael Allan; 89 Jason Dunn; 88 Tony Gonzalez; 84 Kris Wilson	Offensive linemen: 73 Adrian Jones T; 60 Travis Leffew G/T; 77 Damion McIntosh T; 61 Tre' Stallings G; 71 Will Svitek T; 65 Herb Taylor G/T; 54 Brian Waters G; 76 John Welbourn G; 62 Casey Wiegmann C; Defensive linemen: 69 Jared Allen DE; 70 Alfonso Boone DT; 95 Ron Edwards DT; 91 Tamba Hali DE; 90 Turk McBride DE/DT; 92 James Reed DT; 72 Khreem Smith DE; 93 Tank Tyler DT; 96 Jimmy Wilkerson DE	Linebackers: 99 Kendrell Bell OLB; 59 Donnie Edwards OLB; 97 Keyaron Fox OLB; 50 Napoleon Harris MLB; 98 Nate Harris MLB/0LB; 56 Derrick Johnson OLB; 52 Mickey Pimentel OLB; Defensive backs: 35 Rashad Barksdale CB; 24 Ty Law CB; 47 Jon McGraw FS; 44 Jarrad Page FS; 22 Dimitri Patterson CB; 49 Bernard Pollard SS; 20 Benny Sapp CB/KR; 23 Patrick Surtain CB; 25 Greg Wesley SS; Special teams: 5 John Carney K; 2 Dustin Colquitt P; 51 J. P. Darche LS	Reserve lists: 57 Johnny Baldwin LB (IR); 67 Chris Bober C/G (IR); 34 Tyron Brackenridge CB (IR); 31 Priest Holmes RB (IR/Ret.); 27 Larry Johnson RB (IR); 87 Eddie Kennison WR/PR (IR); 64 Rudy Niswanger C (IR); 17 Maurice Price WR (IR); 4 Tyler Thigpen QB (IR); 55 Pat Thomas LB (IR); 74 Kyle Turley T (IR); Practice squad: 48 Zac Alcorn TE; 79 Jason Capizzi T; 45 Erick Harris S; 94 T. J. Jackson DT; 75 Joe Lobdell T; 15 Jeff Otis QB; 66 Rob Smith C/G; rookies in italics 53 active, 11 inactive, 7 practice squad

== Preseason ==
=== Schedule ===
Week	Date	Opponent	Result	Record	Venue	Recap
1	August 11	at Cleveland Browns	L 12–16	0–1	Cleveland Browns Stadium	Recap
2	August 16	Miami Dolphins	L 10–11	0–2	Arrowhead Stadium	Recap
3	August 23	New Orleans Saints	L 7–30	0–3	Arrowhead Stadium	Recap
4	August 30	at St. Louis Rams	L 3–10	0–4	Edward Jones Dome	Recap

=== Game summaries ===
==== Week 1: at Cleveland Browns ====
Week 1: Kansas City Chiefs at Cleveland Browns – Game summary

Quarter	1	2	3	4	Total
Chiefs	0	7	0	5	12
Browns	3	3	3	7	16

at Cleveland Browns Stadium, Cleveland, Ohio

- Date: August 11
- Game time: 7:30 p.m. EDT/6:30 p.m. CDT
- Game weather: Sunny, 85 °F (29 °C)
- Game attendance: 70,067
- Referee: Ron Winter
- Recap, Game Book

Game information

First quarter

- CLE – Phil Dawson 27-yard field goal, 1:33. Browns 3–0. Drive: 9 plays, 49 yards, 5:07.

Second quarter

- CLE – Phil Dawson 38-yard field goal, 8:40. Browns 6–0. Drive: 8 plays, 30 yards, 3:49.
- KC – Benny Sapp 56-yard fumble return (Justin Medlock kick), 4:02. Chiefs 7–6.

Third quarter

- CLE – Phil Dawson 32-yard field goal, 2:46. Browns 9–7. Drive: 12 plays, 61 yards, 6:00.

Fourth quarter

- KC – Rob Smith tackled in end zone by Kiki Gonzalez for a Safety, 12:43. Tied 9–9.
- KC – Justin Medlock 42-yard field goal, 1:48. Chiefs 12–9. Drive: 12 plays, 42 yards, 4:05.
- CLE – Chris Barclay 88-yard kickoff return (Phil Dawson kick), 1:36. Browns 16–12.

Top passers

- KC – Casey Printers – 8/17, 64 yards
- CLE – Charlie Frye – 12/15, 122 yards

Top rushers

- KC – Michael Bennett – 3 rushes, 28 yards
- CLE – Jerome Harrison – 8 rushes, 33 yards

Top receivers

- KC – Chris Hannon – 2 receptions, 26 yards
- CLE – Buck Ortega – 4 receptions, 39 yards

==== Week 2: vs. Miami Dolphins ====
Week 2: Miami Dolphins at Kansas City Chiefs – Game summary

Quarter	1	2	3	4	Total
Dolphins	0	3	0	8	11
Chiefs	0	7	0	3	10

at Arrowhead Stadium, Kansas City, Missouri

- Date: August 16
- Game time: 7:00 p.m. CDT
- Game weather: Overcast, 92 °F (33 °C)
- Game attendance: 70,217
- Referee: Pete Morelli
- Recap, Game Book

Game information

First quarter

- No scoring plays.

Second quarter

- MIA – Jay Feely 30-yard field goal, 14:17. Dolphins 3–0. Drive: 8 plays, 40 yards, 3:31.
- KC – Chris Hannon 21-yard pass from Brodie Croyle (Justin Medlock kick), 3:43. Chiefs 7–3. Drive: 8 plays, 70 yards, 3:44.

Third quarter

- No scoring plays.

Fourth quarter

- KC – Justin Medlock 34-yard field goal, 8:18. Chiefs 10–3. Drive: 8 plays, 45 yards, 4:25.
- MIA – Patrick Cobbs 7-yard run (John Beck run), 4:30. Dolphins 11–10. Drive: 7 plays, 73 yards, 3:48.

Top passers

- MIA – Cleo Lemon – 8/11, 52 yards
- KC – Casey Printers – 8/10, 122 yards

Top rushers

- MIA – Ronnie Brown – 13 rushes, 57 yards
- KC – Marcus O'Keith – 8 rushes, 21 yards

Top receivers

- MIA – Jesse Chatman – 5 receptions, 43 yards
- KC – Gilbert Harris – 2 receptions, 63 yards

==== Week 3: vs. New Orleans Saints ====
Week 3: New Orleans Saints at Kansas City Chiefs – Game summary

Quarter	1	2	3	4	Total
Saints	0	13	0	17	30
Chiefs	0	0	0	7	7

at Arrowhead Stadium, Kansas City, Missouri

- Date: August 23
- Game time: 7:30 p.m. CDT
- Game weather: Mostly fair, 90 °F (32 °C)
- Game attendance: 72,283
- Referee: Bill Carollo
- Recap, Game Book

Game information

First quarter

- No scoring plays.

Second quarter

- NO – Olindo Mare 28-yard field goal, 13:02. Saints 3–0. Drive: 11 plays, 50 yards, 4:40.
- NO – Olindo Mare 31-yard field goal, 6:37. Saints 6–0. Drive: 8 plays, 74 yards, 3:25.
- NO – David Patten 4-yard pass from Drew Brees (Olindo Mare kick), 2:27. Saints 13–0. Drive: 6 plays, 45 yards, 2:03.

Third quarter

- No scoring plays.

Fourth quarter

- NO – Olindo Mare 44-yard field goal, 14:26. Saints 16–0. Drive: 10 plays, 39 yards, 4:55.
- NO – Pierre Thomas 6-yard run (Olindo Mare kick), 9:40. Saints 23–0. Drive: 7 plays, 73 yards, 3:44.
- NO – Pierre Thomas 19-yard run (Olindo Mare kick), 4:51. Saints 30–0. Drive: 3 plays, 50 yards, 1:23.
- KC – Marcus O'Keith 2-yard run (Justin Medlock kick), 1:53. Saints 30–7. Drive: 7 plays, 62 yards, 2:58.

Top passers

- NO – Drew Brees – 17/19, 182 yards, TD
- KC – Jeff Terrell – 5/5, 54 yards

Top rushers

- NO – Pierre Thomas – 11 rushes, 90 yards, 2 TD
- KC – Michael Bennett – 7 rushes, 27 yards

Top receivers

- NO – Lance Moore – 6 receptions, 88 yards
- KC – Keith Willis – 2 receptions, 25 yards

==== Week 4: at St. Louis Rams ====
Week 4: Kansas City Chiefs at St. Louis Rams – Game summary

Quarter	1	2	3	4	Total
Chiefs	0	0	0	3	3
Rams	3	0	7	0	10

at Edward Jones Dome, St. Louis, Missouri

- Date: August 30
- Game time: 7:00 p.m. CDT
- Game weather: None (indoor stadium)
- Game attendance: 64,958
- Referee: Mike Carey
- Recap, Game Book

Game information

First quarter

- STL – Kevin Lovell 32-yard field goal, 8:47. Rams 3–0. Drive: 11 plays, 52 yards, 6:13.

Second quarter

- No scoring plays.

Third quarter

- STL – Marques Hagans 20-yard pass from Ryan Fitzpatrick (Kevin Lovell kick), 2:47. Rams 10–0. Drive: 10 plays, 61 yards, 5:17.

Fourth quarter

- KC – Justin Medlock 40-yard field goal, 2:46. Rams 10–3. Drive: 14 plays, 59 yards, 6:59.

Top passers

- KC – Jeff Terrell – 15/25, 117 yards, INT
- STL – Ryan Fitzpatrick – 12/18, 105 yards, TD

Top rushers

- KC – Kolby Smith – 7 rushes, 64 yards
- STL – Ryan Fitzpatrick – 7 rushes, 26 yards

Top receivers

- KC – Bobby Sippio – 2 receptions, 28 yards
- STL – Marques Hagans – 4 receptions, 53 yards, TD

== Regular season ==
=== Schedule ===
Week	Date	Opponent	Result	Record	Venue	Recap
1	September 9	at Houston Texans	**L** 3–20	0–1	Reliant Stadium	Recap
2	September 16	at Chicago Bears	**L** 10–20	0–2	Soldier Field	Recap
3	September 23	Minnesota Vikings	**W** 13–10	1–2	Arrowhead Stadium	Recap
4	September 30	at **San Diego Chargers**	**W** 30–16	2–2	Qualcomm Stadium	Recap
5	October 7	Jacksonville Jaguars	**L** 7–17	2–3	Arrowhead Stadium	Recap
6	October 14	Cincinnati Bengals	**W** 27–20	3–3	Arrowhead Stadium	Recap
7	October 21	at **Oakland Raiders**	**W** 12–10	4–3	McAfee Coliseum	Recap
8	Bye					
9	November 4	Green Bay Packers	**L** 22–33	4–4	Arrowhead Stadium	Recap
10	November 11	**Denver Broncos**	**L** 11–27	4–5	Arrowhead Stadium	Recap
11	November 18	at Indianapolis Colts	**L** 10–13	4–6	RCA Dome	Recap
12	November 25	**Oakland Raiders**	**L** 17–20	4–7	Arrowhead Stadium	Recap
13	December 2	**San Diego Chargers**	**L** 10–24	4–8	Arrowhead Stadium	Recap
14	December 9	at **Denver Broncos**	**L** 7–41	4–9	Invesco Field at Mile High	Recap
15	December 16	Tennessee Titans	**L** 17–26	4–10	Arrowhead Stadium	Recap
16	December 23	at Detroit Lions	**L** 20–25	4–11	Ford Field	Recap
17	December 30	at New York Jets	**L** 10–13 (OT)	4–12	Giants Stadium	Recap

Note: Intra-division opponents are in bold text.

=== Game summaries ===
==== Week 1: at Houston Texans ====
Week 1: Kansas City Chiefs at Hoston Texans – Game summary

Quarter	1	2	3	4	Total
Chiefs	0	0	3	0	**3**
**Texans**	0	10	7	3	**20**

at Reliant Stadium, Houston, Texas

- Date: September 9
- Game time: 12:00 p.m. CDT
- Game weather: None (retractable roof closed)
- Game attendance: 70,080
- Referee: Jerome Boger
- TV announcers (CBS): Ian Eagle and Solomon Wilcots
- Recap, Game Book

Game information

**First quarter**

- No scoring plays.

**Second quarter**

- HOU – Kris Brown 26-yard field goal, 7:33. Texans 3–0. **Drive: 7 plays, 21 yards, 3:54.**
- HOU – Andre Johnson 77-yard pass from Matt Schaub (Kris Brown kick), 6:01. Texans 10–0. **Drive: 1 play, 77 yards, 0:12.**

**Third quarter**

- HOU – Mario Williams 38-yard fumble return (Kris Brown kick), 14:01. Texans 17–0.
- KC – Justin Medlock 27-yard field goal, 0:26. Texans 17–3. **Drive: 11 plays, 63 yards, 6:30.**

**Fourth quarter**

- HOU – Kris Brown 28-yard field goal, 5:00. Texans 20–3. **Drive: 15 plays, 65 yards, 10:26.**

**Top passers**

- KC – Damon Huard – 22/33, 168 yards, 2 INT
- HOU – Matt Schaub – 16/22, 225 yards, TD, INT

**Top rushers**

- KC – Larry Johnson – 10 rushes, 43 yards
- HOU – Ahman Green – 16 rushes, 73 yards

**Top receivers**

- KC – Samie Parker – 4 receptions, 48 yards
- HOU – Andre Johnson – 7 receptions, 142 yards, TD

The game started out slow for both the Texans and Chiefs, but with Kansas City poised to score first, rookie placekicker Justin Medlock missed a 30-yard field goal. The Texans used their second possession to advance to the red zone, but a pass from Matt Schaub intended for Andre Johnson was intercepted by Chiefs safety Jarrad Page in the end zone. Beginning the second quarter, Chiefs center Casey Wiegmann fumbled the ball, but it was recovered by quarterback Damon Huard. After a possession by the Texans, kick returner Eddie Drummond fumbled and the ball was recovered by Houston. The Texans capitalized on the turnover and scored first through a field goal. With just over six minutes left in the half, Matt Schaub completed a 77-yard pass to Andre Johnson, and the Texans secured their lead, 10–0. Beginning the third quarter, Chiefs fullback Kris Wilson appeared to have fumbled the football, although it was disputed whether or not he had possession. The fumble was recovered by Texans defensive end Mario Williams for a touchdown. The Chiefs finally scored, through a field goal, with thirty seconds remaining in the third quarter. For the first ten minutes of play in the fourth quarter, the Texans controlled the ball and kept the Chiefs' offense off the field. When the Chiefs received their first chance to score in the fourth quarter with just over five minutes remaining, they failed to capitalize on offense.

For only the second time in Texans history, the franchise won their opening day game as the Chiefs began their season at 0–1. The Chiefs' Eddie Kennison pulled his hamstring on the team's first possession, and Patrick Surtain injured his shoulder.

RB Larry Johnson was limited by the Texans defense to just 43 yards on 10 carries.

==== Week 2: at Chicago Bears ====
Week 2: Kansas City Chiefs at Chicago Bears – Game summary

Quarter	1	2	3	4	Total
Chiefs	0	7	3	0	**10**
**Bears**	0	17	3	0	**20**

at Soldier Field, Chicago, Illinois

- Date: September 16
- Game time: 3:15 p.m. CDT
- Game weather: Clear, 70 °F (21 °C)
- Game attendance: 62,095
- Referee: Mike Carey
- TV announcers (CBS): Jim Nantz and Phil Simms
- Recap, Game Book

Game information

**First quarter**

- No scoring plays.

**Second quarter**

- CHI – John St. Clair 2-yard pass from Rex Grossman (Robbie Gould kick), 10:23. Bears 7–0. **Drive: 15 plays, 79 yards, 8:01.**
- CHI – Devin Hester 73-yard punt return (Robbie Gould kick), 9:15. Bears 14–0.
- CHI – Robbie Gould 47-yard field goal, 2:25. Bears 17–0. **Drive: 10 plays, 46 yards, 4:44.**
- KC – Dwayne Bowe 16-yard pass from Damon Huard (Dave Rayner kick), 1:17. Bears 17–7. **Drive: 4 plays, 83 yards, 1:08.**

**Third quarter**

- CHI – Robbie Gould 38-yard field goal, 8:31. Bears 20–7. **Drive: 4 plays, −2 yards, 2:20.**
- KC – Dave Rayner 45-yard field goal, 3:07. Bears 20–10. **Drive: 5 plays, 18 yards, 1:37.**

**Fourth quarter**

- No scoring plays.

**Top passers**

- KC – Damon Huard – 19/28, 175 yards, TD, INT
- CHI – Rex Grossman – 20/34, 160 yards, TD, 2 INT

**Top rushers**

- KC – Larry Johnson – 16 rushes, 55 yards
- CHI – Cedric Benson – 24 rushes, 101 yards

**Top receivers**

- KC – Jeff Webb – 4 receptions, 57 yards
- CHI – Bernard Berrian – 5 receptions, 65 yards

Following a road loss to the Texans, the Chiefs stayed on the road as they played the defending NFC champion Chicago Bears in a Week 2 interconference fight. After a scoreless first quarter, Kansas City got roasted in the second quarter with Bears QB Rex Grossman completed a 2-yard TD pass to OT John St. Clair, WR/PR Devin Hester returning a punt 73 yards for a touchdown, and kicker Robbie Gould getting a 47-yard field goal. The Chiefs got their score of the period with QB Damon Huard completing a 16-yard TD pass to rookie WR Dwayne Bowe. In the third quarter, Chicago increased its lead with Gould kicking a 38-yard field goal, while Kansas City tried to keep up with kicker Dave Rayner got a 45-yard field goal. However, with no score by any team in the fourth quarter, the score stood as it was.

With the loss, the Chiefs fell to 0–2.

RB Larry Johnson was only able to get 55 rushing yards on 16 carries, giving him a two-game total of only 98 rushing yards on 26 total carries.

==== Week 3: vs. Minnesota Vikings ====
Week 3: Minnesota Vikings at Kansas City Chiefs – Game summary

Quarter	1	2	3	4	Total
Vikings	7	3	0	0	**10**
**Chiefs**	0	3	3	7	**13**

at Arrowhead Stadium, Kansas City, Missouri

- Date: September 23
- Game time: 12:00 p.m. CDT
- Game weather: Clear, 83 °F (28 °C)
- Game attendance: 78,038
- Referee: Walt Anderson
- TV announcers (Fox): Matt Vasgersian, J. C. Pearson and Jennifer Hammond
- Recap, Game Book

Game information

**First quarter**

- MIN – Adrian Peterson 11-yard run (Ryan Longwell kick), 10:02. Vikings 7–0. **Drive: 6 plays, 50 yards, 3:18.**

**Second quarter**

- MIN – Ryan Longwell 22-yard field goal, 9:18. Vikings 10–0. **Drive: 5 plays, 29 yards, 1:21.**
- KC – Dave Rayner 39-yard field goal, 3:32. Vikings 10–3. **Drive: 7 plays, 7 yards, 2:40.**

**Third quarter**

- KC – Dave Rayner 49-yard field goal, 2:58. Vikings 10–6. **Drive: 13 plays, 61 yards, 6:21.**

**Fourth quarter**

- KC – Dwayne Bowe 16-yard pass from Damon Huard (Dave Rayner kick), 9:23. Chiefs 13–10. **Drive: 12 plays, 84 yards, 5:47.**

**Top passers**

- MIN – Kelly Holcomb – 14/28, 169 yards
- KC – Damon Huard – 20/29, 206 yards, TD

**Top rushers**

- MIN – Adrian Peterson – 25 rushes, 102 yards, TD
- KC – Larry Johnson – 24 rushes, 42 yards

**Top receivers**

- MIN – Visanthe Shiancoe – 3 receptions, 51 yards
- KC – Tony Gonzalez – 7 receptions, 96 yards

Still searching for their first win of the year, the Chiefs went home to play a Week 3 interconference duel with the Minnesota Vikings. Very much a tale of two halves, Minnesota dominated through most of the first half. Larry Johnson of the Chiefs was ineffective against the Minnesota defense while Adrian Peterson rushed for 102 yards and a touchdown (mostly in the first half). After making changes during halftime, the Chiefs returned with a passing game and an amped up defense. The Chiefs' Jared Allen, back from suspension, led the defense with eight tackles, two sacks, and a forced fumble, shutting down the Vikings' offense. Chiefs' rookie Dwayne Bowe, with one reception coming into the game, benefited from the second half passing game with five receptions, including a touchdown.

With the win, the Chiefs improved to 1–2.

==== Week 4: at San Diego Chargers ====
Week 4: Kansas City Chiefs at San Diego Chargers – Game summary

Quarter	1	2	3	4	Total
**Chiefs**	0	6	10	14	**30**
Chargers	10	6	0	0	**16**

at Qualcomm Stadium, San Diego, California

- Date: September 30
- Game time: 3:15 p.m. CDT/1:15 p.m. PDT
- Game weather: Clear and sunny, 76 °F (24 °C)
- Game attendance: 65,175
- Referee: Larry Nemmers
- TV announcers (CBS): Dick Enberg and Randy Cross
- Recap, Game Book

Game information

**First quarter**

- SD – Nate Kaeding 24-yard field goal, 8:19. Chargers 3–0. **Drive: 12 plays, 66 yards, 6:41.**
- SD – LaDainian Tomlinson 5-yard run (Nate Kaeding kick), 3:56. Chargers 10–0. **Drive: 5 plays, 55 yards, 3:02.**

**Second quarter**

- KC – Dave Rayner 21-yard field goal, 11:10. Chargers 10–3. **Drive: 7 plays, 19 yards, 3:41.**
- SD – Nate Kaeding 51-yard field goal, 6:55. Chargers 13–3. **Drive: 4 plays, 3 yards, 2:20.**
- KC – Dave Rayner 25-yard field goal, 1:20. Chargers 13–6. **Drive: 7 plays, 41 yards, 2:55.**
- SD – Nate Kaeding 38-yard field goal, 0:00. Chargers 16–6. **Drive: 8 plays, 58 yards, 1:20.**

**Third quarter**

- KC – Dave Rayner 41-yard field goal, 5:28. Chargers 16–9. **Drive: 9 plays, 57 yards, 3:50.**
- KC – Tony Gonzalez 22-yard pass from Damon Huard (Dave Rayner kick), 1:50. Tied 16–16. **Drive: 3 plays, 36 yards, 0:39.**

**Fourth quarter**

- KC – Dwayne Bowe 51-yard pass from Damon Huard (Dave Rayner kick), 11:46. Chiefs 23–16. **Drive: 8 plays, 77 yards, 3:24.**
- KC – Tyron Brackenridge 50-yard fumble return (Dave Rayner kick), 7:24. Chiefs 30–16.

**Top passers**

- KC – Damon Huard – 17/29, 284 yards, 2 TD, 2 INT
- SD – Philip Rivers – 21/42, 211 yards, 2 INT

**Top rushers**

- KC – Larry Johnson – 25 rushes, 123 yards
- SD – LaDainian Tomlinson – 20 rushes, 132 yards, TD

**Top receivers**

- KC – Dwayne Bowe – 8 receptions, 164 yards, TD
- SD – Antonio Gates – 6 receptions, 79 yards

Coming off of a win at Arrowhead that gave Kansas City their first win of the season, they headed to San Diego to take on the Chargers and their new head coach, Norv Turner. Much like their previous game, the Chiefs began with a weak showing offensively before getting a lot of use out of their rookie wide receiver Dwayne Bowe, and a touchdown catch by Tony Gonzalez (his record-tying 62nd). The TD by Gonzalez tied him with Shannon Sharpe for the most touchdown receptions by a tight end. After another TD catch by Bowe, cornerback Tyron Brackenridge ran back a fumble by San Diego to effectively win the game for Kansas City.

Late into the fourth quarter, fans at Qualcomm Stadium voiced their displeasure with Turner by chanting "Marty! Marty! Marty!" in reference to former coach Marty Schottenheimer who was fired by the Chargers after their 2006 season.

The win put the Chiefs 2–2 and tied them with the Denver Broncos and Oakland Raiders for first place in the AFC West. The win was also the 50th win in Herman Edwards' coaching career. Larry Johnson finally managed to get his first 100-yard game of the year with 123 yards on 25 carries.

==== Week 5: vs. Jacksonville Jaguars ====
Week 5: Jacksonville Jaguars at Kansas City Chiefs – Game summary

Quarter	1	2	3	4	Total
**Jaguars**	3	7	0	7	**17**
Chiefs	0	0	0	7	**7**

at Arrowhead Stadium, Kansas City, Missouri

- Date: October 7
- Game time: 12:00 p.m. CDT
- Game weather: Overcast, 78 °F (26 °C)
- Game attendance: 76,917
- Referee: Jeff Triplette
- TV announcers (CBS): Gus Johnson and Steve Tasker
- Recap, Game Book

Game information

**First quarter**

- JAX – John Carney 20-yard field goal, 0:00. Jaguars 3–0. **Drive: 18 plays, 77 yards, 10:55.**

**Second quarter**

- JAX – Maurice Jones-Drew 52-yard run (John Carney kick), 8:36. Jaguars 10–0. **Drive: 6 plays, 80 yards, 3:04.**

**Third quarter**

- No scoring plays.

**Fourth quarter**

- JAX – Dennis Northcutt 3-yard pass from David Garrard (John Carney kick), 8:26. Jaguars 17–0. **Drive: 9 plays, 81 yards, 5:03.**
- KC – Samie Parker 13-yard pass from Brodie Croyle (Dave Rayner kick), 0:00. Jaguars 17–7. **Drive: 11 plays, 70 yards, 1:54.**

**Top passers**

- JAX – David Garrard – 20/27, 218 yards, TD
- KC – Damon Huard – 19/30, 196 yards, INT

**Top rushers**

- JAX – Maurice Jones-Drew – 9 rushes, 82 yards, TD
- KC – Larry Johnson – 9 rushes, 12 yards

**Top receivers**

- JAX – Dennis Northcutt – 4 receptions, 73 yards, TD
- KC – Tony Gonzalez – 8 receptions, 100 yards

Coming off their divisional road win over the Chargers, the Chiefs went home for a Week 5 intra-conference duel with the Jacksonville Jaguars. In the first quarter, Kansas City trailed early as Jaguars kicker John Carney got a 20-yard field goal for the only score of the period. In the second quarter, the Chiefs continued to struggle as Jags RB Maurice Jones-Drew got a 52-yard TD run for the only score of the period. After a scoreless third quarter, Jacksonville sealed the game with QB David Garrard completing a 3-yard TD pass to WR Dennis Northcutt. After that, QB Damon Huard, who struggled all game (19/30 for 196 yards and 1 Interception), was benched for Brodie Croyle. He would help Kansas City avoid a shutout by completing a 13-yard TD pass to WR Samie Parker on the very last offensive play of the game.

With the loss, the Chiefs fell to 2–3. The fourth-quarter touchdown was the first second-half touchdown by any Chiefs opponent since the Texans' touchdown in the third quarter of Week 1. Entering the game, the Chiefs' dominant second-half defense led the league with just an average 1.5 points allowed per game.

==== Week 6: vs. Cincinnati Bengals ====
Week 6: Cincinnati Bengals at Kansas City Chiefs – Game summary

Quarter	1	2	3	4	Total
Bengals	7	0	0	13	**20**
**Chiefs**	10	10	0	7	**27**

at Arrowhead Stadium, Kansas City, Missouri

- Date: October 14
- Game time: 12:00 p.m. CDT
- Game weather: Partly cloudy, 68 °F (20 °C)
- Game attendance: 76,846
- Referee: John Parry
- TV announcers (CBS): Kevin Harlan and Rich Gannon
- Recap, Game Book

Game information

**First quarter**

- KC – Dave Rayner 32-yard field goal, 9:39. Chiefs 3–0. **Drive: 12 plays, 49 yards, 5:21.**
- CIN – T. J. Houshmandzadeh 42-yard pass from Carson Palmer (Shayne Graham kick), 7:39. Bengals 7–3. **Drive: 4 plays, 73 yards, 2:00.**
- KC – Tony Gonzalez 3-yard pass from Damon Huard (Dave Rayner kick), 0:53. Chiefs 10–7. **Drive: 7 plays, 44 yards, 2:06.**

**Second quarter**

- KC – Larry Johnson 8-yard run (Dave Rayner kick), 6:27. Chiefs 17–7. **Drive: 6 plays, 44 yards, 3:30.**
- KC – Dave Rayner 20-yard field goal, 0:00. Chiefs 20–7. **Drive: 10 plays, 58 yards, 1:27.**

**Third quarter**

- No scoring plays.

**Fourth quarter**

- CIN – Shayne Graham 33-yard field goal, 13:54. Chiefs 20–10. **Drive: 8 plays, 37 yards, 2:54.**
- KC – Tony Gonzalez 26-yard pass from Damon Huard (Dave Rayner kick), 8:03. Chiefs 27–10. **Drive: 5 plays, 56 yards, 3:10.**
- CIN – T. J. Houshmandzadeh 30-yard pass from Carson Palmer (Shayne Graham kick), 5:03. Chiefs 27–17. **Drive: 8 plays, 90 yards, 3:00.**
- CIN – Shayne Graham 36-yard field goal, 0:18. Chiefs 27–20. **Drive: 7 plays, 68 yards, 1:35.**

**Top passers**

- CIN – Carson Palmer – 26/43, 320 yards, 2 TD, 2 INT
- KC – Damon Huard – 25/35, 264 yards, 2 TD

**Top rushers**

- CIN – Kenny Watson – 13 rushes, 68 yards
- KC – Larry Johnson – 31 rushes, 119 yards, TD

**Top receivers**

- CIN – T. J. Houshmandzadeh – 8 receptions, 145 yards, 2 TD
- KC – Tony Gonzalez – 9 receptions, 102 yards, 2 TD

Hoping to rebound from their loss to the Jaguars, the Chiefs stayed at home for their Week 6 game against the Cincinnati Bengals. In the first quarter, Kansas City drew first blood with kicker Dave Rayner getting a 32-yard field goal. The Bengals would take the lead with QB Carson Palmer completing a 42-yard TD pass to WR T. J. Houshmandzadeh. Fortunately, the Chiefs retook the lead with QB Damon Huard completing a 3-yard TD pass to TE Tony Gonzalez. With the touchdown, Gonzalez surpassed Shannon Sharpe's record for the most TD catches by a tight end with his 63rd career touchdown reception.

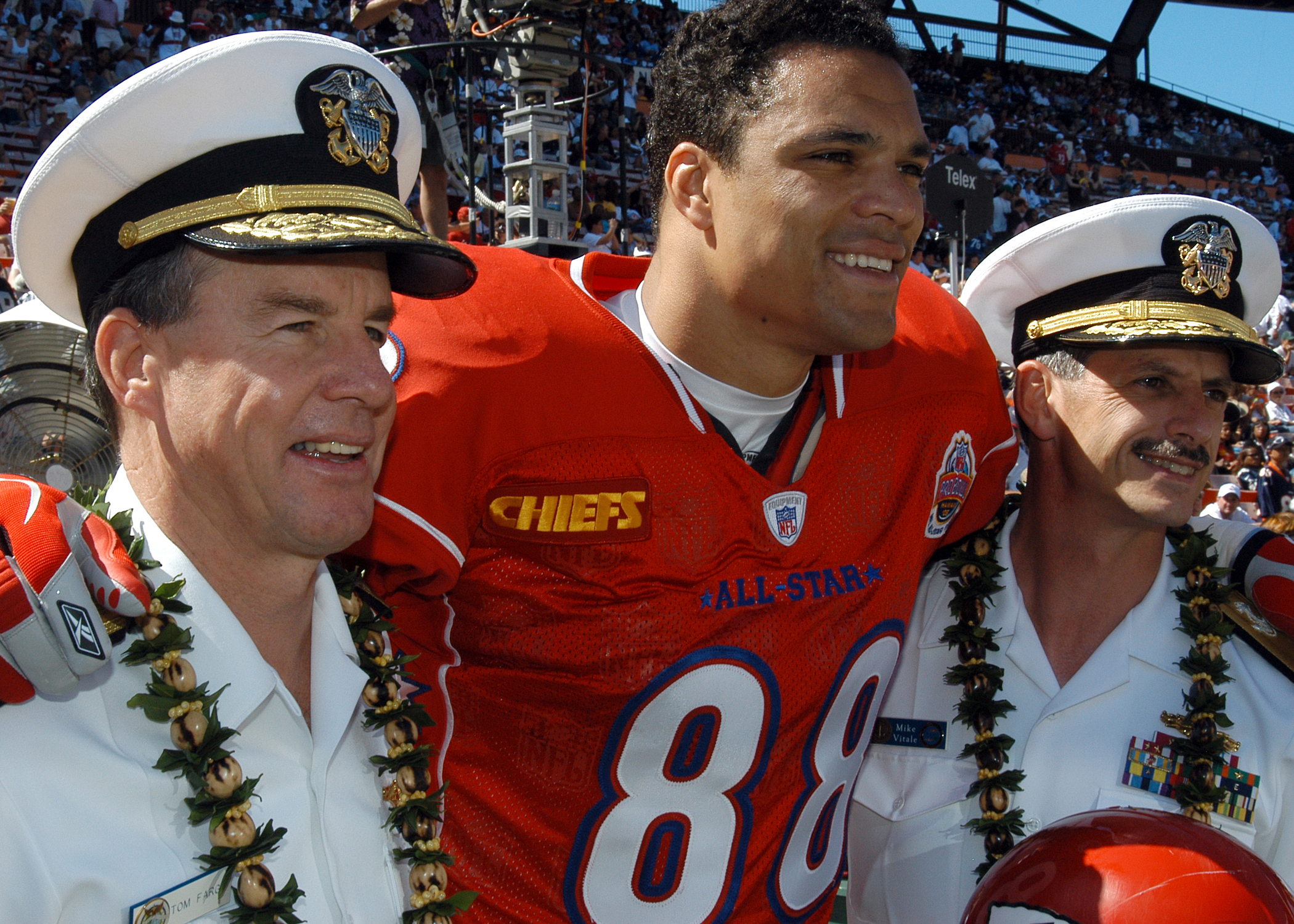
Tony Gonzalez scored his record 63rd career touchdown pass against the Bengals.

In the second quarter, Kansas City increased its lead with RB Larry Johnson getting an 8-yard TD run (which was the first rushing TD by a Chiefs RB this year), along with Rayner ending the half with a 20-yard field goal. At halftime, former Chiefs safety Albert Lewis was inducted into the team's Hall of Fame.

After a scoreless third quarter, Cincinnati began to fight back as kicker Shayne Graham got a 33-yard field goal. After Kansas City increased its lead with Huard hooking up with Gonzalez again on a 26-yard TD pass, the Bengals nearly managed to tie the game with Palmer hooking up with Houshmandzadeh again on a 30-yard TD pass, along with Graham kicking a 36-yard field goal. K.C. managed to recover the onside kick and get the victory.

With the win, the Chiefs improved to 3–3.

==== Week 7: at Oakland Raiders ====
Week 7: Kansas City Chiefs at Oakland Raiders – Game summary

Quarter	1	2	3	4	Total
**Chiefs**	3	3	0	6	**12**
Raiders	0	0	7	3	**10**

at McAfee Coliseum, Oakland, California

- Date: October 21
- Game time: 3:05 p.m. CDT/1:05 p.m. PDT
- Game weather: Sunny skies, 68 °F (20 °C)
- Game attendance: 62,240
- Referee: Bill Leavy
- TV announcers (CBS): Jim Nantz and Phil Simms
- Recap, Game Book

Game information

**First quarter**

- KC – Dave Rayner 41-yard field goal, 10:40. Chiefs 3–0. **Drive: 10 plays, 57 yards, 4:20.**

**Second quarter**

- KC – Dave Rayner 31-yard field goal, 14:01. Chiefs 6–0. **Drive: 6 plays, 16 yards, 2:13.**

**Third quarter**

- OAK – Ronald Curry 21-yard pass from Daunte Culpepper (Sebastian Janikowski kick), 2:37. Raiders 7–6. **Drive: 2 plays, 80 yards, 0:51.**

**Fourth quarter**

- KC – Larry Johnson 1-yard run (pass failed), 11:30. Chiefs 12–7. **Drive: 9 plays, 74 yards, 3:10.**
- OAK – Sebastian Janikowski 37-yard field goal, 5:49. Chiefs 12–10. **Drive: 10 plays, 51 yards, 5:41.**

**Top passers**

- KC – Damon Huard – 16/31, 177 yards, INT
- OAK – Daunte Culpepper – 18/30, 228 yards, TD, INT

**Top rushers**

- KC – Larry Johnson – 24 rushes, 112 yards, TD
- OAK – LaMont Jordan – 11 rushes, 29 yards

**Top receivers**

- KC – Dwayne Bowe – 3 receptions, 84 yards
- OAK – Jerry Porter – 1 reception, 59 yards

Coming off their home win over the Bengals, the Chiefs flew to McAfee Coliseum for a Week 7 AFC West duel with their arch-enemy, the Oakland Raiders. In the first quarter, Kansas City drew first blood with kicker Dave Rayner getting a 41-yard field goal in the first quarter and a 31-yard field goal in the second quarter. In the third quarter, the Raiders took the lead with QB Daunte Culpepper completing a 21-yard TD pass to WR Ronald Curry for the only score of the period. In the fourth quarter, K.C. regained the lead with RB Larry Johnson getting a 1-yard TD pass (with a failed 2-point conversion). Oakland managed to get within striking distance as kicker Sebastian Janikowski got a 37-yard field goal. Afterwards, the Raiders tried to get into position to win the game. Fortunately, Kansas City's defense eliminated any hope that Oakland had of winning.

With the win, not only did the Chiefs improve to 4–3 heading into their bye week, but it also marked their 9th-straight win over their hated rival.

==== Week 9: vs. Green Bay Packers ====
Week 9: Green Bay Packers at Kansas City Chiefs – Game summary

Quarter	1	2	3	4	Total
**Packers**	0	6	7	20	**33**
Chiefs	0	7	0	15	**22**

at Arrowhead Stadium, Kansas City, Missouri

- Date: November 4
- Game time: 12:00 p.m. CST
- Game weather: Clear, 61 °F (16 °C)
- Game attendance: 78,988
- Referee: Walt Anderson
- TV announcers (Fox): Joe Buck, Troy Aikman and Pam Oliver
- Recap, Game Book

Game information

**First quarter**

- No scoring plays.

**Second quarter**

- GB – Mason Crosby 48-yard field goal, 14:52. Packers 3–0. **Drive: 15 plays, 68 yards, 7:13.**
- GB – Mason Crosby 36-yard field goal, 1:19. Packers 6–0. **Drive: 8 plays, 66 yards, 3:57.**
- KC – Larry Johnson 1-yard run (Dave Rayner kick), 0:15. Chiefs 7–6. **Drive: 1 play, 30 yards, 0:10.**

**Third quarter**

- GB – Greg Jennings 13-yard pass from Brett Favre (Mason Crosby kick), 0:11. Packers 13–7. **Drive: 4 plays, 30 yards, 1:52.**

**Fourth quarter**

- KC – Larry Johnson 30-yard pass from Damon Huard (Dave Rayner kick), 11:11. Chiefs 14–13. **Drive: 9 plays, 74 yards, 4:00.**
- GB – Mason Crosby 32-yard field goal, 8:52. Packers 16–14. **Drive: 5 plays, 46 yards, 2:19.**
- KC – Tony Gonzalez 17-yard pass from Damon Huard (Priest Holmes run), 5:18. Chiefs 22–16. **Drive: 6 plays, 82 yards, 3:34.**
- GB – Greg Jennings 60-yard pass from Brett Favre (Mason Crosby kick), 3:05. Packers 23–22. **Drive: 4 plays, 82 yards, 2:13.**
- GB – Mason Crosby 45-yard field goal, 1:40. Packers 26–22. **Drive: 4 plays, 4 yards, 0:19.**
- GB – Charles Woodson 46-yard interception return (Mason Crosby kick), 0:59. Packers 33–22.

**Top passers**

- GB – Brett Favre – 24/34, 360 yards, 2 TD, 2 INT
- KC – Damon Huard – 19/32, 213 yards, 2 TD, 2 INT

**Top rushers**

- GB – Ryan Grant – 19 rushes, 55 yards
- KC – Larry Johnson – 19 rushes, 53 yards, TD

**Top receivers**

- GB – Donald Driver – 5 receptions, 99 yards
- KC – Tony Gonzalez – 10 receptions, 109 yards, TD

Coming off of their bye week, the Chiefs were at home for a Week 9 interconference duel with the Green Bay Packers. After a scoreless first quarter, Kansas City trailed early on in the second quarter with Packers kicker Mason Crosby getting a 48-yard and a 36-yard field goal. Afterwards, the Chiefs took the lead with RB Larry Johnson getting a 1-yard TD run.

In the third quarter, K.C. trailed again as Green Bay QB Brett Favre completed a 13-yard TD pass to WR Greg Jennings for the only score of the period. In the fourth quarter, Kansas City went back into the lead with QB Damon Huard completing a 30-yard TD pass to Johnson, yet the Packers went into the lead again as Crosby kicked a 32-yard field goal. Afterwards, K.C. went back to work as Huard completed a 17-yard TD pass to TE Tony Gonzalez (with RB Priest Holmes getting the 2-point conversion run). Unfortunately, Green Bay would pull away as Favre & Jennings hooked up with each other again on a 60-yard TD pass, along with Crosby nailing a 45-yard field goal, and CB Charles Woodson sealing the win by returning an interception 46 yards for a touchdown.

With the loss, the Chiefs fell to 4–4.

==== Week 10: vs. Denver Broncos ====
Week 10: Denver Broncos at Kansas City Chiefs – Game summary

Quarter	1	2	3	4	Total
**Broncos**	3	3	14	7	**27**
Chiefs	3	5	3	0	**11**

at Arrowhead Stadium, Kansas City, Missouri

- Date: November 11
- Game time: 12:00 p.m. CST
- Game weather: Overcast, 69 °F (21 °C)
- Game attendance: 77,368
- Referee: Tony Corrente
- TV announcers (CBS): Greg Gumbel and Dan Dierdorf
- Recap, Game Book

Game information

**First quarter**

- DEN – Jason Elam 44-yard field goal, 11:12. Broncos 3–0. **Drive: 8 plays, 42 yards, 3:48.**
- KC – Dave Rayner 38-yard field goal, 5:38. Tied 3–3. **Drive: 6 plays, 19 yards, 1:20.**

**Second quarter**

- KC – Punt blocked by Bernard Pollard out of bounds in end zone for a Safety, 14:35. Chiefs 5–3.
- DEN – Jason Elam 50-yard field goal, 9:18. Broncos 6–5. **Drive: 10 plays, 34 yards, 3:40.**
- KC – Dave Rayner 36-yard field goal, 2:40. Chiefs 8–5. **Drive: 11 plays, 57 yards, 6:38.**

**Third quarter**

- DEN – Selvin Young 20-yard run (Jason Elam kick), 13:32. Broncos 13–8. **Drive: 3 plays, 31 yards, 1:07.**
- DEN – Nate Webster 17-yard fumble return (Jason Elam kick), 13:23. Broncos 20–8.
- KC – Dave Rayner 39-yard field goal, 6:55. Broncos 20–11. **Drive: 13 plays, 52 yards, 6:28.**

**Fourth quarter**

- DEN – Daniel Graham 18-yard pass from Jay Cutler (Jason Elam kick), 10:44. Broncos 27–11. **Drive: 6 plays, 57 yards, 3:31.**

**Top passers**

- DEN – Jay Cutler – 17/29, 192 yards, TD, INT
- KC – Brodie Croyle – 17/30, 162 yards, INT

**Top rushers**

- DEN – Selvin Young – 20 rushes, 109 yards, TD
- KC – Priest Holmes – 20 rushes, 65 yards

**Top receivers**

- DEN – Brandon Marshall – 6 receptions, 85 yards
- KC – Dwayne Bowe – 10 receptions, 109 yards

Hoping to rebound from their home loss to the Packers, the Chiefs stayed at home for an AFC West duel with the Denver Broncos. With RB Larry Johnson out with an injury, RB Priest Holmes would be making his first start in more than two seasons.

In the first quarter, Kansas City trailed early as Broncos kicker Jason Elam managed to get a 44-yard field goal. Afterwards, the Chiefs managed to tie the game with kicker Dave Rayner getting a 38-yard field goal. In the second quarter, Kansas City took the lead with Safety Bernard Pollard blocking a punt from deep within Denver territory. The ball would roll the back of the endzone for a safety. However, the Broncos went back into the lead with Elam getting a 50-yard field goal. The Chiefs would take the halftime lead as Rayner kicked a 36-yard field goal.

In the third quarter, K.C. trailed big as Denver RB Selvin Young got a 20-yard TD pass, while LB Nate Webster returned a fumble 17 yards for a touchdown. Even worse, starting-QB Damon Huard would leave the game on that play due to a concussion. Back-up QB Brodie Croyle took over the Chiefs offense for the remainder of the game. Later in the period, K.C. tried to rally as Rayner nailed a 39-yard field goal. Unfortunately, in the fourth quarter, the Broncos sealed the win with QB Jay Cutler completing an 18-yard TD pass to TE Daniel Graham.

With the loss, not only did the Chiefs fall to 4–5, but it ended their 8-game home winning streak against division opponents.

Priest Holmes, in his first start in over two years, ran 20 times for 65 yards, along with catching 2 passes for 14 yards.

==== Week 11: at Indianapolis Colts ====
Week 11: Kansas City Chiefs at Indianapolis Colts – Game summary

Quarter	1	2	3	4	Total
Chiefs	0	3	7	0	**10**
**Colts**	0	3	7	3	**13**

at RCA Dome, Indianapolis, Indiana

- Date: November 18
- Game time: 1:00 p.m. EST/12:00 p.m. CST
- Game weather: None (indoor stadium)
- Game attendance: 57,294
- Referee: Terry McAulay
- TV announcers (CBS): Gus Johnson and Steve Tasker
- Recap, Game Book

Game information

**First quarter**

- No scoring plays.

**Second quarter**

- KC – Dave Rayner 47-yard field goal, 8:55. Chiefs 3–0. **Drive: 4 plays, 8 yards, 2:02.**
- IND – Adam Vinatieri 27-yard field goal, 1:18. Tied 3–3. **Drive: 4 plays, 4 yards, 1:22.**

**Third quarter**

- IND – Joseph Addai 3-yard run (Adam Vinatieri kick), 7:17. Colts 10–3. **Drive: 9 plays, 64 yards, 4:53.**
- KC – Dwayne Bowe 19-yard pass from Brodie Croyle (Dave Rayner kick), 1:22. Tied 10–10. **Drive: 11 plays, 77 yards, 5:35.**

**Fourth quarter**

- IND – Adam Vinatieri 24-yard field goal, 0:03. Colts 13–10. **Drive: 14 plays, 61 yards, 6:56.**

**Top passers**

- KC – Brodie Croyle – 19/27, 169 yards, TD
- IND – Peyton Manning – 16/32, 163 yards, INT

**Top rushers**

- KC – Priest Holmes – 19 rushes, 55 yards
- IND – Joseph Addai – 21 rushes, 72 yards, TD

**Top receivers**

- KC – Dwayne Bowe – 7 receptions, 64 yards, TD
- IND – Reggie Wayne – 4 receptions, 75 yards

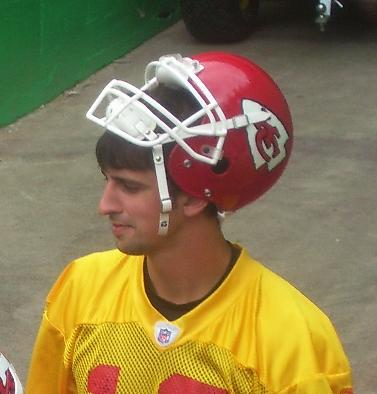
Brodie Croyle made his first career start in Indianapolis.

Trying to snap a two-game losing skid, the Chiefs flew to the RCA Dome for a Week 12 intraconference duel against the defending Super Bowl champion Indianapolis Colts, in a rematch of last year's wildcard battle. This would be the game in which second-year quarterback Brodie Croyle would be given the start.

After a scoreless first quarter, Kansas City struck first with kicker Dave Rayner getting a 47-yard field goal. The Colts would tie the game before halftime as kicker Adam Vinatieri managed to get a 27-yard field goal. In the third quarter, Indianapolis took the lead as RB Joseph Addai got a 3-yard TD run. The Chiefs would respond and tie the game with Croyle completing a 19-yard TD pass to rookie WR Dwayne Bowe. Unfortunately, in the fourth quarter, the Colts sealed the win as Vinatieri nailed the game-winning 24-yard field goal.

With their third-straight loss, the Chiefs fell to 4–6.

The game was also the final outing of Priest Holmes, who suffered a neck injury in the fourth quarter. Holmes announced his retirement later into the week on November 21.

==== Week 12: vs. Oakland Raiders ====
Week 12: Oakland Raiders at Kansas City Chiefs – Game summary

Quarter	1	2	3	4	Total
**Raiders**	3	3	7	7	**20**
Chiefs	7	3	7	0	**17**

at Arrowhead Stadium, Kansas City, Missouri

- Date: November 25
- Game time: 12:00 p.m. CST
- Game weather: Sunny, 43 °F (6 °C)
- Game attendance: 76,210
- Referee: Ron Winter
- TV announcers (CBS): Ian Eagle and Solomon Wilcots
- Recap, Game Book

Game information

**First quarter**

- OAK – Sebastian Janikowski 25-yard field goal, 11:02. Raiders 3–0. **Drive: 5 plays, 19 yards, 2:26.**
- KC – Kolby Smith 10-yard run (Dave Rayner kick), 6:02. Chiefs 7–3. **Drive: 10 plays, 69 yards, 5:00.**

**Second quarter**

- OAK – Sebastian Janikowski 54-yard field goal, 10:39. Chiefs 7–6. **Drive: 6 plays, 11 yards, 2:56.**
- KC – Dave Rayner 30-yard field goal, 5:30. Chiefs 10–6. **Drive: 11 plays, 68 yards, 5:09.**

**Third quarter**

- OAK – LaMont Jordan 5-yard run (Sebastian Janikowski kick), 6:04. Raiders 13–10. **Drive: 8 plays, 65 yards, 3:52.**
- KC – Kolby Smith 5-yard run (Dave Rayner kick), 0:43. Chiefs 17–13. **Drive: 9 plays, 63 yards, 5:21.**

**Fourth quarter**

- OAK – Justin Fargas 14-yard run (Sebastian Janikowski kick), 9:34. Raiders 20–17. **Drive: 3 plays, 77 yards, 1:17.**

**Top passers**

- OAK – Daunte Culpepper – 15/22, 170 yards
- KC – Brodie Croyle – 12/23, 145 yards, INT

**Top rushers**

- OAK – Justin Fargas – 22 rushes, 139 yards, TD
- KC – Kolby Smith – 31 rushes, 150 yards, 2 TD

**Top receivers**

- OAK – Jerry Porter – 3 receptions, 75 yards
- KC – Dwayne Bowe – 4 receptions, 63 yards

Trying to snap a three-game skid, the Chiefs went home for a Week 12 AFC West rematch with the Oakland Raiders. In the first quarter, Kansas City trailed early as Raiders kicker Sebastian Janikowski managed to get a 25-yard field goal. Afterwards, the Chiefs regained the lead as rookie RB Kolby Smith managed to get a 10-yard TD run. In the second quarter, Oakland played catch-up as Janikowski kicked a 54-yard field goal. Kansas City improved its lead before halftime as kicker Dave Rayner nailed a 30-yard field goal.

In the third quarter, the Raiders regained the lead with RB LaMont Jordan getting a 5-yard TD run. The Chiefs would respond with Smith getting a 5-yard TD run. However, in the fourth quarter, Oakland regained the lead with RB Justin Fargas getting a 14-yard TD run. Kansas City tried to come back, but the Raiders held on for the win.

With their fourth-straight loss, not only did the Chiefs fall to 4–7, but it snapped their nine-game winning streak against the Raiders. This would be the first time since 2004 that Kansas City had dropped four-straight games.

Kolby Smith, in his first game starting in absence of Larry Johnson, had 31 carries for 150 yards on the day.

==== Week 13: vs. San Diego Chargers ====
Week 13: San Diego Chargers at Kansas City Chiefs – Game summary

Quarter	1	2	3	4	Total
**Chargers**	3	7	7	7	**24**
Chiefs	3	7	0	0	**10**

at Arrowhead Stadium, Kansas City, Missouri

- Date: December 2
- Game time: 12:00 p.m. CST
- Game weather: Partly cloudy, 34 °F (1 °C)
- Game attendance: 74,874
- Referee: Ed Hochuli
- TV announcers (CBS): Dick Enberg and Randy Cross
- Recap, Game Book

Game information

**First quarter**

- KC – John Carney 38-yard field goal, 10:50. Chiefs 3–0. **Drive: 6 plays, 44 yards, 2:18.**
- SD – Nate Kaeding 25-yard field goal, 5:24. Tied 3–3. **Drive: 9 plays, 63 yards, 5:26.**

**Second quarter**

- KC – Jared Allen 2-yard pass from Damon Huard (John Carney kick), 5:23. Chiefs 10–3. **Drive: 10 plays, 64 yards, 5:53.**
- SD – Vincent Jackson 38-yard pass from Philip Rivers (Nate Kaeding kick), 3:29. Tied 10–10. **Drive: 5 plays, 51 yards, 1:54.**

**Third quarter**

- SD – LaDainian Tomlinson 31-yard run (Nate Kaeding kick), 12:16. Chargers 17–10. **Drive: 4 plays, 58 yards, 1:19.**

**Fourth quarter**

- SD – LaDainian Tomlinson 28-yard run (Nate Kaeding kick), 10:15. Chargers 24–10. **Drive: 6 plays, 80 yards, 2:40.**

**Top passers**

- SD – Philip Rivers – 10/21, 157 yards, TD, INT
- KC – Damon Huard – 19/34, 186 yards, TD, 2 INT

**Top rushers**

- SD – LaDainian Tomlinson – 23 rushes, 177 yards, 2 TD
- KC – Kolby Smith – 21 rushes, 83 yards

**Top receivers**

- SD – Chris Chambers – 2 receptions, 50 yards
- KC – Tony Gonzalez – 10 receptions, 140 yards

Trying to snap a four-game skid, the Chiefs stayed at home for a Week 13 AFC West rematch with the San Diego Chargers. In the first quarter, Kansas City took the early lead with newly acquired kicker John Carney getting a 38-yard field goal. Afterwards, the Chargers got on the board with kicker Nate Kaeding getting a 25-yard field goal. In the second quarter, the Chiefs regained the lead with QB Damon Huard completing a 2-yard TD pass to DE Jared Allen. Afterwards, San Diego tied the game again as QB Philip Rivers completed a 38-yard TD pass to WR Vincent Jackson.

In the second quarter, the Chargers took the lead and the win with RB LaDainian Tomlinson getting a 31-yard TD run in the third quarter and a 28-yard TD run in the fourth quarter.

With their fifth-straight loss, Kansas City fell to 4–8. This also marked the first time since 2001 that the Chiefs have lost four-straight home games.

==== Week 14: at Denver Broncos ====
Week 14: Kansas City Chiefs at Denver Broncos – Game summary

Quarter	1	2	3	4	Total
Chiefs	0	7	0	0	**7**
**Broncos**	14	10	17	0	**41**

at Invesco Field at Mile High, Denver, Colorado

- Date: December 9
- Game time: 3:15 p.m. CST/2:15 p.m. MST
- Game weather: Partly cloudy and hazy, 21 °F (−6 °C)
- Game attendance: 75,895
- Referee: Jeff Triplette
- TV announcers (CBS): Gus Johnson and Steve Tasker
- Recap, Game Book

Game information

**First quarter**

- DEN – Brandon Stokley 21-yard pass from Jay Cutler (Jason Elam kick), 13:20. Broncos 7–0. **Drive: 4 plays, 77 yards, 1:40.**
- DEN – Travis Henry 1-yard run (Jason Elam kick), 7:13. Broncos 14–0. **Drive: 7 plays, 84 yards, 3:51.**

**Second quarter**

- KC – Tony Gonzalez 15-yard pass from Brodie Croyle (John Carney kick), 6:09. Broncos 14–7. **Drive: 15 plays, 63 yards, 8:51.**
- DEN – Brandon Marshall 8-yard pass from Jay Cutler (Jason Elam kick), 1:55. Broncos 21–7. **Drive: 7 plays, 71 yards, 2:14.**
- DEN – Jason Elam 37-yard field goal, 0:00. Broncos 24–7. **Drive: 6 plays, 65 yards, 1:11.**

**Third quarter**

- DEN – Jason Elam 37-yard field goal, 6:58. Broncos 27–7. **Drive: 11 plays, 47 yards, 6:31.**
- DEN – Daniel Graham 2-yard pass from Jay Cutler (Jason Elam kick), 2:14. Broncos 34–7. **Drive: 7 plays, 48 yards, 4:24.**
- DEN – Brandon Marshall 13-yard pass from Jay Cutler (Jason Elam kick), 0:40. Broncos 41–7. **Drive: 3 plays, 17 yards, 0:42.**

**Fourth quarter**

- No scoring plays.

**Top passers**

- KC – Brodie Croyle – 15/29, 132 yards, TD, INT
- DEN – Jay Cutler – 20/27, 244 yards, 4 TD

**Top rushers**

- KC – Kolby Smith – 13 rushes, 12 yards
- DEN – Selvin Young – 17 rushes, 156 yards

**Top receivers**

- KC – Tony Gonzalez – 7 receptions, 76 yards, TD
- DEN – Brandon Marshall – 10 receptions, 115 yards, 2 TD

Trying to snap a five-game skid, the Chiefs flew to INVESCO Field at Mile High for a Week 14 AFC West rematch with the Denver Broncos. In the first quarter, Kansas City trailed early as Broncos QB Jay Cutler completed a 21-yard TD pass to WR Brandon Stokley, along with RB Travis Henry getting a 1-yard TD run. In the second quarter, the Chiefs would get their only score of the game as QB Brodie Croyle completed a 15-yard TD pass to TE Tony Gonzalez.

Afterwards, Denver took over as Cutler completed an 8-yard TD pass to WR Brandon Marshall, while kicker Jason Elam managed to get a 37-yard field goal. In the third quarter, the Broncos sealed the win with Elam nailing another 37-yard field goal, while Cutler completed a 2-yard TD pass to TE Daniel Graham, along with a 13-yard TD pass to Marshall.

With their sixth-straight loss (their longest losing streak since 1987), Kansas City fell to 4–9.

==== Week 15: vs. Tennessee Titans ====
Week 15: Tennessee Titans at Kansas City Chiefs – Game summary

Quarter	1	2	3	4	Total
**Titans**	7	3	10	6	**26**
Chiefs	0	14	3	0	**17**

at Arrowhead Stadium, Kansas City, Missouri

- Date: December 16
- Game time: 12:00 p.m. CST
- Game weather: Clear, 22 °F (−6 °C)
- Game attendance: 74,976
- Referee: Bill Leavy
- TV announcers (CBS): Ian Eagle and Solomon Wilcots
- Recap, Game Book

Game information

**First quarter**

- TEN – Roydell Williams 16-yard pass from Vince Young (Rob Bironas kick), 11:25. Titans 7–0. **Drive: 8 plays, 60 yards, 3:35.**

**Second quarter**

- KC – Samie Parker 10-yard pass from Brodie Croyle (John Carney kick), 12:22. Tied 7–7. **Drive: 12 plays, 53 yards, 5:06.**
- TEN – Rob Bironas 37-yard field goal, 8:31. Titans 10–7. **Drive: 6 plays, 2 yards, 2:17.**
- KC – Kris Wilson 9-yard pass from Brodie Croyle (John Carney kick), 1:47. Chiefs 14–10. **Drive: 14 plays, 60 yards, 6:44.**

**Third quarter**

- TEN – Rob Bironas 37-yard field goal, 11:07. Chiefs 14–13. **Drive: 6 plays, 42 yards, 2:13.**
- KC – John Carney 36-yard field goal, 3:49. Chiefs 17–13. **Drive: 14 plays, 59 yards, 7:18.**
- TEN – Roydell Williams 41-yard pass from Vince Young (Rob Bironas kick), 2:24. Titans 20–17. **Drive: 3 plays, 60 yards, 1:25.**

**Fourth quarter**

- TEN – Rob Bironas 40-yard field goal, 14:56. Titans 23–17. **Drive: 6 plays, 6 yards, 2:14.**
- TEN – Rob Bironas 25-yard field goal, 5:42. Titans 26–17. **Drive: 10 plays, 46 yards, 6:17.**

**Top passers**

- TEN – Vince Young – 16/26, 191 yards, 2 TD
- KC – Brodie Croyle – 25/43, 217 yards, 2 TD, 2 INT

**Top rushers**

- TEN – LenDale White – 23 rushes, 95 yards
- KC – Kolby Smith – 18 rushes, 82 yards

**Top receivers**

- TEN – Roydell Williams – 4 receptions, 94 yards, 2 TD
- KC – Dwayne Bowe – 5 receptions, 64 yards

Trying to snap a six-game slide, the Chiefs went home for a Week 15 intraconference duel with the Tennessee Titans. In the first quarter, Kansas City trailed early as Titans QB Vince Young completed a 16-yard TD pass to WR Roydell Williams for the only score of the period. In the second quarter, the Chiefs tied the game with QB Brodie Croyle completed a 10-yard TD pass to WR Samie Parker. Tennessee would respond with kicker Rob Bironas getting a 37-yard field goal, yet Kansas City regained the lead before halftime as Croyle completed a 9-yard TD pass to FB Kris Wilson.

In the third quarter, the Titans crept close as Bironas kicked a 37-yard field goal, yet the Chiefs answered with kicker John Carney getting a 36-yard field goal. However, Tennessee retook the lead with Young and Williams hooking up with each other again on a 41-yard TD pass. In the fourth quarter, the Titans sealed the win as Bironas nailed a 40-yard and a 25-yard field goal.

With the loss, not only did Kansas City fall to 4–10, but it also marked the first time since 1987 that the Chiefs dropped seven-straight games.

==== Week 16: at Detroit Lions ====
Week 16: Kansas City Chiefs at Detroit Lions – Game summary

Quarter	1	2	3	4	Total
Chiefs	0	14	0	6	**20**
**Lions**	9	10	3	3	**25**

at Ford Field, Detroit, Michigan

- Date: December 23
- Game time: 1:00 p.m. EST/12:00 p.m. CST
- Game weather: None (indoor stadium)
- Game attendance: 59,938
- Referee: Walt Coleman
- TV announcers (CBS): Gus Johnson and Steve Tasker
- Recap, Game Book

Game information

**First quarter**

- DET – T. J. Duckett 11-yard run (Jason Hanson kick), 2:03. Lions 7–0. **Drive: 7 plays, 80 yards, 4:12.**
- DET – Punt blocked by Casey FitzSimmons out of bounds in end zone for a Safety, 0:31. Lions 9–0.

**Second quarter**

- DET – Jason Hanson 46-yard field goal, 10:20. Lions 12–0. **Drive: 11 plays, 47 yards, 5:11.**
- DET – Paris Lenon 61-yard interception return (Jason Hanson kick), 9:00. Lions 19–0.
- KC – Jackie Battle 3-yard run (John Carney kick), 3:33. Lions 19–7. **Drive: 12 plays, 80 yards, 5:27.**
- KC – Jared Allen 1-yard pass from Damon Huard (John Carney kick), 0:23. Lions 19–14. **Drive: 9 plays, 77 yards, 2:11.**

**Third quarter**

- DET – Jason Hanson 20-yard field goal, 8:35. Lions 22–14. **Drive: 7 plays, 74 yards, 4:10.**

**Fourth quarter**

- KC – Dwayne Bowe 34-yard pass from Damon Huard (pass failed), 13:28. Lions 22–20. **Drive: 10 plays, 70 yards, 6:17.**
- DET – Jason Hanson 47-yard field goal, 0:43. Lions 25–20. **Drive: 4 plays, 0 yards, 1:05.**

**Top passers**

- KC – Damon Huard – 24/36, 305 yards, 3 TD
- DET – Jon Kitna – 9/16, 115 yards, INT

**Top rushers**

- KC – Kolby Smith – 17 rushes, 60 yards
- DET – T. J. Duckett – 15 rushes, 102 yards, TD

**Top receivers**

- KC – Tony Gonzalez – 10 receptions, 137 yards
- DET – Calvin Johnson – 2 receptions, 47 yards

Trying to halt a six-game losing streak, the Lions returned home to Ford Field for an interconference matchup with the Kansas City Chiefs, losers of seven games in a row. Detroit got on the board early with an 11-yard TD run from T. J. Duckett and a safety off a blocked Dustin Colquitt punt. In the second quarter, the Lions opened up a 19–0 lead with a Jason Hanson field goal and a Paris Lenon interception return for a touchdown. After the interception, Chiefs quarterback Brodie Croyle tried to stop Lenon in his return, but injured his wrist and sat out the remainder of the game. Damon Huard filled in, and nearly brought Kansas City back with its first win since October. A 3-yard run from RB Jackie Battle and a 1-yard pass from Huard to Jared Allen, whom made his second touchdown catch on offense this season, made the game 19–14. The Lions' Jason Hanson added two more field goals in the second half and the Chiefs could not convert a two-point conversion to Tony Gonzalez in the 3rd after a Dwayne Bowe receiving TD. Detroit held KC off, 25–20, ending their long skid. However, this would be the Lions' last win until week three of the 2009 season.

With their eighth consecutive loss, the Chiefs fell to 4–11, their worst record in 20 years.

==== Week 17: at New York Jets ====
Week 17: Kansas City Chiefs at New York Jets – Game summary

Quarter	1	2	3	4	OT	Total
Chiefs	0	3	0	7	0	**10**
**Jets**	0	10	0	0	3	**13**

at Giants Stadium, East Rutherford, New Jersey

- Date: December 30
- Game time: 4:15 p.m. EST/3:15 p.m. CST
- Game weather: Overcast, 41 °F (5 °C)
- Game attendance: 76,737
- Referee: Larry Nemmers
- TV announcers (CBS): Ian Eagle and Solomon Wilcots
- Recap, Game Book

Game information

**First quarter**

- No scoring plays.

**Second quarter**

- NYJ – Thomas Jones 15-yard pass from Kellen Clemens (Mike Nugent kick), 13:07. Jets 7–0. **Drive: 6 plays, 56 yards, 2:47.**
- KC – John Carney 40-yard field goal, 5:08. Jets 7–3. **Drive: 5 plays, 17 yards, 1:54.**
- NYJ – Mike Nugent 27-yard field goal, 0:13. Jets 10–3. **Drive: 13 plays, 59 yards, 4:55.**

**Third quarter**

- No scoring plays.

**Fourth quarter**

- KC – Jeff Webb 26-yard pass from Brodie Croyle (John Carney kick), 2:59. Tied 10–10. **Drive: 9 plays, 83 yards, 3:58.**

**Overtime**

- NYJ – Mike Nugent 43-yard field goal, 9:47. Jets 13–10. **Drive: 11 plays, 45 yards, 5:13.**

**Top passers**

- KC – Brodie Croyle – 20/43, 195 yards, TD
- NYJ – Kellen Clemens – 13/25, 115 yards, TD

**Top rushers**

- KC – Jackie Battle – 13 rushes, 44 yards
- NYJ – Thomas Jones – 25 rushes, 98 yards

**Top receivers**

- KC – Tony Gonzalez – 7 receptions, 64 yards
- NYJ – Jerricho Cotchery – 8 receptions, 76 yards

Looking to end their season with a win, their first since October 21, the Chiefs played the New York Jets at Giants Stadium. Entering the game, both teams had only seven combined wins. A bigger storyline entering the game was Chiefs head coach Herman Edwards' first visit to the Meadowlands since his departure following the 2005 NFL season. This Chiefs and Jets game was also a "draft position game," with the loser moving ahead of the winner in the top ten of the 2008 NFL draft.

After a scoreless first quarter, the Jets took flight as QB Kellen Clemens completed a 15-yard TD to RB Thomas Jones. The Chiefs would get on the board with kicker John Carney getting a 40-yard field goal, followed by Jets kicker Mike Nugent getting a 27-yard field goal to end the half.

After a scoreless third quarter, Kansas City would tie the game in the fourth quarter with Brodie Croyle completing a 26-yard TD pass to Jeff Webb. In overtime, New York sealed the win and the season with Nugent nailing the game-winning 43-yard field goal. The Chiefs ended their season with their twelfth loss, the franchise's first 4–12 season since 1978.

=== Standings ===
AFC West
	W	L	T	PCT	DIV	CONF	PF	PA	STK
^{(3)} San Diego Chargers	11	5	0	.688	5–1	9–3	412	284	W6
Denver Broncos	7	9	0	.438	3–3	6–6	320	409	W1
Kansas City Chiefs	4	12	0	.250	2–4	3–9	226	335	L9
Oakland Raiders	4	12	0	.250	2–4	4–8	283	398	L4

== Pro Bowl ==
Tight end Tony Gonzalez and defensive end Jared Allen were the only Chiefs players elected to the 2008 Pro Bowl in Honolulu, Hawai'i. Gonzalez will make his ninth consecutive appearance, while Allen will make his first appearance after leading the NFL in quarterback sacks (15.5). It was the fewest Chiefs to be selected to the Pro Bowl since former guard Will Shields was the team's only representative in 1998.

== Season statistics ==
All statistics through the completion of the 2007 NFL season (December 30, 2007).

=== Offense ===
Yards per game: 276.8 (#31 in NFL)

Total yards in season: 4,429 (#31 in NFL)

Points per game: 14.1 (T-#31 in NFL)

Points in season: 226 (#31 in NFL)

Quarterback rating:

- Damon huard – 76.8 in ten games started
- Brodie croyle – 69.9 in six games started

Rushing yards in season: 1248 (#32 in NFL—last place)

Rushing yards per game: 78.0 (#32 in NFL—last place)

Passing yards in season: 3,181 (#20 in NFL)

Passing yards per game: 198.8 (#20 in NFL)

=== Defense ===
Yards allowed per game: 319.4 (T-#13 in NFL)

Rushing yards allowed per game: 130.6 (#28 in NFL)

Passing yards allowed per game: 188.9 (#5 in NFL)

Points allowed in season: 335 (#14 in NFL)

Points allowed per game: 20.9 (#14 in NFL)

Quarterback sacks: DE Jared Allen – 15.5 (#1 in NFL)

Tackles: LB Donnie Edwards – 87 (#7 in NFL)
