= Tyron Brackenridge =

American football player and coach (born 1984)

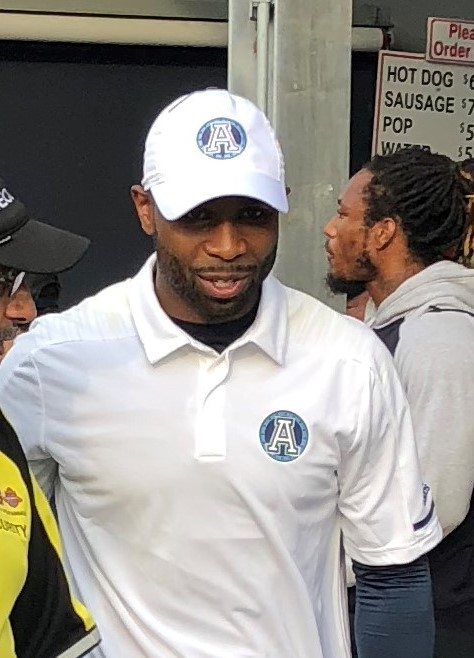
- Brackenridge before a Toronto Argonauts game in 2018

Profile
- Position: Defensive back

Personal information
- Born: June 30, 1984 (age 42); Pasadena, California, U.S.
- Listed height: 5 ft 11 in (1.80 m)
- Listed weight: 189 lb (86 kg)

Career information
- College: Washington State
- NFL draft: 2007: undrafted

Career history

Playing
- Kansas City Chiefs (2007–2008); New York Jets (2009)*; Jacksonville Jaguars (2009–2010); Saskatchewan Roughriders (2011–2015)
- * Offseason or practice squad member only

Coaching
- Toronto Argonauts (2017–?)

Awards and highlights
- 2× Grey Cup champion (2013, 2017); CFL All-Star (2013, 2014); CFL West All-Star (2013, 2014)

Career NFL statistics
- Total tackles: 80
- Forced fumbles: 5
- Fumble recoveries: 2
- Pass deflections: 4
- Defensive touchdowns: 1
- Stats at Pro Football Reference

Career CFL statistics
- Total tackles: 196
- Sacks: 2
- Forced fumbles: 9
- Interceptions: 9
- Stats at CFL.ca (archived)

Tyron Lyle Brackenridge (born June 30, 1984) is an American former professional football player who was a cornerback in the National Football League (NFL) and Canadian Football League (CFL). He was signed by the Kansas City Chiefs as an undrafted free agent in 2007, and won a Grey Cup championship with the Saskatchewan Roughriders in 2013. He played college football for the Washington State Cougars.

Brackenridge was also a member of the New York Jets and Jacksonville Jaguars.

== Professional career ==
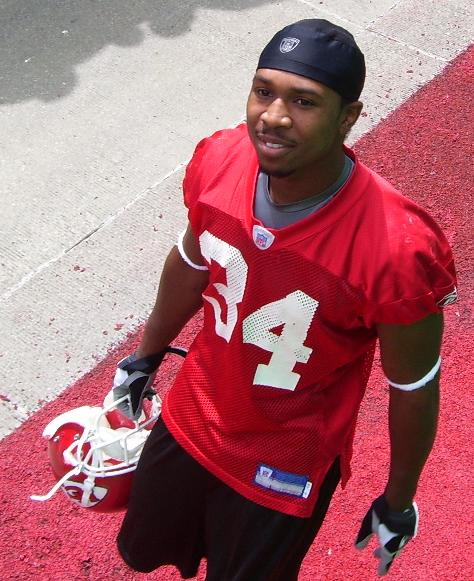
Brackenridge while with Kansas City.

=== Kansas City Chiefs ===
Brackenridge signed a free agent contract with the National Football League's Kansas City Chiefs on May 8, 2007.

In Week 4 of the 2007 season, Brackenridge scored the first touchdown of his career as he returned a fumble.

Brackenridge was released by the Chiefs during final cuts on August 31, 2008. He was re-signed on October 30 after cornerback Dmitri Patterson was released. The Chiefs released Brackenridge again November 5.

=== New York Jets ===
Brackenridge was signed to a contract by the New York Jets on February 19, 2009. He was waived by the team on May 19, 2009.

=== Jacksonville Jaguars ===
Brackenridge was claimed off waivers by the Jacksonville Jaguars on May 20, 2009. Due to injuries to fellow Jaguars cornerback Rashean Mathis, Brackenridge started 5 games in 2009. He made 33 tackles with 5 passes defended in his run as the starting corner opposite Derek Cox. After two seasons in Jacksonville, he was released on July 29, 2011.

=== Saskatchewan Roughriders ===
Tyron Brackenridge signed with the Saskatchewan Roughriders of the Canadian Football League. He saw limited playing time in his first season in the CFL. However, in his second season with the Roughriders, Brackenridge accumulated 77 tackles and 2 interceptions. Following his breakout 2012 CFL season the Roughriders re-signed Brackenridge on February 15, 2013. In 2013, Brackenridge was honoured as the Hardest Hitter in the 2013 CFL season. He was named a CFL All-Star for the first time in his career, finishing the season with 48 tackles, 6 special teams tackles and 3 interceptions. His fourth season in the CFL was again highly productive and he was once again named a CFL All-Star. During the 2014 campaign he amassed 64 tackles, 10 special teams tackles, 3 interceptions and 2 quarterback sacks. About 2 weeks prior to becoming a free-agent Brackenridge and the Roughriders agreed to a contract extension. Tyron was released by the Saskatchewan Roughriders on December 15, 2015.

On April 20, 2016, Brackenridge announced his retirement from professional football.

== Coaching career ==
In 2017, Brackenridge became the Assistant Defensive Backs Coach for the Toronto Argonauts. He was promoted to Defensive Backs Coach for the 2018 season.
