= Bernard Pollard =

American football player (born 1984)

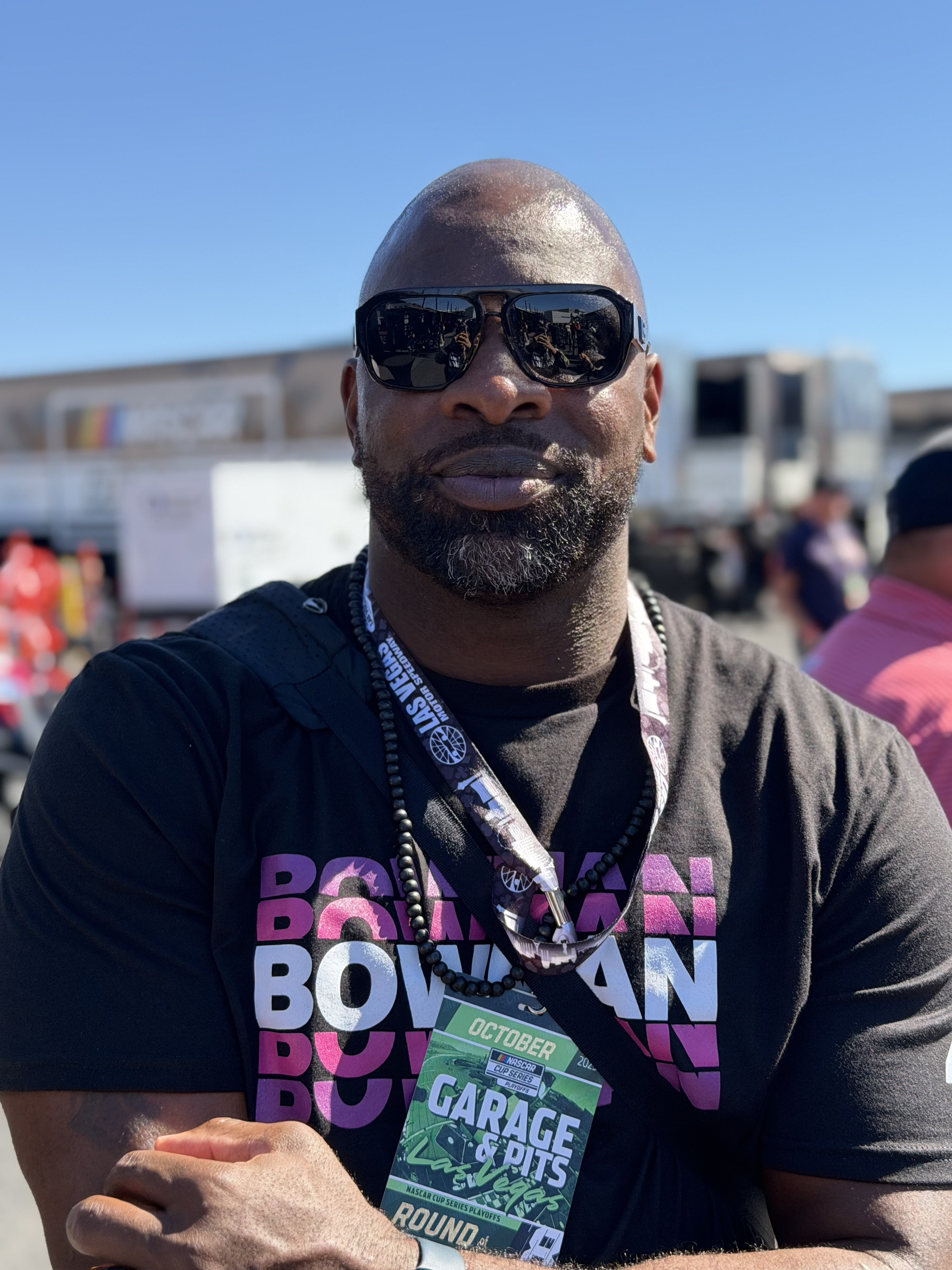
- Pollard in 2025

No. 31, 49
- Position: Safety

Personal information
- Born: December 23, 1984 (age 41); Fort Wayne, Indiana, U.S.
- Listed height: 6 ft 1 in (1.85 m)
- Listed weight: 226 lb (103 kg)

Career information
- High school: South Side (Fort Wayne)
- College: Purdue (2003–2005)
- NFL draft: 2006: 2nd round, 54th overall pick

Career history
- Kansas City Chiefs (2006–2008); Houston Texans (2009–2010); Baltimore Ravens (2011–2012); Tennessee Titans (2013–2014)

Awards and highlights
- Super Bowl champion (XLVII); PFWA All-Rookie Team (2006); Second-team All-Big Ten (2004)

Career NFL statistics
- Total tackles: 711
- Sacks: 10.5
- Forced fumbles: 13
- Interceptions: 12
- Defensive touchdowns: 3
- Stats at Pro Football Reference

Bernard Karmell Pollard (born December 23, 1984) is an American former professional football player who was a safety in the National Football League (NFL). He played college football for the Purdue Boilermakers, and was selected by the Kansas City Chiefs in the second round of the 2006 NFL draft. He has also played for the Houston Texans, Baltimore Ravens, and Tennessee Titans. Pollard was dubbed "the Bonecrusher" while at Purdue for his hard hits and tackles, and acquired the nickname "Patriot-Killer" as a professional, after inflicting injuries which would ultimately alter four New England Patriots seasons, including ending Patriots quarterback Tom Brady's 2008 season.

== Early life ==
Pollard attended South Side High School in Fort Wayne, Indiana, and was a letterman in football, basketball and track & field. In football, as a senior, he was selected as The News-Sentinel Area Player of the Year, and was a first-team All-State honoree. In track, he competed in the long jump (PR of 6.60m) and as a member of the 4 × 100 m (42.83s) relay squad.

== College career ==
Pollard played three years at Purdue University. As a Freshman, he was named a First-team Freshman All-American by Collegefootballnews.com, a second-team by The Sporting News and was selected to the Big Ten All-Freshman team by The Sporting News in 2003. He compiled 66 tackles (42 solo), one pass break-up and one fumble recovery.

In 2004, he was named as a second-team All-Big Ten by coaches and honorable mention by the media. He led the team with 96 tackles (58 solo), 2 forced fumbles, 1 sack, five pass break-ups and one interception He also blocked four kicks (two punts, one extra point and one field goal).

Pollard's final year at Purdue was marred by altercations with coaches, the height of which occurred in the beginning of the season when he asked head coach Joe Tiller to "Give me my papers", indicating the preference to transfer. Tiller did not grant the transfer request, but the incident proved a precursor to a tumultuous final year. Despite this Pollard still compiled 92 tackles (64 solo), 3 interceptions, 3 pass break-ups, 1 fumble recovery and 1 blocked punt. His 5 blocked punts are a Purdue record.

== Professional career ==
Pre-draft measurables
Height	Weight	Arm length	Hand span	40-yard dash	10-yard split	20-yard split	20-yard shuttle	Three-cone drill	Vertical jump	Broad jump	Bench press
6 ft 1 5/8 in (1.87 m)	224 lb (102 kg)	33 1/4 in (0.84 m)	8 1/2 in (0.22 m)	4.59 s	1.58 s	2.67 s	4.11 s	6.88 s	36.5 in (0.93 m)	10 ft 11 in (3.33 m)	18 reps
All values from NFL Combine/Pro Day

=== Kansas City Chiefs ===
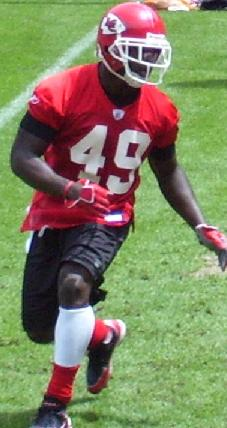
Pollard practicing with the Chiefs in 2007

Pollard was selected in the second round, 54th overall of the 2006 NFL Draft by the Kansas City Chiefs. Pollard played the majority of his rookie season on special teams and ended the year with 10 tackles, 1 pass break-up, 1 forced fumble and 3 blocked punts, one against Arizona, one against San Diego, and one against Jacksonville (recovered in the end zone for a touchdown). Pollard was a starter in the 2007 NFL season. Those three blocked punts rank second in Chiefs history, trailing only Chiefs Hall of Fame CB Albert Lewis (1983–1993) who recorded 10.

Pollard's blocked punt against the Jacksonville Jaguars, he blocked a Chris Hanson punt and recovered for a touchdown, he helped propel the Kansas City Chiefs to a 35–30 win and an eventual playoff berth. He earned AFC Special Teams Player of the Week honors.

He also blocked a punt against the Denver Broncos, in week ten of the 2007 season, that went out of the end zone for a safety. The Chiefs eventually lost, 27 to 11. In the 2007 season, he intercepted his first NFL pass off Carson Palmer against the Cincinnati Bengals on October 14. Pollard also intercepted Jon Kitna in the game against Detroit Lions on December 23.

On September 7, 2008, Pollard was involved in a play that ended with New England Patriots quarterback Tom Brady being taken off the field with a knee injury and not returning for the rest of the game. It was later revealed that Pollard's hit on Brady had ended the quarterback's season. Pollard later apologized for the hit, saying, "It was really an accident, I can't change what happened. I can't do anything but pray for him and hope he has a speedy recovery." The Brady hit, along with other cases where quarterbacks had suffered serious injuries on similar helmet-to-knee hits, resulted in a rules change in the NFL beginning with the 2009 season: a defensive player on the ground may no longer lunge or dive at the quarterback's lower legs.

Pollard was Kansas City's leading tackler with a career-high 98 tackles in 2008 (84 solo) with one for loss, an interception, four passes defensed, two forced fumbles and three fumble recoveries.

On September 5, 2009, the Chiefs released Pollard.

=== Houston Texans ===
Pollard signed with the Houston Texans on September 24, 2009. In his first year with Houston, Pollard had a career year, racking up 102 tackles (81 solo), 1.5 sacks, 4 interceptions, as well as two defensive touchdowns. He had 111 tackles and four forced fumbles the next year.

=== Baltimore Ravens ===
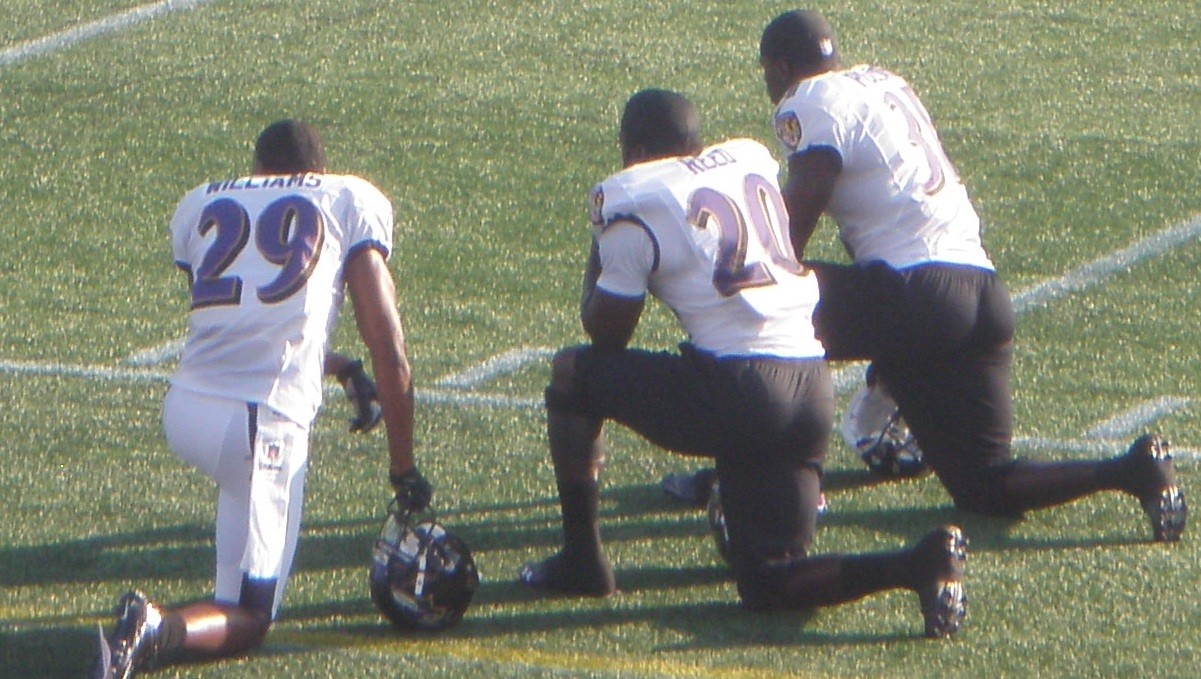
Cary Williams (29), Ed Reed (20) and Pollard (31) at Navy–Marine Corps Memorial Stadium in August 2012

On August 3, 2011, Pollard signed a two-year deal with the Baltimore Ravens, replacing Dawan Landry, who had departed in free agency. While playing on the Ravens defense in 2011, Pollard recorded 75 tackles, two sacks, three forced fumbles, and an interception. On May 8, 2012, the Ravens signed Pollard to a three-year contract extension. On October 26, Pollard was fined $7,875 for an unnecessary roughness penalty in Week 7 against the Houston Texans.

Pollard proved to be more effective and successful for the following season, recording 98 tackles, two sacks and an interception in 13 starts. Despite missing the last three weeks due to a chest injury sustained against the Washington Redskins, Pollard ended the regular season as the team's leading tackler. He would return for the postseason, forcing a key fumble against the New England Patriots in the AFC Championship game and then winning his first Super Bowl ring with the team. He revealed after the season that he had been playing with a rib injury for nearly the entire season, as he sustained the injury during the Week 2 meeting against the Philadelphia Eagles.

In an interview with CBSSports.com's Clark Judge, Pollard claimed that unless significant changes are made, the NFL will cease to exist in 30 years. He said that while the league was making great strides toward making the game safer, players were becoming so big and so strong that concussions and other serious injuries would still continue to escalate. Eventually, Pollard said, "there's going to come a point where fans are going to get fed up with it" and stop watching. On March 13, 2013, Pollard was released by the Ravens.

=== Tennessee Titans ===
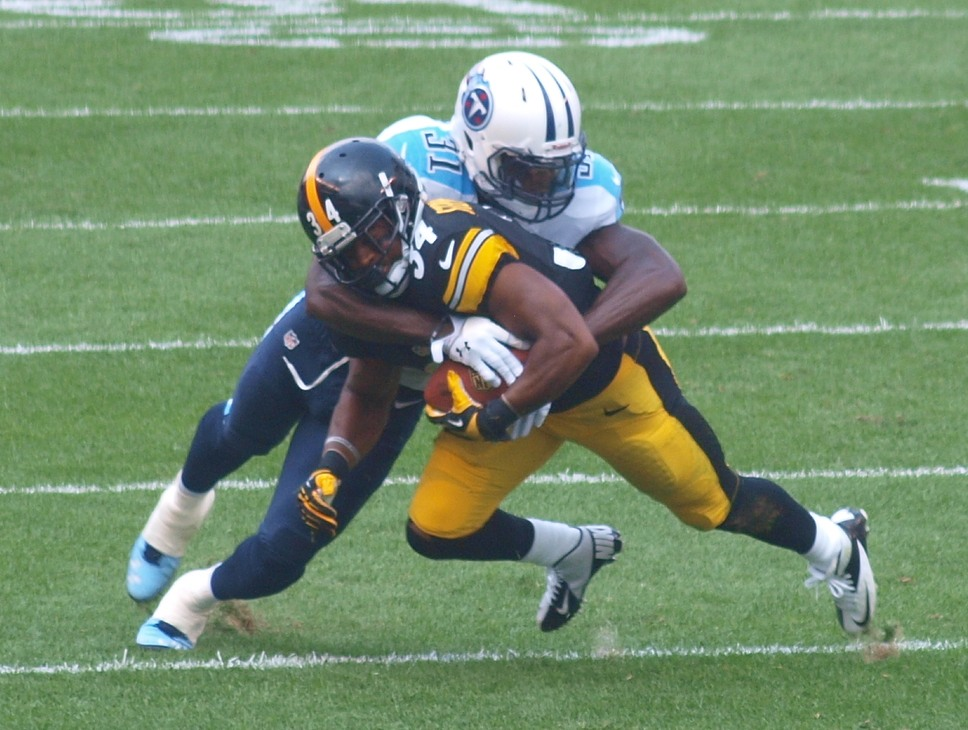
Pollard tackling Steelers running back LaRod Stephens-Howling in 2013.

On March 21, 2013, Pollard signed a one-year deal with the Tennessee Titans. On August 17, 2013, Pollard was fined $10,000 for a late hit on Aldrick Robinson during Preseason Week 2 against the Washington Redskins. On September 18, 2013, Pollard was fined $42,000 for a hit on Andre Johnson that led to Johnson getting a concussion. In 16 games of the 2013 year, Pollard made 99 combined tackles with 0.5 sacks, 3 interceptions, and 5 passes defended.

On March 3, 2014, Pollard and the Titans had agreed on a new two-year contract, keeping him in Tennessee through the 2015 NFL season. During Week 5 against the Cleveland Browns, Pollard suffered an Achilles tendon injury following a Browns' go-ahead touchdown. The next day, an MRI revealed that his Achilles tendon was considered ruptured, prematurely ending his 2014 season. In 5 games, Pollard made 27 tackles with a sack and a pass defended. He was officially placed on injured reserve on October 8.

In the early off-season, Pollard requested a release. On March 3, 2015, Pollard was released by the Titans.

=== "The Patriot Killer" ===
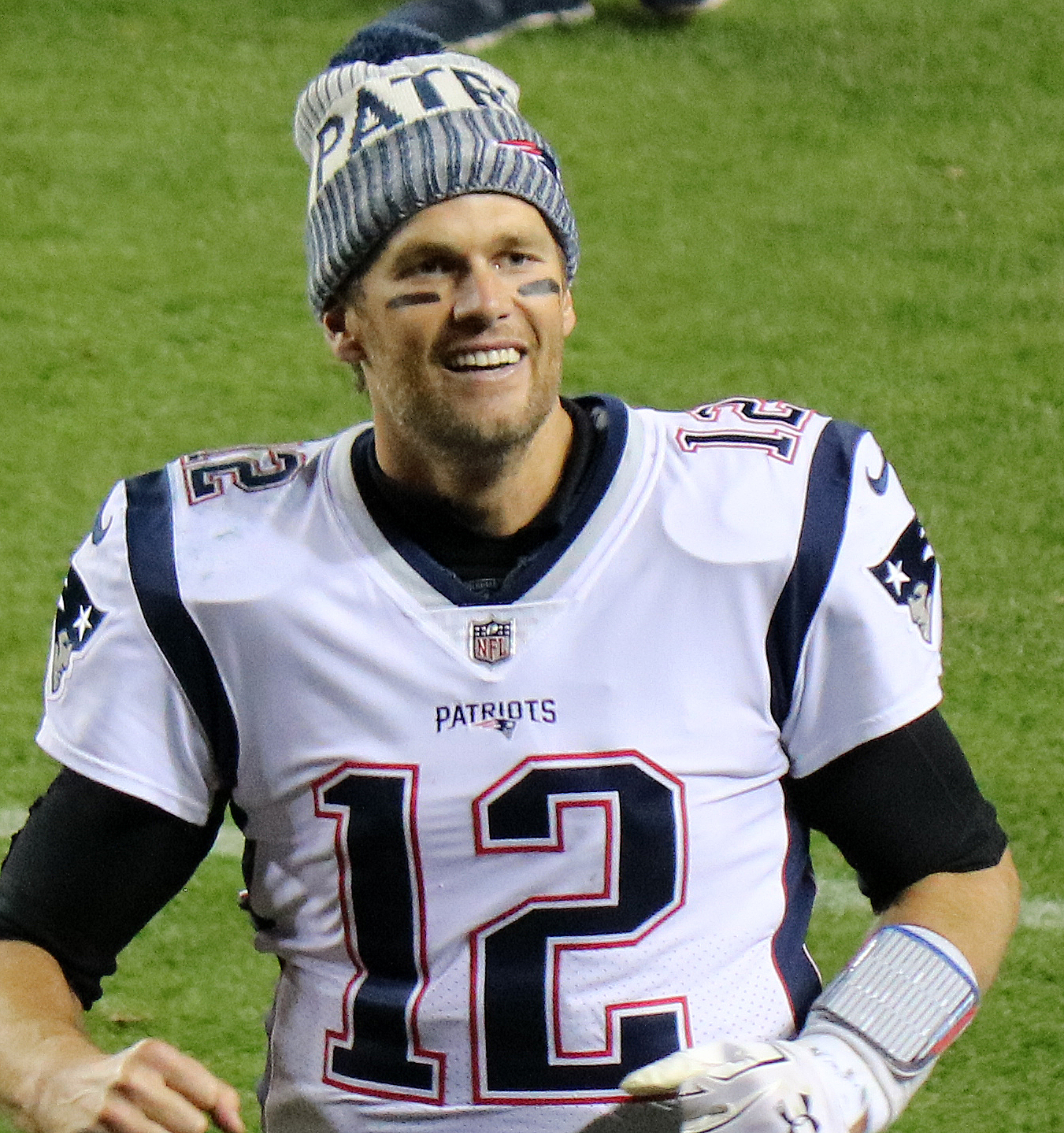
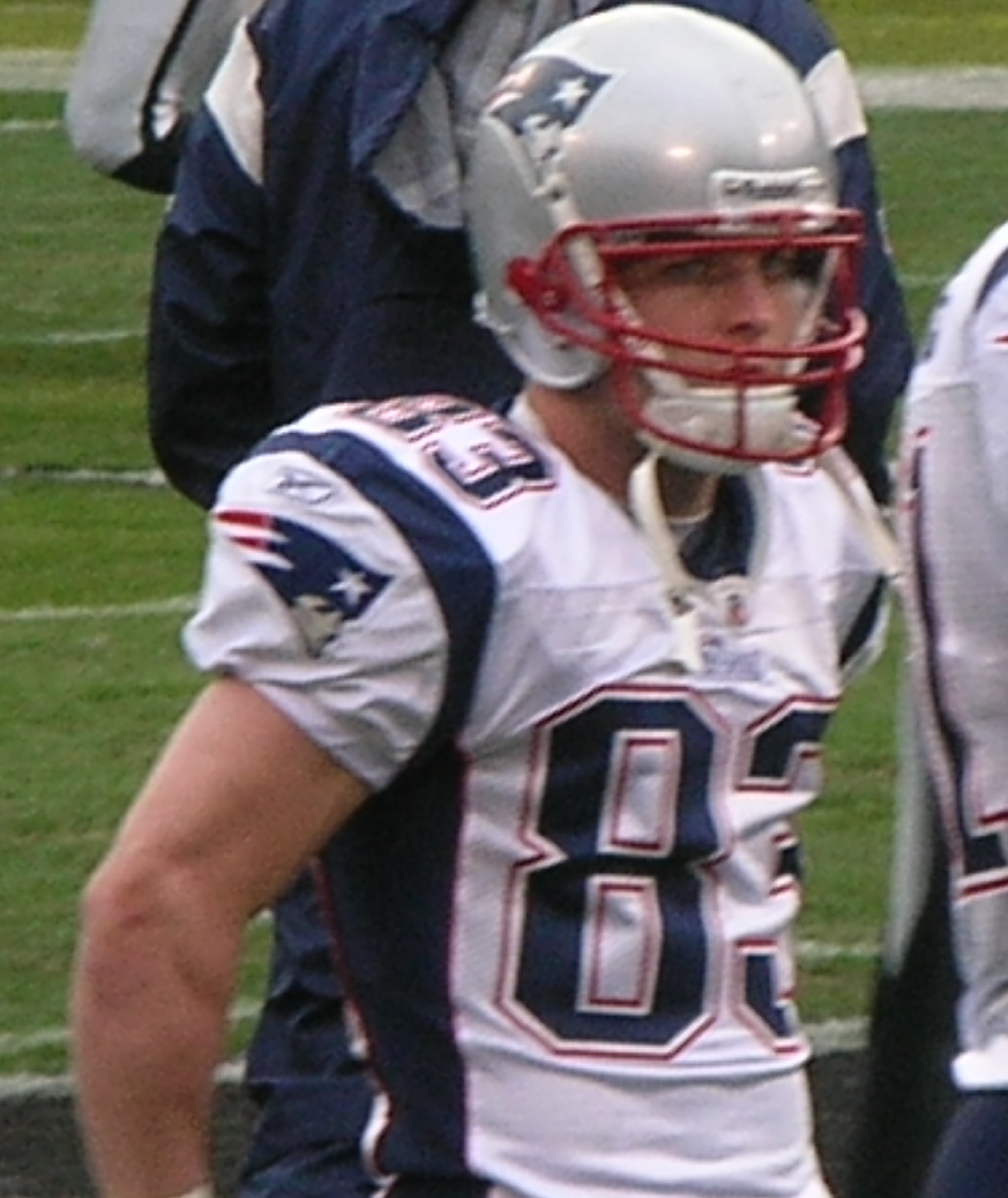
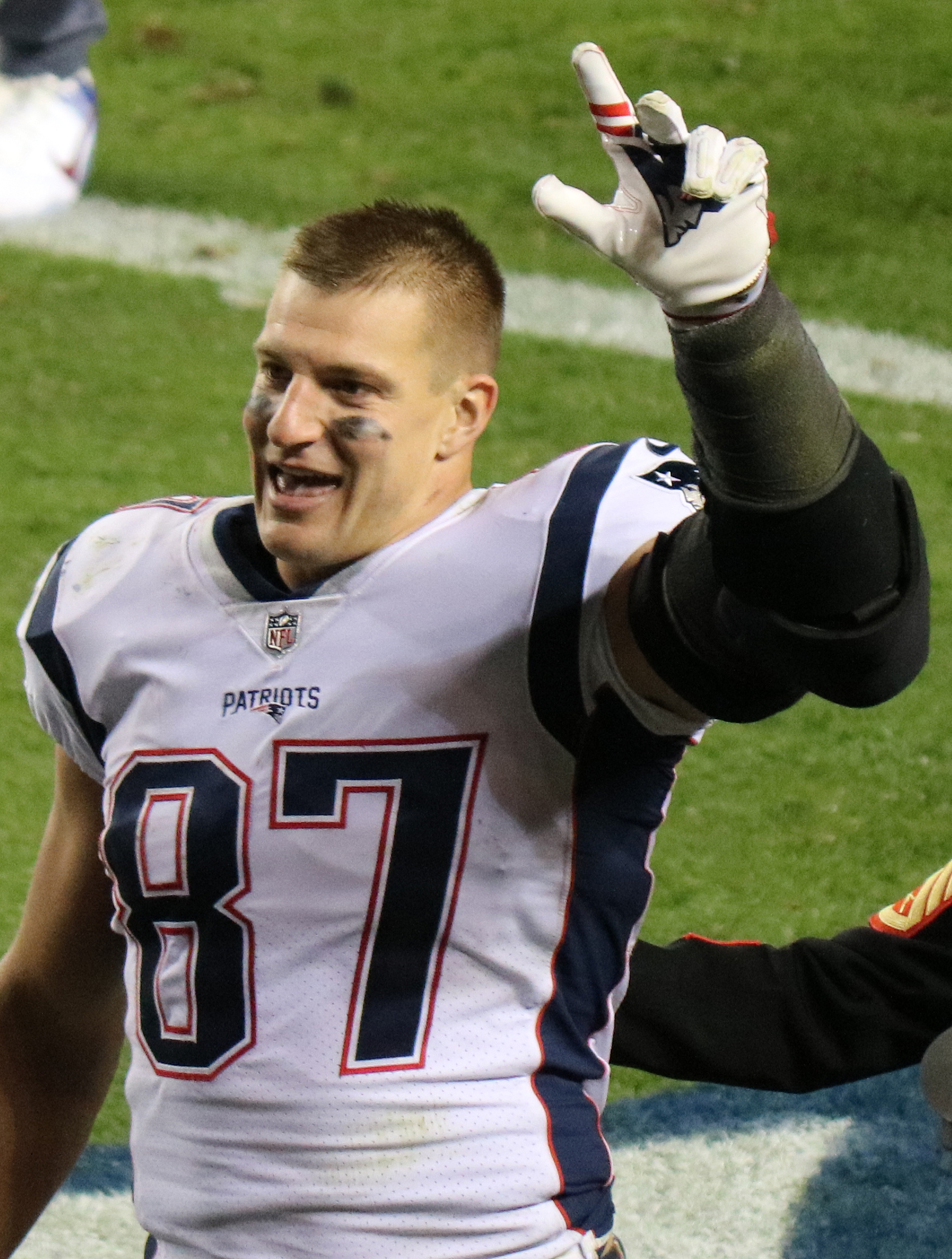
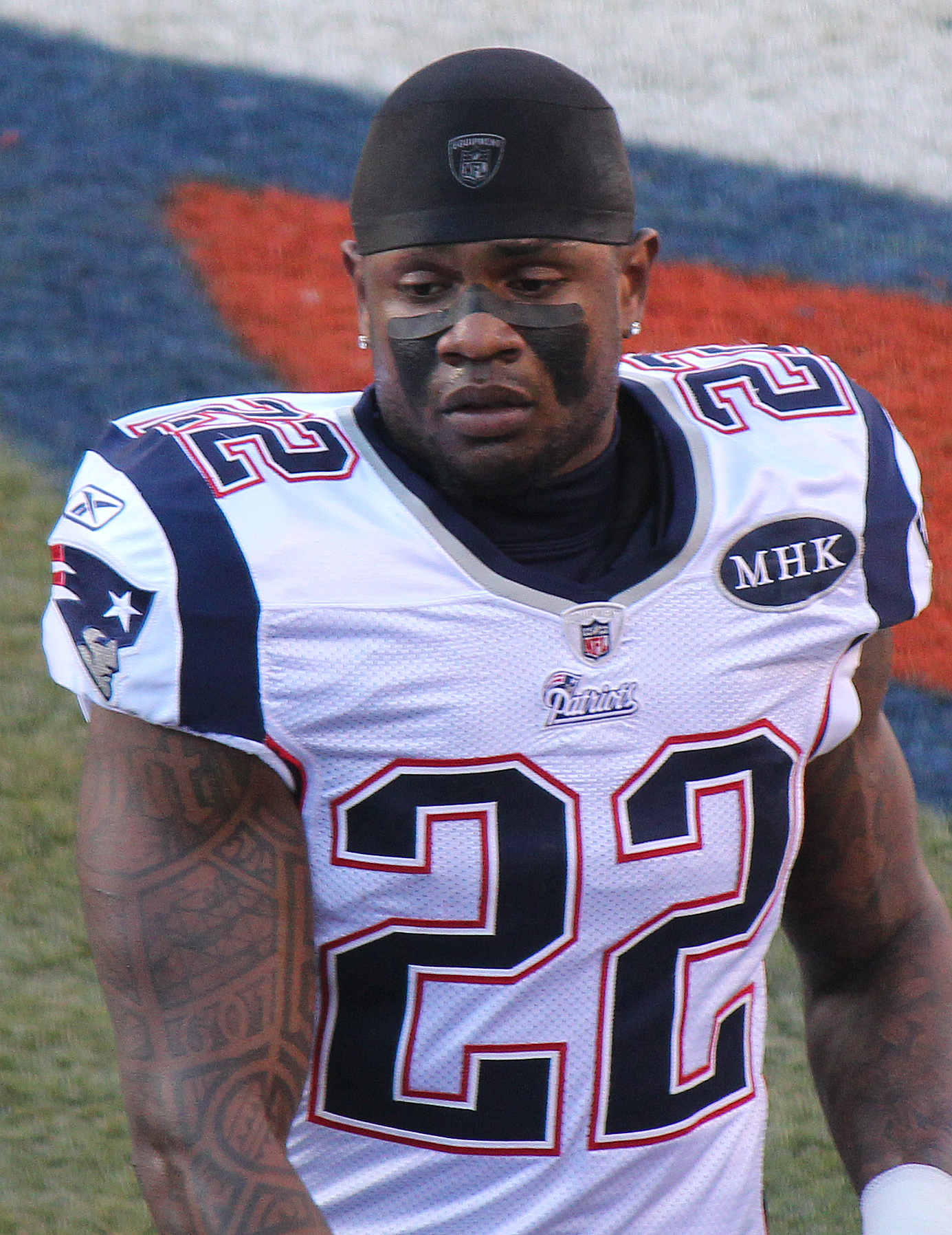
In four different seasons, New England Patriots players (L to R) Tom Brady, Wes Welker, Rob Gronkowski, and Stevan Ridley all suffered injuries of varying degrees by Pollard, significantly altering the Patriots' postseason chances.

Beginning in 2008, while Pollard was with the Kansas City Chiefs, a series of events began to take place that would alter the course of four Patriots' seasons.

During the first week of the 2008 season, Pollard was knocked to the ground while trying to sack Tom Brady. On the ground, Pollard lunged at Brady's legs, connecting his helmet to Brady's left knee and tearing the quarterback's anterior cruciate and medial collateral ligaments. Brady's season was prematurely over, and the season marked only the second time (the other being 2002) in the Brady–Belichick era where the team missed the playoffs.

In 2009, while Pollard was with the Houston Texans, Brady threw a pass to Wes Welker to the short left side of the field, which he then took up the field. Pollard closed in on Welker fast, forcing the diminutive receiver to cut to his right, possibly faster than he anticipated. His left plant foot slipped and he tore his ACL and MCL, missing the playoffs that year.

In the AFC Championship Game following the 2011 season, Patriots tight end Rob Gronkowski caught a pass of about 20 yards with Pollard in coverage. Pollard, now a member of the Baltimore Ravens, wrapped Gronkowski up to take him to the ground. As Gronkowski hit the turf, Pollard's right thigh forcefully landed on Gronkowski's left ankle. Gronkowski suffered a high ankle sprain. Gronkowski played in the Super Bowl two weeks later, but the injury limited him to just two catches for 26 yards.

In the fourth quarter of the 2012 AFC Championship Game, as the Patriots were driving in an attempt to tie the game, Pollard launched a direct helmet-to-helmet hit which concussed running back Stevan Ridley. Ridley immediately lost consciousness and control of the ball, which was scooped up by the Ravens to take over possession, while wide receiver Brandon Lloyd tended to his fallen teammate. This sealed the Ravens' victory, advancing them to Super Bowl XLVII, in which they defeated the San Francisco 49ers. Though Ridley recovered in time to play in the 2013 NFL season, he was unable to retain his job as a starter, and was released by five different NFL teams since 2013.

Pollard was also the final player to tackle Aaron Hernandez in an NFL game.

== NFL career statistics ==
Legend
	Won the Super Bowl
**Bold**	Career high

=== Regular season ===
Year	Team	Games		Tackles					Interceptions						Fumbles		
Year	Team	GP	GS	Cmb	Solo	Ast	Sck	Sfty	Int	Yds	Avg	Lng	TD	PD	FF	FR	TD
2006	KC	**16**	0	11	11	0	0.0	0	0	0	0.0	0	0	1	1	1	0
2007	KC	**16**	15	90	74	16	1.0	**1**	2	23	11.5	21	0	7	1	0	0
2008	KC	**16**	**16**	98	78	20	0.0	0	1	0	0.0	0	0	1	3	**3**	0
2009	HOU	13	13	102	**81**	21	1.5	0	**4**	**121**	**30.3**	**70**	**1**	7	1	**3**	**1**
2010	HOU	15	15	**111**	**81**	**30**	**2.5**	0	0	0	0.0	0	0	5	**4**	0	0
2011	BAL	**16**	13	75	55	20	2.0	0	1	0	0.0	0	0	**13**	3	1	0
2012	BAL	13	13	98	71	27	2.0	0	1	0	0.0	0	0	6	0	0	0
2013	TEN	**16**	**16**	99	77	22	0.5	0	3	36	12.0	32	0	10	0	0	0
2014	TEN	5	5	27	22	5	1.0	0	0	0	0.0	0	0	1	0	0	0
Career		126	106	711	550	161	10.5	1	12	180	15.0	70	1	51	13	8	1

=== Postseason ===
Year	Team	Games		Tackles					Interceptions						Fumbles		
Year	Team	GP	GS	Cmb	Solo	Ast	Sck	Sfty	Int	Yds	Avg	Lng	TD	PD	FF	FR	TD
2006	KC	1	0	0	0	0	0.0	0	0	0	0.0	0	0	0	0	0	0
2011	BAL	2	2	**17**	10	**7**	0.0	0	0	0	0.0	0	0	1	0	0	0
2012	BAL	**4**	**4**	**17**	**11**	6	0.0	0	0	0	0.0	0	0	**4**	**1**	0	0
Career		7	6	34	21	13	0.0	0	0	0	0.0	0	0	5	1	0	0

== Personal life ==
Pollard is married to his wife Meghan with a son Jaylen and daughter Alonna. He established "Pollard's Helping Hands Foundation", which focuses on feeding hungry urban children. He also served as a spokesperson for the annual "Hooked on Books" campaign, sponsored by the Junior League of Kansas City, Missouri.
