= Gilbert Harris =

American football player (born 1984)

No. 30
- Position: Running back

Personal information
- Born: June 18, 1984 (age 42); Brooklyn, New York, U.S.
- Listed height: 6 ft 2 in (1.88 m)
- Listed weight: 235 lb (107 kg)

Career information
- High school: Winston Churchill (San Antonio, Texas)
- College: Arizona
- NFL draft: 2006: undrafted

Career history
- Kansas City Chiefs (2007)

Career NFL statistics
- Rushing attempts: 9
- Rushing yards: 9
- Receptions: 3
- Receiving yards: 38
- Stats at Pro Football Reference

Gilbert Lloyd Harris (born June 18, 1984) is an American former professional football player who was a running back for the Kansas City Chiefs of the National Football League (NFL). He played college football for the Arizona Wildcats. After going undrafted in the 2006 NFL draft, Harris was out of football until he was signed by the Chiefs in 2007.
