= Rob Smith (American football, born 1984) =

American football player (born 1984)

No. 50
- Position: Guard / Center

Personal information
- Born: March 8, 1984 (age 42); Fort Thomas, Kentucky, U.S.
- Listed height: 6 ft 3 in (1.91 m)
- Listed weight: 310 lb (141 kg)

Career information
- High school: Highlands (Fort Thomas)
- College: Tennessee
- NFL draft: 2006: undrafted

Career history
- Cleveland Browns (2006); Kansas City Chiefs (2007–2008)*
- * Offseason or practice squad member only

Career NFL statistics
- Games played: 1
- Games started: 1
- Stats at Pro Football Reference

Rob Smith (born March 8, 1984) is an American former professional football player who was a guard and center in the National Football League (NFL). He was signed by the Cleveland Browns as an undrafted free agent in 2006. He played college football for the Tennessee Volunteers.

He is currently a high school health teacher in Kentucky.

Pre-draft measurables
Height	Weight	40-yard dash	20-yard shuttle	Three-cone drill	Vertical jump	Broad jump	Bench press
6 ft 2 7/8 in (1.90 m)	311 lb (141 kg)	5.31 s	4.93 s	7.62 s	29.0 in (0.74 m)	7 ft 9 in (2.36 m)	27 reps
All values from Pro Day
