= Michael Allan =

American football player (born 1983)

No. 81
- Position: Tight end

Personal information
- Born: September 8, 1983 (age 43); Bellevue, Washington, U.S.
- Listed height: 6 ft 6 in (1.98 m)
- Listed weight: 254 lb (115 kg)

Career information
- College: Whitworth University
- NFL draft: 2007: 7th round, 231st overall pick

Career history
- Kansas City Chiefs (2007); California Redwoods (2009); Seattle Seahawks (2010)*
- * Offseason or practice squad member only

Awards and highlights
- 2× Division III All-American (2006–2007); 3× First-team All-NWC (2005–2007)

Michael Christopher Allan (born September 9, 1983) is an American former professional football player who was a tight end in the National Football League (NFL). He was selected by the Kansas City Chiefs in the seventh round of the 2007 NFL draft. He played college football at Whitworth.

He was also a member of the California Redwoods and Seattle Seahawks.

== Early life ==
Allan first started playing football at Interlake High School located in Bellevue, Washington.

== College career ==
Allan played college football at Whitworth University, a Division III school in the Northwest Conference. He helped lead Whitworth football to their first 10–0 season in 100 years of football, including to the second round of the Division III playoffs.

Allan was invited to play in the 2007 East-West Shrine Game following his senior season. He ended his Whitworth career with school records for individual season touchdown receptions (15), career touchdown receptions (29), and career yards per catch (18.7).

== Professional career ==
=== Pre-draft ===
Allan participated in the 2007 NFL Combine following the 2006 season. He impressed the media at the NFL Combine by posting great marks for tight ends and an impressive interview.

=== Kansas City Chiefs ===
Allan was selected in the seventh round (231st overall) of the 2007 NFL draft. He became the first Whitworth University football player to be drafted into the NFL since Eric Kelley was selected by the Detroit Lions in 1972 NFL draft. Allan also became the first Division III player drafted into the NFL since 2003.

On September 12, 2007, Kansas City Chiefs President Carl Peterson announced that the club has added Allan to its practice squad. He returned to the active roster after agreeing to a three-year contract on December 19, 2007. Michael Allan was cut from the Chiefs on August 31, 2008.

=== California Redwoods ===
Allan was signed by the California Redwoods of the United Football League on August 18, 2009.

=== Seattle Seahawks ===
Allan was signed by the Seattle Seahawks on May 19, 2010. In order for the move to be done, the Seahawks released TE Patrick Devenny. On the same day, the Seahawks also signed QB J.P. Losman Allan was then released by the Seahawks on June 9, 2010. Allan is now a Firefighter in the Seattle area.
