= Dimitri Patterson =

American football player (born 1983)

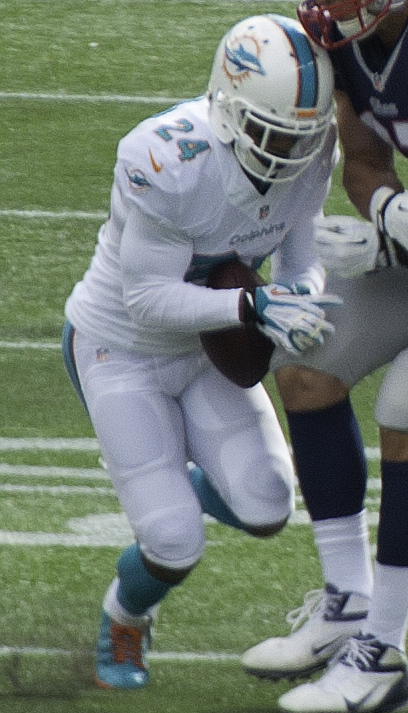
- Patterson with the Miami Dolphins in 2013

No. 34, 22, 23, 21, 32, 24
- Position: Cornerback

Personal information
- Born: June 18, 1983 (age 43); Miami, Florida, U.S.
- Listed height: 5 ft 10 in (1.78 m)
- Listed weight: 200 lb (91 kg)

Career information
- High school: Maynard Evans (Orlando, Florida)
- College: Southeast Missouri State; Tuskegee
- NFL draft: 2005: undrafted

Career history
- Washington Redskins (2005); Minnesota Vikings (2006)*; Kansas City Chiefs (2007–2008); Philadelphia Eagles (2009–2010); Cleveland Browns (2011–2012); Miami Dolphins (2012–2013); New York Jets (2014)*
- * Offseason or practice squad member only

Awards and highlights
- First-team All-SIAC (2004); First-team All-OVC (2003); Second-team All-OVC (2002)

Career NFL statistics
- Total tackles: 176
- Sacks: 2
- Forced fumbles: 1
- Pass deflections: 36
- Interceptions: 9
- Defensive touchdowns: 1
- Stats at Pro Football Reference

Dimitri Jonthiel Patterson (born June 18, 1983) is an American former professional football player who was a cornerback in the National Football League (NFL). He was signed by the Washington Redskins as an undrafted free agent in 2005. He played college football for the Southeast Missouri State Redhawks and Tuskegee Golden Tigers.

Patterson has also played for the Kansas City Chiefs, Philadelphia Eagles, Cleveland Browns, Miami Dolphins, and New York Jets.

== Early life ==
At Evans High School in Orlando, Florida, Patterson was All-State, All-Central Florida, All-Metro, All-Region and All-County, and a Prep Star All American as a defensive back.

== College career ==
=== Southeast Missouri State ===
Patterson started 10 games as a true freshman at Southeast Missouri State University in 2001. He earned second-team All-OVC honors at cornerback in 2002 as a sophomore. In 2003, he led the Ohio Valley Conference in interceptions (six) and pass breakups (12), and also had three forced fumbles. Patterson earned first-team OVC that year, as well as making two NCAA Division I-AA All-American teams (The Sports Network and the Associated Press). He was a 2004 Lindy's preseason All-American Team and a first-team All-SIAC pick. He returned two blocked field goals for touchdowns and one blocked PAT attempt for two points. His team won ten games and lost two and played in the 2004 Pioneer Bowl.

=== Tuskegee ===
In 2004, Patterson transferred to Tuskegee University from Southeast Missouri State.

== Professional career ==
=== Washington Redskins ===
Patterson signed with the Washington Redskins as an undrafted free agent in 2005. He joined their practice squad on September 5, 2005. He was then promoted to the 53 man roster on October 2, 2005, but was released two days later and returned to the practice squad. Patterson split the season on the active roster 8 weeks and on the practice squad 8 weeks. In his first series on defense as a rookie Patterson intercepted a Drew Bledsoe pass intended for Keyshawn Johnson and returned it for 20 yards.

=== Kansas City Chiefs ===
Patterson joined the Kansas City Chiefs in 2007 grading out as their best special team performer. He was released by the team on October 30, 2008.

=== Philadelphia Eagles ===
Patterson was signed by the Philadelphia Eagles on January 7, 2009, after guard Mike McGlynn was placed on injured reserve.

In the 2009 season, Patterson appeared in 10 games as a core special teams player.

In 2010 Patterson had the best season of his career as the teams most productive special teamer through the first 8 weeks leading the Eagles in special team tackles with 10. Patterson was then inserted into the starting lineup against Peyton Manning's Indianapolis Colts at cornerback week 9 replacing Ellis Hobbs. Patterson ended the season with career highs in interceptions(4), pass deflections, (13), Sacks(1), FF(2), TD's(1)

=== Cleveland Browns ===
On August 2, 2011, Patterson signed a one-year 3.6 million dollar contract with the Cleveland Browns. Patterson had success for the Browns in which he played a vital role in Cleveland's secondary being ranked 2nd in the NFL in Pass Defense which prompted the Browns to re-sign him to a multi-year contract. On December 17, 2012, the Cleveland Browns surprisingly released him.

=== Miami Dolphins ===
Patterson was claimed off waivers by the Miami Dolphins on December 18, 2012.

2013 Patterson was hampered by a nagging groin injury all season but still managed to tie for a team high 4 interceptions in only 6 appearances. Patterson later underwent surgery on his groin at the end of the season.

He was released by the Dolphins on the day before free agency began on March 10, 2014.

=== New York Jets ===
Patterson was signed by the New York Jets on April 1, 2014. On August 25, 2014, Patterson was suspended indefinitely by the Jets, after allegedly leaving the team without contacting the organization. Patterson later gave a statement saying the Jets were properly notified by his agent Drew Rosenhaus. He was released on August 30, 2014. Patterson retired in 2014.
