= 2004 Cincinnati Bengals season =

NFL team season

- Owner: Mike Brown
- General manager: Mike Brown
- Head coach: Marvin Lewis
- Home stadium: Paul Brown Stadium

Results
- Record: 8–8
- Division place: 3rd AFC North
- Playoffs: Did not qualify
- All-Pros: OT Willie Anderson (1st team)
- Pro Bowlers: WR Chad Johnson; OT Willie Anderson; RB Rudi Johnson

Uniform
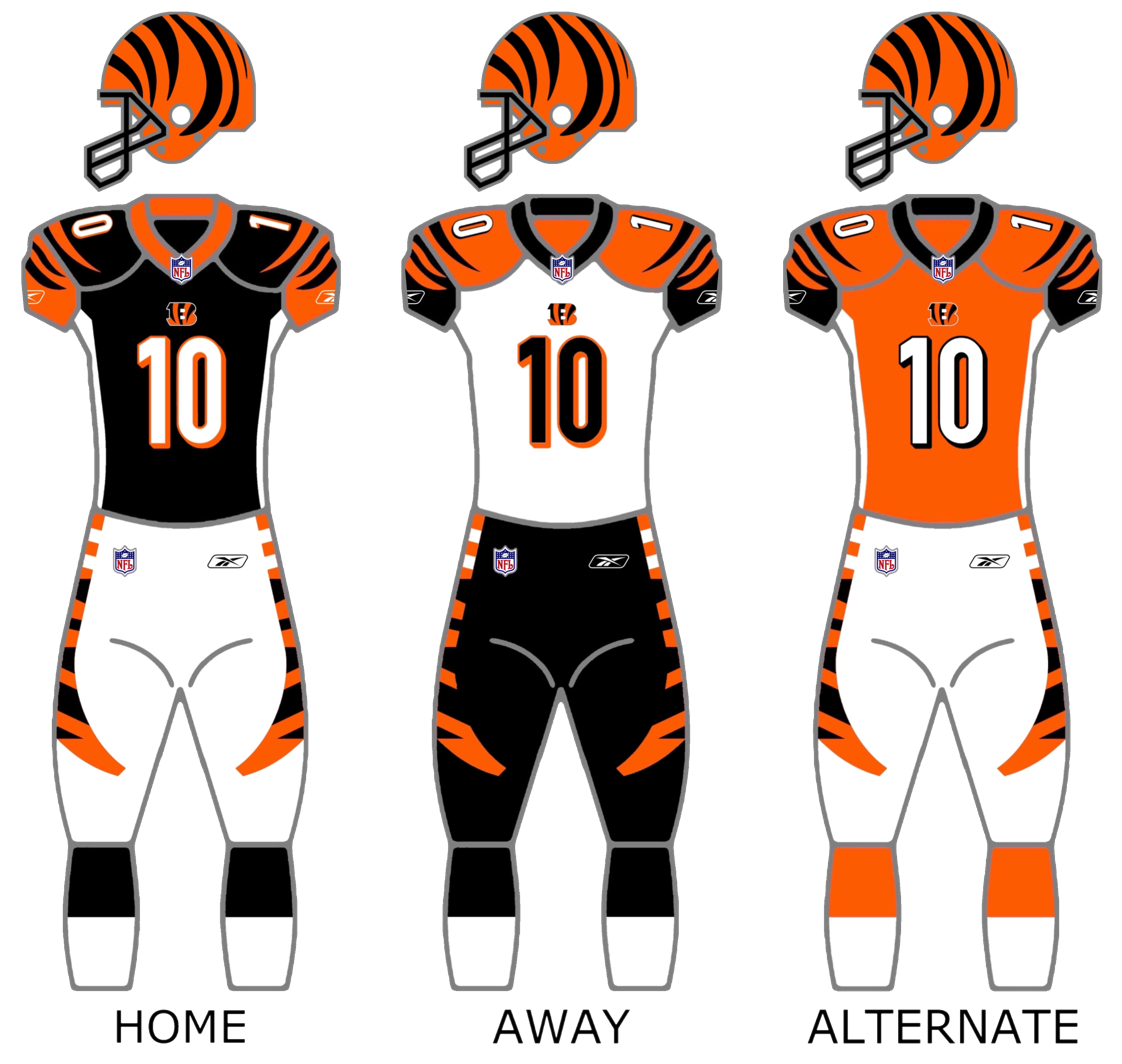

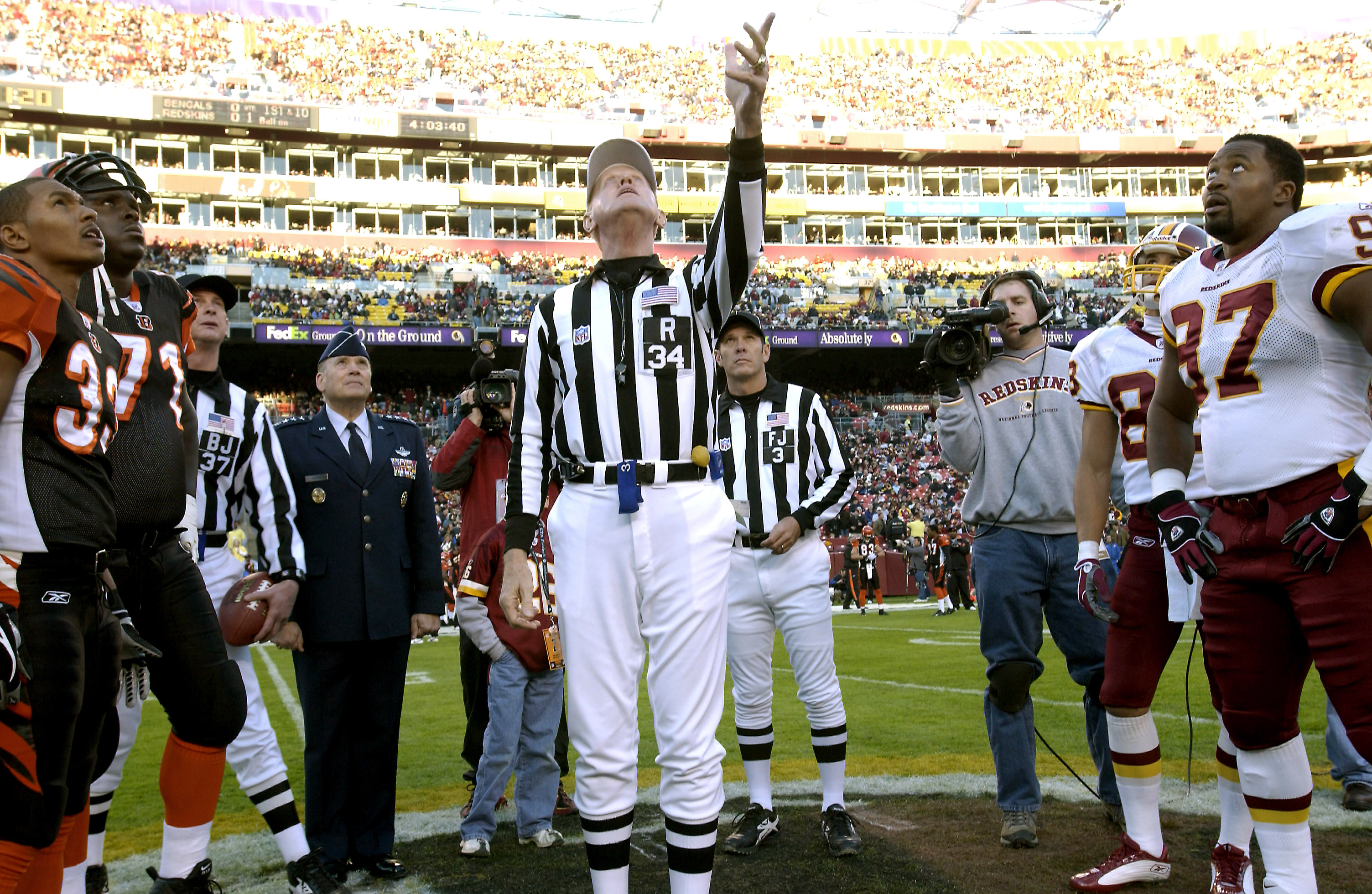
Cincinnati visits Washington in Week 10 of 2004

The 2004 Cincinnati Bengals season was the team's 37th year in professional football and its 35th with the National Football League (NFL). The Bengals began to focus on the future, trading All-Pro running back Corey Dillon to the New England Patriots. That cleared the way for Rudi Johnson to start at running back. Carson Palmer was given the starting quarterback job. He sat out the 2003 season, making 2004 his rookie year. Palmer and the young Bengals would struggle early, losing five of their first seven games. As the season wore on, the Bengals began to hit their stride, as they climbed back to .500, at 6–6, before a sprained knee sent Palmer to the sidelines during a 35–28 road loss to the eventual Super Bowl champion New England Patriots.

With wins in their final two games, the Bengals would finish 8–8 for the second year in a row. Rudi Johnson finished sixth in the NFL in rushing with 1,454 yards, giving Bengals fans hope for the future.

This season would see the Bengals make their first appearance on Monday Night Football since 1992, a win at home against the Denver Broncos on October 25.

== Offseason ==
=== NFL draft ===
2004 Cincinnati Bengals draft
Round	Pick	Player	Position	College	Notes
1	26	Chris Perry	RB	Michigan	
2	49	Keiwan Ratliff	CB	Florida	
2	56	Madieu Williams	S	Maryland	
3	80	Caleb Miller	LB	Arkansas	
3	96	Landon Johnson	LB	Purdue	
4	114	Matthias Askew	DT	Michigan State	
4	117	Robert Geathers	DE	Georgia	
4	123	Stacy Andrews	OT	Ole Miss	
5	149	Maurice Mann	WR	Nevada	
6	183	Greg Brooks	CB	North Texas	
7	218	Casey Bramlet	QB	Wyoming	
Made roster † Pro Football Hall of Fame * Made at least one Pro Bowl during career

== Personnel ==
2004 Cincinnati Bengals staff
Front office: President – Mike Brown; Head coaches: Head coach – Marvin Lewis; Assistant head coach/offensive line – Paul Alexander; Offensive coaches: Offensive coordinator – Bob Bratkowski; Quarterbacks – Ken Zampese; Running backs – Jim Anderson; Wide receivers – Hue Jackson; Tight ends – Jonathan Hayes; Assistant offensive line – Bob Surace	Defensive coaches: Defensive coordinator – Leslie Frazier; Defensive line – Jay Hayes; Linebackers – Ricky Hunley; Defensive backs – Kevin Coyle; Assistant defensive backs – Louie Cioffi; Assistant – Chuck Bresnahan; Special teams coaches: Special teams – Darrin Simmons; Strength and conditioning: Strength and conditioning – Chip Morton; Assistant strength and conditioning – Ray Oliver

== Roster ==
2004 Cincinnati Bengals roster
Quarterbacks (QB): 4 Casey Bramlet; 3 Jon Kitna; 9 Carson Palmer; Running backs (RB): 31 Jeremi Johnson FB; 32 Rudi Johnson; 33 Kenny Watson KR; 35 Quincy Wilson; Wide receivers (WR): 14 Matt Cherry; 84 T. J. Houshmandzadeh; 85 Chad Johnson; 88 Cliff Russell; 83 Kevin Walter; 87 Kelley Washington; Tight ends (TE): 82 Reggie Kelly; 89 Matt Schobel; 86 Tony Stewart	Offensive linemen (OL): 71 Willie Anderson LT; 79 Stacy Andrews RT; 67 Jerry Fontenot C; 76 Levi Jones RT; 75 Scott Kooistra LT; 61 Pete Lougheed RT; 50 Larry Moore C; 65 Eric Steinbach G; 62 Alex Sulfsted G; 63 Bobbie Williams G; Defensive linemen (DL): 92 Duane Clemons DE; 91 Robert Geathers DE/DT; 98 Terrance Martin DT; 72 Carl Powell DE; 93 Greg Scott DE; 90 Justin Smith DE; 99 Shaun Smith DT; 97 John Thornton DT	Linebackers (LB): 51 Kevin Hardy OLB; 59 Landon Johnson MLB; 58 Caleb Miller MLB; 56 Brian Simmons OLB; 95 Larry Stevens OLB; 55 Marcus Wilkins OLB; Defensive backs (DB): 45 Rogers Beckett SS; 22 Kim Herring S; 20 Tory James CB; 34 Kevin Kaesviharn S; 42 Anthony Mitchell FS; 37 Reggie Myles CB; 24 Deltha O'Neal CB; 25 Keiwan Ratliff CB; 30 Terrell Roberts CB; 40 Madieu Williams S; Special teams (ST): 17 Shayne Graham K; 19 Kyle Larson P; 48 Brad St. Louis LS	Practice squad: 57 Allen Augustin LB; 11 Jeremiah Cockheran WR; 70 Derrick Crawford DE; 38 Doug Easlick FB; 49 Ronnie Ghent TE; 81 Freddie Milons WR; 29 Brandon Williams CB; Reserve: 53 Khalid Abdullah LB (IR); 96 Matthias Askew DT (IR); 21 Rashad Bauman CB (IR); 74 Rich Braham C (IR); 27 Greg Brooks CB (IR); -- Frank Chamberlin LB (IR); -- LaDairis Jackson LB (IR); 73 Belton Johnson RT (IR); -- Ricot Joseph S (IR); 60 Langston Moore DT (IR); 26 Chris Perry RB (IR); 10 Kyle Richardson P (IR); 80 Peter Warrick WR (IR); 23 Dennis Weathersby CB (NF-Inj.); 52 Nate Webster OLB (IR); 94 Tony Williams DT (IR); Rookies in italics 53 active, 16 reserve, 7 practice squad

== Regular season ==
The 2004 season constituted the first time since 1991 that the Bengals played the Washington Redskins, and the match produced their first ever away win over that franchise. The reason for this is that before the admission of the Texans in 2002, NFL scheduling formulas for games outside a team’s division were much more influenced by table position during the previous season.

=== Schedule ===
Week	Date	Opponent	Result	Record	Venue	Recap
1	September 12	at New York Jets	**L** 24–31	0–1	Giants Stadium	Recap
2	September 19	Miami Dolphins	**W** 16–13	1–1	Paul Brown Stadium	Recap
3	September 26	**Baltimore Ravens**	**L** 9–23	1–2	Paul Brown Stadium	Recap
4	October 3	at **Pittsburgh Steelers**	**L** 17–28	1–3	Heinz Field	Recap
5	Bye					
6	October 17	at **Cleveland Browns**	**L** 17–34	1–4	Cleveland Browns Stadium	Recap
7	October 25	Denver Broncos	**W** 23–10	2–4	Paul Brown Stadium	Recap
8	October 31	at Tennessee Titans	**L** 20–27	2–5	The Coliseum	Recap
9	November 7	Dallas Cowboys	**W** 26–3	3–5	Paul Brown Stadium	Recap
10	November 14	at Washington Redskins	**W** 17–10	4–5	FedEx Field	Recap
11	November 21	**Pittsburgh Steelers**	**L** 14–19	4–6	Paul Brown Stadium	Recap
12	November 28	**Cleveland Browns**	**W** 58–48	5–6	Paul Brown Stadium	Recap
13	December 5	at **Baltimore Ravens**	**W** 27–26	6–6	M&T Bank Stadium	Recap
14	December 12	at New England Patriots	**L** 28–35	6–7	Gillette Stadium	Recap
15	December 19	Buffalo Bills	**L** 17–33	6–8	Paul Brown Stadium	Recap
16	December 26	New York Giants	**W** 23–22	7–8	Paul Brown Stadium	Recap
17	January 2	at Philadelphia Eagles	**W** 38–10	8–8	Lincoln Financial Field	Recap
Note: Intra-divisional opponents are in **bold** text

=== Season summary ===
==== Week 2 ====
Team	1	2	3	4	Total
Dolphins	0	3	0	10	13
• Bengals	0	0	13	3	16

- Date: September 19
- Location: Paul Brown Stadium
- Game start: 8:30 p.m. EST
- Game attendance: 65,705
- Game weather: 72 °F or 22.2 °C, relative humidity 41%, wind 9 miles per hour (14 km/h; 7.8 kn)
- Referee: Walt Anderson
- TV announcers (ESPN): Pat Summerall, Paul Maguire, Joe Theismann, and Suzy Kolber

Scoring summary
Q2	12:39	MIA	Mare 43 yard field goal	MIA 3–0
Q3	12:01	CIN	Simmons 50 yard interception return (Graham kick)	CIN 7–3
Q3	5:11	CIN	Graham 48 yard field goal	CIN 10–3
Q3	0:13	CIN	Graham 36 yard field goal	CIN 13–3
Q4	3:39	MIA	Chambers 4 yard pass from Feeley (Mare kick)	CIN 13–10
Q4	1:53	MIA	Mare 47 yard field goal	Tie 13–13
Q4	0:02	CIN	Graham 39 yard field goal	CIN 16–13

The win snapped the Bengals' nine-game losing streak against the Dolphins, beating them for the first time since the 1977 season.

=== Standings ===
AFC North
	W	L	T	PCT	DIV	CONF	PF	PA	STK
^{(1)} Pittsburgh Steelers	15	1	0	.938	5–1	11–1	372	251	W14
Baltimore Ravens	9	7	0	.563	3–3	6–6	317	268	W1
Cincinnati Bengals	8	8	0	.500	2–4	4–8	374	372	W2
Cleveland Browns	4	12	0	.250	2–4	3–9	276	390	W1

AFC
#	Team	Division	W	L	T	PCT	DIV	CONF	SOS	SOV	STK
**Division leaders**
1	Pittsburgh Steelers	North	15	1	0	.938	5–1	11–1	.484	.479	W14
2	New England Patriots	East	14	2	0	.875	5–1	10–2	.492	.478	W2
3 (Note: Indianapolis clinched the AFC #3 seed instead of San Diego based upon head-to-head victory.)	Indianapolis Colts	South	12	4	0	.750	5–1	8–4	.500	.458	L1
4	San Diego Chargers	West	12	4	0	.750	5–1	9–3	.477	.411	W1
**Wild cards**
5 (Note: New York Jets clinched the AFC #5 seed instead of Denver based upon better record against common opponents (New York Jets were 5–0 to Denver’s 3–2 against San Diego, Cincinnati, Houston, and Miami).)	New York Jets	East	10	6	0	.625	3–3	7–5	.523	.406	L2
6	Denver Broncos	West	10	6	0	.625	3–3	7–5	.484	.450	W2
**Did not qualify for the postseason**
7 (Note: Jacksonville and Baltimore finished ahead of Buffalo because they each defeated Buffalo head-to-head.) (Note: Jacksonville finished ahead of Baltimore based upon better record against common opponents (Jacksonville were 3–2 against Baltimore’s 2–3 versus Pittsburgh, Indianapolis, Buffalo and Kansas City).)	Jacksonville Jaguars	South	9	7	0	.563	2–4	6–6	.527	.479	W1
8	Baltimore Ravens	North	9	7	0	.563	3–3	6–6	.551	.472	W1
9	Buffalo Bills	East	9	7	0	.563	3–3	5–7	.512	.382	L1
10	Cincinnati Bengals	North	8	8	0	.500	2–4	4–8	.543	.453	W2
11 (Note: Houston finished ahead of Kansas City based upon head-to-head victory.)	Houston Texans	South	7	9	0	.438	4–2	6–6	.504	.402	L1
12	Kansas City Chiefs	West	7	9	0	.438	3–3	6–6	.551	.509	L1
13 (Note: Oakland finished ahead of Tennessee based upon head-to-head victory.)	Oakland Raiders	West	5	11	0	.313	1–5	3–9	.570	.450	L2
14	Tennessee Titans	South	5	11	0	.313	1–5	3–9	.512	.463	W1
15 (Note: Miami finished ahead of Cleveland based upon head-to-head victory.)	Miami Dolphins	East	4	12	0	.250	1–5	2–10	.555	.438	L1
16	Cleveland Browns	North	4	12	0	.250	1–5	3–9	.590	.469	W1
**Tiebreakers** (Note: When breaking ties for three or more teams under the NFL's rules, they are first broken within divisions, then comparing only the highest-ranked remaining team from each division.)

== Team leaders ==
=== Passing ===
Player	Att	Comp	Yds	TD	INT	Rating
Carson Palmer	432	263	2897	18	18	77.3

=== Rushing ===
Player	Att	Yds	YPC	Long	TD
Rudi Johnson	361	1454	4.0	52	12

=== Receiving ===
Player	Rec	Yds	Avg	Long	TD
Chad Johnson	95	1274	13.4	53	9

=== Defensive ===
Player	Tackles	Sacks	INTs	FF	FR
Landon Johnson	133	2.0	0	1	1
Justin Smith	97	8.0	0	2	2
Tory James	74	0.0	8	2	1

=== Kicking and punting ===
Player	FGA	FGM	FG%	XPA	XPM	XP%	Points
Shayne Graham	31	27	87.1%	41	41	100.0%	122

Player	Punts	Yards	Long	Blkd	Avg.
Kyle Larson	83	3499	66	1	42.2

=== Special teams ===
Player	KR	KRYards	KRAvg	KRLong	KRTD	PR	PRYards	PRAvg	PRLong	PRTD
Cliff Russell	39	872	22.4	40	0	0	0	0.0	0	0
Keiwan Ratliff	0	0	0.0	0	0	17	207	12.2	49	0

== Awards and records ==
=== Pro Bowl selections ===
- Rudi Johnson RB, AFC Pro Bowl selection
- Chad Johnson WR, AFC Pro Bowl selection
- Willie Anderson RT, AFC Pro Bowl selection
- Tory James CB, AFC Pro Bowl selection

=== All-Pro selections ===
- Willie Anderson RT, first-team All-Pro

=== Milestones ===
- Rudi Johnson, 1st 1000 yard rushing season (1,454 yards)
- Chad Johnson, 3rd 1000 yard receiving season (1,274 yards)

=== NFL records ===
- 2nd Highest scoring regular season game in NFL history (58–48 win over the Cleveland Browns on November 28, 2004)
