= 2003 Cincinnati Bengals season =

NFL team season

- Head coach: Marvin Lewis
- Home stadium: Paul Brown Stadium

Results
- Record: 8–8
- Division place: 2nd AFC North
- Playoffs: Did not qualify
- All-Pros: WR Chad Johnson (2nd team); OT Willie Anderson (2nd team)
- Pro Bowlers: OT Willie Anderson; WR Chad Johnson

The 2003 Cincinnati Bengals season was the franchise's 34th season in the National Football League (NFL), the 36th overall, and the first under head coach Marvin Lewis, who replaced Dick LeBeau, who was fired following the 2002 season which the worst season in Bengals history. The Bengals had the first overall pick in the 2003 NFL draft with which they selected 2002 Heisman Trophy winner Carson Palmer. After a slow start, the Bengals got hot winning at midseason, winning four straight games to stand at 7–5, entering a key Week 14 matchup with the Baltimore Ravens with a chance to win the division. However, in the key showdown for first place the Bengals showed they were not quite ready for primetime as they were beaten 31–13. The Bengals would rebound to win their next game against the San Francisco 49ers, but at 8–6 the Bengals could not get that ninth win, losing their last two games to spoil an effort to earn their first winning season since 1990, finishing at 8–8.

Along with Willie Anderson, Chad Johnson, for the first time in his career, was named to the Pro Bowl at the end of the season.

== Offseason ==
The Bengals lost fullback Lorenzo Neal and linebacker Takeo Spikes in free agency, while signing cornerback Tory James, safety Rogers Beckett, linebacker Kevin Hardy, defensive tackle John Thornton, tight end Reggie Kelly, quarterback Shane Matthews and defensive ends Duane Clemons and Carl Powell.

Additions	Subtractions
DT John Thornton (Titans)	QB Gus Frerotte (Vikings)
QB Shane Matthews (Redskins)	OLB Takeo Spikes (Bills)
S Rogers Beckett (Chargers)	FB Lorenzo Neal (Chargers)
TE Reggie Kelly (Falcons)	QB Akili Smith (Packers)
LB Kevin Hardy (Cowboys)	K Neil Rackers (Cardinals)
CB Tory James (Raiders)	DE Reinard Wilson (Buccaneers)
DE Duane Clemons (Chiefs)	FB Nick Luchey (Packers)
DE Carl Powell (Redskins)	DE Eric Ogbogu (Cowboys)
	LB Steve Foley (Texans)

=== NFL draft ===
2003 Cincinnati Bengals draft
Round	Pick	Player	Position	College	Notes
1	1	Carson Palmer *	Quarterback	USC	
2	33	Eric Steinbach *	Guard	Iowa	
3	65	Kelley Washington	Wide receiver	Tennessee	
4	98	Dennis Weathersby	Cornerback	Oregon State	
4	118	Jeremi Johnson	Fullback	Western Kentucky	
5	136	Khalid Abdullah	Linebacker	Mars Hill	
6	174	Langston Moore	Defensive tackle	South Carolina	
7	215	Scott Kooistra	Offensive tackle	North Carolina State	
7	259	Elton Patterson	Defensive end	UCF	
Made roster * Made at least one Pro Bowl during career

== Personnel ==
2003 Cincinnati Bengals staff
Front office: President – Mike Brown; Head coaches: Head coach – Marvin Lewis; Assistant head coach/offensive line – Paul Alexander; Offensive coaches: Offensive coordinator – Bob Bratkowski; Quarterbacks – Ken Zampese; Running backs – Jim Anderson; Wide receivers – Alex Wood; Tight ends – Jonathan Hayes; Offensive assistant – Bob Surace	Defensive coaches: Defensive coordinator – Leslie Frazier; Defensive line – Jay Hayes; Linebackers – Ricky Hunley; Defensive backs – Kevin Coyle; Assistant defensive backs – Louie Cioffi; Special teams coaches: Special teams – Darrin Simmons; Strength and conditioning: Strength and conditioning – Chip Morton; Assistant strength and conditioning – Kurtis Shultz

== Roster ==
2003 Cincinnati Bengals roster
Quarterbacks (QB): 3 Jon Kitna; 6 Shane Matthews; 9 Carson Palmer; Running backs (RB): 36 Brandon Bennett KR; 28 Corey Dillon; 37 Jeremi Johnson FB; 32 Rudi Johnson; 33 Kenny Watson KR; Wide receivers (WR): 84 T. J. Houshmandzadeh; 85 Chad Johnson; 83 Kevin Walter; 80 Peter Warrick PR; 87 Kelley Washington; Tight ends (TE): 82 Reggie Kelly; 89 Matt Schobel; 86 Tony Stewart	Offensive linemen (OL): 71 Willie Anderson LT; 74 Rich Braham C; 63 Mike Goff G; 76 Levi Jones RT; 75 Scott Kooistra RT; 77 Victor Leyva G; 79 Scott Rehberg; 65 Eric Steinbach G; 62 Alex Sulfsted; 66 Thatcher Szalay C/G; Defensive linemen (DL): 92 Duane Clemons DE; 99 Oliver Gibson DT; 60 Langston Moore DT; 98 Elton Patterson DE; 91 Carl Powell DE; 90 Justin Smith DE; 70 Glen Steele DT; 97 John Thornton DT; 94 Tony Williams DT	Linebackers (LB): 53 Khalid Abdullah OLB; 59 Frank Chamberlin MLB; 51 Kevin Hardy MLB; 50 Riall Johnson OLB; 56 Brian Simmons OLB; Defensive backs (DB): 45 Rogers Beckett SS; 21 Jeff Burris CB; 27 Artrell Hawkins CB; 26 Tory James CB; 34 Kevin Kaesviharn SS; 44 Marquand Manuel SS; 37 Reggie Myles CB; 30 Terrell Roberts CB; 20 Mark Roman FS; 23 Dennis Weathersby CB; Special teams (ST): 17 Shayne Graham K; 10 Kyle Richardson P; 48 Brad St. Louis LS	Practice squad: 73 Belton Johnson OT; 42 Ricot Joseph S; 35 James Lynch FB; 64 Mike Mabry C; 93 Greg Scott DE; Reserve: 52 Dwayne Levels LB (IR); 72 Matt O'Dwyer G (IR); 57 Adrian Ross OLB (IR); Rookies in italics 53 active, 3 reserve, 5 practice squad

== Regular season ==
=== Schedule ===
Week	Date	Opponent	Result	Record	Venue	Attendance
1	September 7	Denver Broncos	**L** 10–30	0–1	Paul Brown Stadium	63,820
2	September 14	at Oakland Raiders	**L** 20–23	0–2	Network Associates Coliseum	50,135
3	September 21	**Pittsburgh Steelers**	**L** 10–17	0–3	Paul Brown Stadium	64,596
4	September 28	at **Cleveland Browns**	**W** 21–14	1–3	Cleveland Browns Stadium	73,428
5	October 5	at Buffalo Bills	**L** 16–22 (OT)	1–4	Ralph Wilson Stadium	72,615
6	Bye					
7	October 19	**Baltimore Ravens**	**W** 34–26	2–4	Paul Brown Stadium	53,553
8	October 26	Seattle Seahawks	**W** 27–24	3–4	Paul Brown Stadium	52,131
9	November 2	at Arizona Cardinals	**L** 14–17	3–5	Sun Devil Stadium	23,531
10	November 9	Houston Texans	**W** 34–27	4–5	Paul Brown Stadium	50,437
11	November 16	Kansas City Chiefs	**W** 24–19	5–5	Paul Brown Stadium	64,923
12	November 23	at San Diego Chargers	**W** 34–27	6–5	Qualcomm Stadium	52,069
13	November 30	at **Pittsburgh Steelers**	**W** 24–20	7–5	Heinz Field	58,797
14	December 7	at **Baltimore Ravens**	**L** 13–31	7–6	M&T Bank Stadium	69,468
15	December 14	San Francisco 49ers	**W** 41–38	8–6	Paul Brown Stadium	64,666
16	December 21	at St. Louis Rams	**L** 10–27	8–7	Edward Jones Dome	66,061
17	December 28	**Cleveland Browns**	**L** 14–22	8–8	Paul Brown Stadium	65,362

Note: Intra-divisional opponents are in bold text

=== Standings ===
AFC North
	W	L	T	PCT	DIV	CONF	PF	PA	STK
^{(4)} Baltimore Ravens	10	6	0	.625	4–2	7–5	391	281	W2
Cincinnati Bengals	8	8	0	.500	3–3	6–6	346	384	L2
Pittsburgh Steelers	6	10	0	.375	3–3	5–7	300	327	L1
Cleveland Browns	5	11	0	.313	2–4	3–9	254	322	W1

== Team leaders ==
=== Passing ===
Player	Att	Comp	Yds	TD	INT	Rating
Jon Kitna	324	520	3591	26	15	87.4

=== Rushing ===
Player	Att	Yds	YPC	Long	TD
Rudi Johnson	215	957	4.5	54	9

=== Receiving ===
Player	Rec	Yds	Avg	Long	TD
Chad Johnson	90	1355	15.1	82	10

=== Defensive ===
Player	Tackles	Sacks	INTs	FF	FR
Kevin Hardy	124	1.5	0	1	1
Duane Clemons	63	6.0	0	1	1
John Thornton	60	6.0	0	1	2
Tory James	68	1.0	4	0	0

=== Kicking and punting ===
Player	FGA	FGM	FG%	XPA	XPM	XP%	Points
Shayne Graham	25	22	88.0%	40	40	100.0%	106

Player	Punts	Yards	Long	Blkd	Avg.
Kyle Richardson	49	1961	58	0	40.0

=== Special teams ===
Player	KR	KRYards	KRAvg	KRLong	KRTD	PR	PRYards	PRAvg	PRLong	PRTD
Brandon Bennett	53	1146	21.6	46	0	0	0	0.0	0	0
Peter Warrick	0	0	0.0	0	0	25	273	10.9	68	1

== Awards ==
- Jon Kitna QB, NFL Comeback Player of the Year

== Milestones ==
- Chad Johnson 2nd 1000 yard receiving season (1,355 yards)
- Brandon Bennett 2nd 1000-yard return season (1,146 yards)
