= Landon Johnson =

American football player (born 1981)

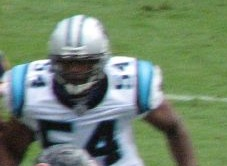
- Johnson with the Carolina Panthers in 2008

No. 59, 54, 55
- Position: Linebacker

Personal information
- Born: March 12, 1981 (age 45); Lubbock, Texas, U.S.
- Listed height: 6 ft 2 in (1.88 m)
- Listed weight: 232 lb (105 kg)

Career information
- High school: Coronado (Lubbock)
- College: Purdue
- NFL draft: 2004: 3rd round, 96th overall pick

Career history
- Cincinnati Bengals (2004–2007); Carolina Panthers (2008–2009); Detroit Lions (2010)

Career NFL statistics
- Total tackles: 482
- Sacks: 3.5
- Forced fumbles: 9
- Fumble recoveries: 4
- Interceptions: 1
- Defensive touchdowns: 1
- Stats at Pro Football Reference

Landon Tremone Johnson (born March 13, 1981) is an American former professional football player who was a linebacker in the National Football League (NFL). He was selected by the Cincinnati Bengals in the third round of the 2004 NFL draft. He played college football for the Purdue Boilermakers.

Johnson also played for the Carolina Panthers and Detroit Lions.

== Early life ==
Johnson attended Coronado High School in Lubbock, Texas and was a three-time All-District pick, a three time All-City pick, a two time All-League pick, and as a senior, he was the District Defensive M.V.P. Furthermore, he holds the school career record for tackles (401 ), and he was also an excellent student who graduated with a 4.0 grade point average.

== College career ==
Johnson played collegiately at Purdue University in West Lafayette, Indiana. He played in 47 games during his career, starting 45 including 10 as a Defensive End. He recorded 345 tackles (222 individual) and 8½ sacks. He was named Honorable Mention All-Big Ten Conference in both 2002 and 2003, and was named Academic All-Big Ten team for all four years. He graduated in May 2003 with a degree in General Health Science.

== Professional career ==
=== Cincinnati Bengals ===
After being drafted 96th overall in the third round of the 2004 NFL draft, Johnson contributed immediately with 11 starts at linebacker while playing in all 16 games. He ended the season as the team's leader with 133 tackles, 92 of which came in the last seven games (over 13 per game). He became the third Bengals rookie to earn the tackling title, joining Takeo Spikes and James Francis. He also had six pass deflections, two sacks, a forced fumble and fumble recovery, and nine special teams tackles. His pass break-ups total was tied for the team-high for linebackers. On November 21, against the Pittsburgh Steelers, Johnson totaled 20 tackles, which was the most in the season for a player and the most for a player in the Marvin Lewis-era of coaching in Cincinnati.

In his sophomore season in the league, 2005, Johnson totaled 87 total tackles on the season while playing all games on the year. Against the Baltimore Ravens, Johnson recorded five tackles and forced a fumble on tight end Todd Heap, which led to a Bengals' touchdown to put the team up 14–3 in the second quarter. In a December victory over the Pittsburgh Steelers, Johnson totaled 11 tackles and forced another fumble. In a December 24 contest with the Buffalo Bills, Johnson set a team-high for the season with 14 tackles.

In 2006, Johnson totaled 113 tackles on the year and also recorded his first career interception. He began the season with 8 tackles in the season opener against the Kansas City Chiefs. The next game, he totaled five tackles and a fourth quarter interception against the Cleveland Browns, which was his first career interception ever. The following game, Johnson totaled a team-high 12 tackles against the Pittsburgh Steelers. He then had eight tackles in consecutive games: New England and Tampa Bay. He then led the team with 11 tackles against the Baltimore Ravens, followed by a team-high 8 tackles and a forced fumble on Lorenzo Neal against the San Diego Chargers. He then finished up against the New Orleans Saints with 14 tackles, a career-high. In the following shutout against the Browns, Johnson recorded five tackles and a sack that also resulted in a fumble. In the next game against the Ravens, Johnson recorded a team-high 13 tackles. In the December contest against the Indianapolis Colts, Johnson recorded 10 tackles, which was his fifth double-digit tackle game of the season. On the December 31 game against the Steelers, Johnson recorded six tackles and a pass deflection, and also forced a Willie Parker fumble on the one yard-line to stop the Steelers' score in the fourth quarter.

The following season, 2007, Johnson won his third-team tackling title with his career-high 143 tackles. His tackle total was 32 tackles ahead of the closest player, linebacker Dhani Jones. He finished the season leading the team in tackles in five games, while finishing second in another five games and was tied for the team lead with two fumble recoveries. He also had five pass deflections, fourth on the team. Johnson began the first eight games of the season at outside linebacker, but finished the second half of the season at middle linebacker due to other injuries on the team. Johnson began the season with 8 tackles against the Browns and then 7 against the Seahawks. Then against the Kansas City Chiefs, Johnson led the team with 10 tackles and also had a sack of Damon Huard. He was then second with 10 tackles against the Buffalo Bills, then led the team with 11 tackles against the Ravens. After missing most of the Tennessee game due to an injury, Johnson bounced back with consecutive 9-tackle games against the Steelers then the St. Louis Rams. He also had a third down stop for no gain on Rams' running back Steven Jackson. In the December victory over Cleveland, Johnson had a tackle on running back Jamal Lewis for no gain on a fourth down situation to add to his total of seven tackles. In the season finale against the Miami Dolphins, Johnson led the team with 11 tackles.

Johnson became an unrestricted free agent in the 2008 offseason.

=== Carolina Panthers ===
On March 7, 2008, Johnson signed a three-year contract with the Carolina Panthers.

He got injured in the 2008–2009 divisional game against Arizona after taking a big hit to the helmet from teammate Jon Beason, after Beason missed a tackle on Cardinals running back J. J. Arrington.

=== Detroit Lions ===
Johnson signed with the Detroit Lions on March 19, 2010.

=== NFL statistics ===
Year	Team	GP	COMB	TOTAL	AST	SACK	FF	FR	FR YDS	INT	IR YDS	AVG IR	LNG	TD	PD
2004	CIN	16	87	60	27	2.0	2	1	0	0	0	0	0	0	2
2005	CIN	16	86	60	26	0.0	1	0	0	0	0	0	0	0	2
2006	CIN	16	114	80	34	0.5	3	0	0	1	2	2	2	0	5
2007	CIN	16	109	71	38	1.0	0	2	0	0	0	0	0	0	4
2008	CAR	15	16	14	2	0.0	2	0	0	0	0	0	0	0	0
2009	CAR	10	20	16	4	0.0	0	0	0	0	0	0	0	0	0
2010	DET	12	48	40	8	0.0	3	1	0	0	0	0	0	0	0
Career		101	480	341	139	3.5	11	4	0	1	2	2	2	0	13
