= Shayne Graham =

American football player and coach (born 1977)

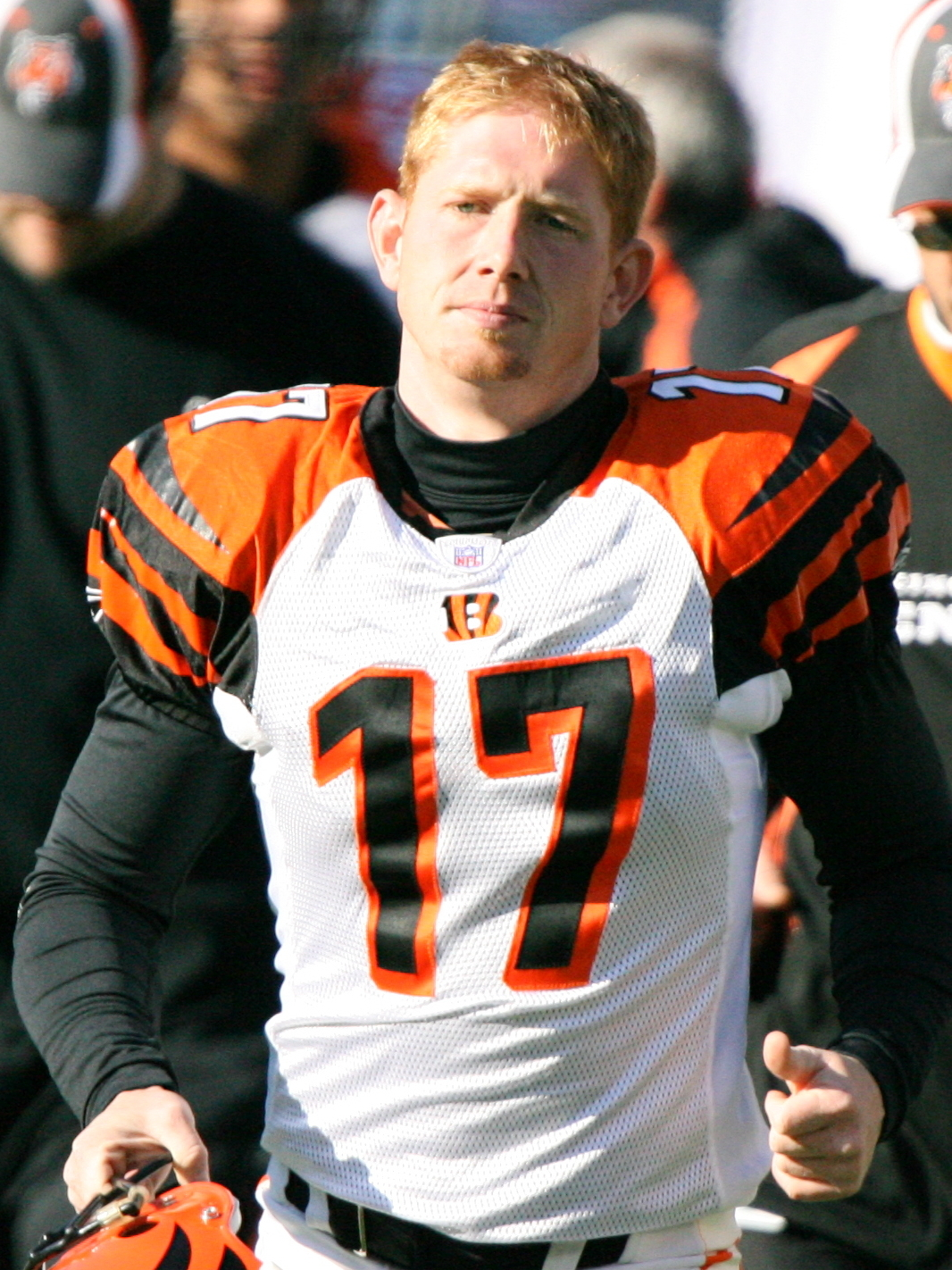
- Graham with the Cincinnati Bengals in 2006

No. 17, 11, 5, 16, 12, 7, 3, 6
- Position: Placekicker

Personal information
- Born: December 9, 1977 (age 48); Radford, Virginia, U.S.
- Listed height: 6 ft 0 in (1.83 m)
- Listed weight: 210 lb (95 kg)

Career information
- High school: Pulaski County (Dublin, Virginia)
- College: Virginia Tech (1996–1999)
- NFL draft: 2000: undrafted

Career history

Playing
- Richmond Speed (2000); New Orleans Saints (2000)*; Seattle Seahawks (2001)*; Buffalo Bills (2001); Seattle Seahawks (2002)*; Carolina Panthers (2002); Cincinnati Bengals (2003–2009); Baltimore Ravens (2010)*; New York Giants (2010); New England Patriots (2010); Washington Redskins (2011)*; Dallas Cowboys (2011)*; Miami Dolphins (2011); Baltimore Ravens (2011); Houston Texans (2012); Cleveland Browns (2013)*; Pittsburgh Steelers (2013); New Orleans Saints (2013–2014); Atlanta Falcons (2015)
- * Offseason or practice squad member only

Coaching
- Central Michigan (2017) Special teams coordinator; Michigan State (2018–2019) Special teams analyst; Florida (2020–2021) Special teams quality control coach

Awards and highlights
- Second-team All-Pro (2005); Pro Bowl (2005); Cincinnati Bengals 40th Anniversary Team; Big East Special Teams Player of the Year (1999)

Career NFL statistics
- Field goals: 277
- Field goal attempts: 324
- Field goal %: 85.5%
- Longest field goal: 54
- Touchbacks: 77
- Stats at Pro Football Reference

Michael Shayne Graham (born December 9, 1977) is an American former professional football placekicker who played in the National Football League (NFL) for 15 seasons. Graham played for 10 different NFL teams, tied with Tillie Voss and Nick Vannett for the most in league history.

Graham played college football for the Virginia Tech Hokies, winning Big East Special Teams Player of the Year in 1999. An undrafted free agent, he began his NFL career with the Buffalo Bills in 2001. His longest stint was with the Cincinnati Bengals, where he spent seven seasons and received Pro Bowl and second-team All-Pro honors in 2005. Graham was named to the Cincinnati Bengals 40th Anniversary Team in 2007.

== Early life ==
Graham attended Pulaski County High School in Dublin, Virginia, graduating in 1996. He holds many of the school's kicking records including most field goals in career (28, from 1992 to 1995), most field goals in a season (15, 1995), and longest field goal, a 54-yarder against Anacostia in 1995.

== College career ==
Graham played college football at Virginia Tech and was named to the first-team All-Big East Conference in all four seasons. In 1999, as a senior, Graham earned Big East Special Teams Player of the Year honors after leading the conference and breaking the school's single-season scoring record with 107 points on 56-of-57 extra points and 17-of-22 field goals. He was 68-of-93 (73.1%) in field goals for his Virginia Tech career and set a Virginia Tech and Big East record with 97 consecutive successful extra points. He left Virginia Tech as the all-time scoring leader in school history and Big East history with 371 points. His contributions at Tech led to his induction in the Virginia Tech Sports Hall of Fame.

== Professional career ==
=== Richmond Speed ===
Following a tryout with the Cleveland Browns, it was announced in May 2000, that Graham would play in two games for the Richmond Speed of the AF2, and that he would use the time to practice for a future NFL tryout with the Tennessee Titans. As it turned out Graham played in only one game for the Speed, a 60 - 21 loss against the Arkansas Twisters on May 26, 2000. During the game, he missed two field goals, from 36 and 44-yards, and two of three extra points. After the game, Graham told the Roanoke Times: "It was a big adjustment. In the arena game, the holder puts the ball down, then the kicker starts forward. I've always been accustomed to starting with the snap. My rhythm was all messed up." Graham left the team and was replaced by special teams coach Dave DeArmas, who unretired and played in the following week's game against the Jacksonville Tomcats.

=== New Orleans Saints (first stint) ===
After going undrafted in the 2000 NFL draft, Graham signed with the New Orleans Saints on June 30, 2000. Graham was 1-for-1 on extra points and did not attempt a field goal during the preseason. He was waived on August 22.

=== Seattle Seahawks ===
Graham was signed by the Seattle Seahawks on April 27, 2001. He was 6-for-6 on extra points in the preseason but had his only field goal attempt blocked. He was waived on September 2. On October 30, Graham was invited back for a tryout after kicker Rian Lindell missed two field goals in a 24–20 loss to the Miami Dolphins. Graham did not get a contract and Lindell was retained as the Seahawks' kicker for the remainder of the 2001 season.

=== Buffalo Bills ===
The Buffalo Bills signed Graham on November 27, 2001, to replace rookie kicker Jake Arians; Arians had missed several key field goals and a crucial extra point over the course of the season. Graham played in the Bills' final six games, going 6-for-8 on field goals. He was released on April 23, 2002, and replaced by Mike Hollis.

=== Seattle Seahawks (second stint) ===
Graham was re-signed by the Seahawks on May 13, 2002. He began training camp with Seattle before being waived on August 13.

=== Carolina Panthers ===
Graham signed with the Carolina Panthers on September 28, 2002, after an injury to veteran John Kasay. Originally, Jon Hilbert replaced Kasay; however, after missing two field goals during the Week 3 game versus the Minnesota Vikings, Hilbert was replaced by Graham. The following week, in a game against the Green Bay Packers and after being on the team for only two days, Graham missed a 24-yard field goal inches to the right with 13 seconds remaining that would have tied the score. The Panthers ended up losing the game 17–14. In total he played in 11 of the Panthers' final 13 games, leading the team in scoring with 60 points. He was 13-of-18 on field goals and averaged 66 yards on his five kickoffs.

After spending the 2003 preseason with Carolina, Graham was waived on August 31, right before the season began.

=== Cincinnati Bengals ===
==== 2003 season ====
The Cincinnati Bengals claimed Graham off waivers on September 1, 2003. With the Bengals in 2003, Graham played in all 16 games and set a franchise record by making 88% (22-of-25) of his field goals.

In the following offseason, Graham was tendered a restricted free agent offer sheet by the Jacksonville Jaguars, but the offer was matched by the Bengals.

==== 2004 season ====
In 2004, Graham narrowly missed matching his previous season's accuracy mark, finishing the year 27-of-31 (87.1%) on field goals. In 2005, Graham made 28-of-32 field goals (87.5%), scored a franchise record 131 points, was selected to be the kicker for the AFC Pro Bowl squad, and helped the Bengals record their first winning season since 1990. Graham was the first kicker in franchise history ever to be selected to play in a Pro Bowl.

==== 2005 season ====
In 2005, Graham set the NFL record for tackles by a kicker with 11 combined (7 plus 4 assists.)

==== 2006 season ====
In 2006, Graham finished fourth in the AFC with 115 points and was 25-of-30 (83.3%) on field goals on the season.

==== 2007 season ====
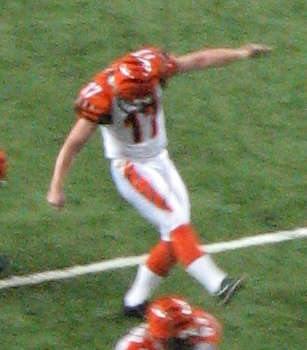
Graham in a 2007 preseason game against the Atlanta Falcons

In 2007, Graham missed his first field goal attempt of the season (a 53-yard attempt). But after that, he set a Bengals record by kicking 21 consecutive field goals without a miss over the season's first 10 games. This included a game against the Baltimore Ravens where he set a franchise record by kicking 7 field goals (the second highest total in NFL history). His streak came to an end when he missed a 26-yard attempt in Week 12. By the end of the season, Graham set new franchise records for field goals in a season (31) and field goal percentage (91.2). His 2007 record would eventually be broken by Evan McPherson in 2026.

==== 2008 season ====
In 2008, Graham went 21-of-24, (87.5%).

==== 2009 season ====
In 2009, Graham went 23-of-28 in the regular season, his lowest percentage, 82.1, in his Bengals career. In the Wild Card playoffs on January 9, 2010, Graham missed two field goals in the Bengals' 24–14 loss to the New York Jets, including a 28-yard attempt that would have cut the score to 24–17 late in the fourth quarter. After the game, Marvin Lewis commented on Graham's missed field goals stating "It is a shame, and it killed us. Unfortunately kicking is mostly a one-man operation. I know Shayne feels worse about it than anyone. Those points obviously make a big difference."

He was not re-signed as an unrestricted free agent following the 2009 season.

=== Baltimore Ravens (first stint) ===
In June 2010, Graham signed a one-year contract with the Baltimore Ravens worth up to $2.5 million. Graham was released during final cuts before the season started in favor of Billy Cundiff.

=== New York Giants ===
On October 16, 2010, the New York Giants signed Graham due to an injury to kicker Lawrence Tynes. Graham only played in one game for the Giants and did not attempt a field goal. He did, however, make all four of his extra point attempts. On October 18, just two days after being signed, the Giants released Graham.

=== New England Patriots ===
On November 10, 2010, the New England Patriots signed Graham after an injury to kicker Stephen Gostkowski. In his first game, in Week 10 against the Pittsburgh Steelers, Graham was 2-for-2 on field goals but missed one of four extra point attempts on the night. In eight games, Graham finished the 2010 season 12-for-12 on field goals, and 35-for-37 on extra points. In the playoffs, Graham was 2-for-2 in the Patriots' loss to the New York Jets.

=== Washington Redskins ===
On August 1, 2011, the Washington Redskins signed Graham to provide training camp competition for Graham Gano. After missing two field goals in a pre-season game, Graham was released.

=== Dallas Cowboys ===
On August 23, 2011, the Dallas Cowboys signed Graham due to a hip injury to David Buehler, but did not make the roster after being passed on the depth chart by rookie Dan Bailey.

=== Miami Dolphins ===
The Miami Dolphins signed Graham on November 19, 2011, after an injury to Dan Carpenter. Graham was waived November 30.

=== Baltimore Ravens (second stint) ===
The Baltimore Ravens signed Graham on December 21, 2011, to back up Billy Cundiff, who had a calf injury throughout most of December. He made both field goal attempts and both extra point attempts in his short stint with the team. Graham was released on January 3.

=== Houston Texans ===
The Texans signed Graham on May 7, 2012, to battle rookie Randy Bullock for the position. In August, Graham was named the team's kicker after Bullock went on injured reserve. On January 13, 2013, Graham set his career longest field goal after he made a 55-yard field goal against the New England Patriots in the divisional round of the playoffs.

=== Cleveland Browns ===
On April 15, 2013, the Cleveland Browns signed Graham to replace Phil Dawson who left as a free agent. On August 31, he was surprisingly released, even after making all of his pre-season attempts, leaving the Browns with no kicker on the roster days before the season began.

=== Pittsburgh Steelers ===
On September 9, 2013, the Pittsburgh Steelers signed Graham due to a hamstring injury to Shaun Suisham. Graham was on the roster for one game, but was inactive due to Suisham's ability to play through his injury. Since he was not needed, Graham was released by the Steelers on September 17.

=== New Orleans Saints (second stint) ===
Graham was re-signed by the New Orleans Saints on December 17, 2013, to replace Garrett Hartley. Hartley had been cut from the Saints after he had struggled in the 2012 and 2013 seasons and the final straw came when he missed two close range field goals in a game against the St. Louis Rams. On January 4, 2014, Graham went 4-for-4 including a 32-yard game winner as time expired to propel the Saints past the Philadelphia Eagles in the Wild Card round of the 2013-14 playoffs. However, the following week during the Divisional Round game, he missed two field goals in a 23–15 loss to the eventual Super Bowl XLVIII champion Seattle Seahawks. On his first miss, from 45 yards, holder (and backup quarterback) Luke McCown had the laces facing the wrong way. Strong winds also contributed to his poor performance.

On February 14, 2014, the Saints re-signed Graham to a new one-year contract with a base salary of $955,000. In a surprise move, Graham along with kicker Derek Dimke were released as part of the final roster cuts on August 30, 2014, leaving the Saints with no kickers on their roster after the reduction to 53-players. A few days later on September 2, it was announced that the Saints had waived quarterback Ryan Griffin to make room for the re-signing of Graham to their 53-man roster.

Graham was selected as NFC special teams player of the month for October 2014, for making all nine field goals and all nine extra points he tried during the month. He also scored 14 points during the October 26, 2014 victory over the Green Bay Packers.

After Graham missed a 42-yard field goal during the Saints' loss to the Carolina Panthers on December 7, 2014, the Saints tried out kickers Garrett Hartley, Derek Dimke, and Zach Hocker on December 10, 2014. However, in the end the Saints decided to stick with Graham as their kicker.

On February 12, 2015, Graham was re-signed to a one-year contract with the Saints. He was released on May 19.

=== Atlanta Falcons ===
On November 26, 2015, Graham signed with the Atlanta Falcons as a replacement kicker, after Matt Bryant injured his leg. On August 20, 2016, Graham was re-signed by the Falcons. On September 3, Graham was released by the Falcons.

On February 6, 2017, Graham announced his retirement from the NFL at the age of 39 to pursue jobs as a special teams coach. Graham signed an unofficial ceremonial contract on February 21, to retire as a Bengal.

== Coaching career ==
=== Central Michigan ===
In March 2017, Graham was hired as a special teams coach at Central Michigan University

=== Michigan State ===
In June 2018, Graham was hired at Michigan State University as a special teams intern.

=== Florida ===
Graham was hired at the University of Florida in 2020 as a special teams quality control coach.

== NFL career statistics ==
Legend
**Bold**	Career high

Year	Team	GP	Field Goals									Extra Points			Total Points
Year	Team	GP	FGM	FGA	FG%	<20	20−29	30−39	40−49	50+	Lng	XPM	XPA	XP%	Total Points
2001	BUF	6	6	8	75.0	0−0	4−4	0−0	2−4	0−0	41	7	7	**100.0**	25
2002	CAR	11	13	18	72.2	**1−1**	2−4	2−3	6−8	2−2	50	21	21	**100.0**	60
2003	CIN	16	22	25	88.0	0−0	5−5	10−10	7−8	0−2	48	40	40	**100.0**	106
2004	CIN	16	27	31	87.1	0−0	7−7	10−12	7−8	3−4	**53**	41	41	**100.0**	122
2005	CIN	16	28	32	87.5	0−0	**11−11**	10−11	7−9	0−1	49	**47**	**47**	**100.0**	131
2006	CIN	16	25	30	83.3	0−0	9−9	8−9	6−8	2−4	51	40	42	95.2	115
2007	CIN	16	**31**	34	91.2	**1−1**	11−12	**13−13**	6−7	0−1	48	37	37	**100.0**	130
2008	CIN	14	21	24	87.5	**1−1**	5−5	6−7	**9−11**	0−0	45	15	15	**100.0**	78
2009	CIN	16	23	28	82.1	0−0	11−12	8−10	3−3	2−4	**53**	28	29	96.6	97
2010	NYG	1	0	0	0.0	0−0	0−0	0−0	0−0	0−0	0	4	4	**100.0**	4
2010	NE	8	12	12	**100.0**	**1−1**	5−5	5−5	1−1	0−0	41	35	37	94.6	71
2011	MIA	2	4	5	80.0	0−0	4−4	0−0	0−1	0−0	28	6	6	**100.0**	18
2011	BAL	1	2	2	**100.0**	0−0	0−0	0−0	2−2	0−0	48	2	2	**100.0**	8
2012	HOU	16	**31**	**38**	81.6	**1−1**	8−8	11−11	7−9	**4−9**	51	45	45	**100.0**	**138**
2013	NO	2	2	2	**100.0**	0−0	1−1	0−0	1−1	0−0	40	7	7	**100.0**	13
2014	NO	16	19	22	86.4	0−0	6−9	9−9	3−5	1−2	50	46	**47**	97.9	103
2015	ATL	5	11	13	84.6	0−0	2−2	4−4	2−4	3−3	54	8	8	**100.0**	41
Career		178	277	324	85.5	5−5	90−94	96−104	69−89	17−32	54	429	435	99.1	1260

=== Bengals franchise records ===
- Most field goals in a season (31)
- Most field goals in a game (7)
- Highest field goal percentage in a season (91.2)
- Highest field goal percentage in a career (86.8)

== See also ==
- List of NFL players by most teams played for
