= John Thornton (defensive tackle, born 1976) =

American football player (born 1976)

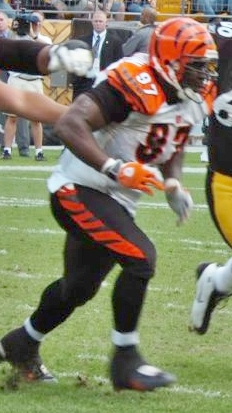
- Thornton in 2006 with the Cincinnati Bengals

No. 78, 97
- Position: Defensive tackle

Personal information
- Born: October 2, 1976 (age 50); Philadelphia, Pennsylvania, U.S.
- Listed height: 6 ft 3 in (1.91 m)
- Listed weight: 297 lb (135 kg)

Career information
- College: West Virginia
- NFL draft: 1999: 2nd round, 52nd overall pick

Career history
- Tennessee Titans (1999–2002); Cincinnati Bengals (2003–2008)

Career NFL statistics
- Total tackles: 303
- Sacks: 27.5
- Forced fumbles: 4
- Fumble recoveries: 6
- Interceptions: 1
- Stats at Pro Football Reference

John Jason Thornton (born October 2, 1976) is an American former professional football player who was a defensive tackle in the National Football League (NFL). He played college football for the West Virginia Mountaineers and was selected by the Tennessee Titans in the second round of the 1999 NFL draft.

In addition to four years in Tennessee, Thornton also played six seasons with the Cincinnati Bengals. He retired following the 2008 season.

== Early life ==
Thornton attended Scotland School for Veterans' Children in Chambersburg, Pennsylvania, a residential school for relatives of veterans. Thornton played football and basketball at SSVC, winning a PIAA-A state championship in basketball in 1994.

== College career ==
Thornton attended West Virginia University and was a two-time All-Big East selection. As a senior, he was defensive co-captain and earned First-team All-America honors from The Sports Network. He also started every game his last three seasons. He also became a member of Alpha Phi Alpha fraternity.

== Professional career ==
Pre-draft measurables
Height	Weight	40-yard dash	10-yard split	20-yard split	20-yard shuttle	Three-cone drill	Vertical jump	Broad jump	Bench press
6 ft 3 in (1.91 m)	299 lb (136 kg)	5.00 s	1.72 s	2.89 s	4.46 s	8.09 s	32.0 in (0.81 m)	9 ft 3 in (2.82 m)	26 reps
All values from NFL Combine

=== Tennessee Titans ===
Thornton was selected by the Tennessee Titans in the second round (52nd overall) in the 1999 NFL draft. He made his debut against the Cincinnati Bengals on September 12 and recorded one tackle. During the regular season he made 4.5 sacks which was the most made by any rookie defensive tackle. He appeared in Super Bowl XXXIV for the Titans against the St. Louis Rams.

In 2000, Thornton started in every game for the Titans and finished the season with 55 tackles. He recorded eight tackles, his seasonhigh in the game at the Buffalo Bills on September 3. Due to a shoulder injury, he only played in the first three games in 2001. In 2002, just as he did in 2000, he started in every game for the Titans and was part of the defense that limited their opponents to 89.0 rushing yards per game. He recorded 44 tackles in the regular season.

=== Cincinnati Bengals ===
In 2003, Thornton signed with the Cincinnati Bengals and recorded a career-high six sacks. In 2004, he started in every game and recorded 74 tackles. In 2005, he played 16 games, making 24 solo tackles, 18 assists, and two sacks. In 2006, he played 15 games, making 28 solo tackles, 15 assists, and two sacks. In 2007, he played 14 games, making 24 solo tackles, eight assists, and one sack. In 2008, he played in 13 games, recording 24 solo tackles, six assists and three sacks.
