= Tory James =

American football player (born 1973)

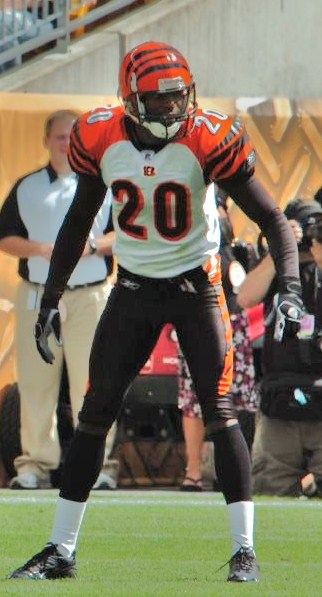
- James with the Cincinnati Bengals in 2006

No. 20, 26
- Position: Cornerback

Personal information
- Born: May 18, 1973 (age 53); New Orleans, Louisiana, U.S.
- Listed height: 6 ft 2 in (1.88 m)
- Listed weight: 190 lb (86 kg)

Career information
- High school: Archbishop Shaw (Marrero, Louisiana)
- College: LSU
- NFL draft: 1996: 2nd round, 44th overall pick

Career history
- Denver Broncos (1996–1999); Oakland Raiders (2000–2002); Cincinnati Bengals (2003–2006); New England Patriots (2007)*
- * Offseason or practice squad member only

Awards and highlights
- 2× Super Bowl champion (XXXII, XXXIII); Pro Bowl (2004)

Career NFL statistics
- Tackles: 416
- Sacks: 1.0
- Forced fumbles: 5
- Fumble recoveries: 4
- Interceptions: 39
- Defensive touchdowns: 1
- Stats at Pro Football Reference

Tory Steven James (born May 18, 1973) is an American former professional football player who was a cornerback for 11 seasons in the National Football League (NFL). James attended Archbishop Shaw High School before going to college at Louisiana State University.

== Professional career ==
=== Denver Broncos ===
The Denver Broncos selected James in the second round (44th overall) of the 1996 NFL draft. James was the third cornerback drafted in 1996.

==== 1996 season ====
On July 22, 1996, the Broncos signed James to a four—year, $2.20 million rookie contract that included a signing bonus of $735,000. He entered training camp as a backup cornerback under defensive coordinator Greg Robinson. Head coach Mike Shanahan named James a backup and listed him as the fourth cornerback on the depth chart to begin the regular season, behind starters Ray Crockett and Lionel Washington and primary backup Randy Hilliard.

On September 1, 1996, James made his professional regular season debut in the Denver Broncos' home-opener against the New York Jets and recorded one solo tackle in their 31–6 victory. On November 17, 1996, James earned his first career start due to injuries to Lionel Washington and Randy Hilliard. He recorded two solo tackles as the Broncos won 34–8 at the New England Patriots. The following week, he set a season-high with five solo tackles during a 21–17 win at the Miami Dolphins in Week 13. On December 1, 1996, James made three combined tackles (two solo), forced a fumble, recovered a fumble, and had the first interception of his career after picking off a pass Rick Mirer attempted to throw to wide receiver Joey Galloway as the Broncos routed the Seattle Seahawks 34–7. He finished his rookie campaign with 23 combined tackles (22 solo), two interceptions, a forced fumble, and one fumble recovery while appearing in all 16 games with two starts.

==== 1997 season ====
He entered training camp in 1997 slated to takeover as a starting cornerback following the departure of Lionel Washington and was expected to have a breakout season. On July 26, 1997, James suffered a knee injury in the first quarter of the Broncos' first pre-season game as they routed the Buffalo Bills 31–10. He remained on injured reserve throughout the entire 1997 NFL season due to a torn patellar tendon in his right knee. The Denver Broncos would go on to finish the season with a 12–4 record and defeated the Green Bay Packers 31–24 to win Super Bowl XXXII.

==== 1998 season ====
Entering training camp, James was relegated to serving as a backup after Darrien Gordon supplanted himself as a starter during his absence. He competed for the role as the third cornerback on the depth chart against Darrius Johnson. Head coach Mike Shanahan named James a backup and listed him as the fourth cornerback on the depth chart to open the regular season, behind Ray Crockett, Darrien Gordon, and Darrius Johnson. In Week 8, James set a season-high with five solo tackles as the Broncos defeated the Jacksonville Jaguars 37–24. He was limited to 11 combined tackles (10 solo) and one fumble recovery while appearing in all 16 games with zero starts.

The Denver Broncos finished the 1998 NFL season atop the AFC West with a 14–2 record, earning a first-round bye and clinching a playoff berth. On January 9, 1999, James recorded two solo tackles as the Broncos routed the Miami Dolphins 38–3 in the AFC Divisional Round. They would go on to defeat the New York Jets 23–10 to win the AFC Championship Game. On January 31, 1999, James appeared in Super Bowl XXXIII as the Denver Broncos defeated the Atlanta Falcons 34–19.

==== 1999 season ====
He returned to training camp and was slated to remain a backup after the Broncos signed free agent Dale Carter in order to replace Darrien Gordon who departed in free agency. He began the regular season listed as the fourth cornerback on the depth chart, behind Ray Crockett, Dale Carter, and Darrius Johnson. On October 10, 1999, James made three solo tackles, a pass deflection, and secured a 16–13 victory at the Oakland Raiders by intercepting a pass Rich Gannon attempted to throw to wide receiver Terry Mickens with 57 seconds remaining in the game. In Week 9, he made one solo tackle, a pass deflection, and secured a 33–17 victory at the San Diego Chargers after intercepting a pass thrown by Jim Harbaugh to end the game. On January 2, 2000, James set a season-high with six solo tackles, a career-high with three pass deflections, and intercepted two passes by Jim Harbaugh during a 12–6 loss to the San Diego Chargers. He finished the 1999 NFL season with 36 combined tackles (34 solo), 11 pass deflections, and five interceptions in 16 games and four starts.

=== Oakland Raiders ===
==== 2000 season ====
On February 13, 2000, the Oakland Raiders signed James to a five—year, $18 million contract as an unrestricted free agent. Entering training camp, James was slated to takeover as the starting nickelback under new defensive coordinator Chuck Bresnahan. Head coach Jon Gruden named James the third cornerback on the depth chart to begin the regular season and the starting nickelback, behind starting veteran tandem Charles Woodson and Eric Allen.

On September 10, 2000, James made two solo tackles, two pass deflections, two interceptions, and sealed the Raiders' 38–31 win at the Indianapolis Colts by picking off a pass Peyton Manning threw to wide receiver Marvin Harrison with 1:11 remaining in the game. In Week 9, he set a season-high with seven solo tackles and made one pass deflection during a 15–13 win at the San Diego Chargers. He finished the 2000 NFL season with 34 combined tackles (30 solo), nine pass deflections, and two interceptions in 16 games and one start.

The Oakland Raiders finished the season with a 12–4 record, earning a playoff berth and a first-round bye. On January 6, 2001, James recorded seven combined tackles (six solo), made three pass deflections, two interceptions, and scored his first career touchdown on a pick-six during a 0–27 shutout against the Miami Dolphins in the AFC Divisional Round. His touchdown occurred during the first quarter after he intercepted Jay Fiedler and returned it for a 90—yard touchdown. The following game, he was limited to one solo tackle during the Raiders' 3–16 loss to the Baltimore Ravens in the AFC Championship Game. The Raiders would be eliminated from the playoffs and the Ravens would go on to win Super Bowl XXXV.

==== 2001 season ====
He returned as the Raiders' starting nickelback and remained as the third cornerback on the depth chart behind Charles Woodson and Eric Allen. On November 5, 2001, James set a season-high with seven solo tackles, made three pass deflections, and made a key interception late in the fourth quarter, picking off a pass Brian Griese threw to wide receiver Rod Smith during a 28–38 victory against the Denver Broncos. In Week 10, he made three pass deflections and sealed a 34–24 victory at the San Diego Chargers after intercepting a pass Doug Flutie attempted to throw to wide receiver Jeff Graham with 11 seconds remaining. The following game, James recorded five combined tackles (four solo) and set a season-high with four pass deflections during a 28–10 victory at the New York Giants in Week 11. He finished the season with 36 combined tackles (33 solo), 15 pass deflections, and five interceptions in 16 games and two starts.

The Oakland Raiders finished the 2001 NFL season in first place in the AFC West with a 10—6 record, clinching a playoff berth. On January 19, 2002, James started in the AFC Divisional Round and recorded five combined tackles (four solo) and made one pass deflection as the Raiders controversially lost in overtime 13—16 at the New England Patriots.

==== 2002 season ====
The Raiders promoted offensive coordinator Bill Callahan to head coach after they traded head coach Jon Gruden. Throughout training camp, James competed against rookie first round pick (17th overall) Phillip Buchanon to earn a starting role at cornerback following the retirement of Eric Allen. Head coach Bill Callahan named James a starting cornerback to begin the regular season, alongside Charles Woodson.

On October 6, 2002, James recorded two solo tackles, set a season-high with four pass deflections, and tied his career-high of two interceptions on pass attempts by Drew Bledsoe during a 49—31 victory at the Buffalo Bills. In Week 7, he set a season-high with eight combined tackles (seven solo) as the Raiders lost in overtime 21—27 to the San Diego Chargers. On December 8, 2002, James made two solo tackles, three pass deflections, and intercepted a pass attempt by Drew Brees during a 27—7 victory at the San Diego Chargers. During the game, James sustained a leg injury, but chose to return to complete the game after receiving a pain killing injection. On December 12, 2002, James underwent surgery and had a metal plate implanted on his fibula due to a fracture and was subsequently sidelined for the next two games (Weeks 15—16). He finished the season with a total of 45 combined tackles (41 solo), 19 pass deflections, and four interceptions in 14 games and 14 starts.

The Oakland Raiders finished first in the AFC West in 2002 with an 11—5 record to clinch a playoff berth and a first round bye. On January 12, 2003, James started in the AFC Divisional Round and made two solo tackles, three pass deflections, and intercepted a pass by Chad Pennington as the Raiders routed the New York Jets 30—10. The following week, the Raiders defeated the Tennessee Titans 41—24 in the AFC Championship Game to advance to the Super Bowl. On January 26, 2003, James started in Super Bowl XXXVII and recorded four solo tackles and one pass deflection as they lost 21—48 to the Tampa Bay Buccaneers.

==== 2003 season ====
On February 27, 2003, the Oakland Raiders officially released James along with five other players due to salary cap concerns. Throughout free agency he received interest from multiple teams and had contract offers from the Minnesota Vikings and Cincinnati Bengals.

=== Cincinnati Bengals ===
On March 9, 2003, the Cincinnati Bengals signed James to a four—year, $14.40 million contract that included an initial signing bonus of $3.70 million. He entered training camp slated as the No. 1 starting cornerback under new defensive coordinator Leslie Frazier. Head coach Marvin Lewis named James the No. 1 starting cornerback to begin the regular season, alongside Jeff Burris.

On September 7, 2003, James started in the Cincinnati Bengals' home-opener against the Denver Broncos and made five combined tackles (four solo), two pass deflections, and had his first interception as part of the Bengals on a pass thrown by Jake Plummer during a 30—10 loss. On November 23, 2003, James set a career-high with ten solo tackles, made three pass deflections, and had the first sack of his career on Doug Flutie for a one—yard loss during a 34—27 win at the San Diego Chargers. He started in all 16 games for the first time in his career, finishing with a career-high 67 combined tackles (61 solo), 18 pass deflections, four interceptions, and one sack.

==== 2004 season ====
He retained his role as the No. 1 starting cornerback and began the regular season alongside Deltha O'Neal. On October 17, 2004, James made five solo tackles, two pass deflections, and set a season-high with two interceptions on passes thrown by Jeff Garcia as the Bengals lost 17—34 at the Cleveland Browns. In Week 10, he set a season-high with seven solo tackles, deflected a pass, and intercepted a pass Patrick Ramsey attempted to throw to wide receiver Laveranues Coles during a 17—10 victory at the Washington Redskins. In Week 12, he had one pass deflection and added to his career-high with his seventh interception of the season after picking off Kelly Holcomb as the Bengals defeated the Browns 58—48. On January 2, 2005, James recorded four solo tackles, made two pass deflections, and set a new career-high with his eighth interception of the season after picking off a pass attempt thrown by Koy Detmer during a 38—10 victory at the Philadelphia Eagles. He started all 16 games for the second consecutive season and finished with 63 combined tackles (58 solo), 13 pass deflections, eight interceptions, two forced fumbles, and one fumble recovery. He was voted onto the AFC Pro Bowl squad.

==== 2005 season ====
The Cincinnati Bengals elected not ti re-sign defensive coordinator Leslie Frazier following the 2004 NFL season and chose to promote Chuck Bresnahan to replace him. Bresnahan was previously the Raiders' defensive coordinator while James was with the organization. Head coach Marvin Lewis retained James and Deltha O'Neal as the starting cornerbacks to begin the regular season. On October 30, 2005, James tied his season-high of five solo tackles, made one pass deflection, and intercepted a pass attempt by Brett Favre to running back Tony Fisher during a 14—21 victory against the Green Bay Packers. He started in all 16 games for the third consecutive season and made 58 combined tackles (49 solo), 14 pass deflections, five interceptions, and one fumble recovery.

==== 2006 season ====
Throughout training camp, James competed against Deltha O'Neal and rookie first round pick Johnathan Joseph to retain his starting role at cornerback. Head coach Marvin Lewis named James the No. 1 starting cornerback to begin the season and paired him with rookie Johnathan Joseph. On November 26, 2006, James made one solo tackle, set a season-high with three pass deflections, and set another season-high with two interceptions on passes by Charlie Frye during a 30—0 victory at the Cleveland Browns. In Week 14, he set a season-high with six combined tackles (five solo) and had one pass break-up as the Bengals defeated the Oakland Raiders 27—10. On December 31, 2006, James made one solo tackle, two pass deflections, and had the last interception of his career, picking off a pass attempt Ben Roethlisberger threw to wide receiver Santonio Holmes during a 23—17 overtime loss to the Pittsburgh Steelers. He started all 16 games throughout the 2006 NFL season and finished with 43 combined tackles (34 solo), 14 pass deflections, and four interceptions.

==== 2007 season ====
On February 9, 2007, Cincinnati Bengals' head coach Marvin Lewis indicated that the Bengals would not be attempting to re-sign James as he entered free agency. The Bengals went on to replace him by picking cornerback Leon Hall (18th overall) in the first round of the 2007 NFL draft.

=== New England Patriots ===
On April 17, 2007, the New England Patriots signed James to a one—year, $1.35 million contract as an unrestricted free agent. The Patriots signed James in order to provide depth as No. 1 starting cornerback Asante Samuel continued to miss training camp due to a contract holdout.

On September 9, 2007, the New England Patriots released James as part of their final roster cuts.

== NFL career statistics ==
Legend
	Won the Super Bowl
	Led the league
**Bold**	Career high

=== Regular season ===
Year	Team	Games		Tackles				Interceptions				Fumbles			
Year	Team	GP	GS	Comb	Solo	Ast	Sck	Int	Yds	TD	Lng	FF	FR	Yds	TD
1996	DEN	16	2	23	22	1	0.0	2	15	0	15	1	**1**	15	0
1998	DEN	16	0	11	10	1	0.0	0	0	0	0	0	**1**	0	0
1999	DEN	16	4	36	34	2	0.0	5	59	0	**45**	1	0	0	0
2000	OAK	16	1	34	30	4	0.0	2	25	0	25	0	0	0	0
2001	OAK	16	2	36	33	3	0.0	5	**72**	0	33	0	0	0	0
2002	OAK	14	13	45	41	4	0.0	4	35	0	27	0	0	0	0
2003	CIN	16	16	**67**	**61**	6	**1.0**	4	56	0	31	0	0	0	0
2004	CIN	16	16	63	58	5	0.0	**8**	66	0	23	**2**	**1**	0	0
2005	CIN	16	16	58	49	**9**	0.0	5	5	0	5	1	**1**	**26**	0
2006	CIN	16	16	43	34	**9**	0.0	4	44	0	28	0	0	0	0
		158	86	416	372	44	1.0	39	377	0	45	5	4	41	0

=== Playoffs ===
Year	Team	Games		Tackles				Interceptions				Fumbles			
Year	Team	GP	GS	Comb	Solo	Ast	Sck	Int	Yds	TD	Lng	FF	FR	Yds	TD
1996	DEN	1	0	2	2	0	0.0	0	0	0	0	0	0	0	0
1998	DEN	3	0	2	2	0	0.0	0	0	0	0	0	0	0	0
2000	OAK	2	0	**8**	7	**1**	0.0	**2**	**98**	**1**	**90**	**1**	0	0	0
2001	OAK	2	0	**8**	7	**1**	0.0	0	0	0	0	0	0	0	0
2002	OAK	3	3	**8**	**8**	0	0.0	1	0	0	0	**1**	0	0	0
2005	CIN	1	1	4	3	**1**	0.0	0	0	0	0	0	0	0	0
		12	4	32	29	3	0.0	3	98	1	90	2	0	0	0
