= Duane Clemons =

American football player (born 1974)

No. 92, 99
- Position: Defensive end

Personal information
- Born: May 23, 1974 (age 52); Riverside, California, U.S.
- Listed height: 6 ft 5 in (1.96 m)
- Listed weight: 275 lb (125 kg)

Career information
- High school: John W. North (Riverside)
- College: California (1992–1995)
- NFL draft: 1996: 1st round, 16th overall pick

Career history
- Minnesota Vikings (1996–1999); Kansas City Chiefs (2000–2002); Cincinnati Bengals (2003–2005); Toronto Argonauts (2008)*
- * Offseason or practice squad member only

Awards and highlights
- Second-team All-American (1995); First-team All-Pac-10 (1995)

Career NFL statistics
- Tackles: 340
- Sacks: 49.5
- Fumble recoveries: 11
- Stats at Pro Football Reference

Duane Anthony Clemons (born May 23, 1974) is an American former professional football player who was a defensive end in the National Football League (NFL) between 1996 and 2005. He played college football for the California Golden Bears and was selected by the Minnesota Vikings in the first round of the 1996 NFL draft .

He finished his NFL career with 49.5 sacks. Despite struggling to see the field as a starter (16 starts in 4 years with Minnesota), Clemons proved a very capable sack artist. In 1997, he finished with 7.0 sacks, 2 forced fumbles, and 24 tackles. In 1999, he finished with a career-best 9.0 sacks and 36 tackles.

On November 10, 1999, Clemons was fined $7,500 for intentionally punching Flozell Adams in the testes following an interception two days earlier during a Monday Night Football game against the Dallas Cowboys. While Adams maintained that he didn't know why Clemons punched him, Clemons stated that he threw the punch because Adams illegally took him down from behind on an interception return.

In 2000, he went to the Kansas City Chiefs, where he finished with 7.5 sacks and a career-best 56 tackles. The next year, 2001, he finished with 7.0 sacks and 48 tackles. In 2003, he found himself with the Cincinnati Bengals, where he recorded 6.0 sacks, a career-best 4 pass deflections, and 42 tackles. In 2004, he finished with 6.5 sacks and 49 tackles.

On September 8, 2008, Clemons signed with the Toronto Argonauts of the Canadian Football League and was assigned to their practice roster, but was released by the team on September 15, 2008. He later became the defensive line coach for the MidAmerica Nazarene University Pioneers.

== NFL career statistics ==
Legend
| | Led the league |
| **Bold** | Career high |

=== Regular season ===
| Year | Team | Games | | Tackles | | | | Interceptions | | | | Fumbles | | | |
| Year | Team | GP | GS | Comb | Solo | Ast | Sck | Int | Yds | TD | Lng | FF | FR | Yds | TD |
|---|---|---|---|---|---|---|---|---|---|---|---|---|---|---|---|
| 1996 | MIN | 13 | 0 | 7 | 2 | 5 | 0.0 | 0 | 0 | 0 | 0 | 0 | 1 | 8 | 0 |
| 1997 | MIN | 13 | 3 | 24 | 23 | 1 | 7.0 | 0 | 0 | 0 | 0 | 2 | 1 | 0 | 0 |
| 1998 | MIN | 16 | 4 | 25 | 17 | 8 | 2.5 | 0 | 0 | 0 | 0 | 1 | 0 | 0 | 0 |
| 1999 | MIN | 16 | 9 | 39 | 32 | 7 | **9.0** | 0 | 0 | 0 | 0 | 2 | **4** | 0 | 0 |
| 2000 | KAN | 12 | 12 | **56** | **47** | 9 | 7.5 | 0 | 0 | 0 | 0 | 1 | 1 | 0 | 0 |
| 2001 | KAN | 16 | 15 | 49 | 37 | 12 | 7.0 | 0 | 0 | 0 | 0 | **3** | 1 | 0 | 0 |
| 2002 | KAN | 16 | 16 | 35 | 27 | 8 | 2.0 | 0 | 0 | 0 | 0 | 0 | 1 | **42** | **1** |
| 2003 | CIN | 16 | 13 | 43 | 36 | 7 | 6.0 | 0 | 0 | 0 | 0 | 2 | 1 | 0 | 0 |
| 2004 | CIN | 14 | 14 | 50 | 32 | **18** | 6.5 | 0 | 0 | 0 | 0 | 2 | 0 | 0 | 0 |
| 2005 | CIN | 10 | 0 | 12 | 10 | 2 | 2.0 | 0 | 0 | 0 | 0 | 0 | 1 | 0 | 0 |
| | | 142 | 86 | 340 | 263 | 77 | 49.5 | 0 | 0 | 0 | 0 | 13 | 11 | 50 | 1 |

=== Playoffs ===
| Year | Team | Games | | Tackles | | | | Interceptions | | | | Fumbles | | | |
| Year | Team | GP | GS | Comb | Solo | Ast | Sck | Int | Yds | TD | Lng | FF | FR | Yds | TD |
|---|---|---|---|---|---|---|---|---|---|---|---|---|---|---|---|
| 1997 | MIN | 2 | 0 | 1 | 1 | 0 | 0.0 | 0 | 0 | 0 | 0 | 0 | 0 | 0 | 0 |
| 1998 | MIN | 1 | 0 | 0 | 0 | 0 | 0.0 | 0 | 0 | 0 | 0 | 0 | 0 | 0 | 0 |
| 1999 | MIN | 2 | 2 | **4** | **3** | **1** | **1.0** | 0 | 0 | 0 | 0 | 0 | 0 | 0 | 0 |
| | | 5 | 2 | 5 | 4 | 1 | 1.0 | 0 | 0 | 0 | 0 | 0 | 0 | 0 | 0 |
