= Marcus Johnson (offensive lineman) =

American football player (born 1981)

Arkansas Razorbacks
- Title: Offensive line coach

Personal information
- Born: December 1, 1981 (age 44); Coffeeville, Mississippi, U.S.
- Listed height: 6 ft 6 in (1.98 m)
- Listed weight: 320 lb (145 kg)

Career information
- High school: Coffeeville
- College: Ole Miss
- NFL draft: 2005: 2nd round, 49th overall pick

Career history

Playing
- Minnesota Vikings (2005–2008); Oakland Raiders (2009)*; Tampa Bay Buccaneers (2009); Hartford Colonials (2010)*
- * Offseason or practice squad member only

Coaching
- Duke (2011–2012) Strength and conditioning assistant; Duke (2013–2015) Offensive quality control assistant; Duke (2016–2017) Offensive line; Mississippi State (2018–2019) Offensive line; Missouri (2020–2022) Offensive line; Purdue (2023–2024) Offensive line; Ohio State (2025) Assistant offensive line; Arkansas (2026–present) Offensive line

Awards and highlights
- Second-team All-SEC (2004)

Career NFL statistics
- Games played: 53
- Games started: 18
- Fumble recoveries: 1
- Stats at Pro Football Reference

Michael "Marcus" Johnson (born December 1, 1981) is an American college football coach and former professional player who was a guard in the National Football League (NFL). He played college football for the Ole Miss Rebels and was selected by the Minnesota Vikings in the second round of the 2005 NFL draft.

Johnson was also a member of the Oakland Raiders, Tampa Bay Buccaneers and Hartford Colonials. He is the younger brother of CFL offensive lineman Belton Johnson.
