= Kevin Hardy (linebacker) =

American football player (born 1973)

No. 51
- Position: Linebacker

Personal information
- Born: July 24, 1973 (age 53); Evansville, Indiana, U.S.
- Listed height: 6 ft 4 in (1.93 m)
- Listed weight: 259 lb (117 kg)

Career information
- High school: William Henry Harrison (Evansville)
- College: Illinois (1992–1995)
- NFL draft: 1996: 1st round, 2nd overall pick

Career history
- Jacksonville Jaguars (1996–2001); Dallas Cowboys (2002); Cincinnati Bengals (2003–2004)

Awards and highlights
- First-team All-Pro (1999); Pro Bowl (1999); PFWA All-Rookie Team (1996); Dick Butkus Award (1995); Consensus All-American (1995); 2× First-team All-Big Ten (1994, 1995); Freshman All-American (1992)

Career NFL statistics
- Tackles: 740
- Sacks: 36
- Forced fumbles: 9
- Fumble recoveries: 7
- Interceptions: 5
- Defensive touchdowns: 1
- Stats at Pro Football Reference

Kevin Lamont Hardy (born July 24, 1973) is an American former professional football player who was a linebacker in the National Football League (NFL) for the Jacksonville Jaguars, Dallas Cowboys, and Cincinnati Bengals. He played college football for the Illinois Fighting Illini.

== Early life ==
Hardy attended William Henry Harrison High School, where he received numerous awards and accolades as a high school football player.

As a senior, he posted 127 tackles (47 solo), 2 interceptions, 32 receptions for 610 yards and 13 touchdowns, 55 carries for 410 yards, returned 6 punts for 42 yards and 15 kickoffs for 344 yards. He received All-Evansville, City Player of the Year, All-Southern Indiana and Conference and Region Player of the Year honors.

He also was a cum laude honor roll student, competed in basketball and ran track. His teammates included future NBA players Calbert Cheaney, Walter McCarty and also future college coach Chris Lowery.

== College career ==
Hardy accepted a football scholarship from the University of Illinois at Urbana–Champaign. As a redshirt freshman, he had 67 tackles (third on the team), 4 sacks and 7 tackles for loss.

As a sophomore, he started all 11 games at "drop" linebacker. He totaled 78 tackles (fourth on the team), 2 sacks, 8 tackles for loss, 2 passes defensed and one forced fumble.

As a junior, he registered 80 tackles (8 for loss), one sack, 2 interceptions and one pass defensed. During his time at Illinois, the Fighting Illini had a number of outstanding linebackers. In the 1994 season, the four linebackers in coach Lou Tepper's 3–4 defense were Hardy, fellow Butkus Award winner Dana Howard, Simeon Rice and John Holecek. Because of this, Hardy was often overlooked, as he was not prolific in accumulating tackles like Howard, or in quarterback sacks as was Rice, who as a "rush linebacker" played on the line of scrimmage like a defensive end.

As a senior, he was recognized as being among the very best linebackers in college football, winning the Dick Butkus Award and receiving consensus first-team All-American honors. He started every game at "drop" linebacker, finishing with 105 tackles (second on the team), 11 sacks, 15 tackles for loss, 5 forced fumbles, 3 interceptions (tied for the team lead) and 3 passes defensed. He had 18 tackles (13 solo) against Michigan State University. He made 3 sacks against Indiana University.

Hardy finished his career ranked ninth on the Illinois All-time list with 330 tackles, fourth in sacks with 18, and fourth in tackles for loss with 38. He was a business major and was initiated as a member of Omega Psi Phi fraternity.

== Professional football ==
Pre-draft measurables
Height	Weight	Arm length	Hand span	40-yard dash	10-yard split	20-yard split	20-yard shuttle	Vertical jump	Broad jump	Bench press
6 ft 4 3/8 in (1.94 m)	245 lb (111 kg)	32 5/8 in (0.83 m)	9 7/8 in (0.25 m)	4.81 s	1.62 s	2.75 s	4.04 s	32.0 in (0.81 m)	9 ft 11 in (3.02 m)	16 reps

=== Jacksonville Jaguars ===
Hardy was selected by the Jacksonville Jaguars in the first round with the second overall choice in the 1996 NFL draft, signing a six-year $14.8 million contract with a six million dollar signing bonus. Hardy's fellow linebacker at Illinois, Rice, was selected with the third overall choice.

Hardy became the first defensive rookie in franchise history to start on opening day, going on to start 15 games at strongside linebacker. He recorded 130 tackles (second on the team), 5.5 sacks (third in the NFL among rookies), 7 quarterback hurries, 2 interceptions (tied for the team lead), 7 passes defensed, 2 forced fumbles, one fumble recovery and was named to the NFL All-Rookie team.

In 1997, he was limited with injuries, starting 11 out of 13 games at strongside linebacker. He tallied 73 tackles (3 for loss), 2.5 sacks, 5 quarterback hurries and one pass defensed. He suffered a sprained left medial collateral ligament against the Dallas Cowboys, missing 3 contests and seeing limited action in several games the remainder of the season because of the injury. He was able to start the wild card playoff game against the Denver Broncos, collecting 8 tackles.

In 1998, with the signing of free agent Bryce Paup, he was moved to weakside linebacker and started all 16 games. He had a franchise record 186 tackles, while also making 1.5 sacks, 10 quarterback hurries, 2 interceptions, 7 passes defensed, 2 forced fumbles and one fumble recovery. He set a franchise record (for postseason or regular season) with 23 tackles in the Divisional playoff game against the New York Jets, while also having a sack and a forced fumble.

In 1999, Hardy led all AFC linebackers with 10.5 sacks and led the team with 153 tackles. He also had 7 tackles for loss, 24 quarterback hurries, 2 forced fumbles and one fumble recovery, helping the Jaguars achieve a 14-win season. He was named to the AP All-Pro first-team. He joined Carnell Lake ad Tony Brackens as the first Jaguars defensive players named to the Pro Bowl. He had 16 tackles against the Cleveland Browns. He made 13 tackles, 4 quarterback hurries and one forced fumble against the Cincinnati Bengals.

In 2000, he registered 149 tackles (led the team), 3 sacks, 16 quarterback pressures, 6 tackles for loss, one interception, 16 passes defensed, 2 forced fumbles and 2 fumble recoveries. He had 11 tackles and one sack against the New York Giants.

In 2001, he was moved back to strongside linebacker, but injured his knee in the ninth game of the season. At the time he had 98 tackles (second on the team), 5 1/2 sacks (tied for third on the team), 9 quarterback pressures, 4 passes defensed and one fumble recovery. It would be his last game with the Jaguars, who eventually moved him to the injured reserve list, due to needing a microfracture surgery which was thought to be career threatening, because in those days not many players fully recovered from this medical procedure. He left as the franchise's all-time tackles leader, after playing six seasons, which included four trips to the NFL playoffs.

=== Dallas Cowboys ===
On April 14, 2002, the Dallas Cowboys gambled that he could return from the complex surgery and signed him as an unrestricted free agent, counting $2.5 million in his first year and structuring the rest of the $23 million contract with a $5.025 million option in the second year.

Hardy recovered from his injury and played for the Cowboys in the 2002 NFL season, finishing the season ranked third on the team in both total (114) and solo tackles (73), while making 2 sacks, 18 quarterback pressures, 8 tackles for loss, 10 passes defensed and 3 forced fumbles. He played outside linebacker, lining up as a defensive end in some passing downs. Because of salary cap issues, he was released on February 27, 2003, in order to avoid a $5.025 million option bonus.

=== Cincinnati Bengals ===
On March 6, 2003, he signed a four-year, $14 million contract with the Cincinnati Bengals as an unrestricted free agent, to be the Bengals new middle linebacker, after playing outside linebacker in his previous seasons. Hardy was an integral part of the Bengals' defense, starting all 16 games, leading the team in defensive snaps played (1,030 of 1,038 for 99.2%) and was second on the team in tackles (91).

In 2004, he was moved to strongside linebacker after the signing of free agent Nate Webster, starting 14 games and making 84 tackles. The Bengals terminated Hardy's contract in a salary-cap move on May 3, 2005.

Hardy finished his career with 742 tackles (563 solo), 36 sacks, 43.5 tackles for loss, 11 forced fumbles, seven fumble recoveries, 45 pass deflections, five interceptions for 59 yards, and one touchdown in 134 games.

== NFL statistics ==
=== Regular season ===
Year	Team	GP	Tackles				Fumbles		Interceptions					
Year	Team	GP	Comb	Solo	Ast	Sack	FF	FR	Int	Yds	Avg	Lng	TD	PD
1996	JAX	16	84	62	22	5.5	3	1	2	19	9.5	13	0	7
1997	JAX	13	56	48	8	2.5	0	0	0	0	0.0	0	0	1
1998	JAX	16	110	86	24	1.5	1	1	2	40	20.0	24	0	8
1999	JAX	16	97	73	24	10.5	2	1	0	0	0.0	0	0	1
2000	JAX	16	85	73	12	3.0	2	2	1	0	0.0	0	0	6
2001	JAX	9	69	56	13	5.5	0	1	0	0	0.0	0	0	3
2002	DAL	16	75	60	15	2.0	2	0	0	0	0.0	0	0	11
2003	CIN	16	91	58	33	1.5	1	1	0	0	0.0	0	0	4
2004	CIN	16	69	42	27	4.0	0	0	0	0	0.0	0	0	4
Career		134	736	558	178	36.0	11	7	5	59	11.8	24	0	45

=== Postseason ===
Year	Team	GP	Tackles				Fumbles		Interceptions					
Year	Team	GP	Comb	Solo	Ast	Sack	FF	FR	Int	Yds	Avg	Lng	TD	PD
1996	JAX	3	21	19	2	0.0	1	0	0	0	0.0	0	0	0
1997	JAX	1	6	5	1	0.0	0	0	0	0	0.0	0	0	1
1998	JAX	2	26	20	6	1.0	1	0	0	0	0.0	0	0	0
1999	JAX	2	16	11	5	0.0	1	0	0	0	0.0	0	0	1
Career		8	69	55	14	1.0	3	0	0	0	0.0	0	0	2

== Personal life ==
Hardy has two sons, Langston and Camden. As of the start of the 2026 season, both play as defensive linemen for Wake Forest Demon Deacons football.

Hardy is the uncle of NFL running back, Kendall Milton.
