= Rahim Abdullah =

American gridiron football player (born 1976)

No. 54, 55
- Position: Defensive end

Personal information
- Born: March 22, 1976 (age 50); Jacksonville, Florida, U.S. he now lives in Arizona with his family.
- Listed height: 6 ft 5 in (1.96 m)
- Listed weight: 233 lb (106 kg)

Career information
- High school: Duncan U. Fletcher (Neptune Beach, Florida)
- College: Clemson (1995-1998)
- NFL draft: 1999: 2nd round, 45th overall pick

Career history
- Cleveland Browns (1999–2000); Edmonton Eskimos (2002–2004); Calgary Stampeders (2005–2006); Edmonton Eskimos (2007); Grand Rapids Rampage (2008)

Awards and highlights
- 91st Grey Cup champion; Second-team All-ACC (1998)

Career CFL statistics
- Tackles: 138
- Knockdowns: 22
- Sacks: 32
- Fumble recoveries: 3
- Stats at CFL.ca (archived)
- Stats at Pro Football Reference

Rahim Fahim Abdullah (born March 22, 1976) is an American former professional football player in the National Football League (NFL) and Canadian Football League (CFL). He played college football for the Clemson Tigers and was selected by the Cleveland Browns in the second round (45th overall) of the 1999 NFL draft, the year of team's return to the NFL. His brother is Khalid Abdullah, who played linebacker for the Cincinnati Bengals.

In his CFL rookie season in 2002, Abdullah showed tremendous promise in his Eskimo debut (July 4 vs Ottawa) with a team-leading five defensive tackles and one blocked field goal. He recorded two defensive tackles and one sack in Week 3 (July 13 vs Toronto) and continued with a fierce tenure with the team.

He has most recently played for the Edmonton Eskimos of the CFL. He has also played for the Calgary Stampeders. He won the 91st Grey Cup in 2003 with Edmonton.

In 2008, Rahim was a member of the Grand Rapids Rampage of the Arena Football League. He was One of four AFL rookies who started for the Rampage

Abdullah served for a period as the defensive line coach for Dunwoody High School in Atlanta, GA where he currently resides. He founded FS2 Performance in 2010, an athletic training program that supports overall development of aspiring professional athletes.
