= Carl Powell =

American football player (born 1974)

No. 92, 99, 76, 72, 91
- Position: Defensive lineman

Personal information
- Born: January 4, 1974 (age 52); Detroit, Michigan, U.S.
- Listed height: 6 ft 2 in (1.88 m)
- Listed weight: 285 lb (129 kg)

Career information
- High school: Northern (Detroit)
- College: Grand Rapids CC; Louisville
- NFL draft: 1997: 5th round, 156th overall pick

Career history
- Indianapolis Colts (1997–1998); Rhein Fire (1999); Baltimore Ravens (2000); Barcelona Dragons (2000); Rhein Fire (2000); Chicago Bears (2001); Washington Redskins (2002); Cincinnati Bengals (2003–2005)

Awards and highlights
- Super Bowl champion (XXXV)

Career NFL statistics
- Tackles: 111
- Sacks: 6.5
- Forced fumbles: 2
- Stats at Pro Football Reference

Carl Demetris Powell (born January 4, 1974) is an American former professional football player who was a defensive tackle in the National Football League (NFL). He played college football for the Louisville Cardinals.

== Early life and college ==
He played high school football at Kettering High School in Detroit. Later, he played college football at the University of Louisville after transferring from Grand Rapids Community College.

== Professional career ==
He was selected in the 1997 NFL draft by the Indianapolis Colts in the fifth round (156th overall). In 1999, he played for the Rhein Fire in NFL Europa, then was signed by the Baltimore Ravens in the National Football League. Then played with the Chicago Bears, Washington Redskins and Cincinnati Bengals.

== NFL career statistics ==
Legend
**Bold**	Career high

Year	Team	Games		Tackles				Interceptions				Fumbles			
Year	Team	GP	GS	Comb	Solo	Ast	Sck	Int	Yds	TD	Lng	FF	FR	Yds	TD
1997	IND	11	0	3	3	0	0.0	0	0	0	0	0	0	0	0
2000	BAL	2	0	1	1	0	0.0	0	0	0	0	0	0	0	0
2001	CHI	16	0	21	18	3	0.0	0	0	0	0	0	0	0	0
2002	WAS	15	4	**31**	**21**	**10**	**3.0**	0	0	0	0	0	0	0	0
2003	CIN	16	3	20	10	**10**	0.5	0	0	0	0	**1**	**1**	0	0
2004	CIN	10	2	22	16	6	2.0	**1**	-2	0	0	**1**	0	0	0
2005	CIN	11	1	13	9	4	1.0	0	0	0	0	0	0	0	0
		81	10	111	78	33	6.5	1	-2	0	0	2	1	0	0
