= Rogers Beckett =

American football player (born 1977)

Rogers Beckett, Jr.
No. 42, 45
- Position: Safety

Personal information
- Born: January 31, 1977 (age 49); Apopka, Florida, U.S.

Career information
- High school: Apopka
- College: Marshall (1996–1999)
- NFL draft: 2000: 2nd round, 43rd overall pick

Career history
- San Diego Chargers (2000–2002); Cincinnati Bengals (2003–2004)

Awards and highlights
- NCAA I-AA national champion (1996); 2× First-team All-MAC (1998, 1999); Second-team All-MAC (1997)

Career NFL statistics
- Tackles: 290
- Interceptions: 4
- Sacks: 4
- Stats at Pro Football Reference

Rogers D. Beckett Jr. (born January 31, 1977), familiarly 'Red', is an American former professional football player who was a safety in the National Football League (NFL). He went to high school at Apopka High School. He played college football for the Marshall Thundering Herd and was selected in the second round of the 2000 NFL draft with the 43rd overall pick. He played for the San Diego Chargers and the Cincinnati Bengals in his professional football career.

== NFL career statistics ==
Legend
| **Bold** | Career high |

| Year | Team | Games | | Tackles | | | | | Interceptions | | | | | Fumbles | | | |
| Year | Team | GP | GS | Cmb | Solo | Ast | Sck | TFL | Int | Yds | TD | Lng | PD | FF | FR | Yds | TD |
|---|---|---|---|---|---|---|---|---|---|---|---|---|---|---|---|---|---|
| 2000 | SDG | **16** | 3 | 49 | 38 | 11 | 1.0 | 1 | 1 | 7 | 0 | 7 | 2 | 0 | 0 | 0 | 0 |
| 2001 | SDG | **16** | **16** | **100** | **79** | **21** | 0.0 | 1 | 1 | 8 | 0 | 8 | **5** | **2** | **1** | **1** | 0 |
| 2002 | SDG | **16** | 10 | 39 | 37 | 2 | 0.0 | 0 | 0 | 0 | 0 | 0 | 2 | 0 | 0 | 0 | 0 |
| 2003 | CIN | **16** | 9 | 83 | 62 | **21** | **3.0** | **5** | **2** | **11** | 0 | **11** | **5** | **2** | 0 | 0 | 0 |
| 2004 | CIN | 7 | 5 | 19 | 14 | 5 | 0.0 | 1 | 0 | 0 | 0 | 0 | 1 | 0 | 0 | 0 | 0 |
| Career | | 71 | 43 | 290 | 230 | 60 | 4.0 | 8 | 4 | 26 | 0 | 11 | 15 | 4 | 1 | 1 | 0 |
