= Greg Brooks (American football) =

American football player (born 1980)

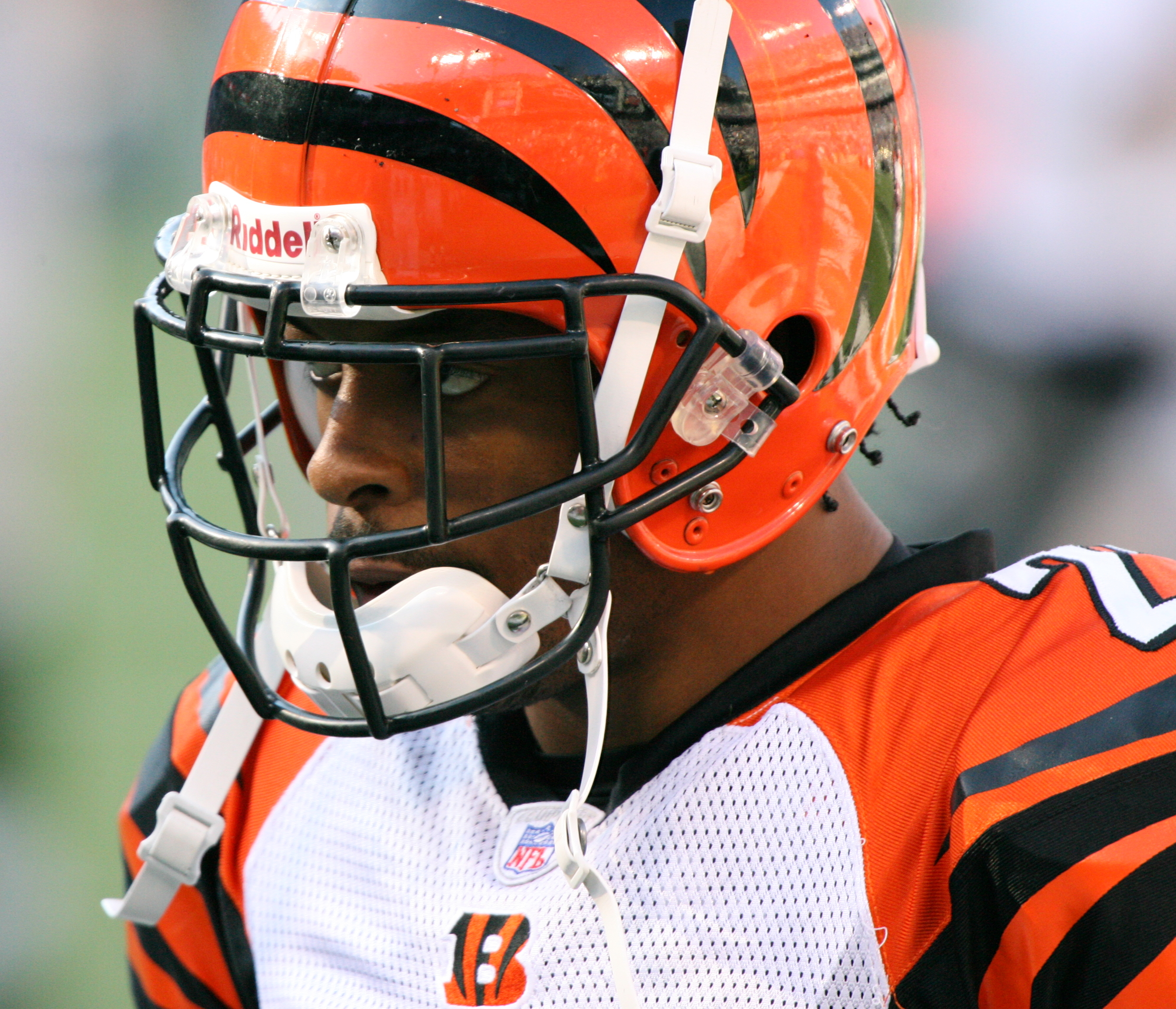
- Brooks with the Cincinnati Bengals in 2006

No. 27
- Position: Defensive back

Personal information
- Born: December 16, 1980 (age 45); New Orleans, Louisiana, U.S.
- Listed height: 5 ft 11 in (1.80 m)
- Listed weight: 182 lb (83 kg)

Career information
- High school: Archbishop Shaw (Marrero, Louisiana)
- College: Southern Miss
- NFL draft: 2004: 6th round, 183rd overall pick

Career history
- Cincinnati Bengals (2004–2006)

Career NFL statistics
- Total tackles: 9
- Stats at Pro Football Reference

Greg Brooks (born December 16, 1980) is an American former professional football player who was a cornerback for the Cincinnati Bengals of the National Football League (NFL). He played college football for the Southern Miss Golden Eagles and was selected by the Bengals in the sixth round of the 2004 NFL draft with the 183rd overall pick.

Brooks played high school football at Archbishop Shaw High School in Marrero, Louisiana.
