= Terrell Roberts =

American football player (1981–2019)

- Roberts with the Cincinnati Bengals

No. 30
- Position: Cornerback

Personal information
- Born: April 7, 1981; Berkeley, California, U.S.
- Died: September 11, 2019 (aged 38); Richmond, California, U.S.
- Listed height: 5 ft 10 in (1.78 m)
- Listed weight: 197 lb (89 kg)

Career information
- High school: El Cerrito (El Cerrito, California)
- College: Oregon State (1999–2002)
- NFL draft: 2003: undrafted

Career history
- Cincinnati Bengals (2003–2005)

Awards and highlights
- Second-team All-Pac-10 (2002)

Career NFL statistics
- Total tackles: 30
- Sacks: 1
- Forced fumbles: 1
- Pass deflections: 3
- Interceptions: 1
- Stats at Pro Football Reference

Terrell Maiza Roberts (April 7, 1981 – September 11, 2019) was an American professional football cornerback who played two seasons with the Cincinnati Bengals of the National Football League (NFL). He played college football at Oregon State University.

== Early life and college ==
Terrell Maiza Roberts was born on April 7, 1981, in Berkeley, California. He attended El Cerrito High School in El Cerrito, California.

Roberts was a four-year letterman for the Oregon State Beavers of Oregon State University from 1999 to 2002.

== Professional career ==
Roberts was signed by the Cincinnati Bengals on May 2, 2003 after going undrafted in the 2003 NFL draft. He played in 12 games for the Bengals in 2003, recording 17 solo tackles, three assisted tackles, one sack, one forced fumble, one interception and one pass breakup. He also returned seven kicks for 128 yards. Roberts appeared in 11 games, starting one, during the 2004 season, totaling nine solo tackles, one assisted tackle and two pass breakups.

He was waived/injured on August 30, 2005 and reverted to injured reserve the next day. He was waived by the Bengals on October 4, 2005.

== Death ==
Roberts was fatally shot while visiting his grandmother in Richmond, California, on September 11, 2019.
