= Belton Johnson =

American gridiron football player (born 1980)

No. 54
- Position: Offensive tackle

Personal information
- Born: July 23, 1980 (age 46); Coffeeville, Mississippi, U.S.
- Listed height: 6 ft 6 in (1.98 m)
- Listed weight: 304 lb (138 kg)

Career information
- College: Mississippi

Career history
- 2003–2004: Cincinnati Bengals
- 2006: Winnipeg Blue Bombers*
- 2006–2009: Saskatchewan Roughriders
- 2009–2012: Hamilton Tiger-Cats
- 2012: Edmonton Eskimos
- * Offseason or practice squad member only
- Stats at CFL.ca

Belton Johnson (born July 23, 1980) is an American former professional football offensive tackle. He was signed by the Cincinnati Bengals as an undrafted free agent in 2003. He played college football at Mississippi.

Johnson was also a member of the BC Lions, Winnipeg Blue Bombers, Saskatchewan Roughriders, Hamilton Tiger-Cats and Edmonton Eskimos. He is the older brother of NFL offensive lineman Marcus Johnson.
