= Greg Scott (American football) =

American football player (born 1979)

No. 96, 93
- Position: Defensive end

Personal information
- Born: October 2, 1979 (age 47); Franklin, Virginia, U.S.
- Listed height: 6 ft 4 in (1.93 m)
- Listed weight: 293 lb (133 kg)

Career information
- High school: Courtland (VA) Southampton
- College: Hampton
- NFL draft: 2002: 7th round, 234th overall pick

Career history
- Washington Redskins (2002); Cincinnati Bengals (2003–2004); Rhein Fire (2005); Grand Rapids Rampage (2006–2007)

Career NFL statistics
- Games played: 4
- Games started: 0
- Tackles: 0
- Sacks: 0
- Passes deflected: 0
- Stats at Pro Football Reference

Career AFL statistics
- Tackles: 9
- Passes deflected: 2
- Stats at ArenaFan.com

Gregory Scott (born October 2, 1979) is an American former professional football player who was a defensive end in the National Football League (NFL), NFL Europe, and Arena Football League (AFL).

He played college football for the Hampton Pirates and was selected in the seventh round of the 2002 NFL draft. He played for the Washington Redskins (2002) and the Cincinnati Bengals (2003–2004). In 2005, he was allocated to the Rhein Fire of NFLE. He played two seasons for the AFL's Grand Rapids Rampage (2006–2007).
