= Marvin Lewis =

American football coach (born 1958)

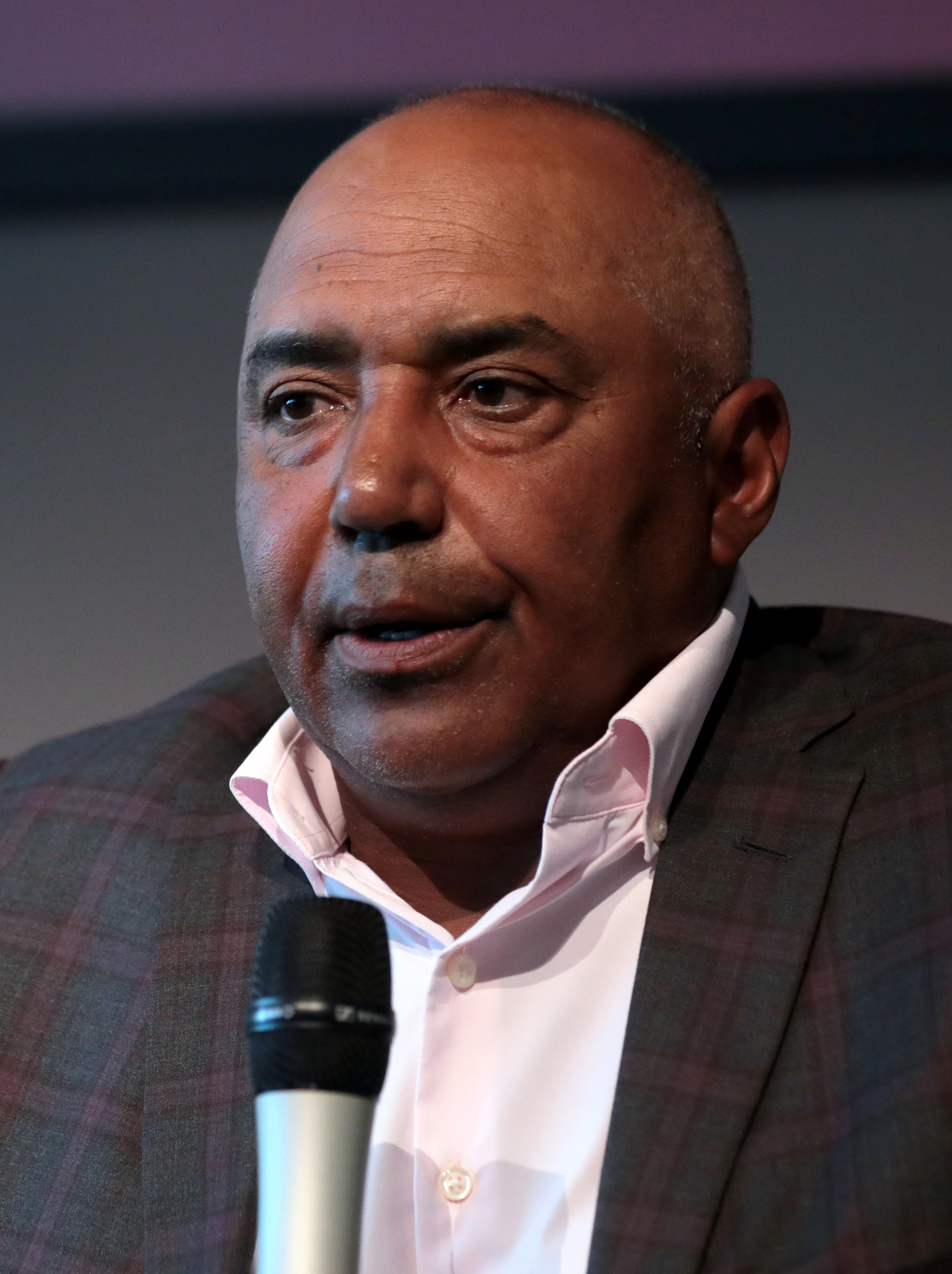
- Lewis in 2022

Personal information
- Born: September 23, 1958 (age 68); McDonald, Pennsylvania, U.S.

Career information
- Position: Linebacker
- High school: Fort Cherry (McDonald)
- College: Idaho State (1977–1980)

Career history
- Idaho State (1981–1984) Linebackers coach; Long Beach State (1985–1986) Linebackers coach; New Mexico (1987–1989) Linebackers coach; Pittsburgh (1990–1991) Linebackers coach; Pittsburgh Steelers (1992–1995) Linebackers coach; Baltimore Ravens (1996–2001) Defensive coordinator; Washington Redskins (2002) Assistant head coach & defensive coordinator; Cincinnati Bengals (2003–2018) Head coach; Arizona State (2019–2023); Special advisor (2019); Co-defensive coordinator (2020); Special advisor (2021–2023); Las Vegas Raiders (2024) Assistant head coach

Awards and highlights
- As head coach: AP NFL Coach of the Year (2009); As assistant coach: Super Bowl champion (XXXV); NCAA FCS national champion (1981)

Head coaching record
- Regular season: 131–122–3 (.518)
- Postseason: 0–7 (.000)
- Career: 131–129–3 (.504)
- Coaching profile at Pro Football Reference

Marvin Roland Lewis Jr. (born September 23, 1958) is an American professional football coach who served as the head coach for the Cincinnati Bengals of the National Football League (NFL) for 16 seasons. He came to prominence as the defensive coordinator of the Baltimore Ravens from 1996 to 2001, whose defense in 2000 set the record for the fewest points allowed in a 16-game season and led the franchise to their first Super Bowl title in Super Bowl XXXV. Following his Baltimore tenure, Lewis was named the Bengals' head coach, where he served from 2003 to 2018.

Lewis' head coaching tenure oversaw improved fortunes for the struggling Bengals and helped transform the team into postseason contenders. At the time Lewis was hired, the Bengals had not had a winning season or postseason appearance since 1990 and finished with a franchise-worst 2–14 record. By his third season, Lewis ended both droughts and led the Bengals to their first division title in 15 years. He guided the Bengals to seven playoff appearances and four division titles, along with a franchise-best five consecutive postseason appearances from 2011 to 2015. Lewis became the franchise's winningest head coach and was named AP NFL Coach of the Year in 2009, making him the first Bengals coach to receive the honor since team founder Paul Brown in 1970.

While credited with returning the Bengals to respectability, Lewis' reputation was affected by a lack of postseason success as he was unable to lead the team to a playoff victory. His 131 regular season victories, 16 years as a head coach, and seven postseason losses are the most of NFL head coaches who have not won a playoff game.

== Early life ==
Marvin Ronald Lewis Jr. was born on September 23, 1958, in McDonald, Pennsylvania, a small town about 20 mi (32 km) west of Pittsburgh. He started playing football at age nine and played safety and quarterback for his team at Fort Cherry High School. Lewis was on the wrestling team and played baseball in the summers.

Lewis initially decided to walk on as a football player at Purdue University in West Lafayette, Indiana, but then received a scholarship to attend Idaho State University in Pocatello. He primarily was a linebacker. In 2001, Lewis was inducted into Idaho State University's Sports Hall of Fame. He was named Idaho State Alumni of the Year in 2012. Lewis received both a bachelor's degree in physical education and a master's degree in athletic administration from Idaho State.

== Coaching career ==
=== College ===
Lewis began his coaching career as a graduate assistant at Idaho State before becoming the team's linebackers coach for four seasons (1981–1984). Idaho State won the NCAA Division I-AA Championship during his first year with the team.

Lewis was an assistant coach at Long Beach State University (1985–1986), the University of New Mexico (1987–1989), and the University of Pittsburgh (1990–1992).

=== National Football League ===
==== Assistant coach ====
Lewis had coaching internships with the Kansas City Chiefs and the San Francisco 49ers before being hired as the linebackers coach for the Pittsburgh Steelers in 1992. He was a member of the Steelers' staff when the team lost Super Bowl XXX to the Dallas Cowboys.

The newly relocated Baltimore Ravens (formerly the Cleveland Browns), hired Lewis as their defensive coordinator in 1996, a position that he held for six seasons until 2001. On January 28, 2001, the Ravens defeated the New York Giants 34–7 in Super Bowl XXXV thanks largely to a defense that allowed the fewest rushing yards (970) and the fewest points (165) in a 16-game regular season. "If ever a man proved his worth as a future head coach, Marvin Lewis did it with this complete domination of the Giants in their 16 possessions: Punt, punt, punt, punt, punt, punt, interception, punt, interception, interception, punt, interception, punt, punt, punt, end of game", wrote Sports Illustrated writer Michael Silver after the game.

Lewis was a prime candidate for several NFL head coaching jobs but was passed over each time. Most notably, he nearly became head coach of the Tampa Bay Buccaneers in 2002. General manager Rich McKay was ready to formally offer the job to Lewis, and the Ravens actually held a going-away party for him. However, the team's owners, the Glazer family, were unwilling to give the job to another defense-minded coach after firing Tony Dungy. Lewis was also a prime candidate for the Buffalo Bills coaching vacancy, but was passed over in favor of Tennessee Titans defensive coordinator Gregg Williams. Shortly afterward, Lewis was hired by the Washington Redskins as defensive coordinator and assistant head coach under Steve Spurrier.

==== Head coach ====
===== 2003–2005 =====
Lewis became the ninth coach in Cincinnati Bengals history on January 14, 2003, when he was hired to replace Dick LeBeau, who was fired after the worst season in franchise history in terms of win percentage, edging out Tom Coughlin and Mike Mularkey. Lewis also had interviews with the Buffalo Bills, the Carolina Panthers, Tampa Bay Buccaneers, and the Cleveland Browns. Lewis also declined head coaching positions in the college ranks with the University of California, Berkeley and Michigan State University to continue pursuing his goal of becoming a head coach in the NFL.

A contending team in the mid-late 1970s through the 1980s, the Bengals had fallen on hard times in the 1990s and had had several head coaches. However, Lewis didn't take long to return the Bengals to respectability with a nucleus of young players such as quarterback Carson Palmer, running back Rudi Johnson, receivers Chad Johnson and T. J. Houshmandzadeh, and defensive backs Tory James and Deltha O'Neal. After consecutive 8–8 seasons in 2003 and 2004, Lewis led the Bengals to an 11–5 record in 2005, their first winning season, first division title, and first playoff berth since 1990. However, the Bengals lost in the first round to their rival and eventual Super Bowl XL champion Pittsburgh Steelers with Steelers' Kimo von Oelhoffen rolling into Carson Palmer's leg, forcing Palmer out of the game and requiring reconstructive surgery during the off season, as well as inspiring the "Carson Palmer Rule" change protecting quarterbacks looking to throw with both feet on the ground.

===== 2006–2010 =====
The Bengals dropped to 8–8 in 2006, a disappointing season in which they started out 8–5 and then lost their last three games of the season, any one of which could have gotten them into the playoffs with a win. Then they recorded two consecutive losing seasons, going 7–9 in 2007 and going 4–11–1 in 2008. But in 2009, Cincinnati recorded their second winning season under Lewis' tenure. This included wins in all six games against their AFC North opponents, marking the first time in franchise history they accomplished this feat. The Bengals finished the season 10–6, winning the AFC North title and earning only their second trip to the playoffs in 19 years. On January 9, 2010, The Bengals were defeated by the New York Jets 24–14 in the opening round of the playoffs. On January 16, 2010, Lewis was named the Associated Press 2009 NFL coach of the year, after the Bengals improved from a 4–11–1 record in 2008 to a 10–6 regular season record in 2009.

The Bengals slipped to a 4–12 record in 2010, the worst record of Lewis' Bengals coaching tenure and the first time that the team finished last in the AFC North with Lewis as their head coach.

===== 2011–2015 =====
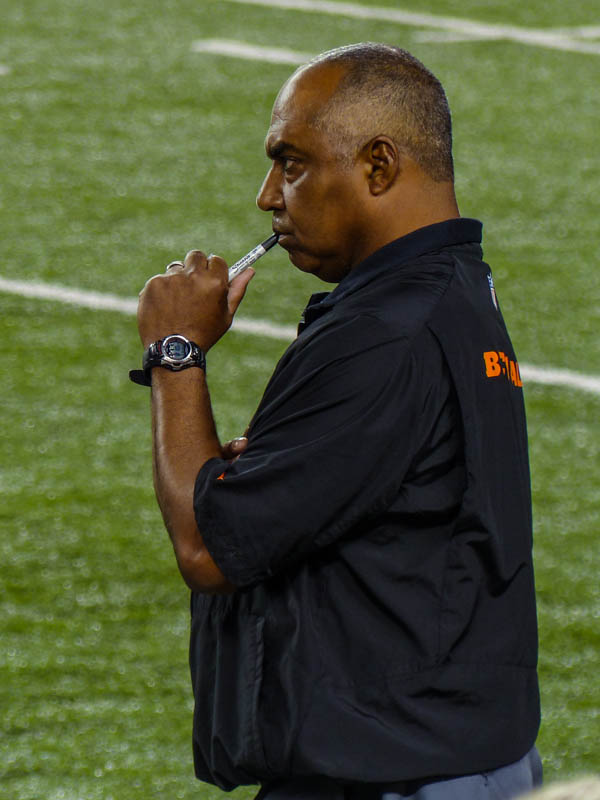
Lewis in 2013

On January 4, 2011, Lewis signed an extension with the Bengals. The off-season leading up to 2011 was a difficult time for the Bengals. The team lost three of their most productive players from the 2010 season, receivers Terrell Owens and Chad Ochocinco along with defensive back Johnathan Joseph, while quarterback Carson Palmer, the team's starter since 2004, refused to play for the Bengals moving forward, leading to him being traded midway through the season.

However, with the aid of strong play from their first and second-round draft picks, receiver A. J. Green and quarterback Andy Dalton, the Bengals still managed to record their third winning season. Midway through 2011, Lewis won his 65th game with the Bengals, surpassing Sam Wyche as the winningest coach in Bengals history. By the halfway mark, the Bengals' record was 6–2, including a five-game winning streak. It was the first time the Bengals had won five consecutive games since 1988, when the team advanced to Super Bowl XXIII with Wyche as their coach. They finished the season 9–7 and made the playoffs as the #6 seed, where the Bengals lost to the Houston Texans in the wild card round.

On July 31, 2012, the Bengals gave Lewis a two-year contract extension through 2014. Cincinnati started 2012 with a 44–13 loss to the eventual Super Bowl XLVII champion Baltimore Ravens, the most lopsided opening day defeat in franchise history. But the team recovered and won their next three games. After defeating the Pittsburgh Steelers in week 16, the Bengals again clinched the #6 seed in the AFC and eliminated the Steelers from playoff contention. This marked the first time the Bengals made the playoffs in consecutive seasons since 1982, ending the longest streak of failure to make consecutive playoff appearances among all 32 NFL teams. Cincinnati finished the season with a 10–6 record, including a franchise record 51 quarterback sacks. However, the season again concluded with a loss in the wild card round handed to them by the Houston Texans.

The 2013 season was one of the most successful in Lewis's career as head coach. Cincinnati finished with an 11–5 record and won their third division title since 2005 and finished undefeated at home for the first time since 1988. However, they were upset in the first round of the playoffs by the 9–7 San Diego Chargers, a team they had beaten earlier in the season 17–10. It was the third consecutive season that ended in a wild card round playoff loss for Cincinnati.

By 2014, Lewis acquired considerable authority over football operations. Owner Mike Brown was still reckoned as the team's de facto general manager and retains the final say on football matters, but ceded most authority over day-to-day personnel matters to Lewis.

In 2014, Lewis became the 37th coach in NFL history to record 100 regular season wins. The Bengals continued their playoff streak, posting a 10–5–1 record. They held the fifth seed in the AFC playoffs and drew the 11–5 Indianapolis Colts as their first-round opponent. In week 7, the Bengals had been shut out 27–0 in Indianapolis. They lost again 26–10, being outscored 16–0 in the second half after being tied at halftime. With the Bengals' defeat, Lewis tied Jim E. Mora for the most postseason losses as a head coach without a win. There was some speculation that Lewis's head coaching job was on thin ice after a fourth consecutive first-round playoff exit, but on April 22, 2015, Lewis signed an extension with the Bengals through 2016.

Cincinnati started out the 2015 season with an 8–0 record, the best start in franchise history. The team finished the year 12–4, the best record of Lewis' head coaching tenure and marking only the third time the Bengals had ever recorded 12 wins. However, the team was eliminated in a first-round wild card game for the fifth straight year, this time against their divisional rivals, the Pittsburgh Steelers. Leading 16–15 near the end of the fourth quarter, Lewis faced criticism for not keeping his players under control after penalties drawn by Vontaze Burfict and Adam Jones moved the Steelers into field goal range and allowed them to make a game-winning kick with eighteen seconds remaining. The defeat made Lewis the first NFL coach to lose seven postseason games without any wins and the Bengals the first NFL team to lose five straight playoff games in the opening round.

===== 2016–2018 =====
The 2016 and 2017 seasons marked a noted decline for the Bengals, who finished 6–9–1 in the former and 7–9 in the latter to fail to qualify the postseason for two consecutive seasons. The seasons marked Lewis' first losing records with the team since 2010 and first consecutive losing years since 2008, as well as the first losing seasons and missed playoff appearances after the acquisitions of quarterback Andy Dalton and wide receiver A. J. Green.

The losing seasons, combined with Lewis' winless playoff record and previous five consecutive first-round eliminations led to speculation towards his future in Cincinnati and the potential end of his coaching tenure. This speculation was fueled by a report during the 2017 season that said Lewis was planning to leave the Bengals after his contract expired at the end of the season to pursue other opportunities. Following the conclusion of the 2017 regular season, the report was disproved when Lewis signed a two-year contract extension. The extension was met with criticism from the media and Bengals fans due to his 0–7 playoff record and only winning 13 out of 32 games in the previous two seasons.

Despite the criticism towards Lewis' return, the Bengals had a strong start in 2018, leading the AFC North with a 4–1 record by Week 5 and holding a 5–3 record before their bye week. After the bye, the team suffered a collapse and lost five consecutive games. During the losing streak, Lewis assumed control of the defense when defensive coordinator Teryl Austin was fired. Afflicted by season-ending injuries to several players and a struggling defense that ranked last in yards allowed, the Bengals finished the year with a 6–10 record to place at the bottom of their division. The season marked the first time since 2008 that the team failed to qualify for the playoffs in three consecutive years and the first time that Lewis had three consecutive seasons with sub-.500 records.

With a year left on his contract, Lewis and the Bengals announced that they had mutually parted ways following the conclusion of the 2018 season. Lewis finished as the first Bengals head coach to leave the team with an overall winning record since Forrest Gregg in 1984.

=== Return to college ===
Lewis was hired as a special advisor at Arizona State University on May 28, 2019. On February 4, 2020, he was promoted to co-defensive coordinator alongside Antonio Pierce.

=== Return to the NFL ===
On February 1, 2024, Lewis was announced as the assistant head coach of the Las Vegas Raiders under Antonio Pierce after informally advising Pierce after he became the interim head coach of the Raiders in 2023.

== Head coaching record ==
Team		Regular season					Postseason			
Team	Year	Won	Lost	Ties	Win %	Finish	Won	Lost	Win %	Result
CIN	2003	8	8	0	.500	2nd in AFC North	–	–	–	
CIN	2004	8	8	0	.500	3rd in AFC North	–	–	–	–
CIN	2005	11	5	0	.688	1st in AFC North	0	1	.000	Lost to Pittsburgh Steelers in AFC Wild Card Game
CIN	2006	8	8	0	.500	2nd in AFC North	–	–	–	–
CIN	2007	7	9	0	.438	3rd in AFC North	–	–	–	–
CIN	2008	4	11	1	.281	3rd in AFC North	–	–	–	–
CIN	2009	10	6	0	.625	1st in AFC North	0	1	.000	Lost to New York Jets in AFC Wild Card Game
CIN	2010	4	12	0	.250	4th in AFC North	–	–	–	–
CIN	2011	9	7	0	.563	3rd in AFC North	0	1	.000	Lost to Houston Texans in AFC Wild Card Game
CIN	2012	10	6	0	.625	2nd in AFC North	0	1	.000	Lost to Houston Texans in AFC Wild Card Game
CIN	2013	11	5	0	.688	1st in AFC North	0	1	.000	Lost to San Diego Chargers in AFC Wild Card Game
CIN	2014	10	5	1	.656	2nd in AFC North	0	1	.000	Lost to Indianapolis Colts in AFC Wild Card Game
CIN	2015	12	4	0	.750	1st in AFC North	0	1	.000	Lost to Pittsburgh Steelers in AFC Wild Card Game
CIN	2016	6	9	1	.406	3rd in AFC North	–	–	–	–
CIN	2017	7	9	0	.438	3rd in AFC North	–	–	–	–
CIN	2018	6	10	0	.375	4th in AFC North	–	–	–	–
Total		131	122	3	.518		0	7	.000	–

== Broadcasting career ==
After his departure from the Bengals, Lewis was hired as a game and studio analyst for Turner Sports's coverage of the Alliance of American Football (AAF).

== Personal life ==
Lewis is married and has a daughter and a son. His son, Marcus, is the running backs coach at Hampton University after serving as the Bengals' defensive line and quality control coach.
