= Khalid Abdullah (linebacker) =

American gridiron football player (born 1979)

No. 43, 53
- Position: Linebacker

Personal information
- Born: March 6, 1979 (age 47); Jacksonville, Florida, U.S.
- Listed height: 6 ft 2 in (1.88 m)
- Listed weight: 227 lb (103 kg)

Career information
- High school: Fletcher (Neptune Beach, Florida)
- College: Mars Hill (1999-2002)
- NFL draft: 2003: 5th round, 136th overall pick

Career history
- Cincinnati Bengals (2003–2005); Calgary Stampeders (2006); Montreal Alouettes (2007)

Career NFL statistics
- Tackles: 10
- Stats at Pro Football Reference

Career CFL statistics
- Tackles: 66

Khalid U. Abdullah (born March 6, 1979) is an American former professional football player. His brother is Rahim Abdullah, who played linebacker for the Cleveland Browns. He was selected in the fifth round of the 2003 NFL draft with the 136th overall pick. He played in 12 regular season games for the Calgary Stampeders of the Canadian Football League (CFL) in the 2006 CFL season but was a pre-season cut in 2007. He eventually signed with the Montreal Alouettes on October 5, 2007, and played in four regular season games.
