= Alex Sulfsted =

American football player (born 1977)

No. 75, 62
- Position: Tackle / Guard

Personal information
- Born: December 21, 1977 (age 48); Lebanon, Ohio, U.S.

Career information
- High school: Mariemont (Mariemont, Ohio)
- College: Miami (OH)
- NFL draft: 2001: 6th round, 176th overall pick

Career history
- Kansas City Chiefs (2001)*; Cincinnati Bengals (2001)*; Washington Redskins (2001–2002); Cincinnati Bengals (2003–2004)
- * Offseason or practice squad member only

Awards and highlights
- Second-team All-MAC (2000)

Career NFL statistics
- Games played: 18
- Games started: 3
- Stats at Pro Football Reference

Alex Frederick Sulfsted (born December 21, 1977) is an American former professional football player who was an offensive lineman in the National Football League (NFL) for the Washington Redskins and Cincinnati Bengals. He played college football for the Miami RedHawks and was selected by the Kansas City Chiefs in the sixth round of the 2001 NFL draft. Sulfsted retired from the NFL to pursue a career in real estate.

Sulfsted married Meggan Yeager in May 2006.
