= Reggie Kelly =

American football player (born 1977)

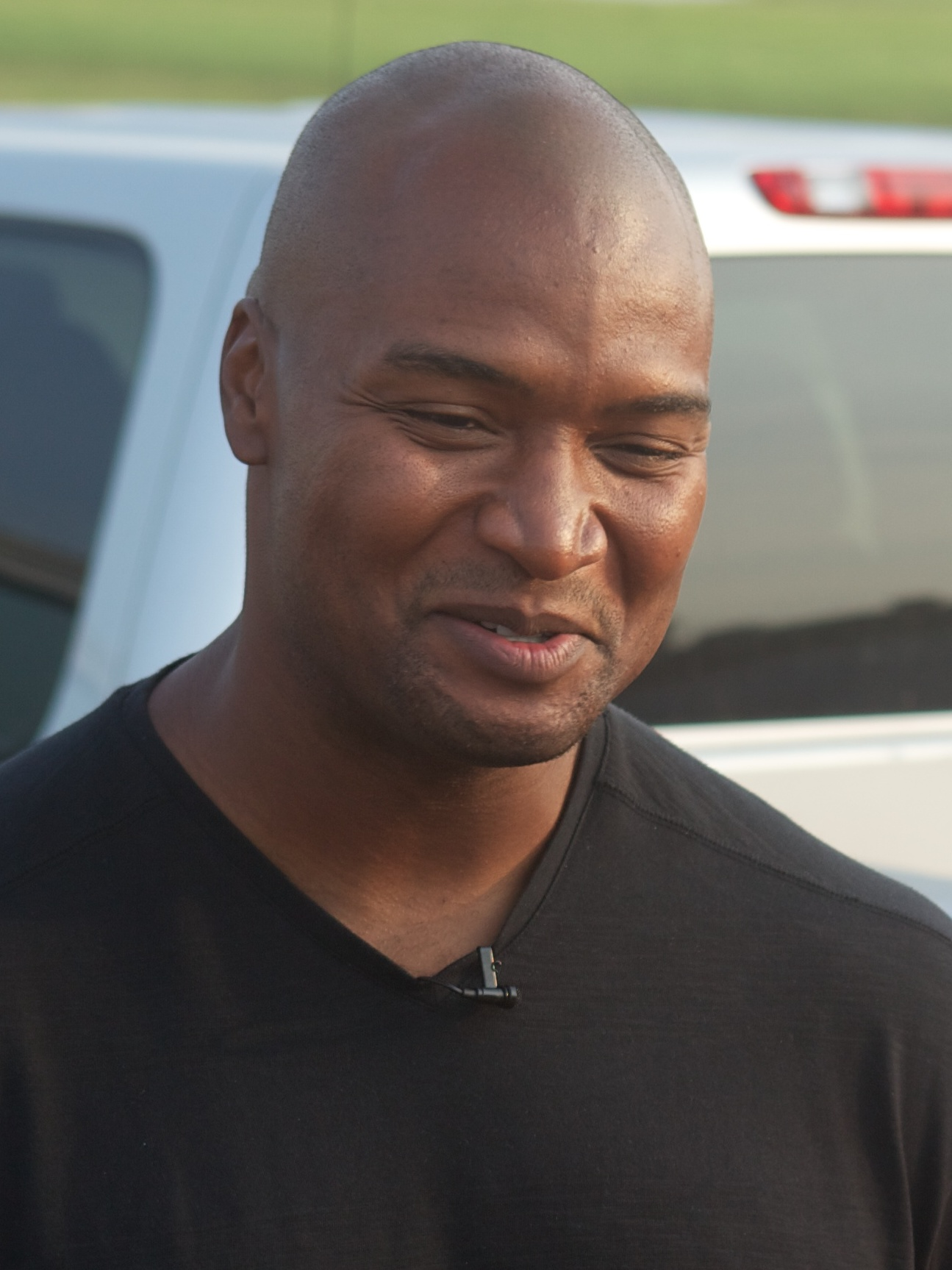
- Kelly in 2011

No. 82, 89
- Position: Tight end

Personal information
- Born: February 22, 1977 (age 49); Aberdeen, Mississippi, U.S.
- Listed height: 6 ft 4 in (1.93 m)
- Listed weight: 257 lb (117 kg)

Career information
- High school: Aberdeen
- College: Mississippi State
- NFL draft: 1999: 2nd round, 42nd overall pick

Career history
- Atlanta Falcons (1999–2002); Cincinnati Bengals (2003–2010); Atlanta Falcons (2011)

Awards and highlights
- First-team All-SEC (1998)

Career NFL statistics
- Receptions: 195
- Receiving yards: 1,767
- Receiving touchdowns: 5
- Stats at Pro Football Reference

Reginald Kuta Kelly (born February 22, 1977) is an American former professional football player who was a tight end in the National Football League (NFL). He played college football for the Mississippi State Bulldogs. and was selected by the Atlanta Falcons in the second round of the 1999 NFL draft. He played the majority of his NFL career for the Cincinnati Bengals.

== College career ==
Kelly attended Mississippi State University. He played 44 times for his college and made 22 starts. He graduated with a degree in industrial technology.

Kelly had a strong senior year at Mississippi State in 1998, earning First-team All-SEC, as he helped the Bulldogs win the SEC West Division title, earning a spot in the 1998 SEC Championship Game. After the Conference Championship, Kelly finished his college career playing in a New Years Day Bowl at the 1999 Cotton Bowl Classic.

== Professional career ==
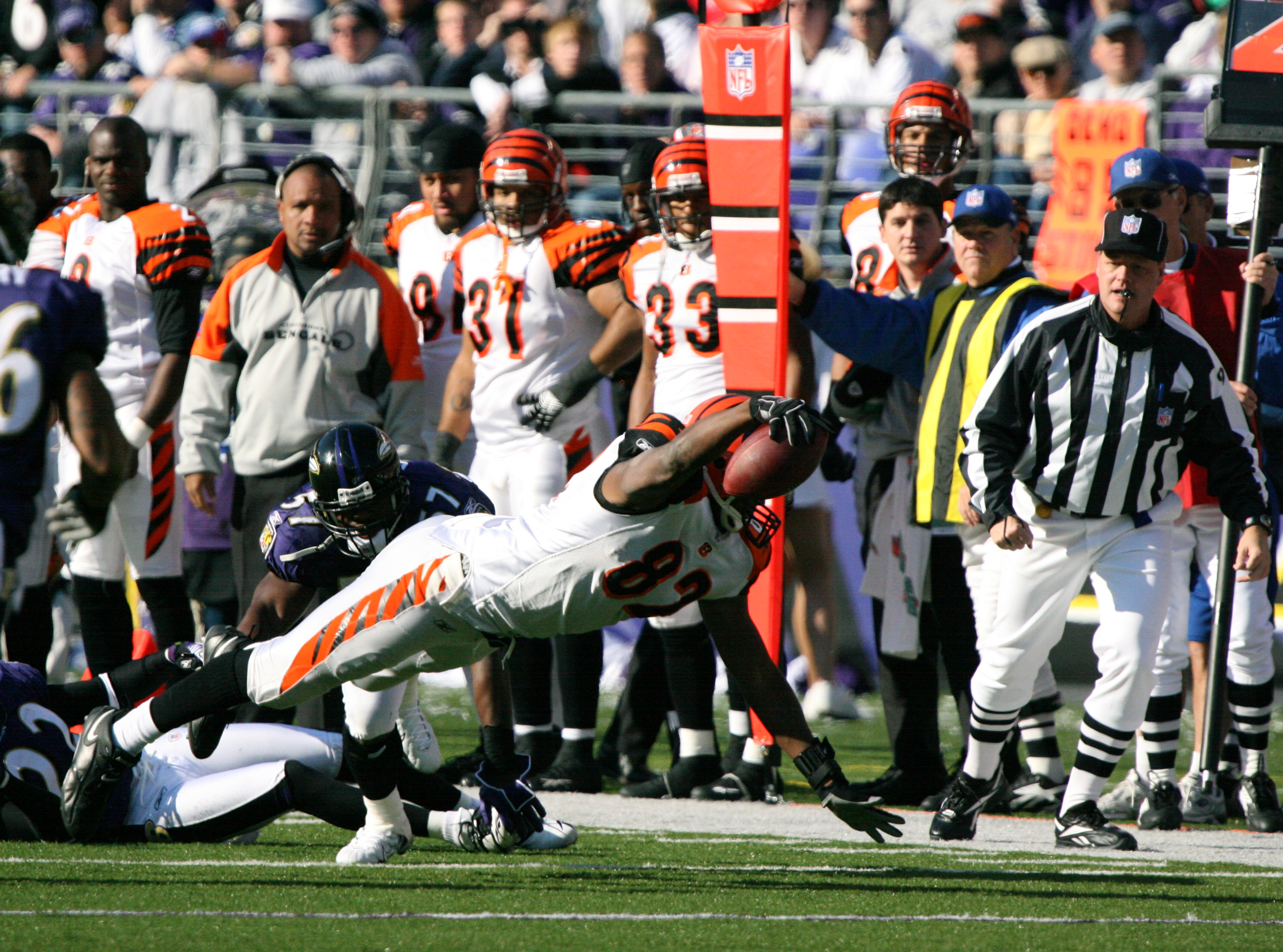
Kelly diving in 2006.

=== Atlanta Falcons ===
Kelly was drafted by the Atlanta Falcons in the second round (42nd overall) of the 1999 NFL draft. He made his first NFL start versus the New Orleans Saints on December 5. In his first season, he played in every game.

In the 2000 season he started in every game and caught his first NFL touchdown pass versus the St. Louis Rams on September 24. He finished the season with 31 catches for 340 yards and two touchdowns. During the 2001 season he made 13 starts and finished the season with 16 catches for 142 yards. In the 2002 season he started every game in the regular season as Atlanta progressed to the Divisional playoffs. He finished the season with 14 catches for 162 yards.

=== Cincinnati Bengals ===
On March 13, 2003, Kelly signed with the Cincinnati Bengals as an unrestricted free agent. He played in 12 games making 13 catches for 81 yards and one touchdown.

During the 2004 season, Kelly played in every game for the Bengals with 15 starts and made 15 catches for 85 yards.

In 2007, Kelly won the Ed Block Courage Award. This is an annual award presented to a player from each team in the National Football League (NFL) who are voted for by their teammates as role models of inspiration, sportsmanship, and courage.

During a morning practice session on August 3, 2009, Kelly suffered a ruptured left Achilles. He was placed on injured reserve two days later.

On May 13, 2010, Kelly re-signed with the Bengals.

=== Return to Atlanta ===
Kelly returned to the Atlanta Falcons on August 16, 2011, after signing a contract with them.
