= Ricot Joseph =

Haitian gridiron football player (born 1978)

No. 35
- Position: Safety

Personal information
- Born: June 16, 1978 (age 48); Haiti
- Listed height: 6 ft 0 in (1.83 m)
- Listed weight: 185 lb (84 kg)

Career information
- High school: Lake Worth Community (Lake Worth Beach, Florida)
- College: UCF (1997–2001)
- NFL draft: 2002: undrafted

Career history
- Washington Redskins (2002); Cincinnati Bengals (2003–2004)

Career NFL statistics
- Games played: 6
- Total tackles: 4
- Forced fumbles: 1
- Stats at Pro Football Reference

Ricot Joseph (born June 16, 1978) is a Haitian-American former professional football player who was a safety for one season in the National Football League (NFL) for the Washington Redskins. Born in Haiti, Joseph was raised in Lake Worth Beach, Florida, and played college football for the UCF Golden Knights. He joined the Redskins as an undrafted free agent in 2002 and appeared in six games that year. He was released by Washington prior to the 2003 season and later signed with the Cincinnati Bengals, spending two seasons with them but seeing no playing time.

== Early life ==
Joseph was born on June 16, 1978, in Haiti. He was raised in Lake Worth Beach, Florida. He attended Lake Worth Community High School where he lettered in three sports: football, basketball and track and field. In football, he played as a wide receiver. After high school, he had a scholarship offer to play college football for the Alcorn State Braves, but opted to walk-on at the University of Central Florida (UCF), to play for the UCF Golden Knights.

== College career ==
Joseph redshirted as a freshman at UCF in 1997, being a member of the scout team. He saw limited action as a sophomore in 1998 in several home games, not being a member of the travel team. In 1999, he won a starting job at free safety. He appeared in 10 games, recording 35 tackles, two tackles-for-loss (TFLs), a sack and two interceptions. Joseph also blocked three punts, setting a program record, and returned a blocked punt for a touchdown against Bowling Green. He was named the UCF Special Teams MVP and the UCF Most Improved Defensive Player for his performance. Following the season, he was awarded a scholarship.

In 2000, Joseph remained the starting free safety, totaling 74 tackles, two interceptions, seven pass breakups and a blocked punt in nine starts. In his senior year, 2001, he started all 11 games and was second on the team with 104 tackles, also recording two TFLs, a sack, six pass breakups, two forced fumbles and one blocked kick. A physical education major with a 3.6 grade-point average (GPA), he was also named to the 2001 Verizon Academic All-District III team and was a nominee for the Academic All-America team. At the end of his collegiate career, he was invited to the Rotary Gridiron Classic all-star game.

== Professional career ==
In a workout in front of NFL scouts, prior to the 2002 NFL draft, Joseph ran a 40-yard dash timed at 4.38 seconds. After going unselected in the draft, he signed with the Washington Redskins as an undrafted free agent on April 24, 2002. He was released by the Redskins on September 1, then re-signed to the practice squad the following day. Following an injury to Sam Shade, Joseph was signed to the active roster on November 19. He made his NFL debut five days later, posting one tackle in a 20–17 win over the St. Louis Rams. He became the first Haitian-born NFL player. Joseph also appeared in the team's next five games, finishing the season with a total of four tackles, three solo and one assisted. He additionally forced one fumble, in the team's Week 16 win against the Houston Texans. He was released by Washington on August 31, 2003, prior to the start of the 2003 season.

On December 9, 2003, Joseph was signed to the practice squad of the Cincinnati Bengals. He was re-signed by the Bengals on December 29, after their season ended. He was waived/injured by the team on August 19, 2004, and placed on injured reserve due to an injured left arm. He was released after the season, on February 24, 2005. The Bengals were the last team of his professional career.
