= Langston Moore =

American football player (born 1981)

No. 74, 60, 91, 79
- Position: Defensive tackle

Personal information
- Born: July 19, 1981 (age 45); Charleston, South Carolina, U.S.
- Listed height: 6 ft 1 in (1.85 m)
- Listed weight: 305 lb (138 kg)

Career information
- College: South Carolina
- NFL draft: 2003: 6th round, 174th overall pick

Career history
- Cincinnati Bengals (2003–2004); Arizona Cardinals (2005–2006); Detroit Lions (2006–2008); Cincinnati Bengals (2009)*; Florida Tuskers (2010)
- * Offseason or practice squad member only

Awards and highlights
- Second-team All-SEC (2002)

Career NFL statistics
- Total tackles: 87
- Sacks: 5
- Forced fumbles: 1
- Pass deflections: 1
- Stats at Pro Football Reference

Langston Moore (born July 19, 1981) is an American former professional football player who was a defensive tackle in the National Football League (NFL). He played college football for the South Carolina Gamecocks and was selected 174th overall by the Cincinnati Bengals in the sixth round of the 2003 NFL draft. He also played for the Arizona Cardinals, Detroit Lions and Florida Tuskers.

Moore attended James Island Charter High School in Charleston, South Carolina, where he lettered in football and was a standout in Region AAAA play. He played college football at the University of South Carolina. Moore graduated from University of South Carolina in 2003.

He joined the Gamecock IMG Sports Network in 2012 as the sideline reporter for football broadcasts.

His father was the Ft. Wayne WOWO Radio and Charleston radio personality, Ken Moore.
