= Scott Kooistra =

American football player (born 1980)

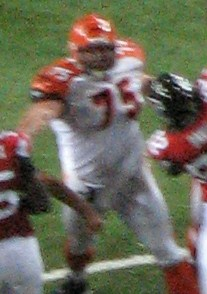
- Kooistra with the Cincinnati Bengals in 2007

No. 75
- Position: Offensive tackle

Personal information
- Born: October 14, 1980 (age 46); Madison, Wisconsin, U.S.
- Listed height: 6 ft 6 in (1.98 m)
- Listed weight: 335 lb (152 kg)

Career information
- High school: Cary (Cary, North Carolina)
- College: NC State
- NFL draft: 2003: 7th round, 215th overall pick

Career history
- Cincinnati Bengals (2003–2009); Cleveland Browns (2009); Baltimore Ravens (2010); Minnesota Vikings (2011)

Career NFL statistics
- Games played: 84
- Games started: 1
- Fumble recoveries: 1
- Stats at Pro Football Reference

Daniel Scott Kooistra [KOO-struh] (born October 14, 1980) is an American former professional football player who was an offensive tackle in the National Football League (NFL). He played college football for the NC State Wolfpack and was selected by the Cincinnati Bengals in the seventh round of the 2003 NFL draft. Kooistra was also a member of the Cleveland Browns, Baltimore Ravens and Minnesota Vikings.

== Early life ==
Kooistra was born in Madison Wisconsin. He attended East Cary Middle School where he made the A/B Honor Role in eighth grade. He played high school football for Cary High School in Cary, North Carolina where he was a "crowd favorite." Koostra started for two years, playing offensive and defensive tackle. Cary Coach Jay DeJeet said, "He is a very athletic big man and his footwork is exceptional."

== College career ==
Kooistra attended North Carolina State University on scholarship. He started every game as a tackle as a junior and a senior. As a senior in 2002, Kooistra was starting tackle for team that posted 11–3 record, capped by a win in the Gator Bowl. He was a History major while at NC State.

== Professional career ==
=== Cincinnati Bengals ===
Kooistra was selected by the Cincinnati Bengals in the seventh round (215th overall) of the 2003 NFL draft. He made his NFL debut versus the Denver Broncos on September 7. In his first season, he played in eight games. In 2004, he played in all 16 games and in both the 2005 and 2006 seasons he played in 15 games.

On January 30, 2007, Kooistra was tendered a 3-year deal with the Bengals keeping him in Cincinnati through the 2009 season. Kooistra was waived by the Bengals on November 3, 2009. He was re-signed on November 9, but waived again on November 24.

=== Cleveland Browns ===
Kooistra signed with the Cleveland Browns on December 22, 2009, after quarterback Brady Quinn was placed on injured reserve. Kooistra was waived on December 26 when the team promoted practice squad linebacker Titus Brown. Kooista was re-signed on December 29 after the team waived linebacker Arnold Harrison, but waived again on January 1, 2010, after defensive end Titus Adams was claimed off waivers.

Kooistra was re-signed to a future contract by the Browns on January 5, 2010. Kooistra was cut on September 4.

=== Baltimore Ravens ===
Kooistra signed with the Baltimore Ravens on October 5, 2010. He was waived on November 20, 2010.

=== Minnesota Vikings ===
Kooistra was signed with the Minnesota Vikings on July 31, 2011. He was placed on injured reserve on August 22, 2011.
