= 2009 Cincinnati Bengals season =

NFL team season

- Owner: Mike Brown
- Head coach: Marvin Lewis
- Offensive coordinator: Bob Bratkowski
- Defensive coordinator: Mike Zimmer
- Home stadium: Paul Brown Stadium

Results
- Record: 10–6
- Division place: 1st AFC North
- Playoffs: Lost Wild Card Playoffs (vs. Jets) 14–24
- All-Pros: CB Leon Hall (2nd team)
- Pro Bowlers: WR Chad Johnson; QB Carson Palmer

Uniform
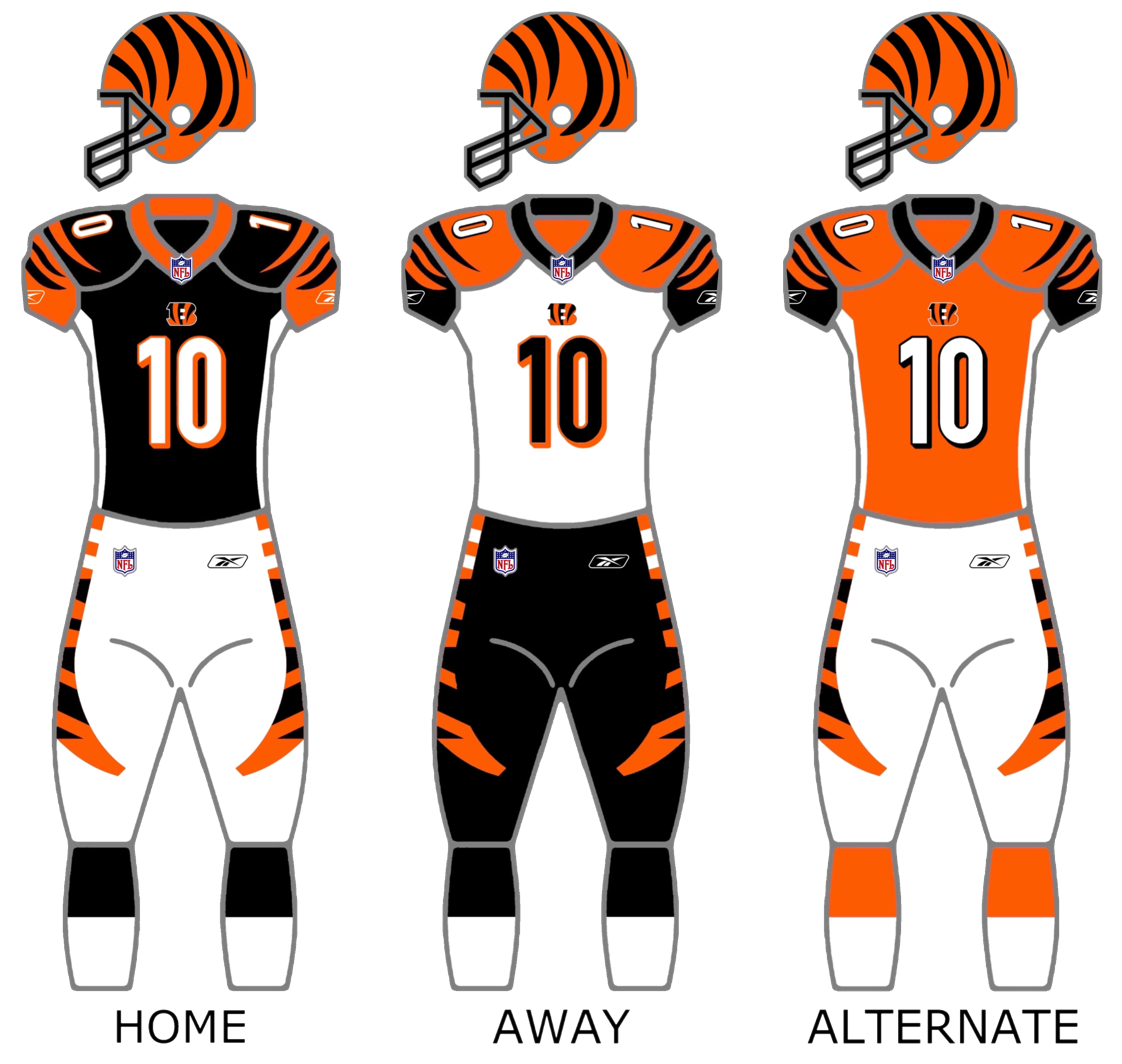

The 2009 Cincinnati Bengals season was the 40th season for the team in the National Football League (NFL) and their 42nd overall. They finished the season at 10–6, and sweeping the entire AFC North division, they improved on their 2008 record of 4–11–1, winning the AFC North Division and making the playoffs for the first time since 2005. Their season ended with a 24–14 loss against the New York Jets in the AFC Wild Card Playoff Round.

The head coach was Marvin Lewis, who had coached the team since 2003. He was chosen by the Associated Press as its NFL Coach of the Year following the season. Lewis was recognized for turning around the Bengals in the face of serious off-the-field adversity. First, three players were personally affected by the tsunami that hit American Samoa in late September. Shortly after this disaster, Vikki Zimmer, the wife of defensive coordinator Mike Zimmer, unexpectedly died. Finally, wide receiver Chris Henry, who suffered a season-ending injury in Week 9, died in December from injuries suffered when he fell from the back of a pickup truck during a domestic dispute.

== Off-season ==
=== Free agents ===
The following players who were on the Bengals' 2008 roster were eligible for free agency in 2009 or have been released by the team. A green background indicates that the player re-signed with the Bengals.

Pos.	Player	Tag	2009 Team	Signed
T	Stacy Andrews	UFA	Eagles	February 28
RB	Cedric Benson	UFA	Bengals	March 3
LB	Darryl Blackstock	UFA	Bengals	March 2
G	James Blair	UFA		
CB	Marcus Brown	UFA	Rams	March 16
SS	John Busing	UFA		
FB	Daniel Coats	UFA	Bengals	February 12
FS	Chris Crocker	UFA	Bengals	February 27
DE	Victor DeGrate	UFA		
RB	DeDe Dorsey	UFA	Bengals	February 27
QB	Ryan Fitzpatrick	UFA	Bills	February 27
CB	Jamar Fletcher	UFA		
SS	Kyries Hebert	UFA		
WR	Glenn Holt	UFA	Vikings	March 19
WR	T. J. Houshmandzadeh	UFA	Seahawks	March 2
C	Eric Ghiaciuc	UFA		
K	Shayne Graham	FFA		
SS	Dexter Jackson	UFA		
LB	Rashad Jeanty	RFA	Bengals	
LB	Brandon Johnson	RFA	Bengals	
SS	Ethan Kilmer	UFA	Dolphins	January 19
G	Evan Mathis	UFA		
LB	Corey Mays	UFA	Chiefs	March 13
RB	Chris Perry	RFA		
DT	John Thornton	UFA		
DE	Jimmy Verdon	RFA		
CB	Brandon Williams	UFA		
RB	Quincy Wilson	UFA		

=== Signings ===
Pos.	Player	2008 Team	Signed	Contract
RB	Cedric Benson	Bengals	March 3	2 years, $7M
LB	Darryl Blackstock	Bengals	March 2	undisclosed
FB	Daniel Coats	Bengals	February 12	undisclosed
WR	Laveranues Coles	Jets	March 10	4 years, $27.5M
FS	Chris Crocker	Bengals	February 27	4 years, $10M
RB	DeDe Dorsey	Bengals	February 27	undisclosed
QB	J. T. O'Sullivan	49ers	March 5	2 years
P	Ryan Plackemeier	Redskins	February 13	Waiver claim

=== 2009 NFL draft ===
Round	Pick	Player	Position	College
1	6	Andre Smith	Offensive tackle	Alabama
2	38	Rey Maualuga	Linebacker	USC
3	70	Michael Johnson	Defensive end	Georgia Tech
3	98	Chase Coffman	Tight end	Missouri
4	106	Jonathan Luigs	Center	Arkansas
5	142	Kevin Huber	Punter	Cincinnati
6	179	Morgan Trent	Cornerback	Michigan
6	209	Bernard Scott	Running back	Abilene Christian
7	215	Fui Vakapuna	Running back	BYU
7	249	Clinton McDonald	Defensive end	Memphis
7	252	Freddie Brown	Wide receiver	Utah

== Staff ==
Cincinnati Bengals 2009 staff
Front office: Principal owner/president/general manager – Mike Brown; Executive vice president – Katie Blackburn; Senior vice president of player personnel – Pete Brown; Vice president of player personnel – Paul H. Brown; Vice President - John Sayer; Vice President - Troy Blackburn; Director of player personnel – Duke Tobin; Director of Football Operations - Jim Lippincott; Head coaches: Head coach – Marvin Lewis; Assistant head coach/offensive line – Paul Alexander; Offensive coaches: Offensive coordinator – Bob Bratkowski; Quarterbacks – Ken Zampese; Running backs – Jim Anderson; Wide receivers – Mike Sheppard; Tight ends – Jonathan Hayes; Offensive Assistant - Bob Surace	Defensive coaches: Defensive coordinator – Mike Zimmer; Defensive line – Jay Hayes; Linebackers – Jeff FitzGerald; Defensive backs – Kevin Coyle; Assistant defensive backs – Louie Cioffi; Special teams coaches: Special teams – Darrin Simmons; Assistant special teams/assistant linebackers – Paul Guenther; Strength and conditioning: Strength and conditioning – Chip Morton; Assistant strength and conditioning – Ray Oliver; Coaching Assistant: David Lippincott

== Rosters ==
=== Opening training camp roster ===
Cincinnati Bengals roster
Quarterbacks: 4 J. T. O'Sullivan; 9 Carson Palmer; 5 Jordan Palmer; Running backs: 32 Cedric Benson; 27 DeDe Dorsey; 39 James Johnson; 23 Jeremi Johnson FB; 40 Brian Leonard; 30 Marlon Lucky; 36 Chris Pressley FB; 38 J. D. Runnels FB; 35 Bernard Scott; 37 Fui Vakapuna FB; 33 Kenny Watson; Wide receivers: 84 Freddie Brown; 87 Andre Caldwell; 83 Antonio Chatman; 11 Laveranues Coles; 12 Quan Cosby; 15 Chris Henry; 85 Chad Ochocinco; 16 Greg Orton; 14 Maurice Purify; 19 David Richmond; 89 Jerome Simpson; Tight ends: 86 Daniel Coats; 80 Chase Coffman; 49 Darius Hill; 82 Reggie Kelly; 81 Ben Utecht	Offensive linemen: 73 Anthony Collins T; 64 Kyle Cook C; 60 Andrew Crummey G; 75 Scott Kooistra G/T; 62 Nate Livings G; 50 Jonathan Luigs C; 66 Evan Mathis G; 74 Dennis Roland T; 65 Dan Santucci C; 77 Andrew Whitworth T; 63 Bobbie Williams G; Defensive linemen: 68 Jonathan Fanene DE; 91 Robert Geathers DE; 96 Chris Harrington DE; 93 Michael Johnson DE; 99 Tank Johnson DT; 69 Clinton McDonald DT; 98 Antwan Odom DE; 94 Domata Peko DT; 79 Pernell Phillips DT; 92 Frostee Rucker DE; 97 Jason Shirley DT; 90 Pat Sims DT	Linebackers: 56 Darryl Blackstock OLB; 52 Abdul Hodge ILB; 53 Rashad Jeanty OLB; 59 Brandon Johnson OLB; 57 Dhani Jones ILB; 58 Rey Maualuga OLB; 51 Jim Maxwell OLB; 55 Keith Rivers OLB; 46 Dan Skuta ILB; Defensive backs: 42 Chris Crocker FS; 29 Leon Hall CB; 34 Kyries Hebert SS; 20 David Jones CB; 22 Johnathan Joseph CB; 47 Corey Lynch FS; 28 Rico Murray CB; 41 Chinedum Ndukwe SS; 43 Tom Nelson SS; 24 Geoffrey Pope CB; 25 Morgan Trent CB; 26 Marvin White FS; 31 Roy Williams SS; Special teams: 17 Shayne Graham K; 10 Kevin Huber P; 48 Brad St. Louis LS/TE	Reserve lists: -- David Pollack OLB (Did Not Report); Unsigned draft picks: 71 Andre Smith OT; 78 Active, 1 Inactive, 1 Unsigned

=== Week 1 roster ===
Cincinnati Bengals week 1 roster
Quarterbacks: 4 J. T. O'Sullivan; 9 Carson Palmer; 5 Jordan Palmer; Running backs: 32 Cedric Benson; 27 DeDe Dorsey; 23 Jeremi Johnson FB; 40 Brian Leonard; 28 Bernard Scott; Wide receivers: 87 Andre Caldwell; 11 Laveranues Coles; 12 Quan Cosby PR; 15 Chris Henry; 85 Chad Ochocinco; 89 Jerome Simpson; Tight ends: 86 Daniel Coats; 80 Chase Coffman; 88 J. P. Foschi	Offensive linemen: 73 Anthony Collins T; 64 Kyle Cook C; 75 Scott Kooistra G; 62 Nate Livings G; 50 Jonathan Luigs C; 66 Evan Mathis G; 74 Dennis Roland T; 77 Andrew Whitworth T; 63 Bobbie Williams G; Defensive linemen: 68 Jonathan Fanene DE; 91 Robert Geathers DE; 93 Michael Johnson DE; 99 Tank Johnson DT; 98 Antwan Odom DE; 94 Domata Peko DT; 92 Frostee Rucker DE; 90 Pat Sims DT	Linebackers: 52 Abdul Hodge ILB; 53 Rashad Jeanty OLB; 59 Brandon Johnson OLB; 57 Dhani Jones ILB; 58 Rey Maualuga OLB; 55 Keith Rivers OLB; Defensive backs: 42 Chris Crocker FS; 29 Leon Hall CB; 34 Kyries Hebert SS; 20 David Jones CB; 22 Johnathan Joseph CB; 41 Chinedum Ndukwe SS; 43 Tom Nelson SS; 24 Geoffrey Pope CB; 25 Morgan Trent CB; 31 Roy Williams SS; Special teams: 17 Shayne Graham K; 10 Kevin Huber P; 48 Brad St. Louis LS/TE	Reserve lists: 83 Antonio Chatman WR (IR); 82 Reggie Kelly TE (IR); -- David Pollack OLB (Did Not Report); 65 Dan Santucci C (IR); 88 Matt Sherry TE (IR); 71 Andre Smith OT (Exempt.); 81 Ben Utecht TE (IR); Practice squad: 49 Darius Hill TE; 39 James Johnson RB; 47 Corey Lynch FS; 69 Clinton McDonald DT; 36 Chris Pressley FB; 14 Maurice Purify WR; 70 Jason Shirley G; 46 Dan Skuta ILB; 53 Active, 7 Inactive, 8 PS

=== Final roster ===
2009 Cincinnati Bengals roster
Quarterbacks (QB): 4 J. T. O'Sullivan; 9 Carson Palmer; 5 Jordan Palmer; Running backs (RB): 32 Cedric Benson; 23 Jeremi Johnson FB; 27 Larry Johnson; 40 Brian Leonard; 28 Bernard Scott KR; 37 Fui Vakapuna FB; Wide receivers (WR): 87 Andre Caldwell KR; 11 Laveranues Coles; 12 Quan Cosby KR/PR; 85 Chad Ochocinco; 89 Jerome Simpson; Tight ends (TE): 86 Daniel Coats; 88 J. P. Foschi; 49 Darius Hill	Offensive linemen (OL): 73 Anthony Collins T; 64 Kyle Cook C; 62 Nate Livings G; 50 Jonathan Luigs C; 66 Evan Mathis G; 74 Dennis Roland T; 71 Andre Smith T; 77 Andrew Whitworth T; 63 Bobbie Williams G; Defensive linemen (DL): 68 Jonathan Fanene DE; 91 Robert Geathers DE; 95 Orien Harris DT; 93 Michael Johnson DE; 99 Tank Johnson DT; 94 Domata Peko DT; 92 Frostee Rucker DE; 90 Pat Sims DT; 96 Shaun Smith DT	Linebackers (LB): 52 Abdul Hodge MLB; 53 Rashad Jeanty OLB; 59 Brandon Johnson OLB; 57 Dhani Jones MLB; 55 Keith Rivers OLB; 51 Dan Skuta MLB; Defensive backs (DB): 42 Chris Crocker FS; 29 Leon Hall CB; 34 Kyries Hebert SS; 20 David Jones CB; 22 Johnathan Joseph CB; 44 Rico Murray CB/S; 41 Chinedum Ndukwe SS; 43 Tom Nelson FS; 25 Morgan Trent CB; Special teams (ST): 17 Shayne Graham K; 46 Clark Harris LS; 10 Kevin Huber P	Practice squad: 84 Freddie Brown WR; 47 Carson Butler TE; 39 James Johnson RB; 69 Clinton McDonald DT; 21 Mike Mickens CB; 14 Maurice Purify WR; 70 Jason Shirley G; 24 Antonio Smith CB; Reserve: 80 Chase Coffman TE (IR); 82 Reggie Kelly TE (IR); 58 Rey Maualuga LB (IR); 98 Antwan Odom DE (IR); 65 Dan Santucci C (IR); 45 Matt Sherry TE (IR); 31 Roy Williams S (IR); Rookies in italics 53 active, 7 reserve, 8 practice squad

== Preseason ==
Week	Date	Opponent	Result	Record	Venue	Recap
1	August 14	at New Orleans Saints	L 7–17	0–1	Louisiana Superdome	Recap
2	August 20	at New England Patriots	W 7–6	1–1	Gillette Stadium	Recap
3	August 27	St. Louis Rams	L 21–24	1–2	Paul Brown Stadium	Recap
4	September 3	Indianapolis Colts	W 38–7	2–2	Paul Brown Stadium	Recap

== Regular season ==
=== Schedule ===
Week	Date	Opponent	Result	Record	Venue	Recap
1	September 13	Denver Broncos	**L** 7–12	0–1	Paul Brown Stadium	Recap
2	September 20	at Green Bay Packers	**W** 31–24	1–1	Lambeau Field	Recap
3	September 27	**Pittsburgh Steelers**	**W** 23–20	2–1	Paul Brown Stadium	Recap
4	October 4	at **Cleveland Browns**	**W** 23–20 (OT)	3–1	Cleveland Browns Stadium	Recap
5	October 11	at **Baltimore Ravens**	**W** 17–14	4–1	M&T Bank Stadium	Recap
6	October 18	Houston Texans	**L** 17–28	4–2	Paul Brown Stadium	Recap
7	October 25	Chicago Bears	**W** 45–10	5–2	Paul Brown Stadium	Recap
8	Bye					
9	November 8	**Baltimore Ravens**	**W** 17–7	6–2	Paul Brown Stadium	Recap
10	November 15	at **Pittsburgh Steelers**	**W** 18–12	7–2	Heinz Field	Recap
11	November 22	at Oakland Raiders	**L** 17–20	7–3	Oakland–Alameda County Coliseum	Recap
12	November 29	**Cleveland Browns**	**W** 16–7	8–3	Paul Brown Stadium	Recap
13	December 6	Detroit Lions	**W** 23–13	9–3	Paul Brown Stadium	Recap
14	December 13	at Minnesota Vikings	**L** 10–30	9–4	Mall of America Field	Recap
15	December 20	at San Diego Chargers	**L** 24–27	9–5	Qualcomm Stadium	Recap
16	December 27	Kansas City Chiefs	**W** 17–10	10–5	Paul Brown Stadium	Recap
17	January 3	at New York Jets	**L** 0–37	10–6	Giants Stadium	Recap

Note: Intra-division games are in bold text.

=== Standings ===
AFC North
	W	L	T	PCT	DIV	CONF	PF	PA	STK
^{(4)} Cincinnati Bengals	10	6	0	.625	6–0	7–5	305	291	L1
^{(6)} Baltimore Ravens	9	7	0	.563	3–3	7–5	391	261	W1
Pittsburgh Steelers	9	7	0	.563	2–4	6–6	368	324	W3
Cleveland Browns	5	11	0	.313	1–5	5–7	245	375	W4

=== Game summaries ===
==== Week 1: vs. Denver Broncos ====
Quarter	1	2	3	4	Total
**Broncos**	0	3	3	6	**12**
Bengals	0	0	0	7	**7**

at Paul Brown Stadium, Cincinnati, Ohio

- Game time: 1:00 pm EDT
- Game weather: 73 °F (23 °C) (Sunny)
- Game attendance: 62,831
- Referee: Jerome Boger
- TV announcers (CBS): Gus Johnson & Dan Fouts

The Bengals began their season in a Week 1 duel with the Denver Broncos. Both teams' defenses held each other in check, with Broncos kicker Matt Prater scoring the game's only points through three-quarters. Prater scored on a 48-yard field goal in the second quarter and a 50-yard field goal in the third to give Denver a 6–0 lead heading into the game's final quarter. The Bengals' first points of the game came when RB Cedric Benson scored a game-tying touchdown on a 1-yard run with just 38 seconds remaining in the game. The Shayne Graham PAT attempt was good, giving the Bengals a 7–6 lead. On the ensuing possession Broncos WR Brandon Stokley caught a pass off a deflection by Bengals CB Leon Hall and raced into the end zone for an improbable 87-yard touchdown reception in the game's final seconds. Bengals QB Carson Palmer had one last pass attempt on the final play of the game, but his desperation pass was intercepted sealing the victory for Denver. With the loss, Cincinnati started the season at 0–1.

==== Week 2: at Green Bay Packers ====
Quarter	1	2	3	4	Total
**Bengals**	7	14	7	3	**31**
Packers	14	7	0	3	**24**

at Lambeau Field, Green Bay, Wisconsin

- Game time: 12:00 pm CDT
- Game weather: 68 °F (20 °C) (Sunny)
- Game attendance: 70,678
- Referee: Ed Hochuli
- TV announcers (CBS): Ian Eagle & Rich Gannon

Hoping to rebound from a tough last-second loss to the Broncos, the Bengals flew to Lambeau Field for a Week 2 interconference duel with the Green Bay Packers. Cincinnati delivered the first score in the opening score as quarterback Carson Palmer completed a 5-yard touchdown pass to wide receiver Laveranues Coles. The Packers would respond as quarterback Aaron Rodgers completed a 3-yard touchdown pass to wide receiver Donald Driver, followed by running back Ryan Grant getting a 4-yard touchdown run. In the second quarter, the Bengals tied the game as Palmer got a 1-yard touchdown run. Green Bay would reply with cornerback Charles Woodson returning an interception 37 yards for a touchdown. Cincinnati would end the half as Palmer completed a 5-yard touchdown pass to wide receiver Chris Henry.

The Bengals would take the lead in the third quarter as Palmer completed a 13-yard touchdown pass to wide receiver Chad Ochocinco. In the fourth quarter, Cincinnati pulled away as kicker Shayne Graham nailed a 40-yard field goal. Afterwards, the Packers delivered their only response as kicker Mason Crosby got a 45-yard field goal.

With the win, the Bengals improved to 1–1. This was the first game the franchise had ever won in Green Bay.

==== Week 3: vs. Pittsburgh Steelers ====
Quarter	1	2	3	4	Total
Steelers	10	3	7	0	**20**
**Bengals**	0	3	6	14	**23**

at Paul Brown Stadium, Cincinnati, Ohio

- Game time: 4:15 pm EDT
- Game weather: 65 °F (18 °C) (Mostly Cloudy)
- Game attendance: 64,538
- Referee: Gene Steratore
- TV announcers (CBS): Jim Nantz & Phil Simms

Coming off the win the previous week in Green Bay, the Bengals faced the defending Super Bowl champion Pittsburgh Steelers back home in Cincinnati. The game was scoreless until halfway into the opening quarter, when Steelers kicker Jeff Reed kicked a 19-yard field goal to put the Steelers on the scoreboard 3–0. 6 minutes later, Steelers QB Ben Roethlisberger threw a 27-yard touchdown pass to RB Willie Parker to increase Pittsburgh's lead to 10–0 at the end of the first quarter.

They would add to that lead 3 minutes into the second quarter with another field goal by Reed, this one from 24 yards. Not until the final seconds of the first half would the Bengals make a mark on the scoreboard, with a 34-yard field goal by Cincinnati K Shayne Graham. At halftime the score was 13–3.

In the second half, the Bengals took advantage of the Steelers mistakes, when Bengals CB Johnathan Joseph intercepted a Ben Roethlisberger pass, returning it 30 yards for a TD. The PAT would not be successful because of a bad snap by Bengals LS Brad St. Louis. The Bengals had cut down the Steeler lead to 4 points, 13–9. At the 3-minute mark in the third quarter the Steelers would extend the lead on a quarterback sneak by Roethlisberger to put Pittsburgh ahead by 11 points, 20–9.

In the fourth quarter, with 9 minutes left in the game, Bengals RB Cedric Benson ran 23 yards for a Bengals touchdown, cutting the deficit to 5 points, 20–15. In the final two minutes of the game, Bengals QB Carson Palmer drove his team down the field converting both fourth down opportunities, one being a 4th and 10 completion to RB Brian Leonard for 11 yards. With 18 seconds left in the game, on the Steeler 4, Carson Palmer threw a touchdown pass to WR Andre Caldwell, putting the Bengals in the lead for good, with a successful two-point conversion by Leonard.

With the win, not only did the Bengals improve to 2–1, but they acquired their first home victory against the Steelers since 2001.

==== Week 4: at Cleveland Browns ====
Quarter	1	2	3	4	OT	Total
**Bengals**	7	7	0	6	3	**23**
Browns	0	7	7	6	0	**20**

at Cleveland Browns Stadium, Cleveland, Ohio

- Game time: 1:00 pm EDT
- Game weather: 58 °F (14 °C) (Cloudy)
- Game attendance: 69,844
- Referee: Scott Green
- TV announcers (CBS): Ian Eagle & Rich Gannon

Emerging from their divisional home win over the Steelers, the Bengals flew to Cleveland Browns Stadium for a Week 4 AFC North duel with the Cleveland Browns in Round 1 of 2009's Battle of Ohio. Cincinnati would start out fast in the first quarter with quarterback Carson Palmer's 5-yard touchdown pass to wide receiver Chad Ochocinco. In the second quarter, the Bengals would add to their lead with defensive end Robert Geathers returning a fumble 75 yards for a touchdown. The Browns would then close out the half with quarterback Derek Anderson's 1-yard touchdown pass to tight end Steve Heiden.

Cleveland would tie the game in the third quarter with Anderson's 1-yard touchdown run. In the fourth quarter, the Browns would take the lead with kicker Billy Cundiff's 26-yard and 31-yard field goals. Afterwards, Cincinnati would tie the game with Palmer and Ochocinco hooking up with each other again on a 2-yard touchdown pass (yet the following PAT was blocked). In a back-and-forth overtime, both Ohio teams fought each for possession. In the end, the Bengals would emerge on top as kicker Shayne Graham kicked the game-winning 31-yard field goal.

With the win, Cincinnati improved to 3–1, and, with the Baltimore Ravens loss later that day, tied the Ravens for first place in the division.

Following this victory, the Bengals earned the nickname the "Cardiac Cats" for pulling through in the clutch and coming from behind in three straight games for a victory.

For three Bengals players, this game was overshadowed by events that took place thousands of miles away. Jonathan Fanene, Rey Maualuga, and Domata Peko all have family in American Samoa, which was hit by a major tsunami the Tuesday before the game. All three struggled to contact their families in the aftermath of the disaster.

==== Week 5: at Baltimore Ravens ====
Quarter	1	2	3	4	Total
**Bengals**	0	3	7	7	**17**
Ravens	0	7	0	7	**14**

at M&T Bank Stadium, Baltimore, Maryland

- Game time: 1:00 pm EDT
- Game weather: 64 °F (18 °C) (Sunny)
- Game attendance: 71,161
- Referee: Jeff Triplette
- TV announcers (CBS): Gus Johnson & Steve Tasker

Coming off their overtime win over the Browns, the Bengals looked to win for defensive coordinator Mike Zimmer who had lost his wife during the week as they flew to M&T Bank Stadium for a Week 5 AFC North duel with the Baltimore Ravens. The winner of this game would take the lead in the division after five weeks.

After a scoreless first quarter, the Bengals would trail in the second quarter with Ravens safety Ed Reed returning an interception 52 yards for a touchdown. Cincinnati would begin to build steam as kicker Shayne Graham nailed a 32-yard field goal. The Bengals would take the lead in the third quarter with a 28-yard touchdown run from running back Cedric Benson. Baltimore then came back in the fourth quarter when Ray Rice caught a screen pass and ran it 48 yards for the go-ahead touchdown, but with 27 seconds left, Cincinnati would complete their comeback with a 20-yard touchdown pass from quarterback Carson Palmer to wide receiver Andre Caldwell, which led to Gus Johnson's line, "The Cardiac Cats strike again."

With the win, not only did the Bengals take the division lead at 4–1, but Benson (27 carries, 120 yards, 1 TD) would snap the Ravens defense's 40-game streak of not allowing a 100-yard rusher.

==== Week 6: vs. Houston Texans ====
Quarter	1	2	3	4	Total
**Texans**	7	7	14	0	**28**
Bengals	0	17	0	0	**17**

at Paul Brown Stadium, Cincinnati, Ohio

- Game time: 1:00 pm EDT
- Game weather: 49 °F (9 °C) (Sunny)
- Game attendance: 64,019
- Referee: Bill Leavy
- TV announcers (CBS): Don Criqui & Randy Cross

Coming off their thrilling road win over the Ravens, the Bengals went home for a Week 6 duel with the Houston Texans. Cincinnati would trail in the first quarter as Texans quarterback Matt Schaub hooked up with tight end Owen Daniels on a 12-yard touchdown pass. The Bengals would get on the board in the second quarter with running back Cedric Benson's 10-yard touchdown run. Houston would retake the lead with Schaub's 38-yard touchdown pass to running back Steve Slaton, yet Cincinnati would get the halftime lead with quarterback Carson Palmer's 8-yard touchdown pass to wide receiver Laveranues Coles and kicker Shayne Graham's 50-yard field goal.

However, the Texans struck back in the third quarter as Schaub completed a 23-yard touchdown pass to wide receiver Jacoby Jones, followed by a 7-yard touchdown pass to Daniels. Try as they might, the offense could not produce another miraculous win as Houston's defense held on for the win.

With the loss, the Bengals fell to 4–2.

==== Week 7: vs. Chicago Bears ====
Quarter	1	2	3	4	Total
Bears	0	3	0	7	**10**
**Bengals**	14	17	7	7	**45**

at Paul Brown Stadium, Cincinnati, Ohio

- Game time: 4:15 pm EDT
- Game weather: 61 °F (16 °C) (Cloudy)
- Game attendance: 64,900
- Referee: Walt Anderson
- TV announcers (Fox): Sam Rosen, Tim Ryan, and Laura Okmin

Game information
**First quarter**
- CIN TD: Chris Henry 9-yard TD pass from Carson Palmer (S. Graham kick)
  - The drive consisted of 8 plays, went for 77 yards and took 4:00 off the clock.
- CIN TD: C. Ochocinco 8-yard TD pass from C. Palmer (S. Graham kick)
  - The drive consisted of 8 plays, went for 80 yards and took 4:09 off the clock.

**Second quarter**

- CIN TD: J.P. Foschi 3-yard TD pass from Carson Palmer (Shayne Graham kick)
  - The drive consisted of 7 plays, went for 63 yards and took 3:04 off the clock.
- CIN TD: Laveranues Coles 8-yard TD pass from Carson Palmer (Shayne Graham kick)
  - The drive consisted of 12 plays, went for 66 yards and took 6:52 off the clock
- CIN FG: Shayne Graham 29-yard Field Goal kick
  - The drive consisted of 4 plays, went for 6 yards and took :56 off the clock
- CHI FG: Robbie Gould 22-yard Field Goal kick
  - The drive consisted of 9 plays, went for 70 yards and took 1:10 off the clock

**Third quarter**

- CIN TD: Chad Ochocinco 13-yard TD pass from Carson Palmer (Shayne Graham kick)
  - The drive consisted of 9 plays, went for 61 yards and took 4:30 off the clock

**Fourth quarter**

- CIN TD: Cedric Benson 1-yard TD run (Shayne Graham kick)
  - The drive consisted of 7 plays, went for 53 yards and took 3:08 off the clock
- CHI TD: Devin Hester 5-yard TD pass from Jay Cutler (Robbie Gould kick)
  - The drive consisted of 8 plays, went for 60 yards and took 3:09 off the clock

Hoping to rebound from their loss to the Texans, the Bengals stayed at home for a Week 7 inter conference duel with the Chicago Bears. In the first quarter, Cincinnati got off to a fast start as quarterback Carson Palmer completed a 9-yard touchdown pass to wide receiver Chris Henry and an 8-yard touchdown pass to wide receiver Chad Ochocinco. The Bengals would continue their dominating day in the second quarter as Palmer found tight end J.P. Foschi on a 3-yard touchdown pass and wide receiver Laveranues Coles on an 8-yard touchdown pass, followed by kicker Shayne Graham booting a 29-yard field goal. The Bears would close out the half with a 22-yard field goal from kicker Robbie Gould.

Afterwards, Cincinnati would pull away Palmer finding Ochocinco again on a 13-yard touchdown pass in the third quarter, followed by former Chicago running back Cedric Benson's 1-yard touchdown run. The Bears would then end the game with quarterback Jay Cutler hooking up with wide receiver Devin Hester on a 5-yard touchdown pass.

With the win, the Bengals went into their bye week at 5–2. And also surpassed their win total from last season. As of 2025, this is the Bengals most recent victory against the Bears.

==== Week 9: vs. Baltimore Ravens ====
Quarter	1	2	3	4	Total
Ravens	0	0	0	7	**7**
**Bengals**	14	3	0	0	**17**

at Paul Brown Stadium, Cincinnati, Ohio

- Game time: 1:00 pm EST
- Game weather: 67 °F (19 °C) (Sunny)
- Game attendance: 64,313
- Referee: Alberto Riveron
- TV announcers (CBS): Dick Enberg & Dan Fouts

Coming off their bye week, the Bengals stayed at home for a Week 9 AFC North rematch with the Baltimore Ravens. Cincinnati would get off to a fast start in the first quarter as quarterback Carson Palmer hooked up with wide receiver Andre Caldwell on a 6-yard touchdown pass, while running back Cedric Benson got a 1-yard touchdown run. In the second quarter, the Bengals would add onto their lead as kicker Shayne Graham nailed a 23-yard field goal. After a scoreless third quarter, the Ravens tried to strike back in the fourth quarter with running back Ray Rice getting a 2-yard touchdown run, yet Cincinnati's defense held on for the victory. Chad Ochocinco jokingly flashed a $1 bill at a referee during the third quarter, and was subsequently fined $20,000 by the NFL.

With the seasonal sweep over the Ravens for the 2nd time in 3 seasons, the Bengals improved to 6–2.

Benson (34 carries, 117 yards, 1 TD) would join Jerome Bettis in 1997 as the only running backs to run for over 100 yards against the Ravens twice in the same season.

This turned out to be Chris Henry's final game, as he was injured during the game and was placed on season-ending injured reserve. He was killed by injuries relating to a fall from a pick-up truck a month later.

==== Week 10: at Pittsburgh Steelers ====
Quarter	1	2	3	4	Total
**Bengals**	6	0	6	6	**18**
Steelers	3	6	0	3	**12**

at Heinz Field, Pittsburgh, Pennsylvania

- Game time: 1:00 pm EST
- Game weather: 64 °F (18 °C) (Cloudy)
- Game attendance: 65,392
- Referee: Terry McAulay
- TV announcers (CBS): Jim Nantz & Phil Simms

Coming off their season-sweeping home win over the Ravens, the Bengals flew to Heinz Field for a Week 10 AFC North rematch with the Pittsburgh Steelers with 1st place in the division on the line.

Cincinnati would trail in the first quarter as Steelers kicker Jeff Reed got a 28-yard field goal. The Bengals would immediately strike back as rookie running back Bernard Scott returned a kickoff 96 yards for a touchdown. In the second quarter, Pittsburgh would retake the lead with Reed's 33-yard and 35-yard field goals.

Cincinnati would regain the lead in the third quarter with kicker Shayne Graham getting a 23-yard and a 32-yard field goal. In the fourth quarter, the Steelers would tie the game with Reed booting a 34-yard field goal. Afterwards, the Bengals would pull away with Graham nailing a 32-yard and a 43-yard field goal.

With the win, not only did the Bengals improve to 7–2, but they acquired their first season-sweep over Pittsburgh since 1998 as the Steelers fell to 6–3.

==== Week 11: at Oakland Raiders ====
Quarter	1	2	3	4	Total
Bengals	7	7	3	0	**17**
**Raiders**	0	7	3	10	**20**

at Oakland–Alameda County Coliseum, Oakland, California

- Game time: 4:15 pm EST
- Game weather: 54 °F (12 °C) (Overcast)
- Game attendance: 34,112
- Referee: Don Carey
- TV announcers (CBS): Kevin Harlan & Solomon Wilcots

Coming off their road win over the Steelers, the Bengals flew to Oakland–Alameda County Coliseum for a Week 11 duel with the Oakland Raiders. In the first quarter, the Bengals had the lead as QB Carson Palmer scrambled 1 yard to the end zone for a touchdown. In the second quarter Palmer again made a 1-yard touchdown run. Oakland replied with QB Bruce Gradkowski making a 10-yard touchdown pass to TE Zach Miller. Next, Oakland kicker Sebastian Janikowski made a 52-yard field goal in the third quarter. To wrap up the third quarter kicker Shayne Graham made a 25-yard field goal for the Bengals. In the fourth quarter Oakland rallied as Gradkowski hooked up with WR Louis Murphy on 29-yard touchdown pass to tie the game. Janikowski hit the game winning 33-yard field goal with 12 seconds left to give Cincinnati a loss.

With the loss, Cincinnati fell to 7–3.

==== Week 12: vs. Cleveland Browns ====
Quarter	1	2	3	4	Total
Browns	0	0	7	0	**7**
**Bengals**	3	10	3	0	**16**

at Paul Brown Stadium, Cincinnati, Ohio

- Game time: 1:00 pm EST
- Game weather: 60 °F (16 °C) (Partly Cloudy)
- Game attendance: 64,553
- Referee: Mike Carey
- TV announcers (CBS): Ian Eagle & Rich Gannon

Hoping to rebound from their week 11 loss to Oakland, the Bengals stayed home for round two of the 2009 Battle of Ohio against the Cleveland Browns. The Bengals' first score came when Shayne Graham kicked a 37-yard field goal with 8:48 left in the first quarter, to make the score 3–0. With 6:38 left in the second quarter, J.Foschi caught a 4-yard touchdown pass from Carson Palmer to make the Bengals lead 10–0. The score at halftime was 13–0, after Shayne Graham kicked a 53-yard field goal with 0:21 left in the 2nd quarter.

The Browns' first and only score of the game was a 9-yard touchdown run by Brady Quinn, to make the score 13–7. The Bengals got a field goal in the 3rd quarter to make the score 16–7. The final score of the game was Bengals 16, Browns 7.

With the win, not only did the Bengals improve to 8–3, but they won all of their division matches for the first time in franchise history. Also, this would be the first season since the 2006 season where the Bengals won both games against the Browns.

==== Week 13: vs. Detroit Lions ====
Quarter	1	2	3	4	Total
Lions	7	0	0	6	**13**
**Bengals**	0	17	3	3	**23**

at Paul Brown Stadium, Cincinnati, Ohio

- Game time: 1:00 pm EST
- Game weather: 36 °F (2 °C) (Mostly Cloudy)
- Game attendance: 62,545
- Referee: Tony Corrente
- TV announcers (Fox): Thom Brennaman, Brian Billick & Laura Okmin

After the week 12 win over the Cleveland Browns, the Bengals stayed home for a game against the Detroit Lions. The first and only score of the first quarter for both teams came when the Lions' Calvin Johnson caught a 54-yard pass from Matthew Stafford for a touchdown, which made the Lions lead 7–0 at the end of the first quarter. In the second quarter, with 11:50 left, Jonathan Fanene got a 45-yard interception pass for a touchdown, which tied the game 7–7. Later in the 2nd quarter, with 5:50 left, Chad Ochocinco caught a 36-yard pass from Carson Palmer for a touchdown, which made the Bengals lead by 7. In celebration, he donned a poncho and sombrero, for which the NFL handed him another $20,000 fine. A 44-yard field goal by Shayne Graham with 0:09 left in the half made the halftime score 17–7. A 39-yard field goal by Shayne Graham was the only score for both teams in the 3rd quarter. With 8:11 left in the 4th quarter, Shayne Graham kicked a 23-yard field goal, to make the score 23–7. The Lions later had a 2-yard touchdown run by Kevin Smith with 1:36 left in the game. The Lions then attempted a 2-point conversion, but failed, making the final score 23–13.

With the win, the Bengals improved to 9–3 and secured only their third winning season in nineteen years .

==== Week 14: at Minnesota Vikings ====
Quarter	1	2	3	4	Total
Bengals	0	7	0	3	**10**
**Vikings**	0	16	7	7	**30**

at Hubert H. Humphrey Metrodome, Minneapolis, Minnesota

- Game time: 1:00 pm EST
- Game weather: None (Domed stadium)
- Game attendance: 63,854
- Referee: Scott Green
- TV announcers (CBS): Greg Gumbel & Dan Dierdorf

Following the Week 13 win over the Detroit Lions at home, the Bengals traveled to the Metrodome, looking for a big win over the Minnesota Vikings. In the opening quarter of the game, no one scored. The Vikings scored a field goal about 40 seconds into the second quarter, making them lead 3–0. Later in the second quarter, Sidney Rice caught a 9-yard touchdown pass from Brett Favre to make the score 10–0. The Bengals also scored in the second quarter with a 15-yard touchdown pass caught by Chad Ochocinco from Carson Palmer. The Vikings got two more field goals in the first half, making the score at halftime 16–7. The first and only score in the third quarter came for the Vikings when Adrian Peterson had a 1-yard touchdown run, to extend the Vikings' lead to 23–7. In the final quarter of the game, Shayne Graham Got a 22-yard field goal to make the score 23–10. The field goal was followed by a 3-yard touchdown run by Adrian Peterson for the Vikings, to make the final score 30–10.

Cedric Benson had 96 yards rushing. Chad Ochocinco had 27 yards receiving and one touchdown, and Andre Caldwell had 25 yards receiving.

With the Loss, the Bengals fell to 9–4.

==== Week 15: at San Diego Chargers ====
Quarter	1	2	3	4	Total
Bengals	3	10	0	11	**24**
**Chargers**	7	7	10	3	**27**

at Qualcomm Stadium, San Diego, California

- Game time: 4:05 pm EST
- Game weather: 69 °F (21 °C) (Sunny)
- Game attendance: 68,889
- Referee: Carl Cheffers
- TV announcers (CBS): Jim Nantz & Phil Simms

Still looking to clinch the AFC North Division after a disappointing road loss in Minnesota, the Bengals traveled west to take on the San Diego Chargers at Quallcomm Stadium. During the week, Chris Henry had died, and to honor him, the team all wore the number 15 on their helmets. Chad Ochocinco paid tribute to his teammate by kneeling for a prayer after he scored a touchdown in the first quarter.

The Chargers were the first to score, when Antonio Gates caught a 3-yard touchdown pass from Philip Rivers. The Bengals answered back with a 26-yard field goal by Shayne Graham to make the score 7–3. In the second quarter, Chad Ochocinco caught a 49-yard touchdown pass from Carson Palmer, and the Bengals took the lead, 10–7. Following the Bengals' touchdown, the Chargers also got a touchdown, to put the Chargers back on top, 14–10. Near the end of the first half, Shayne Graham kicked another field goal, this time from 25 yards, to make the score 14–13 at halftime. The Bengals could not manage to score in the 3rd quarter, while the Chargers got a touchdown and a field goal. The score was 24–13 at the end of the 3rd quarter. The Bengals finally managed to score in the 4th quarter when Laveranues Coles caught a 2-yard touchdown pass from Carson Palmer. The Bengals went for a two-point conversion, and were successful, making the score 24–21. Later in the quarter, Shayne Graham kicked another field goal, tying the game at 24 points for each team. The Chargers were then able to reach field goal range, and Nate Kaeding kicked a long 52-yard field goal to win the game.

With a second straight loss, Cincinnati fell to 9–5.

Due to the Baltimore Ravens win over the Chicago Bears, The Bengals were unable to claim the AFC North Division title.

==== Week 16: vs. Kansas City Chiefs ====
Quarter	1	2	3	4	Total
Chiefs	0	3	0	7	**10**
**Bengals**	0	3	7	7	**17**

at Paul Brown Stadium, Cincinnati, Ohio

- Game time: 1:00 pm EST
- Game weather: 40 °F (4 °C) (Cloudy)
- Game attendance: 64,333
- Referee: Ed Hochuli
- TV announcers (CBS): Dave Ryan & Steve Tasker

Still looking to win the AFC North division after a disappointing Week 15 loss at San Diego, the Bengals went back home to Cincinnati to take on the Kansas City Chiefs. The first quarter was quiet, with neither team managing to get any points. Near the end of the first half, the Chiefs got a penalty for a bad snap before a punt. The ball went over the kicker's head, and resulted in a 1st and Goal for the Bengals. Carson Palmer then threw a touchdown pass to Chad Ochocinco, but the touchdown was reversed because he went out of bounds before he made the catch. The Bengals were then forced to settle for a 29-yard field goal by Shayne Graham, to make the score 3–0 Bengals. At the end of the first half, Ryan Succop kicked a 30-yard field goal for the chiefs, making the halftime score a tie, 3–3.

The Bengals' offense did better at the beginning of the 3rd quarter, getting into the red zone in their first drive of the second half. Carson Palmer then threw a touchdown pass to Laveranues Coles, to put the Bengals on top, 10–3.

Eight seconds into the 4th quarter, Tim Castille caught his first career touchdown, a 20-yard reception, to tie the score again, 10–10. The Bengals got yet another touchdown in the 4th quarter, and won the game 17–10.

With the win, the Cincinnati Bengals clinched the AFC Northern Division Title and improved their regular season record to 10–5.

==== Week 17: at New York Jets ====
Quarter	1	2	3	4	Total
Bengals	0	0	0	0	**0**
**Jets**	7	20	3	7	**37**

at Giants Stadium, East Rutherford, New Jersey

- Game time: 8:20 pm EST
- Game attendance: 79,106
- Referee: Walt Anderson
- TV announcers (NBC): Al Michaels, Cris Collinsworth, and Andrea Kremer

After clinching the AFC north the previous week, the Bengals traveled to take on the New York Jets on Sunday Night Football. This would prove to be the final game to ever be played at Giants Stadium.

The Bengals did not score in the first quarter, while the Jets had a 1-yard touchdown run by Thomas Jones to put the Jets up 7–0. The Bengals also failed to score in the 2nd quarter, while the Jets' offense had a very productive 2nd quarter, scoring 20 points. The Jets got a 20-yard field goal, to make the score 10–0 Jets. Brad Smith then had a 32-yard touchdown run to make the score 17–0. The Jets then got another touchdown run by Jerricho Cotchery. to make the score 24–0. The Jets finished the half with another field goal, to make the halftime score 27–0 Jets. The only score of the 3rd quarter came when J. Feely got a 40-yard field goal, to make the score 30–0. The Jets finished the game with another touchdown run by Thomas Jones, this time from 2 yards. The final score was Jets 37, Bengals 0.

With the shutout loss, the Bengals finished the 2009 regular season with a record of 10–6. By far, this is the only time in the Marvin Lewis era that the team has been shutout and suffered their first regular season shutout loss since 2001 when they lost 16–0 to the Ravens which was also a road game.

== Postseason ==
=== Schedule ===
Round	Date	Opponent (seed)	Result	Record	Venue	Recap
Wild Card	January 9, 2010	New York Jets (5)	L 14–24	0–1	Paul Brown Stadium	Recap

=== Game summaries ===
==== AFC Wild Card Playoffs: vs. (5) New York Jets ====
Quarter	1	2	3	4	Total
Jets	0	14	7	3	24
Bengals	7	0	0	7	14

at Paul Brown Stadium, Cincinnati, Ohio

- Game time: 4:30 pm EST
- Game weather: 21 °F (−6 °C) (Cloudy)
- Game attendance: 63,686
- Referee: Bill Leavy
- TV announcers (NBC): Tom Hammond, Joe Gibbs, Joe Theismann, and Tiki Barber

In the wild card round of the playoffs, the Jets now had to travel to Paul Brown Stadium. The Bengals scored first when Carson Palmer threw an 11-yard TD pass to Laveranues Coles. In the second quarter, Jets RB Shonn Greene ran 39 yards for a TD, and Carson Palmer threw an interception that was returned for 20 yards. Mark Sanchez passed to Dustin Keller for a 45-yard TD, and the next scoring drive would come in the third quarter when Thomas Jones made a 9-yard TD run. Cedric Benson made a 47-yard TD in the fourth quarter, and the Jets responded with a 20-yard FG by Jay Feely. They halted any further attempts by the Bengals at a scoring drive, sacking Carson Palmer twice. The Jets ran out the clock for the last two minutes to end the game at 24–14.

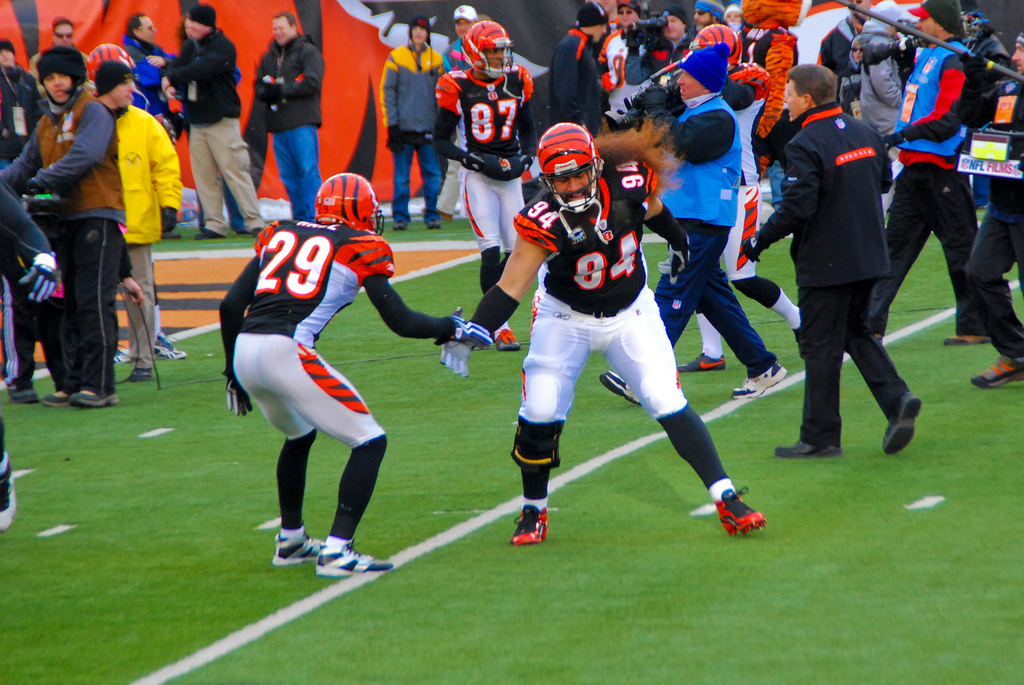
Domata Peko and Leon Hall before the playoff game

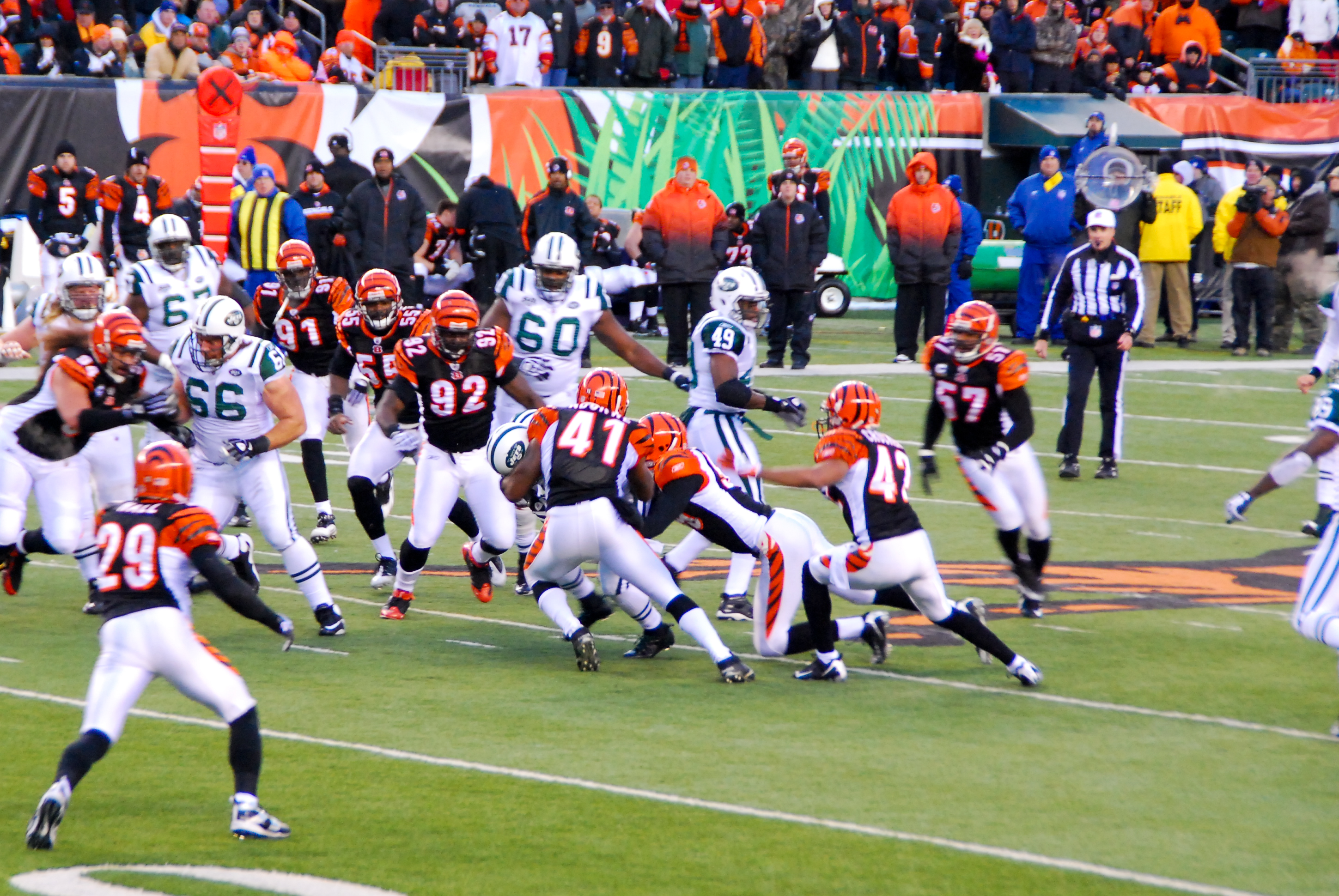
The Bengals on defense against the Jets in the wild card game

=== Standings breakdown ===
	W	L	T	Pct.	PF	PA
Home	6	2	0	.750	145	97
Away	4	4	0	.500	140	184
AFC North Opponents	6	0	0	1.000	114	80
AFC Opponents	7	5	0	.583	189	148
NFC Opponents	3	1	0	.750	109	77
By Stadium Type
Indoors	0	1	0	.000	10	30
Outdoors	10	5	0	.667	288	195
