= Daniel Coats =

Daniel Coats may refer to:

- Dan Coats (born 1943), former Director of National Intelligence and former United States Senator from Indiana
- Daniel Coats (American football) (born 1984), American football player
