= Jordan Palmer =

American football player (born 1984)

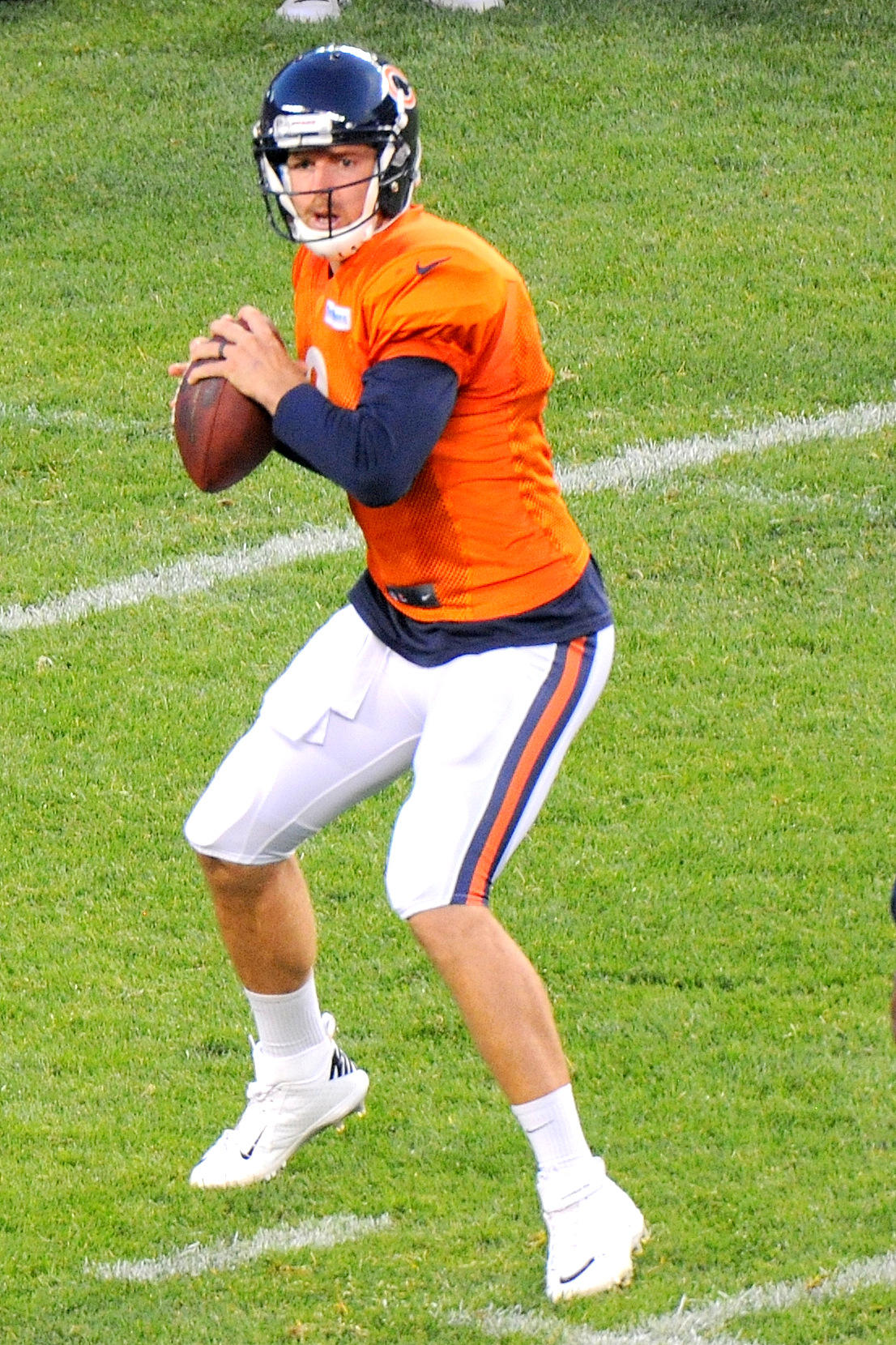
- Palmer at Chicago Bears training camp in 2014

No. 5
- Position: Quarterback

Personal information
- Born: May 30, 1984 (age 42); Westlake Village, California, U.S.
- Listed height: 6 ft 5 in (1.96 m)
- Listed weight: 230 lb (104 kg)

Career information
- High school: Mission Viejo (Mission Viejo, California)
- College: UTEP (2003–2006)
- NFL draft: 2007: 6th round, 205th overall pick

Career history
- Washington Redskins (2007)*; Arizona Rattlers (2008)*; Cincinnati Bengals (2008–2010); Sacramento Mountain Lions (2011)*; Jacksonville Jaguars (2012); Chicago Bears (2013); Buffalo Bills (2014)*; Tennessee Titans (2014)
- * Offseason or practice squad member only

Career NFL statistics
- Passing attempts: 18
- Passing completions: 11
- Completion percentage: 61.1%
- TD–INT: 0–2
- Passing yards: 66
- Passer rating: 28.7
- Stats at Pro Football Reference

Jordan William Palmer (born May 30, 1984) is an American former professional football player who was a quarterback in the National Football League (NFL). He was selected by the Washington Redskins in the sixth round of the 2007 NFL draft. He played college football for the UTEP Miners.

Palmer was also a member of the Arizona Rattlers, Cincinnati Bengals, Sacramento Mountain Lions, Jacksonville Jaguars, Chicago Bears, Buffalo Bills, and Tennessee Titans. He is the younger brother of former NFL quarterback Carson Palmer.

== Early life ==
Jordan William Palmer was born on May 30, 1984, in Westlake Village, California. He attended Mission Viejo High School in Mission Viejo, California.

== College career ==
During his freshman year at the University of Texas at El Paso, Palmer threw seven touchdowns and 13 interceptions while completing 49.5% of his passes for 1,168 yards. During his sophomore year he threw for 26 touchdowns and 18 interceptions while completing 58.2% of his passes for 2,618 yards. In his junior year in 2005, he led the Miners to the 2005 GMAC Bowl against Toledo. He threw for a career-high 29 touchdowns and 19 interceptions while completing 59.4% of his passes for 3,503 yards. In his senior season in 2006, Palmer threw for 26 touchdowns and 14 interceptions. He completed 65.7% of his passes while his team went 5–7 and did not qualify for post-season play.

== Professional career ==
Pre-draft measurables
Height	Weight	Arm length	Hand span	40-yard dash	10-yard split	20-yard split	20-yard shuttle	Three-cone drill	Vertical jump	Broad jump	Wonderlic
6 ft 5 5/8 in (1.97 m)	231 lb (105 kg)	33 3/8 in (0.85 m)	10 in (0.25 m)	4.99 s	1.75 s	2.91 s	4.58 s	7.32 s	30.5 in (0.77 m)	8 ft 8 in (2.64 m)	23
All values from NFL Combine

=== Washington Redskins ===
The Washington Redskins drafted Palmer in the sixth round of the 2007 NFL draft with the 205th pick overall.

On August 4, 2007, the Baltimore Ravens hosted the Redskins in a pre-season game in Baltimore. Their only score of the scrimmage was on a 24-yard touchdown pass from Palmer to rookie wide receiver Burl Toler.

On September 2, 2007, the Redskins waived Palmer during final cuts.

=== Arizona Rattlers ===
On November 6, 2007, Palmer signed with the Arizona Rattlers of the Arena Football League for the 2008 season.

=== Cincinnati Bengals ===
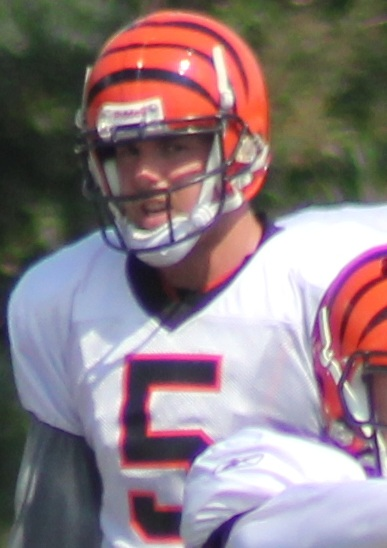
Palmer in 2010

On January 30, 2008, Palmer signed a two-year contract with the Cincinnati Bengals. The Palmer brothers became the first brothers in NFL history to hold a quarterback position on the same team at the same time; brothers Koy and Ty Detmer were both on the Philadelphia Eagles roster at the same time, but Ty was on injured reserve.

After the release of back-up quarterback J. T. O'Sullivan, Palmer was promoted to the backup quarterback of the Bengals behind his older brother Carson for the 2010 season.

On November 21, 2010, the Palmer brothers became the first pair in NFL history to play quarterback in the same game for the same team, in a loss to the Buffalo Bills.

The Bengals released Palmer on August 27, 2011.

=== Sacramento Mountain Lions ===
Palmer signed with the Sacramento Mountain Lions of the United Football League on September 8, 2011. He was released on September 12 before the start of the 2011 UFL season.

=== Jacksonville Jaguars ===
Palmer was signed by the Jacksonville Jaguars on May 7, 2012 and spent the preseason with the team until being released during final roster cuts on August 31. Palmer was re-signed on November 21, after starting quarterback Blaine Gabbert was placed on injured reserve. He was later released again on November 28.

=== Chicago Bears ===
Palmer signed with the Chicago Bears on August 16, 2013, after third-string quarterback Matt Blanchard broke his hand. Palmer had previously worked out with the Bears during the 2013 offseason. He was released on August 30. After the Bears lost Jay Cutler to an injury in Week 7 against the Washington Redskins on October 20, the Bears reported they would bring back Palmer to back up Josh McCown. Palmer was officially signed on October 28. Two days before the start of the 2014 free agency period, Palmer re-signed with the Bears on a one-year deal. The Bears released Palmer on August 24, 2014.

=== Buffalo Bills ===
On August 25, 2014, Palmer signed with the Buffalo Bills, but was released on August 29.

=== Tennessee Titans ===
On December 15, 2014, Palmer signed with the Tennessee Titans to backup Charlie Whitehurst for the remainder of the 2014 season after Jake Locker was placed on injured reserve. Palmer made just over $67,000 for his month with the Titans.

== Career statistics ==
=== NFL ===
==== Regular season ====
Year	Team	Games			Passing								Rushing				Sacks		Fumbles (Note: Fumbles lost data taken from Pro Football Reference career game log)	
Year	Team	GP	GS	Record	Cmp	Att	Pct	Yds	Y/A	TD	Int	Rtg	Att	Yds	Avg	TD	Sck	SckY	Fum	Lost
2008	CIN	3	0	–	7	12	58.3	41	3.4	0	2	25.3	1	4	4.0	0	2	11	0	0
2009	CIN	0	0	DNP																
2010	CIN	1	0	–	3	3	100.0	18	6.0	0	0	91.7	0	0	0.0	0	2	20	0	0
2012	JAX	0	0	DNP																
2013	CHI	0	0	DNP																
2014	TEN	1	0	–	1	3	33.3	7	2.3	0	0	42.4	1	-1	-1.0	0	0	0	0	0
Career		5	0	–	11	18	61.1	66	3.7	0	2	28.7	2	3	1.5	0	4	31	0	0

==== Playoffs ====
Year	Team	Games			Passing								Rushing				Sacks		Fumbles	
Year	Team	GP	GS	Record	Cmp	Att	Pct	Yds	Y/A	TD	Int	Rtg	Att	Yds	Avg	TD	Sck	SckY	Fum	Lost
2009	CIN	0	0	DNP																

=== College ===
Year	Team	Passing								Rushing			
Year	Team	Cmp	Att	Pct	Yds	Y/A	TD	Int	Rtg	Att	Yds	Avg	TD
2003	UTEP	98	198	49.5	1,168	5.9	7	13	97.6	67	110	1.6	3
2004	UTEP	213	366	58.2	2,818	7.7	26	18	136.5	46	-17	-0.4	1
2005	UTEP	258	434	59.4	3,503	8.1	29	19	140.5	56	-50	-0.9	2
2006	UTEP	282	429	65.7	3,595	8.4	26	14	149.6	47	-86	-1.8	1
Career		851	1,427	59.6	11,084	7.8	88	64	136.3	216	-43	-0.2	7

== Coaching career ==
Palmer worked as a quarterbacks coach at EXOS, an NFL Draft training center in Carlsbad, California, in early 2014.

As the founder of QB Summit, an in-person Orange County, California, quarterback consulting program and online digital platform, Palmer tutored players including Patrick Mahomes, Deshaun Watson, Josh Allen, Sam Darnold, Joe Burrow, Kyle Allen, and Bo Nix, among others. Darnold currently employs Palmer as his private quarterbacks coach.

In August 2022, Palmer was named Director of Quarterback Development for the XFL.

== Personal life ==
He is the younger brother of former NFL quarterback Carson Palmer, who was the first overall pick in the 2003 NFL draft by the Cincinnati Bengals. The two spent three seasons together as teammates with the Bengals, with him being Carson's backup.

== See also ==
- List of Division I FBS passing yardage leaders
