= David Jones (cornerback) =

American football player (born 1985)

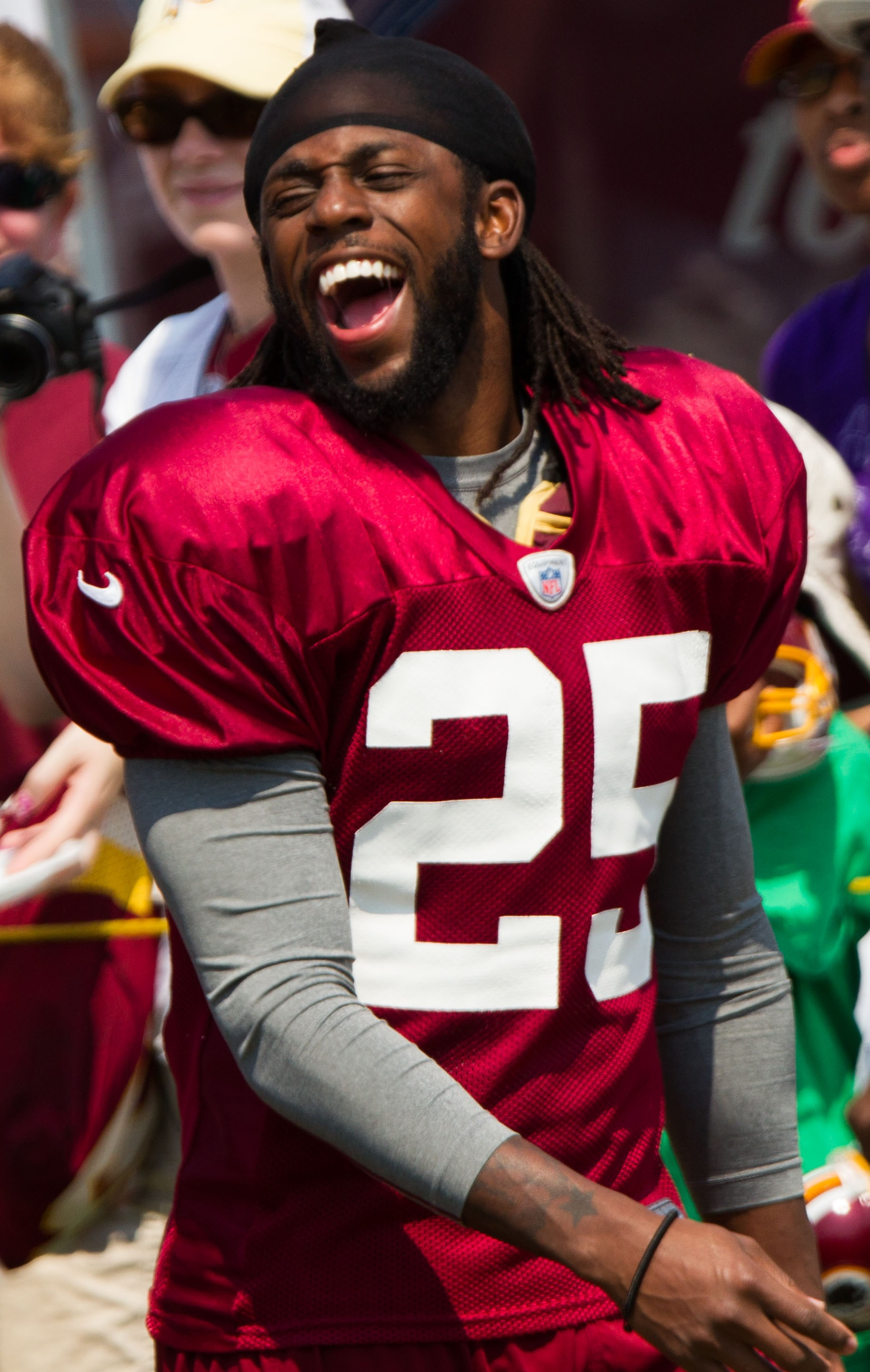
- Jones with the Washington Redskins in 2012

No. 20, 31, 35
- Position: Cornerback

Personal information
- Born: September 19, 1985 (age 41); Greenville, South Carolina, U.S.
- Listed height: 6 ft 0 in (1.83 m)
- Listed weight: 196 lb (89 kg)

Career information
- High school: Greenville
- College: Wingate (2003-2006)
- NFL draft: 2007: 5th round, 145th overall pick

Career history
- New Orleans Saints (2007)*; Cincinnati Bengals (2007−2010); Jacksonville Jaguars (2010−2011); Washington Redskins (2012)
- * Offseason or practice squad member only

Career NFL statistics
- Total tackles: 102
- Forced fumbles: 1
- Fumble recoveries: 1
- Pass deflections: 11
- Interceptions: 1
- Stats at Pro Football Reference

David Jones (born September 19, 1985) is an American former professional football player who was a cornerback in the National Football League (NFL). He played college football for the Wingate Bulldogs and was selected by the New Orleans Saints in the fifth round of the 2007 NFL draft. Jones has also played for the Cincinnati Bengals, Jacksonville Jaguars, and Washington Redskins.

== College career ==
Jones attended Wingate University, where he earned the name Jam Hands Jones. He is the first player ever from his college to be drafted to the NFL. He played between 2003 and 2006, where he made 15 interceptions and 110 tackles. He was a marketing major.

== Professional career ==
=== New Orleans Saints ===
Jones was selected by the New Orleans Saints in the fifth round (145th overall) of the 2007 NFL draft. He played in all five of their preseason games, but was then cut by the Saints.

=== Cincinnati Bengals ===
Jones was claimed off of waivers by the Cincinnati Bengals on September 9, 2007.

=== Jacksonville Jaguars ===
Jones was traded to the Jacksonville Jaguars for safety Reggie Nelson and a conditional draft pick on September 4, 2010. It was later announced that the conditions for the draft pick were not met, so this was a one-for-one trade. Jones was released from the Jaguars on September 12, 2011. He was re-signed on December 3.

=== Washington Redskins ===
On July 24, 2012, Jones signed with the Washington Redskins. He was released on August 31, 2012, for final cuts before the start of the 2012 season. The Redskins re-signed him on September 25. After playing five games, he was waived again on November 6.

== NFL career statistics ==
Legend
**Bold**	Career high

=== Regular season ===
Year	Team	Games		Tackles					Interceptions					Fumbles			
Year	Team	GP	GS	Cmb	Solo	Ast	Sck	TFL	Int	Yds	TD	Lng	PD	FF	FR	Yds	TD
2007	CIN	7	0	3	2	1	0.0	0	0	0	0	0	0	0	0	0	0
2008	CIN	14	7	**43**	**36**	**7**	0.0	0	0	0	0	0	**6**	0	**1**	**12**	0
2009	CIN	12	0	11	7	4	0.0	0	0	0	0	0	1	0	0	0	0
2010	JAX	16	5	33	31	2	0.0	0	**1**	0	0	0	3	**1**	0	0	0
2011	JAX	5	0	4	3	1	0.0	0	0	0	0	0	1	0	0	0	0
2012	WAS	5	0	8	8	0	0.0	0	0	0	0	0	0	0	0	0	0
		59	12	102	87	15	0.0	0	1	0	0	0	11	1	1	12	0

=== Playoffs ===
Year	Team	Games		Tackles					Interceptions					Fumbles			
Year	Team	GP	GS	Cmb	Solo	Ast	Sck	TFL	Int	Yds	TD	Lng	PD	FF	FR	Yds	TD
2009	CIN	1	0	2	0	2	0.0	0	0	0	0	0	1	0	0	0	0
		1	0	2	0	2	0.0	0	0	0	0	0	1	0	0	0	0
