= Chris Crocker (American football) =

American football player and coach (born 1980)

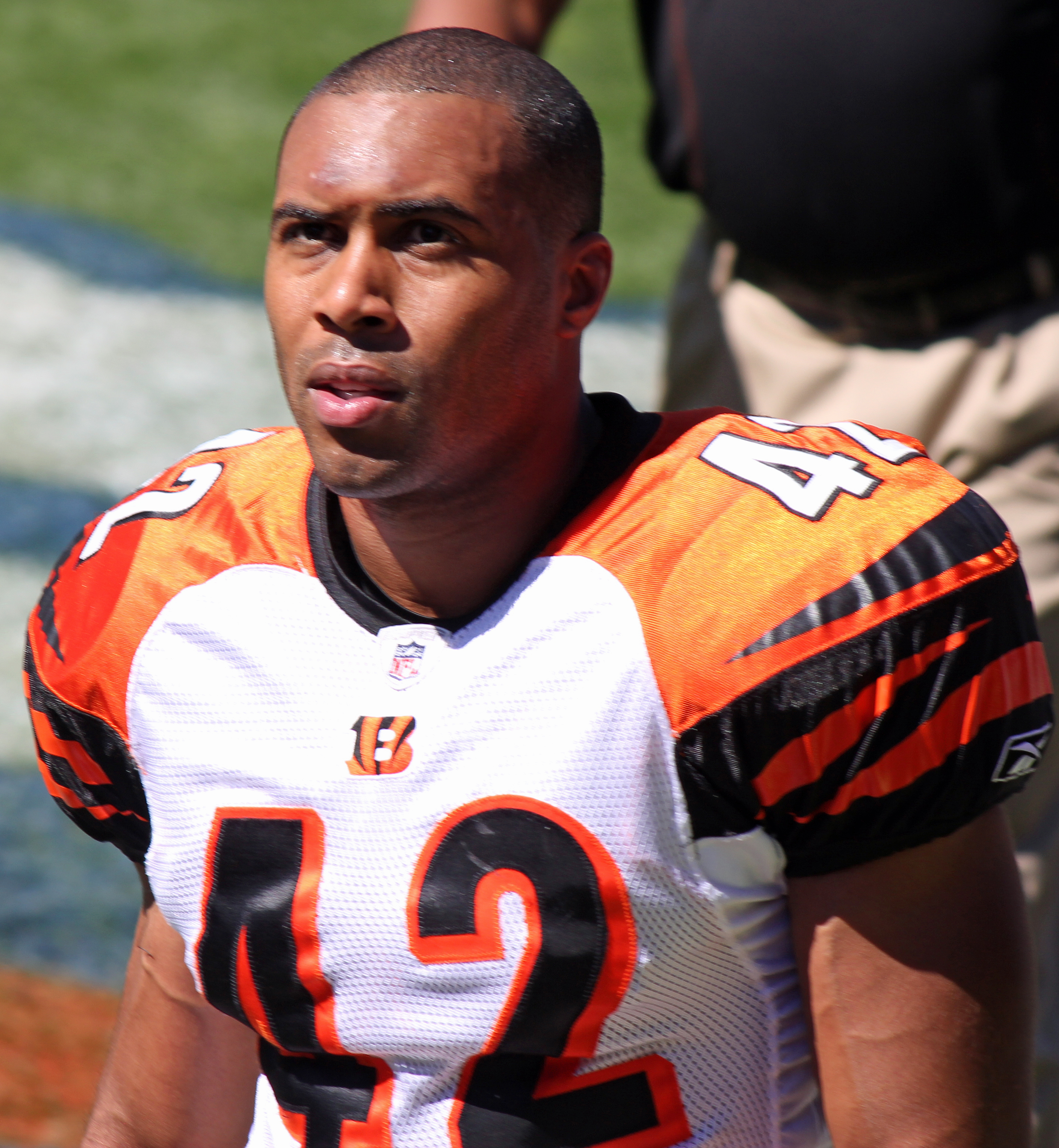
- Crocker with the Cincinnati Bengals in 2011

No. 25, 20, 42, 33, 32
- Position: Safety

Personal information
- Born: March 9, 1980 (age 46); Norfolk, Virginia, U.S.
- Listed height: 5 ft 11 in (1.80 m)
- Listed weight: 200 lb (91 kg)

Career information
- High school: Deep Creek (Chesapeake, Virginia)
- College: Marshall (1999–2002)
- NFL draft: 2003: 3rd round, 84th overall pick

Career history

Playing
- Cleveland Browns (2003−2005); Atlanta Falcons (2006−2007); Miami Dolphins (2008); Cincinnati Bengals (2008–2013); Minnesota Vikings (2014)*
- * Offseason or practice squad member only

Coaching
- Atlanta Legends (2019) Defensive assistant; St. Louis BattleHawks (2020) Defensive assistant

Awards and highlights
- First-team All-MAC (2001); Second-team All-MAC (2002)

Career NFL statistics
- Total tackles: 556
- Sacks: 14.5
- Forced fumbles: 7
- Fumble recoveries: 3
- Interceptions: 15
- Defensive touchdowns: 2
- Stats at Pro Football Reference

Christopher Alan Crocker (born March 9, 1980) is an American former professional football player who was a safety in the National Football League (NFL). He was selected by the Cleveland Browns in the third round of the 2003 NFL draft. He played college football for the Marshall Thundering Herd.

Crocker was also a member of the Atlanta Falcons, Miami Dolphins, Cincinnati Bengals, and Minnesota Vikings.

Crocker worked with the Atlanta Legends of the now-defunct Alliance of American Football. In June 2019, he was hired as a member of the St. Louis BattleHawks coaching staff in the XFL.

== College career ==
Crocker played college football for Marshall. While there he was All-Mid-American Conference first-team in 2001 and second-team in 2002. He was second on the team in tackles as a senior with 126 stops and broke up ten passes. He was third on the Herd with 88 tackles in 2001 and led the team with 10 passes broken up.

He helped Marshall win MAC titles in 1999, 2000 and 2002. He also helped lead Marshall to bowl victories in 1999, 2000, 2001 and 2002.

== Professional career ==
=== Cleveland Browns ===
Crocker was selected in the third round, 84th overall, in 2003 by the Cleveland Browns, where he played from 2003 to 2005. In three seasons with the Browns he made 172 tackles, three interceptions, and four sacks.

=== Atlanta Falcons ===
Before the 2006 season, he was traded to the Atlanta Falcons for a fourth round draft pick in the 2006 NFL draft. In two seasons with the Falcons he totaled 105 tackles, four interceptions, and two sacks.

=== Miami Dolphins ===
On March 29, 2008, the Miami Dolphins signed Crocker to a one-year $1.151 million contract with $300,000 guaranteed. He spent the first seven weeks of the 2008 season with the Dolphins, appearing in six games (two starts) and recording 10 tackles and a pass deflection. He was released on October 21 when the team re-signed safety Tyrone Culver.

=== Cincinnati Bengals ===
Crocker signed with the Cincinnati Bengals on October 30, 2008, for the final half on the 2008 season. He signed a new four-year contract with the Bengals worth $10 million on February 27, 2009. He was released on April 6, 2012. Crocker was re-signed by the Bengals on September 27.

=== Minnesota Vikings ===
The Minnesota Vikings signed with Crocker on August 4, 2014. Head coach Mike Zimmer had worked with Crocker for seven years in Atlanta and Cincinnati.

== NFL career statistics ==
Legend
**Bold**	Career high

=== Regular season ===
Year	Team	Games		Tackles					Interceptions					Fumbles			
Year	Team	GP	GS	Cmb	Solo	Ast	Sck	TFL	Int	Yds	TD	Lng	PD	FF	FR	Yds	TD
2003	CLE	**16**	1	35	27	8	0.0	1	0	0	0	0	2	0	0	0	0
2004	CLE	12	5	56	46	10	2.0	3	1	20	**1**	20	4	0	0	0	0
2005	CLE	**16**	**16**	**82**	**51**	**31**	2.0	2	2	35	0	24	4	**2**	**1**	0	0
2006	ATL	**16**	**16**	50	44	6	1.0	3	1	28	0	28	8	0	0	0	0
2007	ATL	14	14	55	**51**	4	1.0	4	**3**	40	0	18	**11**	0	**1**	0	0
2008	MIA	6	2	10	10	0	0.0	0	0	0	0	0	1	0	0	0	0
2008	CIN	8	6	34	25	9	1.5	**5**	1	22	0	22	2	1	0	0	0
2009	CIN	13	13	52	40	12	0.0	1	2	38	0	20	9	1	0	0	0
2010	CIN	9	9	43	31	12	2.0	2	0	0	0	0	5	**2**	0	0	0
2011	CIN	**16**	**16**	61	45	16	**3.5**	2	0	0	0	0	5	1	0	0	0
2012	CIN	13	9	41	29	12	0.0	1	**3**	**52**	0	29	5	0	**1**	**12**	0
2013	CIN	12	3	37	28	9	1.5	**5**	2	41	**1**	**32**	7	0	0	0	0
		151	110	556	427	129	14.5	29	15	276	2	32	63	7	3	12	0

=== Playoffs ===
Year	Team	Games		Tackles					Interceptions					Fumbles			
Year	Team	GP	GS	Cmb	Solo	Ast	Sck	TFL	Int	Yds	TD	Lng	PD	FF	FR	Yds	TD
2009	CIN	**1**	**1**	**4**	**3**	**1**	0.0	0	0	0	0	0	0	0	0	0	0
2011	CIN	**1**	**1**	2	2	0	0.0	0	0	0	0	0	**1**	0	0	0	0
2013	CIN	**1**	**1**	2	1	**1**	**0.5**	0	0	0	0	0	0	0	0	0	0
		3	3	8	6	2	0.5	0	0	0	0	0	1	0	0	0	0

== Coaching career ==
In 2019, Crocker worked with the Atlanta Legends of the Alliance of American Football. In June 2019, he was hired as a member of the St. Louis BattleHawks coaching staff in the XFL as a defensive assistant.
