= J. T. O'Sullivan =

American football player (born 1979)

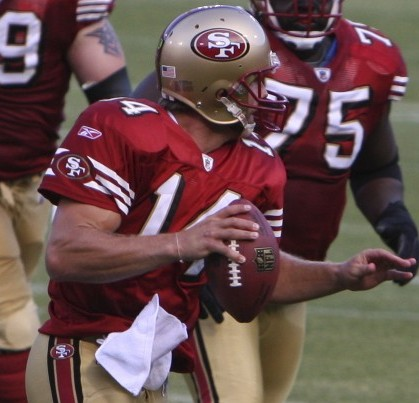
- O'Sullivan with the San Francisco 49ers in 2008

No. 4, 7, 14, 0
- Position: Quarterback

Personal information
- Born: August 25, 1979 (age 47); Burbank, California, U.S.
- Listed height: 6 ft 2 in (1.88 m)
- Listed weight: 232 lb (105 kg)

Career information
- High school: Jesuit (Carmichael, California)
- College: UC Davis (1997–2001)
- NFL draft: 2002: 6th round, 186th overall pick

Career history

Playing
- New Orleans Saints (2002–2004); → Frankfurt Galaxy (2004); Green Bay Packers (2004); Chicago Bears (2005)*; Minnesota Vikings (2005); New England Patriots (2006)*; Carolina Panthers (2006)*; Chicago Bears (2007)*; → Frankfurt Galaxy (2007); Detroit Lions (2007); San Francisco 49ers (2008); Cincinnati Bengals (2009); San Diego Chargers (2010); Oakland Raiders (2010); Saskatchewan Roughriders (2012)
- * Offseason or practice squad member only

Coaching
- Patrick Henry High School (2019–2021) Head coach

Awards and highlights
- All-NFL Europa (2007); NFL Europa Co-Offensive MVP (2007); NFL Europa passing yards leader (2007); NFL Europa passer rating leader (2007); NFL Europa passer touchdowns co-leader (2007); First-team All-American (2000); Second-team All-American (2001)

Career NFL statistics
- Passing attempts: 257
- Passing completions: 145
- Completion percentage: 56.4%
- TD–INT: 9–13
- Passing yards: 1,866
- Passer rating: 69.9
- Stats at Pro Football Reference

John Thomas O'Sullivan (born August 25, 1979) is an American former professional football player who was a quarterback for nine seasons in the National Football League (NFL), two seasons in NFL Europe and one season in the Canadian Football League (CFL). He played college football for the UC Davis Aggies of the University of California, Davis, where he was a three-year starter and threw for career totals of 10,745 yards and 96 touchdowns. He was named a first-team All-American in 2000 and a second-team All-American in 2001. He was inducted into the Cal Aggie Athletics Hall of Fame in 2008.

O'Sullivan was selected by the New Orleans Saints in the sixth round of the 2002 NFL draft. He also spent time with 10 other NFL teams: the Green Bay Packers, Chicago Bears, Minnesota Vikings, New England Patriots, Carolina Panthers, Detroit Lions, San Francisco 49ers, Cincinnati Bengals, San Diego Chargers, and Oakland Raiders. He was a backup for the majority of his NFL career but began the 2008 season as the starter for the 49ers. He also played for the Frankfurt Galaxy of NFL Europe in 2004 and 2007, leading the Galaxy to the World Bowl each year. He earned All-NFL Europa and NFL Europa Co-Offensive MVP honors in 2007. O'Sullivan spent the final season of his professional career as a backup for the Saskatchewan Roughriders of the CFL.

In 2018, he started the YouTube channel "The QB School", where he analyzes quarterbacks. He was the head football coach of Patrick Henry High School in San Diego from 2019 to 2021.

== Early life ==
John Thomas O'Sullivan was born on August 25, 1979, in Burbank, California. He attended Jesuit High School in Carmichael, California, where he played football and baseball. In football, he was a two-time All-Metro League selection and led his school to a Sac-Joaquin Section crown in 1995. He was also team captain his senior year. O'Sullivan also set school records for single-season passing yards with 1,794 during his senior year and career passing yards with 3,500. In baseball, he played catcher and earned all-league honors. He had a .450 batting average his senior season. O'Sullivan graduated from Jesuit High School in 1997.

== College career ==
O'Sullivan was a four-year letterman for the UC Davis Aggies, who competed in NCAA Division II at the time, of the University of California, Davis from 1998 to 2001. He was redshirted in 1997 and was a backup his redshirt freshman year in 1998. He was a starter his final three seasons.

As a sophomore in 1999, O'Sullivan completed 208 of 341 passes for 3,217 yards and 26 touchdowns with 16 interceptions. He was also named an Honorable Mention All-American by Don Hansen's Football Gazette and was voted most improved player by his teammates in 1999.

As a junior in 2000, he threw for 3,679 yards and a school single-season record 38 touchdown passes as the Aggies advanced to the Division II semifinals, where they lost to Bloomsburg by a score of 58–48. O'Sullivan had a 193.85 passer rating and was the only Division II player to receive a Heisman Trophy vote that season. He was named a third-team Little All-American by the Associated Press, a second-team All-American by both Don Hansen's Football Gazette and Daktronics, and a first-team All-American by D2Football.com He was also named first-team All-West Region by Daktronics. O'Sullivan was a finalist for the Harlon Hill Trophy and a team co-captain as well. He was co-winner of the Jerry Norris Award in 2000 as the team's most valuable and inspirational player.

As a senior in 2001, he completed 255 of 406 passes for 32 touchdowns and a school single-season record 3,826 yards as the Aggies advanced to the Division II semifinals, where they lost to North Dakota by a score of 14–2. O'Sullivan was named a second-team All-American by both D2Football.com and Daktronics, and an Honorable Mention All-American by Don Hansen's Football Gazette. For the second year in a row, he was both a finalist for the Harlon Hill Trophy and a team co-captain. He was the first UC Davis player to twice be on the final ballot for the Harlon Hill Trophy. He also won the school's Colby E. "Babe" Slater Award for Male Athlete of Year in 2001. O'Sullivan played in the 2002 East–West Shrine Game.

He completed 669 of 1,070 passes for 10,745 yards and 96 touchdowns with 41 interceptions during his college career. He also set the school record for total offense with 11,544 yards.

O'Sullivan set a Division II record for touchdown passes in a playoff game with six, set on November 25, 2000, against Mesa State. He also set a Division II record for most consecutive games with a touchdown pass. He was Chapter President of the Phi Delta Theta chapter at UC Davis as well. O'Sullivan graduated with a Bachelor of Arts in English. He was inducted into the Cal Aggie Athletics Hall of Fame in 2008. In 2009, he was the recipient of the school's Young Alumnus Award.

== Professional career ==
O'Sullivan had a long career, predominantly in the NFL, as a journeyman quarterback.

Pre-draft measurables
Height	Weight	40-yard dash	10-yard split	20-yard split	20-yard shuttle	Three-cone drill	Vertical jump	Broad jump	Wonderlic
6 ft 2 in (1.88 m)	223 lb (101 kg)	4.91 s	1.68 s	2.83 s	4.28 s	7.46 s	29 in (0.74 m)	8 ft 11 in (2.72 m)	35
All values from NFL Combine

=== New Orleans Saints and Frankfurt Galaxy ===
O'Sullivan was selected by the New Orleans Saints in the sixth round of the 2002 NFL draft with the 186th overall pick. He signed a three-year contract worth $973,000 with the Saints on July 25, 2002. The deal included a $68,000 signing bonus. He was inactive as the third quarterback for all 16 regular season games in 2002. O'Sullivan was released by the Saints on September 16, 2003. He re-signed with the Saints on September 21. He was again inactive as the third quarterback for all 16 regular season games in 2003.

O'Sullivan was allocated to NFL Europe on January 27, 2004, where he played for the Frankfurt Galaxy during the 2004 season. He started eight games for the Galaxy in 2004, completing 120 of 196 passes for 1,527 yards, ten touchdowns and five interceptions with a record of 6–2 as the starter. His 91.9 passer rating was also second best in the league. O'Sullivan missed the final two games of the regular season due to his father's death. The Galaxy finished the year with a 7–3 regular season record, which granted them a berth in World Bowl XII. In World Bowl XII, against the Berlin Thunder, he completed 19 of 33 passes for 210 yards and 3 touchdowns with 2 interceptions in the 30–24 loss.

He was inactive as the Saints' third quarterback for the first four games of the 2004 season.

=== Green Bay Packers ===
O'Sullivan and a second round pick in the 2005 NFL draft were traded to the Green Bay Packers for Mike McKenzie on October 4, 2004. After the trade, O'Sullivan was inactive for 11 games as the third quarterback. He then played the first regular season game of his career on January 2, 2005, in the season finale, when he took a knee twice to end the game. He was also inactive for the team's Wild Card Round playoff game. O'Sullivan re-signed with the Packers on April 22, 2005. He was released by the team on September 3, 2005.

=== Chicago Bears (first stint) ===
O'Sullivan was signed to the Chicago Bears' practice squad on September 5, 2005.

=== Minnesota Vikings ===
He was signed off the Bears' practice squad by the Minnesota Vikings on November 8, 2005, after Daunte Culpepper suffered a season-ending injury. He was then inactive as the Vikings third quarterback for the final eight games of the season. O'Sullivan was released by the Vikings on September 2, 2006.

=== New England Patriots ===
He was signed to the New England Patriots' practice squad on September 5, 2006. He was released by the team on October 2, 2006.

=== Carolina Panthers ===
O'Sullivan was signed to the Carolina Panthers' practice squad in December 2006.

=== Second stint with Bears and Galaxy ===
In February 2007, he signed with the Bears. O'Sullivan was assigned to the Frankfurt Galaxy of NFL Europa on February 24, 2007. In 2007, he completed 174 of 254 passes for 2,201 yards, 16 touchdowns, and 7 interceptions with a 104.8 passer rating. He led the league in passer rating and passing yards while also tying Casey Bramlet for the league lead in touchdown passes. O'Sullivan recorded the league's only two 300 passing yards games of the 2007 season and threw for 374 yards in Week 9 against the Hamburg Sea Devils. On June 21, 2007, O'Sullivan and Cologne Centurions running back Derrick Ross were named the 2007 NFL Europa Co-Offensive MVPs. They both earned All-NFL Europa honors as well. He started all ten of the team's games, leading them to a 7–3 record and a berth in World Bowl XV, which the Galaxy lost to the Hamburg Sea Devils by a score of 37–28. He completed 23 of 39 passes for 299 yards and two touchdowns with one interception in World Bowl XV.

O'Sullivan was released by the Bears in July 2007.

=== Detroit Lions ===
O'Sullivan signed a one-year contract with the Detroit Lions in July 2007. Due to injuries to Detroit's other two quarterbacks, Dan Orlovsky and starter Jon Kitna, O'Sullivan played the Lions' final two 2007 preseason games in their entirety. O'Sullivan was the primary backup to Kitna in 2007. On September 16, Kitna suffered a concussion early in the second quarter against the Vikings and was relieved by O'Sullivan, who was making his second career regular season appearance. He then completed 13 of 24 passes for 148 yards, two interceptions and his first career touchdown, which was a seven-yarder to Calvin Johnson, before Kitna returned to the game midway through the fourth quarter. The Lions won 20–17 in overtime. O'Sullivan played in four games for the Lions in 2007, recording season passing totals of 13 completions, 26 attempts, 148 yards, one touchdown, and two interceptions.

=== San Francisco 49ers ===
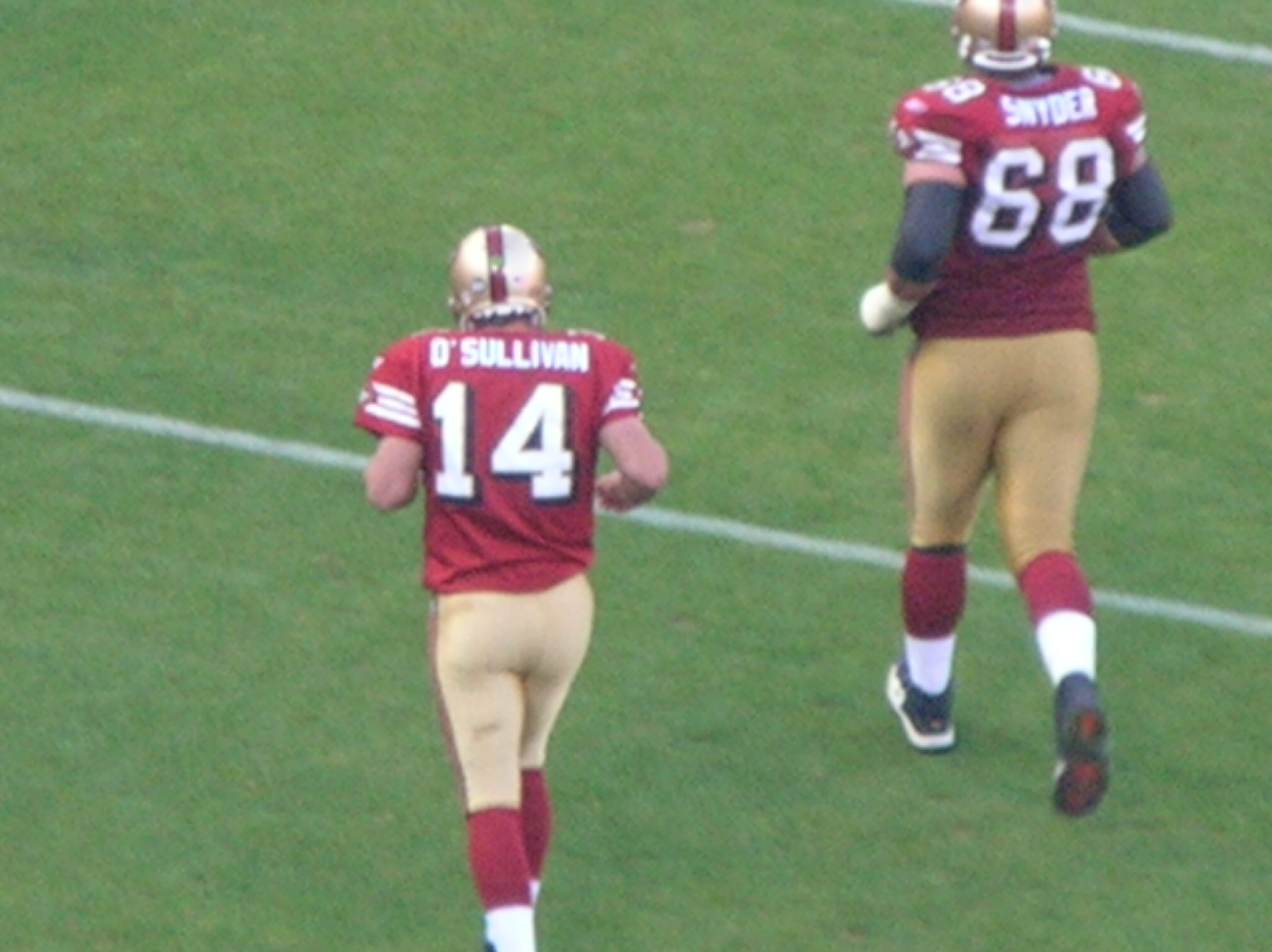
O'Sullivan and Adam Snyder in 2008

After hiring O'Sullivan's former offensive coordinator with the Lions, Mike Martz, the San Francisco 49ers signed O'Sullivan to a one-year contract for the veteran's minimum of $645,000 on February 29, 2008. On August 12, head coach Mike Nolan appeared on a local radio show and announced that O'Sullivan had moved into the lead for the 49ers starting quarterback job.

On August 22, Nolan officially declared O'Sullivan as the starting quarterback for the 2008 season. He became the first 49ers quarterback to throw for over 300 yards in a game since 2004 when he completed 20 of 32 passes for 321 yards and a touchdown in a 33–30 win over the Seattle Seahawks on September 14. O'Sullivan completed 16 of 28 passes for 256 yards, one touchdown and two interceptions in a 29–17 loss to the New York Giants on October 19. He was also sacked six times and fumbled four times, but only lost one fumble. Afterwards, Nolan said that the play of O'Sullivan in the Giants game was "disappointing". On October 26, O'Sullivan, after throwing an interception that was returned for a touchdown, was benched in favor of Shaun Hill by new head coach Mike Singletary during the second quarter of a game against the Seahawks. O'Sullivan committed three turnovers in total during the Seahawks game, the interception and two fumbles.

At the time of his benching, O'Sullivan and Brett Favre were tied for the league lead in interceptions with 11 and O'Sullivan led the league in fumbles with 11. He also led the league in total turnovers with 11 interceptions and six fumbles lost. O'Sullivan, by himself, had committed more turnovers than any other NFL team at the time of his demotion. The Denver Broncos, New York Jets and Cincinnati Bengals were tied for the second most turnovers with 16. On October 27, Singletary named Hill the starting quarterback. Hill then started the final eight games of the season. O'Sullivan completed 128 of 220 passes for 1,678 yards and eight touchdowns with 11 interceptions during the 2008 season. The 49ers won two out of the eight games that he started. O'Sullivan, despite only starting eight games, was sacked 32 times, which made him tied for eighth in the NFL with Joe Flacco in number of times sacked.

=== Cincinnati Bengals ===
An unrestricted free agent in the 2009 offseason, O'Sullivan signed a two-year contract with the Cincinnati Bengals in March 2009. He was active as the Bengals second quarterback for every regular season game during the 2009 season. He played in three games, completing four of eleven passes for 40 yards with no touchdowns or interceptions. O'Sullivan was also active, but did not play, in the team's AFC wild card game. He was released by the Bengals on September 5, 2010.

=== San Diego Chargers ===
After O'Sullivan was cut by the Bengals, the San Diego Chargers claimed him off waivers on September 6, 2010. He was inactive as the Chargers third quarterback for six games. He was released by the team on October 20, 2010. In November 2010, he had workouts with the Miami Dolphins and Detroit Lions.

=== Oakland Raiders ===
O'Sullivan was signed by the Oakland Raiders on December 2, 2010, after quarterback Bruce Gradkowski was placed on season-ending injured reserve. He was inactive as the Raiders third quarterback for five games. The Raiders were the last NFL team he played for. He became a free agent in July 2011.

=== Saskatchewan Roughriders ===
O'Sullivan was signed by the Saskatchewan Roughriders of the Canadian Football League on April 19, 2012. He was the team's third-string quarterback for most of the season, behind starter Darian Durant and rookie Drew Willy. O'Sullivan dressed for all 18 of the team's games in 2012, but played in just one game, completing nine of fourteen passes for 83 yards and rushing once for four yards. He was released by the Roughriders on March 8, 2013.

== NFL career statistics ==
=== Regular season ===
Year	Team	Games			Passing								Rushing				Sacks		Fumbles (Note: Fumbles lost data taken from Pro Football Reference career game log)	
Year	Team	GP	GS	Record	Cmp	Att	Pct	Yds	Y/A	TD	Int	Rtg	Att	Yds	Avg	TD	Sck	SckY	Fum	Lost
2002	NO	0	0	DNP																
2003	NO	0	0	DNP																
2004	NO	0	0	DNP																
2004	GB	1	0	–	0	0	0.0	0	0.0	0	0	0.0	2	−2	−1.0	0	0	0	0	0
2005	MIN	0	0	DNP																
2007	DET	4	0	–	13	26	50.0	148	5.7	1	2	48.2	4	−10	−2.5	0	3	18	3	1
2008	SF	9	8	2–6	128	220	58.2	1,678	7.6	8	11	73.6	30	145	4.8	0	32	197	11	6
2009	CIN	3	0	–	4	11	36.4	40	3.6	0	0	47.5	3	12	4.0	0	3	31	2	2
2010	SD	0	0	DNP																
2010	OAK	0	0	DNP																
Career		17	8	2–6	145	257	56.4	1,866	7.3	9	13	69.9	39	145	3.7	0	38	246	16	9

=== Playoffs ===
Year	Team	Games			Passing								Rushing				Sacks		Fumbles	
Year	Team	GP	GS	Record	Cmp	Att	Pct	Yds	Y/A	TD	Int	Rtg	Att	Yds	Avg	TD	Sck	SckY	Fum	Lost
2004	GB	0	0	DNP																
2009	CIN	0	0	DNP																

== Post-playing career ==
O'Sullivan spent time as a member of the compliance staff of San Diego State University's athletic department He completed his Ph.D. in Leadership studies at the University of San Diego in 2017.

In 2018, O'Sullivan started the YouTube channel "The QB School", where he analyzes game tape of college and professional quarterbacks. He was the head football coach of Patrick Henry High School in San Diego from 2019 to 2021, accruing a 20–10 record.
