= Clinton McDonald =

American football player (born 1987)

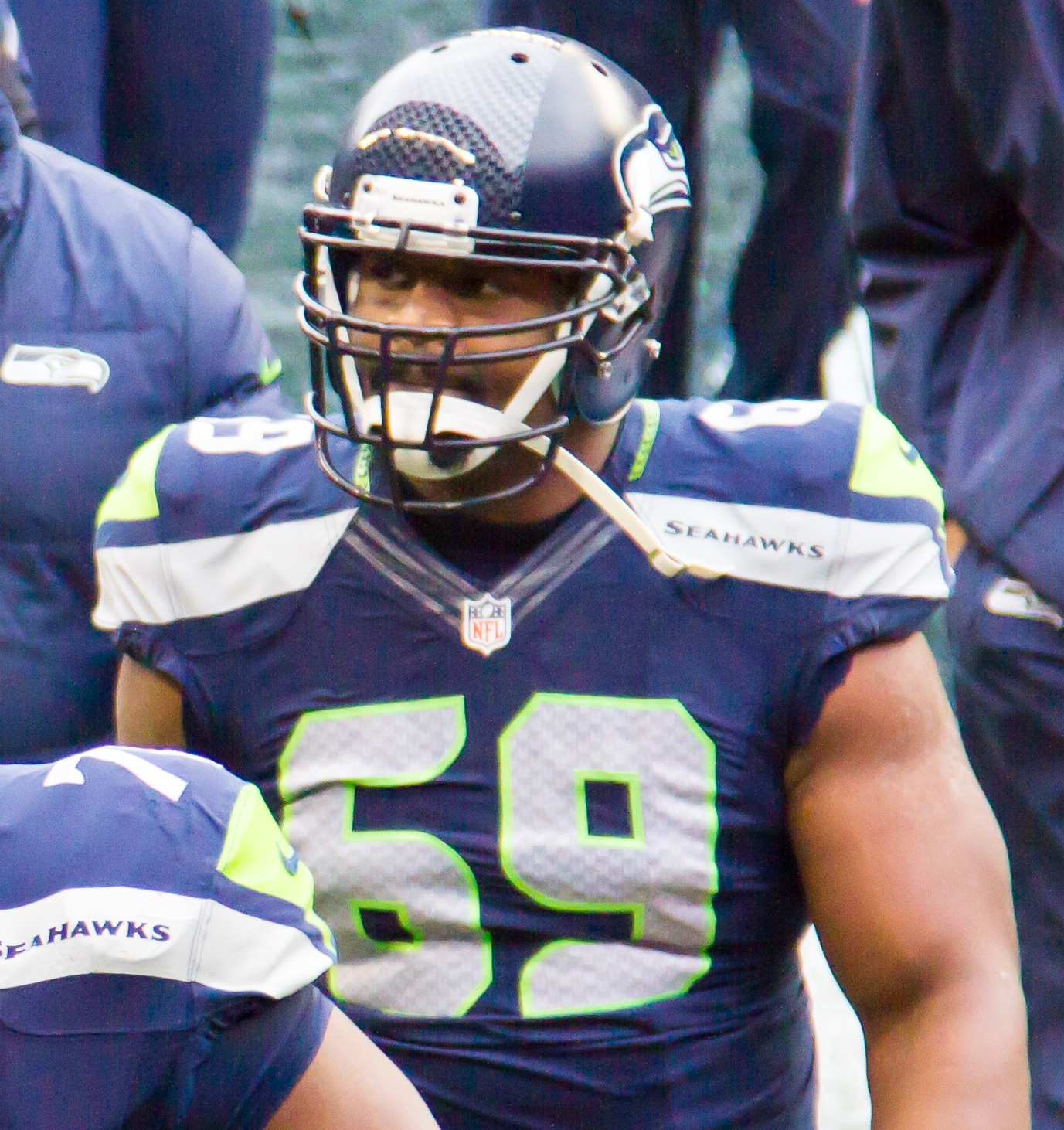
- McDonald with the Seattle Seahawks in 2013

No. 69, 98, 97, 93
- Position: Defensive end

Personal information
- Born: January 6, 1987 (age 39); Jacksonville, Arkansas, U.S.
- Listed height: 6 ft 2 in (1.88 m)
- Listed weight: 297 lb (135 kg)

Career information
- High school: Jacksonville
- College: Memphis (2005–2008)
- NFL draft: 2009: 7th round, 249th overall pick

Career history
- Cincinnati Bengals (2009–2010); Seattle Seahawks (2011–2013); Tampa Bay Buccaneers (2014–2017); Denver Broncos (2018)*; Oakland Raiders (2018); Arizona Cardinals (2019)
- * Offseason or practice squad member only

Awards and highlights
- Super Bowl champion (XLVIII)

Career NFL statistics
- Total tackles: 279
- Sacks: 21.0
- Fumble recoveries: 4
- Interceptions: 2
- Pass deflections: 6
- Stats at Pro Football Reference

Clinton Myles McDonald (born January 6, 1987) is an American former professional football player who was a defensive end in the National Football League (NFL). He played college football for the Memphis Tigers and was selected by the Cincinnati Bengals in the seventh round of the 2009 NFL draft. McDonald also played in the NFL for the Seattle Seahawks, Tampa Bay Buccaneers, Denver Broncos, Oakland Raiders, and Arizona Cardinals.

== Early life ==
The son of Larry and Bonnie McDonald of Jacksonville, Arkansas, McDonald grew up in a military household as both his parents served. Clinton McDonald was a three-year letterman at Jacksonville High School, playing for Coach Johnny Watson, and was selected to the all-conference team twice while in high school. As a senior, he was selected to the Arkansas Democrat-Gazette's 5-A top prospect list, was named as 5-A Outstanding Lineman, and selected to the 5-A All-State team. McDonald also lettered in basketball and threw the shot put in track.

== College career ==
=== University of Memphis ===
2005

McDonald was one of just six true freshmen to see action in 2005, playing in all 12 games for the Tigers, primarily with the special teams unit. His first collegiate action was against Ole Miss in the season opener. McDonald logged one tackle in six contests, including wins over Chattanooga, UTEP, Marshall and Akron, and had solo stops versus Chattanooga, Tulsa and Marshall.

2006

McDonald saw action in all 12 games as a sophomore and made 10 starts on the defensive front. He opened the season as a starter with four tackles, three of which were solo stops, against Ole Miss. He recorded back-to-back games of five tackles versus Chattanooga and East Carolina, tallied two stops against Tennessee and one versus UAB, registering a season-high six tackles in the Tulsa contest. He totaled four tackles against Southern Miss and five versus Houston, recovering his first fumble against the Cougars while also being credited with a pass breakup. McDonald scooped up the fumble forced by Corey Mills on Houston's first possession of the third quarter. Against UTEP, he equaled his season high with six tackles, which included one and a half tackles for a loss of eight yards, and blocked a Reagan Schneider 26-yard field goal attempt that would have closed UTEP's deficit to one point heading into the locker room at the half. He also was assisted by Rubio Phillips in dropping UTEP QB Jordan Palmer for a loss of seven yards on 3rd down and 14, forcing UTEP to punt. McDonald ended the year ranked ninth on the team in tackles with 41 and was one of just two Tigers to block a kick for the season.

2007

McDonald was selected as a permanent captain by his teammates prior to the New Orleans Bowl, becoming the only Tiger under coach Tommy West to be selected as a captain as a junior. He was named the 2007 Memphis Defensive Co-Player of the Year at the team's postseason banquet, and was an honorable mention All-Conference USA pick in 2007. He started all 13 games on the defensive front, extending a streak of 37 straight games played. He led the team in tackles for loss with 9.5 for minus 31 yards, registered a team-high four sacks for minus 22 yards, and also ranked fifth on the team in tackles with 55. McDonald opened the season with five tackles, including one for a loss against Ole Miss, sacking QB Seth Adams for a loss of four yards in the second quarter. He logged his second career fumble recovery and had five tackles against Jacksonville State, falling on a fumble forced by Steven Turner in the fourth quarter at the Memphis 27-yard line. He tallied four tackles in each of the next three games versus UCF, Arkansas State and Marshall. McDonald forced his first career fumble against Middle Tennessee and had two tackles with a tackle for loss of two yards, causing MTSU's Dwight Dasher to fumble at the Memphis 41-yard line in the fourth quarter. He was credited with a career-high 10 tackles against East Carolina and assisted on a tackle for loss. McDonald logged four tackles against Southern Miss with two resulting in lost yardage, including a sack for minus four yards on QB Jeremy Young, halting a potential USM touchdown early in the fourth quarter, forcing a 4th-and-12 from the Memphis 17. He totaled two tackles with one for a loss of two yards and forced a fumble against UAB. McDonald served as one of the team captains against SMU, garnering two tackles with a sack for a loss of six yards on QB Justin Willis in the third quarter. McDonald led the Tigers in tackles in the New Orleans Bowl with eight, including two tackles for loss, one of which was a sack for minus eight yards. For the season, he totaled four games of five or more tackles and logged a sack in three of the final four games. He was named 2007 Co-Defensive Player of the Year at the team banquet, and was an honorable mention All-Conference USA pick.

2008

McDonald played in 11 of 13 games with 10 starts at defensive tackle. He did not play against ECU and SMU because of an ankle injury suffered early in the Louisville game, ending his consecutive game playing streak at 44. He ranked 37th nationally in sacks/game, and his four sacks against ASU tied for the highest single-game total in the NCAA FBS (Division 1) in 2008, and tied a school record, becoming the first UM player to have four sacks in a game since 1994. He finished third in the Conference USA in sacks and tied for 20th in tackles for loss. McDonald led the team in sacks, was 2nd in tackles for loss, and 7th in tackles. McDonald was on the preseason Lombardi Award Watch List. Honors included being selected to the 2008 All-Conference USA First-team and being named Conference USA Defensive Player of the Week following the 2008 ASU game. McDonald received one of the Glenn Jones Awards at the 2008 Blue-Gray Game, and started for the East Team in the 2009 East-West Shrine Game.

College career highs

- Most tackles: 10 vs. ECU (07)
- Most solo tackles: 4 vs. UTEP (06), FAU (07)
- Most assisted tackles: 7 vs. ECU (07)
- Most tackles for loss: 2, three times, last vs. FAU (07)
- Most sacks: 1, four times, last vs. FAU (07)
- Most forced fumbles: 1 vs. MTSU, UAB (07)
- Most fumble recoveries: 1 vs. Houston (06), JSU (07)
- Most blocked kicks: 1 vs. UTEP (06)

== Professional career ==
=== Pre-draft ===
McDonald's Pro Day was on March 27, 2009. His results were as follows.

Pre-draft measurables
| Height | Weight | 40-yard dash | 10-yard split | 20-yard split | 20-yard shuttle | Three-cone drill | Vertical jump | Broad jump | Bench press |
|---|---|---|---|---|---|---|---|---|---|
| 6 ft 1 3/4 in (1.87 m) | 283 lb (128 kg) | 4.83 s | 1.63 s | 2.81 s | 4.50 s | 7.25 s | 38 in (0.97 m) | 10 ft 1 in (3.07 m) | 36 reps |
All values from Memphis Pro Day

Shortly after his Pro Day, McDonald was invited for personal workouts by Seattle, Jacksonville and Cincinnati, making it to Seattle and Jacksonville. A conflict prevented him from making it to Cincinnati. According to McDonald, his injury and missed playing time during his senior year likely kept him from being invited to the NFL Combine.

"After Arkansas State, I felt I would get invited. Even though I got hurt, my numbers were up there with the top people in nation. I heard coaches were impressed looking at me. When I didn't get invited, I didn't get down on myself. I felt there was a reason. I think God wanted me to train longer, to work harder." His agent, New York-based Neil Schwartz, told him his Pro Day workout boosted his draft status. Tony Pauline of TFYDraft.com was quoted as saying that McDonald would probably be, "one of the most underrated players in the draft."

=== Cincinnati Bengals ===
McDonald was selected by the Cincinnati Bengals in the seventh round of the 2009 NFL draft, the 249th pick overall. McDonald failed to make the final roster as a rookie, and was waived on September 5, 2009, before re-signing to the practice squad the following day where he remained all season. He was invited to the Bengals training camp in 2010, but was waived by Cincinnati following training camp on September 4, 2010, again re-signing to its practice squad the following day. McDonald was signed to the Bengals active roster November 8, 2010, and played in a total of 8 games, registering 4 tackles. To make room for him on the roster, the Bengals placed cornerback Rico Murray on waivers.

=== Seattle Seahawks ===
He was traded to the Seattle Seahawks on August 29, 2011 for Kelly Jennings, who had just signed a one-year, $1.8 million deal with the Seahawks. In 2011, McDonald played in 15 games, with one start, the first of his career, against the Washington Redskins (11/27) in place of Alan Branch. He played in 14 games in 2012 as a much-used backup along the defensive line, totaling 25 tackles, 17 of which were solo. He also played in both postseason games (at Washington and at Atlanta) and had 3 tackles (1 solo) along with 1 fumble recovery. On September 14, 2013, he was re-signed with the team on a one-year contract for $630,000. McDonald recorded his first career NFL interception on November 17, 2013, picking off QB Matt Cassel and returning it 3 yards in a 41-20 victory over the Minnesota Vikings.

=== Tampa Bay Buccaneers ===
On March 11, 2014, McDonald reached an agreement on a four-year, $12M deal with the Tampa Bay Buccaneers. The signing reunited him with former Bengals teammate Michael Johnson, who signed with the Bucs earlier in the offseason. After a good training camp, McDonald was named starting defensive tackle alongside Gerald McCoy. His debut season with the Buccaneers has been a productive season with 46 total tackles, 35 solo tackles, 5 sacks, and 1 interception before injuries prematurely shortened his debut campaign.

=== Denver Broncos ===
On March 21, 2018, McDonald signed a two-year contract with the Denver Broncos. He was released by the Broncos on September 1, 2018.

=== Oakland Raiders ===
On September 13, 2018, McDonald signed with the Oakland Raiders.

=== Arizona Cardinals ===
On August 26, 2019, McDonald signed with the Arizona Cardinals. He was placed on injured reserve on November 6, 2019 with a neck injury.

=== NFL statistics ===
| Year | Team | Games | | Tackles | | | | | Interceptions | | | | | | Fumbles | |
| Year | Team | GP | GS | Comb | Total | Ast | Sack | Safety | PDef | Int | Yds | Avg | Lng | TD | FF | FR |
|---|---|---|---|---|---|---|---|---|---|---|---|---|---|---|---|---|
| 2010 | CIN | 8 | 0 | 4 | 2 | 2 | 0.0 | 0 | 0 | 0 | 0 | 0.0 | 0 | 0 | 0 | 0 |
| 2011 | SEA | 15 | 1 | 35 | 21 | 14 | 0.0 | 0 | 0 | 0 | 0 | 0.0 | 0 | 0 | 0 | 1 |
| 2012 | SEA | 14 | 0 | 25 | 17 | 8 | 0.0 | 0 | 1 | 0 | 0 | 0.0 | 0 | 0 | 0 | 0 |
| 2013 | SEA | 15 | 1 | 35 | 19 | 16 | 5.5 | 0 | 2 | 1 | 3 | 3.0 | 3 | 0 | 0 | 1 |
| 2014 | TB | 13 | 13 | 45 | 34 | 11 | 5.0 | 0 | 2 | 1 | 3 | 3.0 | 3 | 0 | 0 | 2 |
| 2015 | TB | 6 | 6 | 31 | 21 | 10 | 0.0 | 0 | 0 | 0 | 0 | 0.0 | 0 | 0 | 0 | 0 |
| 2016 | TB | 12 | 12 | 36 | 25 | 11 | 3.5 | 0 | 0 | 0 | 0 | 0.0 | 0 | 0 | 0 | 0 |
| 2017 | TB | 14 | 3 | 29 | 18 | 11 | 5.0 | 0 | 1 | 0 | 0 | 0.0 | 0 | 0 | 0 | 0 |
| Career | | 97 | 36 | 240 | 157 | 83 | 19.0 | 0 | 6 | 2 | 6 | 3.0 | 3 | 0 | 0 | 4 |

== Personal life ==
McDonald is a member of the Xi Zeta chapter of Omega Psi Phi fraternity.
