= James Johnson (running back) =

American football player (born 1984)

No. 39, 41
- Position: Running back

Personal information
- Born: September 6, 1984 (age 42); Baton Rouge, Louisiana, U.S.
- Listed height: 5 ft 11 in (1.80 m)
- Listed weight: 205 lb (93 kg)

Career information
- High school: Thomas Jefferson (Port Arthur, Texas)
- College: Kansas State
- NFL draft: 2008: undrafted

Career history
- Cincinnati Bengals (2008–2009); Minnesota Vikings (2010)*; Cincinnati Bengals (2010)*; Green Bay Packers (2010)*; Pittsburgh Steelers (2011)*
- * Offseason or practice squad member only

Awards and highlights
- First-team NJCAA All-American (2004); SWJCFC Offensive MVP (2004); Second-team All-Big 12 (2007)

Career NFL statistics
- Carries: 9
- Rushing yards: 29
- Touchdowns: 0
- Stats at Pro Football Reference

James Johnson (born September 6, 1984, in New Orleans, Louisiana) is an American former professional football player who was a running back in the National Football League (NFL). He was signed by the Cincinnati Bengals as an undrafted free agent in 2008. He played college football for the Kansas State Wildcats.

Johnson was also a member of the Minnesota Vikings, Green Bay Packers and Pittsburgh Steelers.

== Professional career ==
=== Cincinnati Bengals (first stint) ===
Johnson was promoted from the Cincinnati Bengals practice squad late in the 2008 season. He saw action in the last two games of the season, carrying the ball nine times for 29 yards. He also caught six passes for 47 yards.

He spent the 2009 season on the practice squad.

=== Minnesota Vikings ===
On January 22, 2010, Johnson signed a future contract with the Minnesota Vikings after his practice squad contract expired at season's end. He was waived on June 14.

=== Cincinnati Bengals (second stint) ===
On Tuesday August 10, 2010, he was again signed by the Bengals in the wake of injuries to running backs Brian Leonard and Cordera Eason-(C.E. subsequently released on waivers).

=== Green Bay Packers ===
On September 6, 2010, he was signed by the Green Bay Packers to their practice squad.

=== Pittsburgh Steelers ===
Johnson signed a reserve/future contract with the Pittsburgh Steelers on January 11, 2011. He was waived on September 3, 2011.
