= Rashad Jeanty =

American football player (born 1983)

No. 93, 53
- Position: Defensive lineman

Personal information
- Born: April 17, 1983 (age 43); Miami, Florida, U.S.
- Listed height: 6 ft 2 in (1.88 m)
- Listed weight: 247 lb (112 kg)

Career information
- College: UCF

Career history
- 2002–2005: Edmonton Eskimos
- 2006–2009: Cincinnati Bengals
- 2011: Philadelphia Eagles*
- 2012: Edmonton Eskimos
- * Offseason or practice squad member only

Awards and highlights
- 2× Grey Cup Champion (2003, 2005)

Career statistics
- Total tackles: 217
- Forced fumbles: 5
- Fumble recoveries: 4
- Pass deflections: 5
- Stats at Pro Football Reference
- Stats at CFL.ca (archive)

Rashad Jeanty (born April 17, 1983) is an American former professional football player who was a defensive lineman in the National Football League (NFL) and Canadian Football League (CFL). He was signed by the CFL's Edmonton Eskimos after he went undrafted in 2002. After playing four seasons with the Eskimos, he signed with the Cincinnati Bengals of the NFL in 2006. He was also a member of the Philadelphia Eagles during the offseason in 2011. He played college football for the UCF Knights.

== Early life ==
Jeanty is of Haitian descent. He attended Carol City High School, where he was rated the 14th-best player in the nation and sixth-best in Florida by The Miami Herald.

== College career ==
Jeanty played for two seasons at the University of Central Florida, from 2000–2001, logging 9.5 sacks and 137 tackles in 22 games. In 2001, he earned the second team All-Freshman honors from The Football News and was named to The Sporting News third-team Freshman All-America team.

== Professional career ==
=== Edmonton Eskimos ===
Jeanty played three seasons on the Edmonton Eskimos, from 2002–2005, primarily as a defensive end. He won the Grey Cup Championship with Edmonton in 2003 and 2005.

=== Cincinnati Bengals ===
Due to an injury to David Pollack, Jeanty was tabbed to start at SLB in his NFL debut on September 10, 2006 at Kansas City. He was the only undrafted rookie in an NFL starting lineup on kickoff weekend. He had two tackles in the Bengals' 23-10 win. He also had a key special teams play, as his recovery of muffed punt by Dante Hall at the Chiefs 14-yard line was an early momentum-shifter, leading to a Bengals field goal that tied game 3-3. He played in every game in 2006 except games 4-7 due to a foot injury.

On January 9, 2010, Jeanty fractured his left fibula on the opening kickoff of a Wild Card playoff game against the New York Jets, ending his season. He was waived by the Bengals on August 30, 2010 after failing his physical with the team.

=== Philadelphia Eagles ===
On February 20, 2011, Jeanty was signed by the Philadelphia Eagles to a one-year contract. He was released on September 2, 2011 during final cuts.

=== Second stint with the Eskimos ===
Jeanty was signed by the Edmonton Eskimos on February 6, 2012, re-joining the team after a six-year absence.
