= Dan Santucci =

American football player (born 1983)

No. 65
- Position: Center

Personal information
- Born: September 6, 1983 (age 43); Chicago, Illinois, U.S.
- Listed height: 6 ft 4 in (1.93 m)
- Listed weight: 304 lb (138 kg)

Career information
- High school: St. Patrick (Chicago)
- College: Notre Dame
- NFL draft: 2007: 7th round, 230th overall pick

Career history
- Cincinnati Bengals (2007)*; Indianapolis Colts (2007)*; Cincinnati Bengals (2007–2009); Kansas City Chiefs (2010)*; Carolina Panthers (2010)*
- * Offseason or practice squad member only

Career NFL statistics
- Games played: 2
- Games started: 0
- Stats at Pro Football Reference

Dan Santucci (born September 6, 1983) is an American former professional football player who was a center in the National Football League (NFL). He was selected by the Cincinnati Bengals in the seventh round of the 2007 NFL draft. He played college football for the Notre Dame Fighting Irish.

== Early life ==
Santucci attended St.Patrick High School in Chicago where he played both Defensive End and Tight End. In his last two years he made 120 tackles and 14 sacks as well as catching 38 passes for 475 yards and seven touchdowns. He also went to St. Francis Borgia grammar school.

== College career ==
Santucci attended the University of Notre Dame where he played college football in NCAA Division One. He was then selected by the Cincinnati Bengals in the seventh round of the 2007 NFL draft.

== Professional career ==
Pre-draft measurables
Height	Weight	40-yard dash	10-yard split	20-yard split	20-yard shuttle	Three-cone drill	Vertical jump	Broad jump	Bench press
6 ft 3 in (1.91 m)	301 lb (137 kg)	5.15 s	1.77 s	2.99 s	4.74 s	7.47 s	29 in (0.74 m)	8 ft 6 in (2.59 m)	23 reps
All values from NFL Combine

=== Cincinnati Bengals ===
Santucci was selected by the Cincinnati Bengals in the seventh round (230th overall) of the 2007 NFL draft. He made his NFL debut at the Cleveland Browns on September 16.

Santucci was waived/injured on August 18, 2009, and subsequently reverted to injured reserve.

He was waived on July 22, 2010.

=== Kansas City Chiefs ===
Santucci signed with the Kansas City Chiefs for pre-season on August 7, 2010. Santucci was cut by the Kansas City Chiefs after the final pre-season game.

=== Carolina Panthers ===
Santucci was signed to the Carolina Panthers practice squad and became a free agent after the season.
