= Brandon Johnson (linebacker) =

American football player (born 1983)

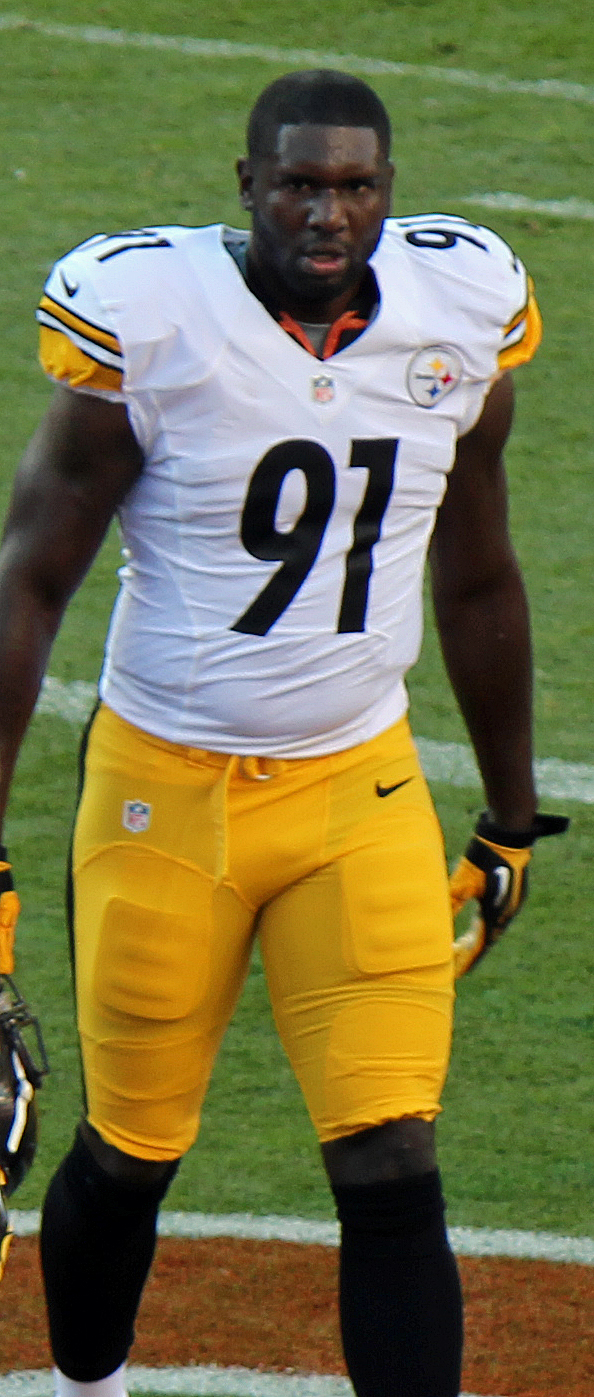
- Johnson in 2012

No. 59, 91
- Position: Linebacker

Personal information
- Born: April 5, 1983 (age 43); Birmingham, Alabama, U.S.
- Listed height: 6 ft 5 in (1.96 m)
- Listed weight: 245 lb (111 kg)

Career information
- High school: Minor (Adamsville, Alabama)
- College: Louisville
- NFL draft: 2006: 5th round, 142nd overall pick

Career history
- Arizona Cardinals (2006−2007); Cincinnati Bengals (2008−2011); Pittsburgh Steelers (2012)

Career NFL statistics
- Total tackles: 224
- Sacks: 3.5
- Forced fumbles: 1
- Fumble recoveries: 1
- Interceptions: 3
- Stats at Pro Football Reference

Brandon Johnson (born April 5, 1983) is an American former professional football player who was a linebacker in the National Football League (NFL). He played college football for the Louisville Cardinals. Johnson was selected by the Arizona Cardinals in the fifth round of the 2006 NFL draft and played for the Cincinnati Bengals and Pittsburgh Steelers. He is the co-founder with his wife of Johnson Family Foundation.

Pre-draft measurables
Height	Weight	Arm length	Hand span	40-yard dash	10-yard split	20-yard split	20-yard shuttle	Three-cone drill	Vertical jump	Broad jump	Bench press
6 ft 4 7/8 in (1.95 m)	228 lb (103 kg)	32 3/4 in (0.83 m)	10 in (0.25 m)	4.49 s	1.60 s	2.61 s	4.34 s	7.17 s	37.0 in (0.94 m)	9 ft 10 in (3.00 m)	11 reps
All values from NFL Combine
