= Morgan Trent =

American football player (born 1985)

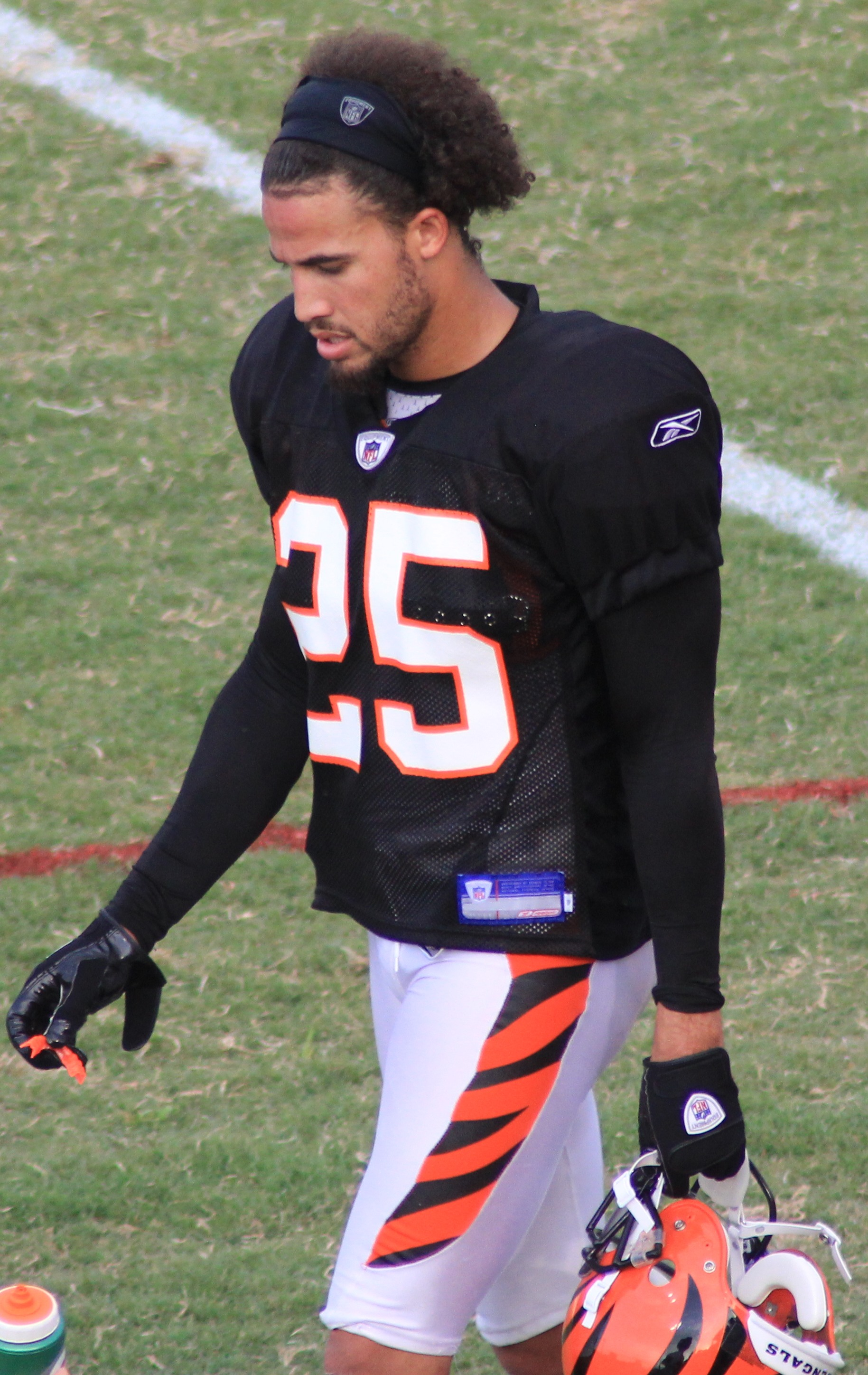
- Trent with the Cincinnati Bengals in 2011

No. 25, 26, 37
- Position: Cornerback

Personal information
- Born: December 14, 1985 (age 40); San Diego, California, U.S.
- Listed height: 6 ft 1 in (1.85 m)
- Listed weight: 184 lb (83 kg)

Career information
- High school: St. Mary's Preparatory (Orchard Lake Village, Michigan)
- College: Michigan
- NFL draft: 2009: 6th round, 179th overall pick

Career history
- Cincinnati Bengals (2009–2011); Indianapolis Colts (2011); Jacksonville Jaguars (2011); Washington Redskins (2012)*
- * Offseason or practice squad member only

Career NFL statistics
- Total tackles: 70
- Sacks: 1
- Pass deflections: 11
- Interceptions: 3
- Stats at Pro Football Reference

Morgan Trent (born December 14, 1985) is an American former professional football player who was a cornerback in the National Football League (NFL). He played college football for the Michigan Wolverines from 2005 to 2008. He was selected by the Cincinnati Bengals in the sixth round of the 2009 NFL draft. He was also a member of the Indianapolis Colts, Jacksonville Jaguars, and Washington Redskins.

== Early life ==
Trent was born in San Diego, California, but moved with his family to Brighton, Michigan. His mother, Tina Trent, was a diver at the University of Nebraska–Lincoln. And his father, Philip Trent, played cornerback at Nebraska. Trent attended Orchard Lake St. Mary's High School in Orchard Lake Village, Michigan. Trent set a school record with 23 interceptions and also caught 84 passes on offense for 1,533 yards and 16 touchdowns.

== College career ==
Trent enrolled at the University of Michigan and was redshirted as a freshman. Trent played for the scout squad in 2004 and was assigned to play the role of the opponents' speediest players, including Ohio State's Ted Ginn Jr. and Texas' Vince Young. Cornerback Ryan Mundy said of Trent, "His freshman year, it was Ohio State week, and he was playing Teddy Ginn. He would get a reverse, blaze around the corner, and I said, 'This dude is fast.'"

Trent came to Michigan as a wide receiver, but was moved to the defensive backfield during spring practice in April 2005. Trent noted, "Coach Carr thought it would be a good fit for me. So we went through the spring, and it went pretty smooth. So we decided to do the switch."

In the third game of the 2005 season, Trent snagged his first interception for the Wolverines.

During the 2006 season, developed a reputation as "a gabby, physical corner who likes to boast, among other things, that he is the most fashionable player on the team, not to mention the fastest." Asked about the transition to defense, Trent said, "I like corner, because you're out there on an island. Everybody sees you when you mess up, but everybody sees you when you make a good play, too. I really like corner. I didn't think I would, but I really do." Trent played well for most of the season, as the 2006 Wolverines began the season 10–0. However, he was criticized for giving up big plays in the team's only losses, against Ohio State and against USC in the 2007 Rose Bowl.

In 2007, Trent told reporters he had tried to grow from the criticism he received in 2006: "It makes you so strong when you go through it. It's not fun during it, while it goes, but it's worth it. You have to be thick-skinned about it, and it really has helped me grow as a player and as a person."

By 2008, Trent had gone "from being picked on to being a top cornerback." Before the 2008 season started, Trent noted, "It's been crazy, it's been a wild ride for me, you know, up and down. I think I've earned my spot for now so I'm just looking forward to keeping it and having a great year."

Following his senior year, Trent played in the January 2009 East-West Shrine Game. In four years playing for Michigan, Trent played in 48 games, including 41 as a starter. He totaled 149 tackles and 8 interceptions. His total of 31 total passes defensed ranked seventh in Wolverines history.

=== Track and field ===
In 2006, Trent also joined Michigan's track team as a sprinter. He said at the time, "Right when the football season was over, I started thinking about (running track). I've always wanted to, ever since I've been in college, but I wanted to establish myself in football first." Trent made his debut for the track team in February 2006, placing sixth in the 200 meters at the Sykes-Sabok Challenge Cup with a time of 21.72 seconds. He later posted the team's fastest 200 meters time at 21.67 seconds.

Personal bests

Event	Time (seconds)	Venue	Date
60 meters	6.83	Ann Arbor, Michigan	March 8, 2003
200 meters	21.67	University Park, Michigan	February 11, 2006

== Professional career ==
=== Cincinnati Bengals ===
Trent was selected by the Cincinnati Bengals in the 6th round of the 2009 NFL draft and signed with the team in June 2009. During the 2009 NFL season, Trent appeared in 16 games for the Bengals and had 28 tackles and a sack. In November 2009, he deflected a Ben Roethlisberger pass that was then intercepted and returned 26 yards to Pittsburgh's 14-yard line, setting up a game-tying field goal.

As a second-year player, Trent had 3 interceptions in a pre-season game against Philadelphia. He also recovered a Jimmy Clausen fumble in a September 2010 game against Carolina; he also downed a punt at Panthers four-yard line in the same game. Trent was released on November 2, 2011.

=== Indianapolis Colts ===
On November 9, 2011, Trent was signed to a contract to play the Indianapolis Colts. He was waived soon afterwards.

=== Jacksonville Jaguars ===
Trent signed with the Jacksonville Jaguars on November 30, 2011. He made two interceptions over the final five games of the 2011 season. The team waived him on June 1, 2012.

=== Washington Redskins ===
Trent was claimed off waivers by the Washington Redskins on June 2, 2012. On August 27, he was waived with an injury settlement.
