= Jason Shirley =

American football player (born 1985)

No. 71, 99
- Position: Defensive tackle

Personal information
- Born: September 30, 1985 (age 41); Fontana, California, U.S.
- Listed height: 6 ft 5 in (1.96 m)
- Listed weight: 329 lb (149 kg)

Career information
- High school: Henry J. Kaiser (Fontana)
- College: Fresno State (2003–2007)
- NFL draft: 2008: 5th round, 145th overall pick

Career history
- Cincinnati Bengals (2008–2011); Seattle Seahawks (2011); Carolina Panthers (2011); Indianapolis Colts (2012)*; Washington Redskins (2012)*; Arizona Rattlers (2013); Los Angeles Kiss (2014)
- * Offseason or practice squad member only

Career NFL statistics
- Total tackles: 8
- Sacks: 2.5
- Forced fumbles: 1
- Stats at Pro Football Reference

Jason Shirley (born September 30, 1985) is an American former professional football player who was a defensive tackle in the National Football League (NFL). He played college football for the Fresno State Bulldogs and was selected by the Cincinnati Bengals in the fifth round of the 2008 NFL draft. He was also a member of the Seattle Seahawks, Carolina Panthers, Indianapolis Colts, Washington Redskins, Arizona Rattlers and Los Angeles Kiss.

He is currently coaching youth football in Southern California.

== Professional career ==
=== Cincinnati Bengals ===
Due to a lack of depth on the offensive line, Shirley switched from defensive tackle, the position he played for his first two NFL seasons, to offensive guard during 2009 training camp. Shirley was waived by the Cincinnati Bengals on September 5, 2009. He was signed to a reserve/future contract on January 11, 2010. He was released on September 3, 2011.

=== Seattle Seahawks ===
Shirley signed with the Seattle Seahawks on October 17, 2011. He was waived on October 22.

=== Carolina Panthers ===
Shirley signed on to the Carolina Panthers' practice squad on November 8, 2011. Shirley was promoted from the practice squad on December 7, 2011. He played in the final four games for the Panthers, recording four tackles, 2.5 sacks, and one forced-fumble.

=== Indianapolis Colts ===
Shirley signed with the Indianapolis Colts on July 19, 2012. He was released by the Colts on August 31.

=== Washington Redskins ===
Shirley was signed to the practice squad of the Washington Redskins on September 3, 2012. He was released on September 11.

=== Arizona Rattlers ===
Shirley was placed on league suspension during the Arizona Rattlers ArenaBowl XXVI championship victory.

=== Los Angeles Kiss ===
Shirley was assigned to the Los Angeles Kiss on February 23, 2014.

== WWE tryout ==
On October 28, 2014, Shirley was mentioned as a participant of tryout in WWE Performance Center.

== Personal life ==
In November 2008, a Fresno (Calif.) County judge sentenced Shirley to 30 days in a work program after a jury found him guilty of drunken driving and hit and run.
