= Daniel Coats (American football) =

American football player (born 1984)

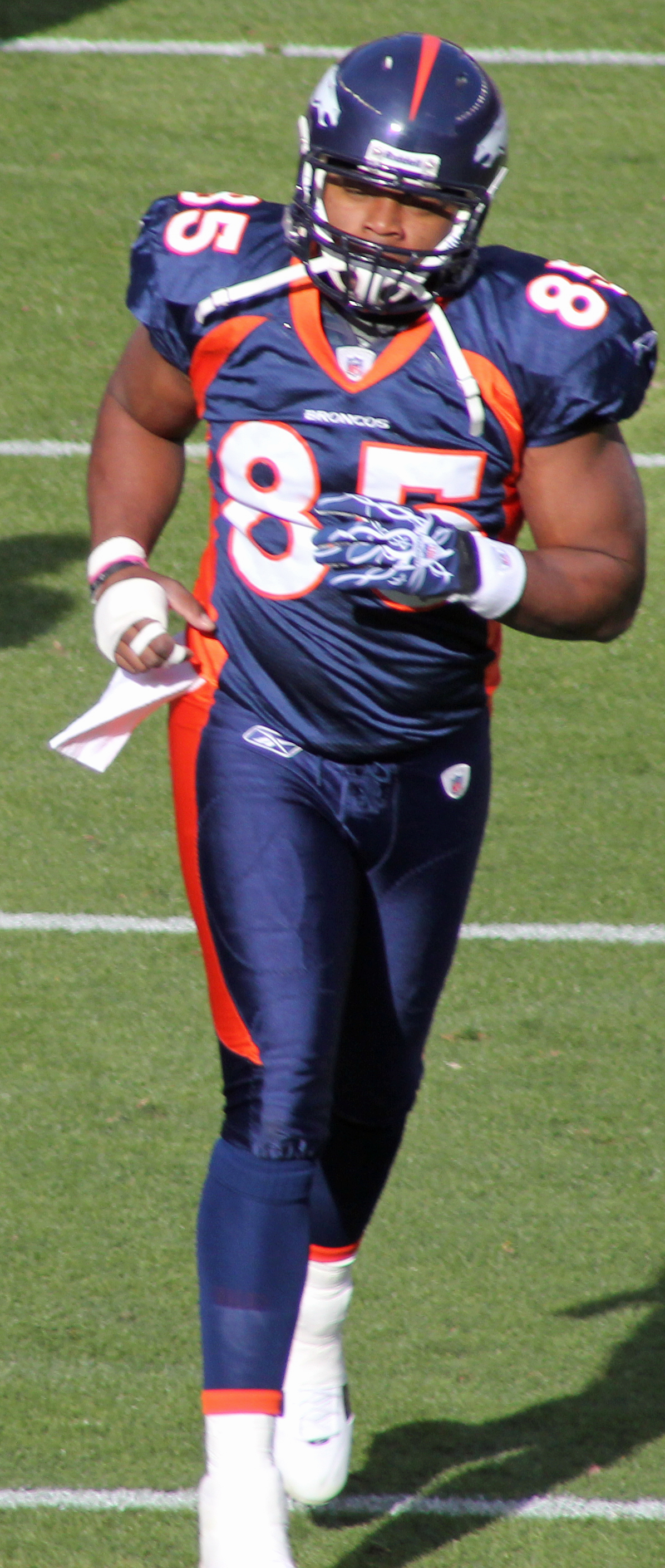
- Coats in 2010

No. 86, 85
- Position: Tight end

Personal information
- Born: April 16, 1984 (age 42); Layton, Utah, U.S.
- Listed height: 6 ft 3 in (1.91 m)
- Listed weight: 257 lb (117 kg)

Career information
- College: BYU
- NFL draft: 2007: undrafted

Career history
- Cincinnati Bengals (2007–2010); Denver Broncos (2010); New York Giants (2011)*
- * Offseason or practice squad member only

Career NFL statistics
- Receptions: 30
- Receiving yards: 291
- Stats at Pro Football Reference

Daniel Coats (born April 16, 1984) is an American former professional football player who was a tight end in the National Football League (NFL). He was signed by the Cincinnati Bengals as an undrafted free agent in 2007. He played college football for the BYU Cougars.

He has also played for the Denver Broncos.

== Professional career ==
=== Cincinnati Bengals ===
Coats was re-signed by the Bengals as an exclusive-rights free agent on February 12, 2009. On October 26, 2010, he was waived by the Bengals after making six appearances in 2010.

=== Denver Broncos ===
On November 9, 2010, Coats was signed by the Denver Broncos. Coats was released by the Broncos just a day later, as the team decided to sign running back Lance Ball to the active roster. Coats was signed by the Broncos on December 6, 2010, filling one of the roster spots made available by the placing of tight end Dan Gronkowski and linebacker Joe Mays on injured reserve. Coats was released on July 31, 2011, by the Broncos.

=== New York Giants ===
Coats signed with the New York Giants on August 7, 2011. Coats was released during the team's final cuts.
