= 2006 Cincinnati Bengals season =

NFL team season

- Owner: Mike Brown
- Head coach: Marvin Lewis
- Offensive coordinator: Bob Bratkowski
- Defensive coordinator: Chuck Bresnahan
- Home stadium: Paul Brown Stadium

Results
- Record: 8–8
- Division place: 2nd AFC North
- Playoffs: Did not qualify
- Pro Bowlers: None

Uniform
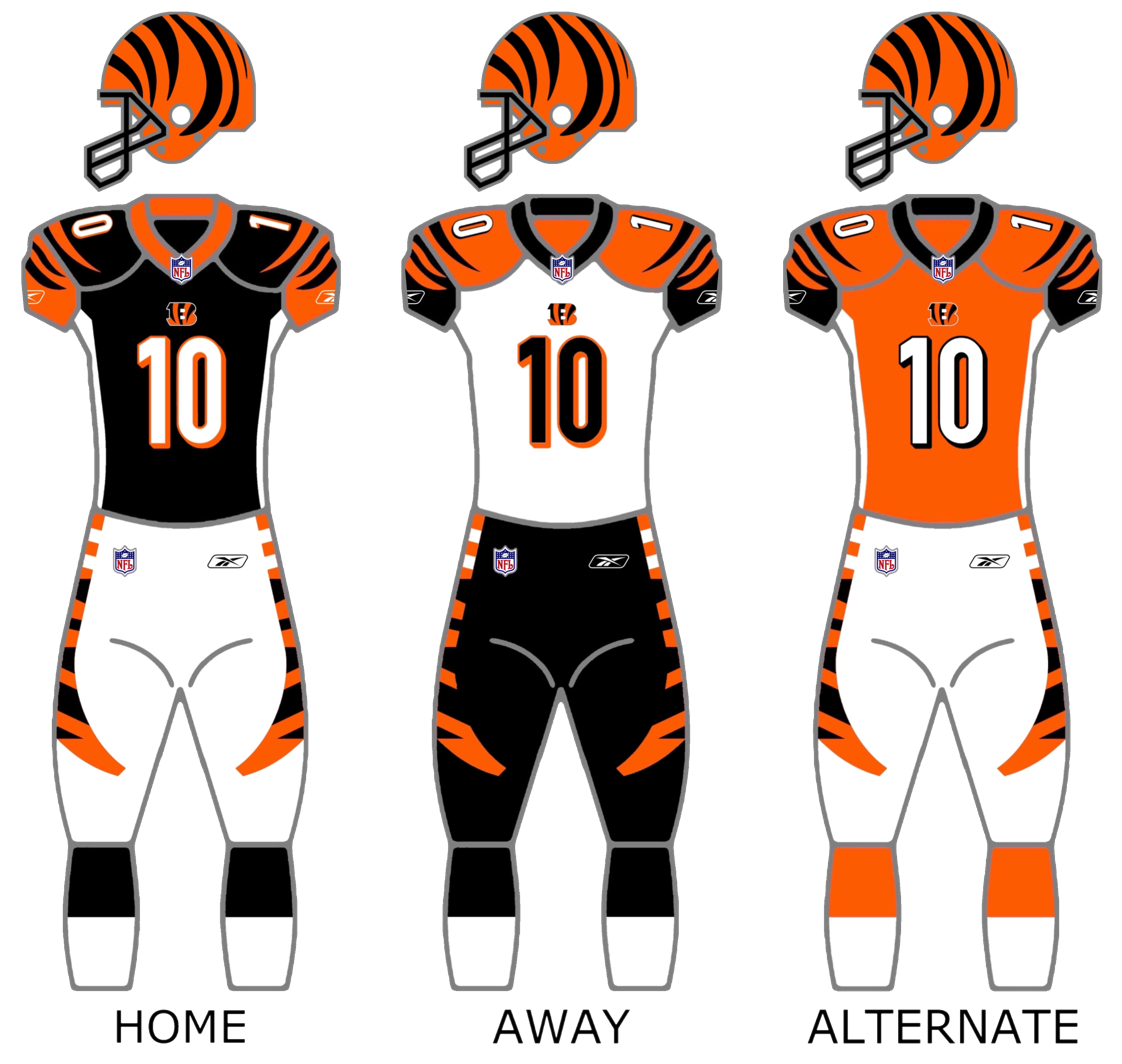

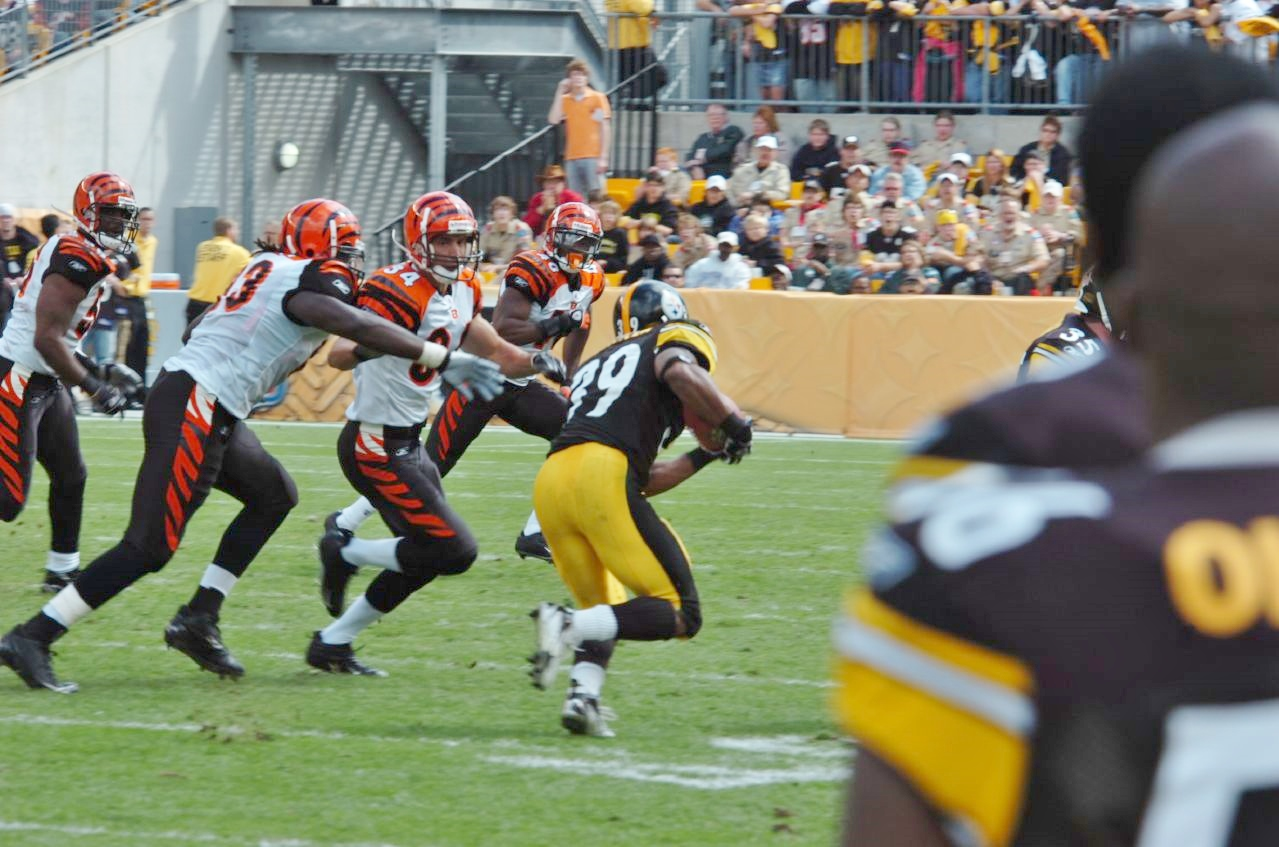
Pittsburgh's Willie Parker is pursued by the Bengals defense in their week 3 encounter

The 2006 Cincinnati Bengals season was the franchise's 37th season in the National Football League (NFL), 39th overall, and 4th under head coach Marvin Lewis. It began with the team trying to improve on their 11–5 record from 2005, defending their AFC North Division Championship title. They also attempted to progress further through the playoffs than they did in the 2005 season, having lost to Pittsburgh in the first round after the loss of star quarterback Carson Palmer to injury in the second play of the game. However, the team failed to improve on their 11–5 record, finishing at 8–8, and missing the playoffs.

== Off season ==
=== NFL draft ===
2006 Cincinnati Bengals draft
Round	Pick	Player	Position	College	Notes
1	24	Johnathan Joseph *	Cornerback	South Carolina	
2	55	Andrew Whitworth *	Offensive tackle	LSU	
3	91	Frostee Rucker	Defensive end	USC	
4	123	Domata Peko	Defensive tackle	Michigan State	
5	157	A. J. Nicholson	Linebacker	Florida State	
6	193	Reggie McNeal	Quarterback	Texas A&M	
7	209	Ethan Kilmer	Wide receiver	Penn State	
7	231	Bennie Brazell	Wide receiver	LSU	
Made roster * Made at least one Pro Bowl during career

=== Personnel moves ===
Offseason personnel moves
Date	Transaction	Position	Name	Status	From
Jan 10	Signed	S	Tony Bua		Practice Squad
Feb 1	Signed	WR	P.K. Sam	Free Agent	From New England
Feb 7	Signed	QB	Doug Johnson	Free Agent	From Tennessee
Feb 13	Signed	LB	Rashad Jeanty	Free Agent	From Edmonton/CFL
Mar 10	Terminated Contract	DE	Duane Clemons		
Mar 13	Signed	S	Dexter Jackson	Unrestricted Free Agent	From Tampa Bay
Mar 21	Signed	WR	Antonio Chatman	Unrestricted Free Agent	From Green Bay
Mar 31	Terminated Contract	S	Kim Herring		
Apr 3	Signed	DT	Sam Adams	Unrestricted Free Agent	From Buffalo
Apr 21	Signed	QB	Anthony Wright	Unrestricted Free Agent	From Baltimore

=== Carson Palmer's rehab ===
Exceeding expectations, Carson Palmer was able to play on his reconstructed ligaments in only 8 months. There was a minor controversy when it appeared that Marvin Lewis wanted Carson Palmer to play in the preseason earlier than Carson said. The controversy was dismissed by Lewis as miscommunication and sensationalism by the media. Carson's fame was boosted by a favorable interview with Sports Illustrated which documented his recovery progress.

=== Legal troubles ===
During the 2006 off season and season, nine different Bengals players were either arrested or suspended. The sports media wrote extensively on the legal woes and character questions of some of the Bengals players. The media also commonly noted that the 2006 Bengals had more arrests than wins.

- Chris Henry: marijuana charges, pulling a gun on a group in Orlando, speeding and drunk driving, providing alcohol to minors, over the course of several months in four different incidents.
- Odell Thurman: suspended for the first four games of the 2006–2007 regular season due to a drug-test related suspension. Odell stated this was due to his skipping a test, not failing one, and chalked it up to being immature. In addition to Thurmans's drug-related suspension, he was arrested for drunk driving early Monday morning after the Bengals' victory over the Pittsburgh Steelers. Thurman was scheduled to be in court on October 2, 2006.
- Frostee Rucker: two counts of spousal abuse, and vandalism (the alleged incident occurred prior to Cincinnati drafting him).
- A.J. Nicholson: charged with burglary; he was previously arrested twice on suspicion of alcohol-related offenses (the alleged incident occurred prior to Cincinnati drafting him).
- Matthias Askew: subdued by a taser after refusing to move his allegedly illegally parked car (Askew was cut from the team during the preseason games. He is currently seeking legal action against the officers responsible for his being tasered in a lawsuit worth $50 million after the charges were proven unfounded).
- Eric Steinbach: charged with boating under the influence.
- Reggie McNeal: charged with resisting arrest and drug possession (December 3, 2006)
- Deltha O'Neal: charged with driving while intoxicated following a traffic stop (December 9, 2006).

=== Lawsuit Dismissed ===
A lawsuit introduced by a county commissioner charging the Bengals' organization with making a deal in bad faith between the organization and county taxpayers was dismissed, largely unconsidered.

== Personnel ==
2006 Cincinnati Bengals staff
Front office: President – Mike Brown; Executive vice president – Katie Blackburn; Senior vice president of player personnel – Pete Brown; Vice president of player personnel – Paul Brown; Director of football operations – Jim Lippincott; Director of player personnel – Duke Tobin; Head coaches: Head coach – Marvin Lewis; Assistant head coach/offensive line – Paul Alexander; Offensive coaches: Offensive coordinator – Bob Bratkowski; Quarterbacks – Ken Zampese; Running backs – Jim Anderson; Wide receivers – Hue Jackson; Tight ends – Jonathan Hayes; Assistant offensive line – Bob Surace	Defensive coaches: Defensive coordinator – Chuck Bresnahan; Defensive line – Jay Hayes; Linebackers – Ricky Hunley; Defensive backs – Kevin Coyle; Assistant defensive backs – Louie Cioffi; Special teams coaches: Special teams – Darrin Simmons; Assistant special teams/linebackers assistant – Paul Guenther; Strength and conditioning: Strength and conditioning – Chip Morton; Assistant strength and conditioning – Ray Oliver

== Roster ==
2006 Cincinnati Bengals roster
Quarterbacks (QB): 12 Doug Johnson; 10 Reggie McNeal; 9 Carson Palmer; 2 Anthony Wright; Running backs (RB): 31 Jeremi Johnson FB; 32 Rudi Johnson; 33 Kenny Watson; 35 Quincy Wilson; Wide receivers (WR): 18 Skyler Green; 15 Chris Henry; 16 Glenn Holt KR; 84 T. J. Houshmandzadeh; 85 Chad Johnson; Tight ends (TE): 82 Reggie Kelly; 86 Tony Stewart	Offensive linemen (OL): 71 Willie Anderson T; 79 Stacy Andrews G/T; 53 Eric Ghiaciuc C; 76 Levi Jones T; 75 Scott Kooistra G/T; 65 Eric Steinbach; 77 Andrew Whitworth G/T; 64 Ben Wilkerson C; 63 Bobbie Williams G; Defensive linemen (DL): 95 Sam Adams DT; 68 Jonathan Fanene DE; 91 Robert Geathers DE; 94 Domata Peko DT; 98 Bryan Robinson DE; 90 Justin Smith DE; 66 Shaun Smith DT; 97 John Thornton DT	Linebackers (LB): 50 Ahmad Brooks MLB; 57 Andre Frazier OLB; 93 Rashad Jeanty OLB; 59 Landon Johnson OLB; 58 Caleb Miller; 52 A. J. Nicholson MLB; 56 Brian Simmons; 55 Marcus Wilkins OLB; Defensive backs (DB): 36 John Busing FS; 28 Dexter Jackson SS; 20 Tory James CB; 44 Herana-Daze Jones SS; 22 Johnathan Joseph CB; 34 Kevin Kaesviharn SS; 43 Ethan Kilmer FS; 24 Deltha O'Neal CB; 25 Keiwan Ratliff; 40 Madieu Williams FS; Special teams (ST): 17 Shayne Graham K; 19 Kyle Larson P; 48 Brad St. Louis LS	Practice squad: 49 Tim Day TE; 80 Ronnie Ghent TE (IR); 67 Ryan Hayslip G/T; 78 Eric Henderson DE; 62 Nate Livings G; 38 Chris Manderino FB; 73 Alan Reuber T; 29 Brandon Williams CB; Reserve: 21 Rashad Bauman CB (IR); 74 Rich Braham C (IR); 81 Bennie Brazell WR (IR); 27 Greg Brooks CB (IR); 83 Antonio Chatman WR (IR); 70 Adam Kieft T (PUP); 42 Anthony Mitchell S (IR); 23 Chris Perry RB (IR); 88 Tab Perry (IR); 99 David Pollack LB (IR); 92 Frostee Rucker DE (IR); 51 Odell Thurman LB (Susp.); 87 Kelley Washington WR (IR); 30 Terrence Whitehead RB (IR); Rookies in italics 53 active, 15 reserve, 7 practice squad

== Regular season ==
=== Schedule ===
Week	Date	Opponent	Result	Record	Venue	Recap
1	September 10	at Kansas City Chiefs	**W** 23–10	1–0	Arrowhead Stadium	Recap
2	September 14	**Cleveland Browns**	**W** 34–17	2–0	Paul Brown Stadium	Recap
3	September 24	at **Pittsburgh Steelers**	**W** 28–20	3–0	Heinz Field	Recap
4	October 1	New England Patriots	**L** 13–38	3–1	Paul Brown Stadium	Recap
5	Bye					
6	October 15	at Tampa Bay Buccaneers	**L** 13–14	3–2	Raymond James Stadium	Recap
7	October 22	Carolina Panthers	**W** 17–14	4–2	Paul Brown Stadium	Recap
8	October 29	Atlanta Falcons	**L** 27–29	4–3	Paul Brown Stadium	Recap
9	November 5	at **Baltimore Ravens**	**L** 20–26	4–4	M&T Bank Stadium	Recap
10	November 12	San Diego Chargers	**L** 41–49	4–5	Paul Brown Stadium	Recap
11	November 19	at New Orleans Saints	**W** 31–16	5–5	Louisiana Superdome	Recap
12	November 26	at **Cleveland Browns**	**W** 30–0	6–5	Cleveland Browns Stadium	Recap
13	November 30	**Baltimore Ravens**	**W** 13–7	7–5	Paul Brown Stadium	Recap
14	December 10	Oakland Raiders	**W** 27–10	8–5	Paul Brown Stadium	Recap
15	December 18	at Indianapolis Colts	**L** 16–34	8–6	RCA Dome	Recap
16	December 24	at Denver Broncos	**L** 23–24	8–7	Invesco Field at Mile High	Recap
17	December 31	**Pittsburgh Steelers**	**L** 17–23 (OT)	8–8	Paul Brown Stadium	Recap

Note: Intra-divisional opponents are in bold text

=== Week 1: at Kansas City Chiefs ===
	1	2	3	4	Total
**Bengals**	0	17	0	6	**23**
Chiefs	3	0	0	7	**10**

at Arrowhead Stadium, Kansas City, Missouri

The Bengals opened the regular season on the road against the Kansas City Chiefs on September 10. The Chiefs scored first with a 29-yard field goal by kicker Lawrence Tynes. In the second quarter, the Bengals scored 17 straight points. Bengal kicker Shayne Graham tied the game up with a 37-yard field goal, Rudi Johnson ran 22 yards for a touchdown, and Kenny Watson ran 8 yards for another touchdown, making the score 17–3 at halftime. After both sides failed to score in the third quarter, which was marked by Chief quarterback Trent Green being injured and leaving the game, Graham made the score 20–3 with a 42-yard field goal. A Chiefs' comeback fell short, as they could only score on a 9-yard touchdown pass from Chief back-up quarterback Damon Huard to tight end Tony Gonzalez. A 36-yard field goal by Graham would be the final score of the game, leaving the Bengals 1–0.

=== Week 2: vs. Cleveland Browns ===
	1	2	3	4	Total
Browns	3	0	0	14	**17**
**Bengals**	14	3	0	17	**34**

at Paul Brown Stadium, Cincinnati, Ohio

The Bengals began Round 1 of 2006's Battle of Ohio in the Week 2 home-opener against the Cleveland Browns. Cincinnati scored first on a 22-yard TD pass to wide receiver Kelley Washington from Carson Palmer. The Browns responded with a 30-yard FG by kicker Phil Dawson. The Bengals extended their lead with an 8-yard TD pass to wide receiver Chad Johnson. In the second quarter, kicker Shayne Graham made a 37-yard field goal as time ran out to give Cincinnati a 17–3 halftime lead. In the fourth quarter, Graham would give the Bengals a 37-yard field goal, and the Browns responded with a 1-yard touchdown run by running back Reuben Droughns. Two touchdown runs by Bengal running back Rudi Johnson put the game out of reach. The Browns scored one more touchdown with quarterback Charlie Frye's 2-yard run, but it was not enough as the Bengals improved to 2–0.

Several Bengals were injured during this game. David Pollack, a 2nd year linebacker, suffered a non-paralyzing broken neck (fracturing his C6 vertebra), and would miss the rest of the season. Safety Dexter Jackson suffered a severe ankle sprain. Center Rich Braham also suffered a leg injury, and was expected to be out for some weeks. Wide receiver, Chad Johnson appeared dinged up too. On his 8-yard touchdown reception, he appeared to have an injured shoulder (made noticeable by his unenthusiastic post-score celebratory dance). Even though he continued to play, he appeared to be in pain. Later in the game, during a Browns interception, he was blocked by a Brown's safety, which gave him a concussion. Special team starter, Tab Perry, injured his hip, and missed a number of games.

=== Week 3: at Pittsburgh Steelers ===
	1	2	3	4	Total
**Bengals**	0	14	0	14	**28**
Steelers	7	0	10	3	**20**

at Heinz Field, Pittsburgh, Pennsylvania

The Bengals maintained a shared lead in the AFC North (3–0, 2–0) by defeating the Pittsburgh Steelers 28–20 at Heinz Field in Pittsburgh, Pennsylvania. The game was marred by sloppy play by both teams, but Cincinnati benefitted greatly by creating 5 Steeler turnovers and blocking a Jeff Reed field goal attempt.

Running back Willie Parker scored for Pittsburgh, with a touchdown on their first drive of the game. Following a Deshea Townsend interception of Carson Palmer, the Steelers drove into the redzone, but a Ben Roethlisberger pass was intercepted by safety Madieu Williams in the end zone, and returned to the three-yard line. A 97-yard Bengal drive was capped by a 16-yard touchdown pass from Palmer to Chris Henry. Following a blocked field goal by John Thornton, Palmer and Henry would connect for another touchdown late in the second quarter, which gave Cincinnati a 14–7 lead at halftime.

In the third quarter, Pittsburgh built momentum, scoring a field goal on their first drive. An Ike Taylor interception of Palmer, set up the Steelers on the Bengals' 7-yard line. Willie Parker scored 4 plays later, giving the Steelers a 17–14 lead. After the touchdown, both offenses stalled. The next seven drives ended in either punts or turnovers.

With 8 minutes left in the game, the Bengals were forced to punt. A muffed return by Ricardo Colclough, and recovery by Tony Stewart, gave the Bengals the ball on the Steelers' 9-yard line. Palmer threw a touchdown to T. J. Houshmandzadeh on the first play from scrimmage, giving the Bengals a 21–17 lead. The Bengal defense forced a fumble on the next Steeler drive, giving the Bengals the ball on the Steeler 30-yard line. On the first play of the drive, Palmer again connected with Houshmandzadeh for a touchdown, extending the Bengal lead to 28–17. On the next possession, the Steeler offense drove to the Bengals' 18 and added another Jeff Reed field goal. After forcing a Bengal punt, the Steelers took possession on their own 11-yard line, with 2:42 left in the game. Roethlisberger drove the Steelers down to the Bengals' 16-yard line, but his pass intended for Nate Washington in the end zone, was intercepted by Kevin Kaesviharn.

The Bengal win improved their record to 3–0. However, the Bengals allowed 6 sacks, gave up 3 turnovers and were unable to involve either of the "Johnsons" as a significant part of their offense. The Bengals looked to improve in week 4 at home against the Patriots.

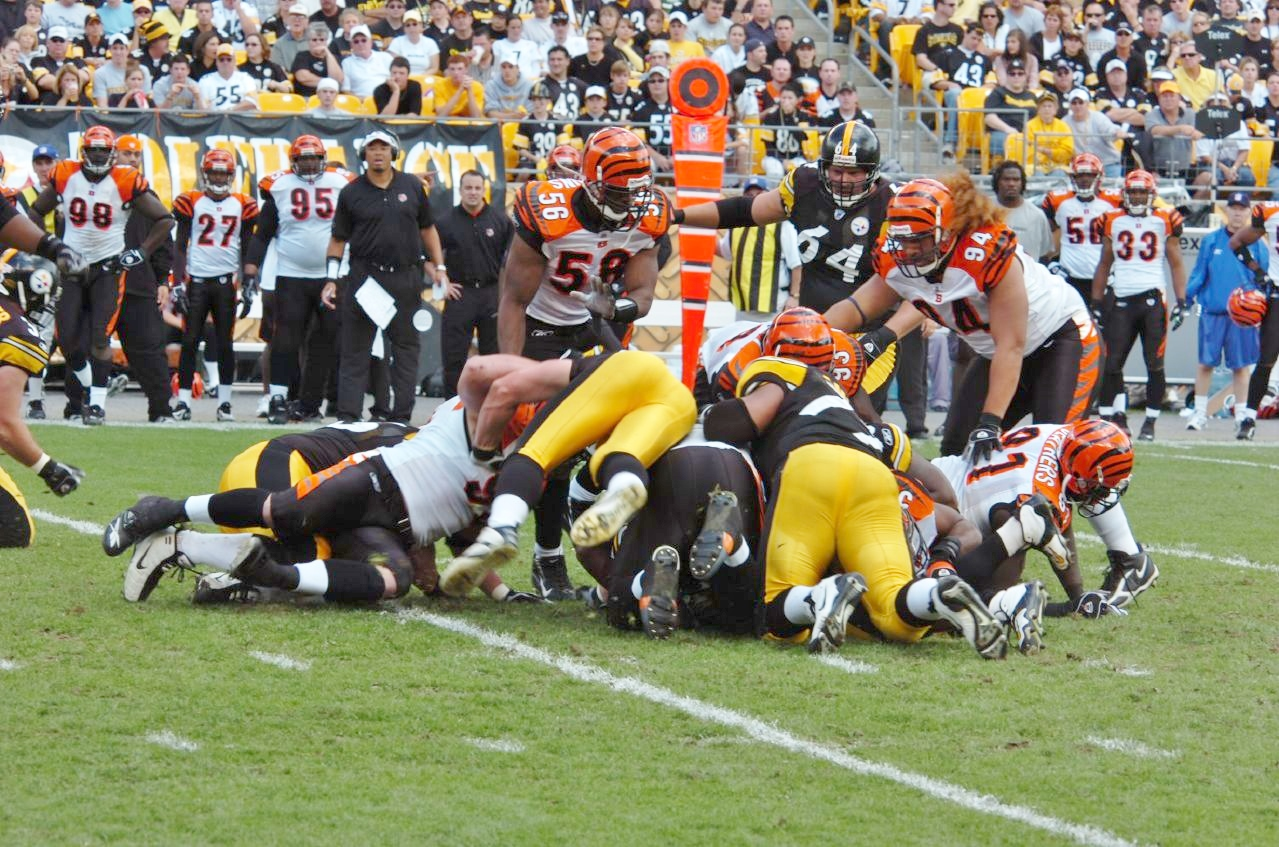
Pittsburgh on offense against the Bengals

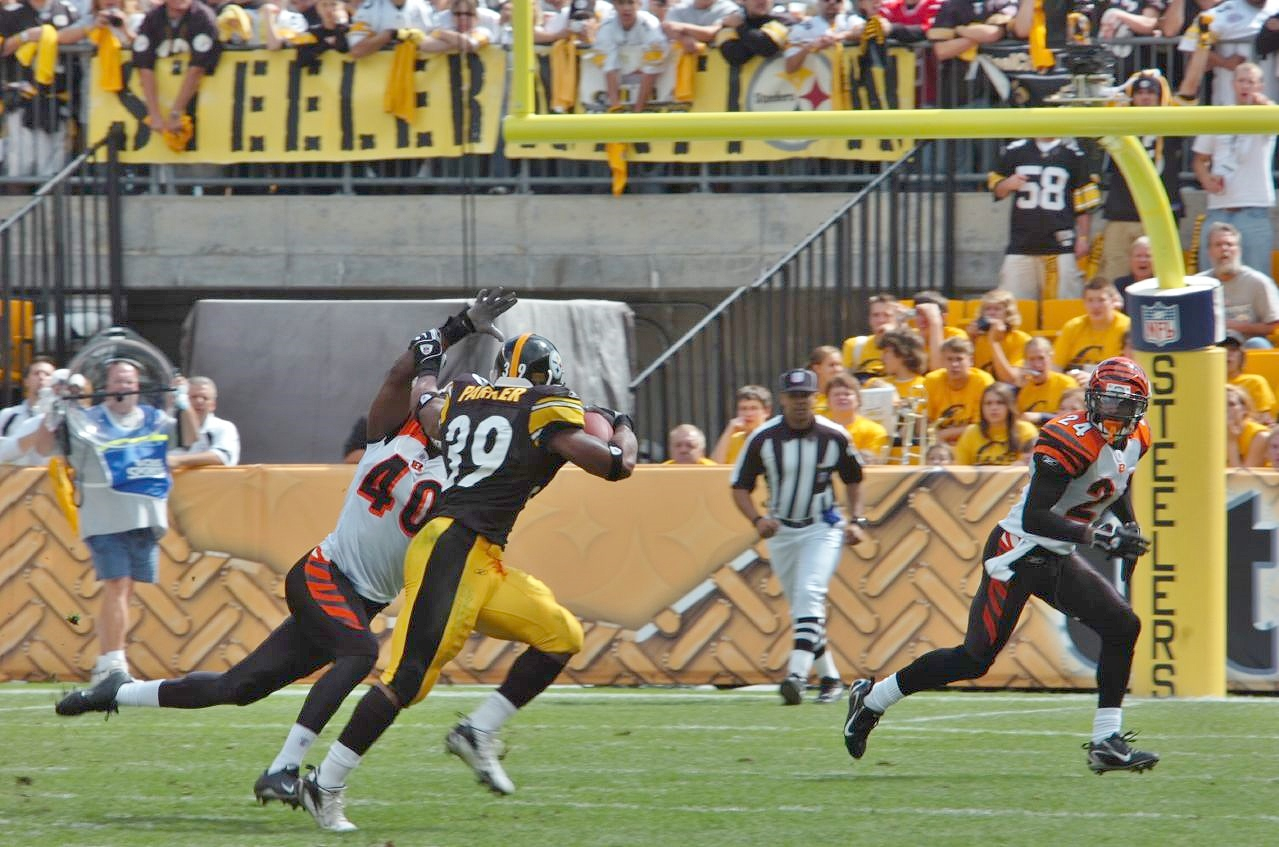
Willie Parker and Deltha O'Neal

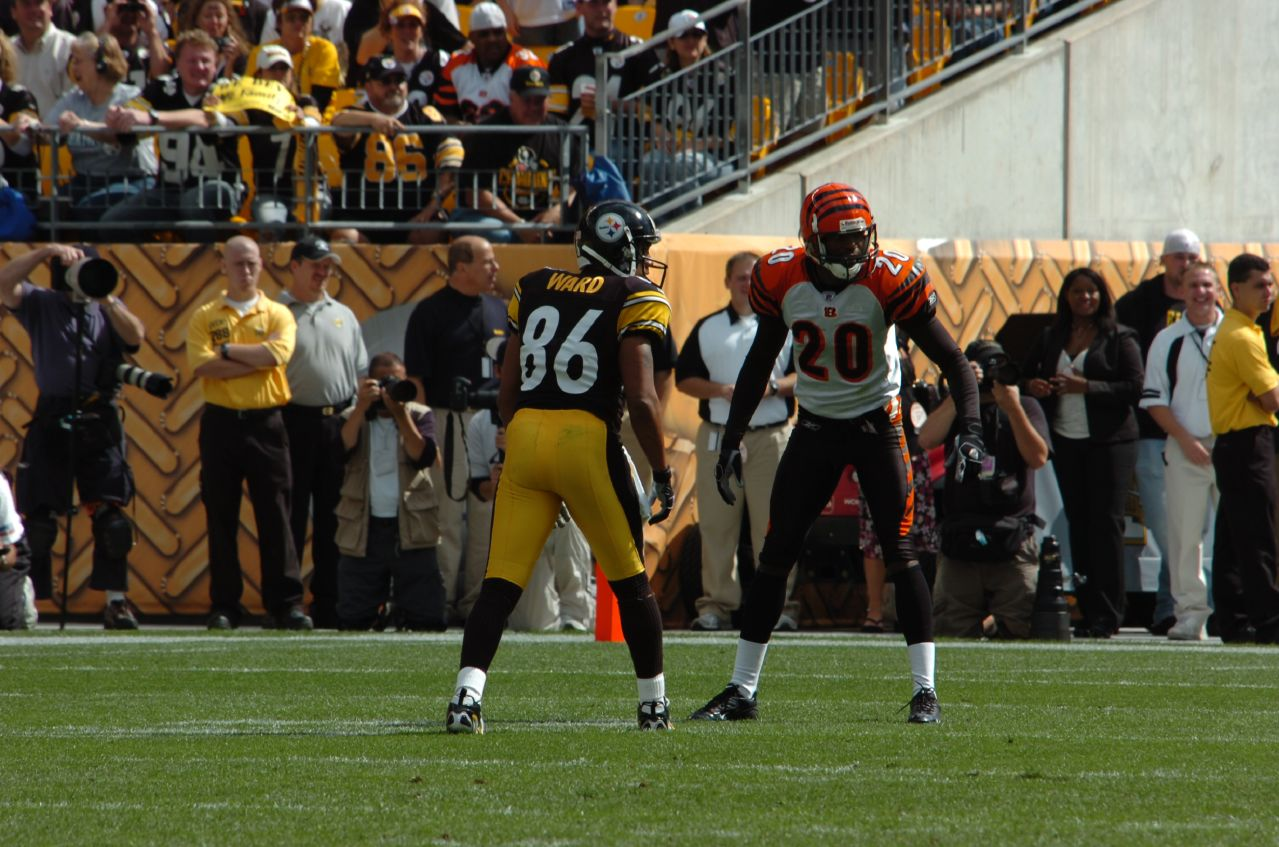
Hines Ward and Tory James

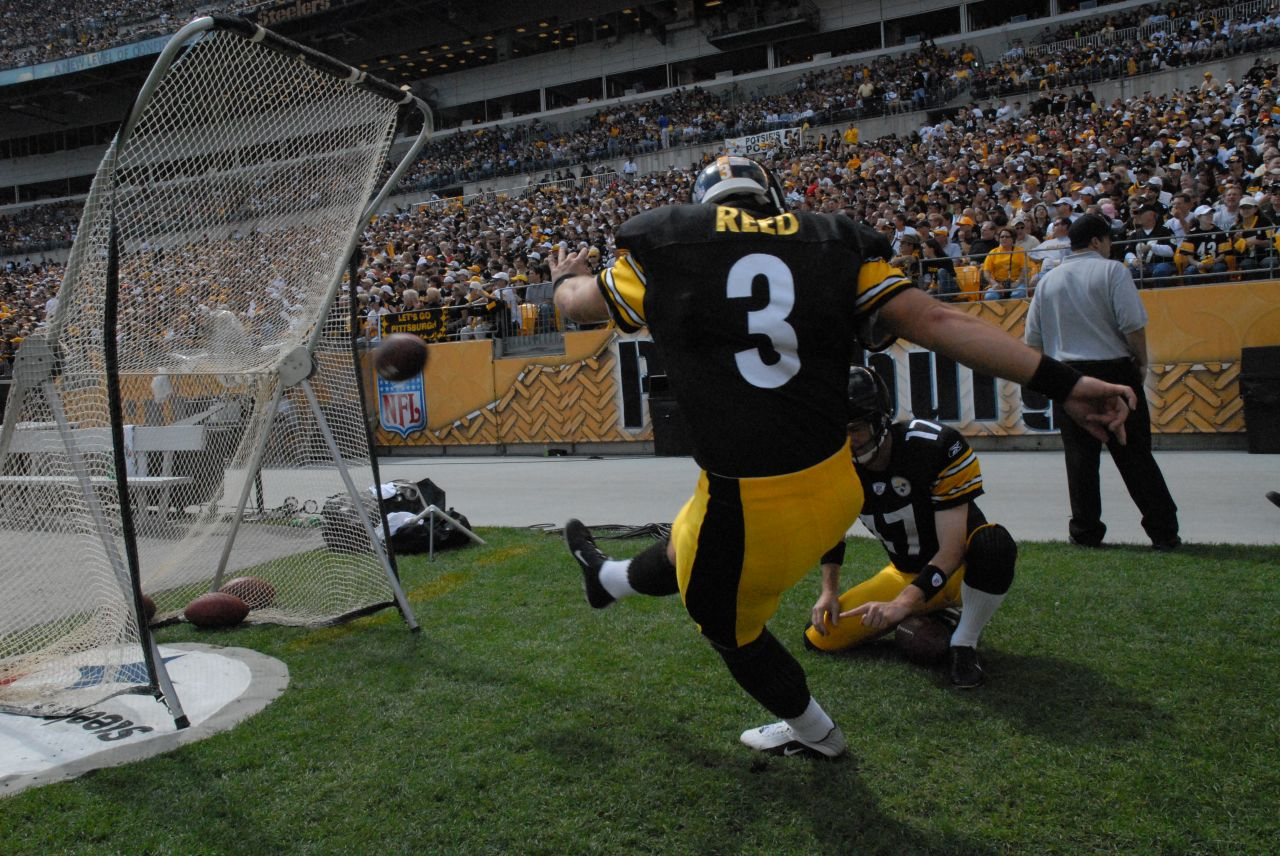
Kicker Jeff Reed warms up against Cincinnati

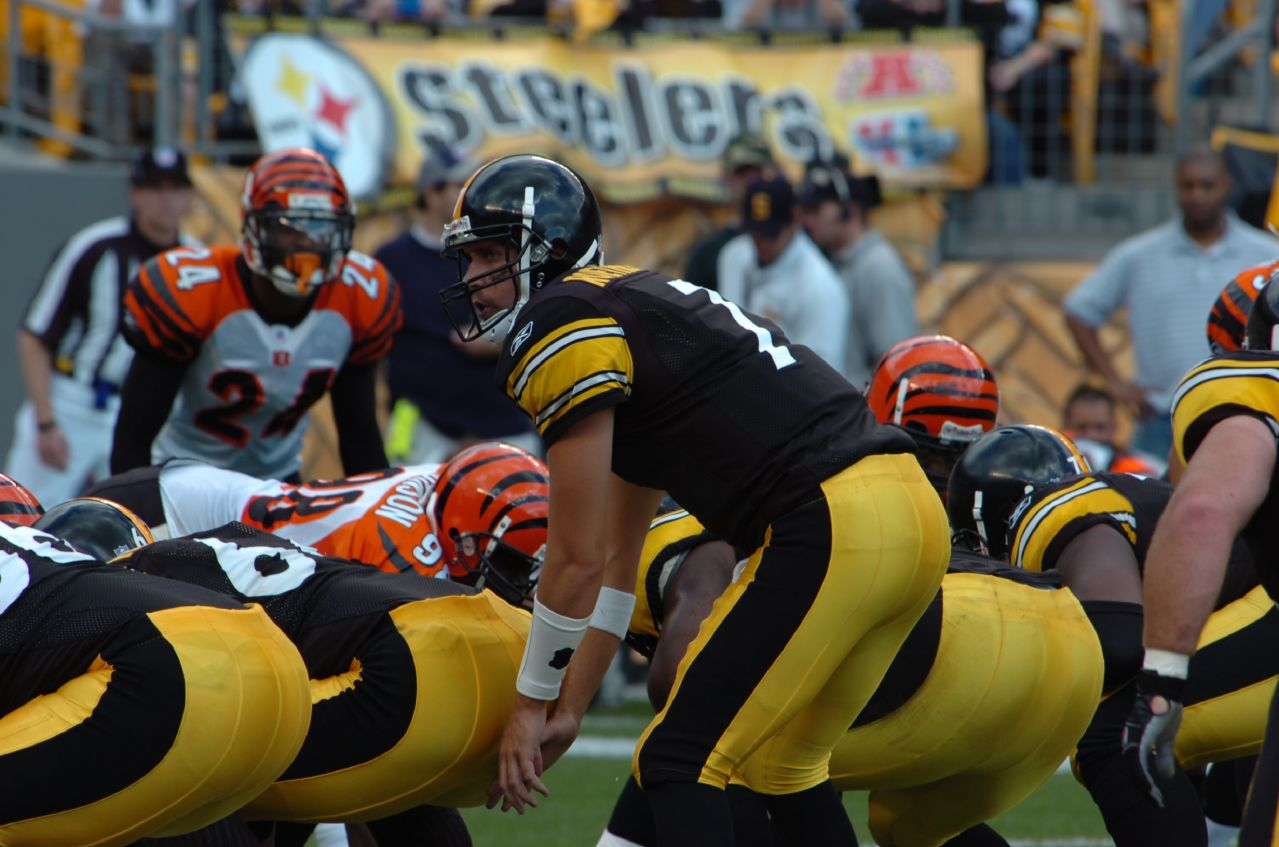
Cincinnati prepares to face a Ben Roethlisberger snap

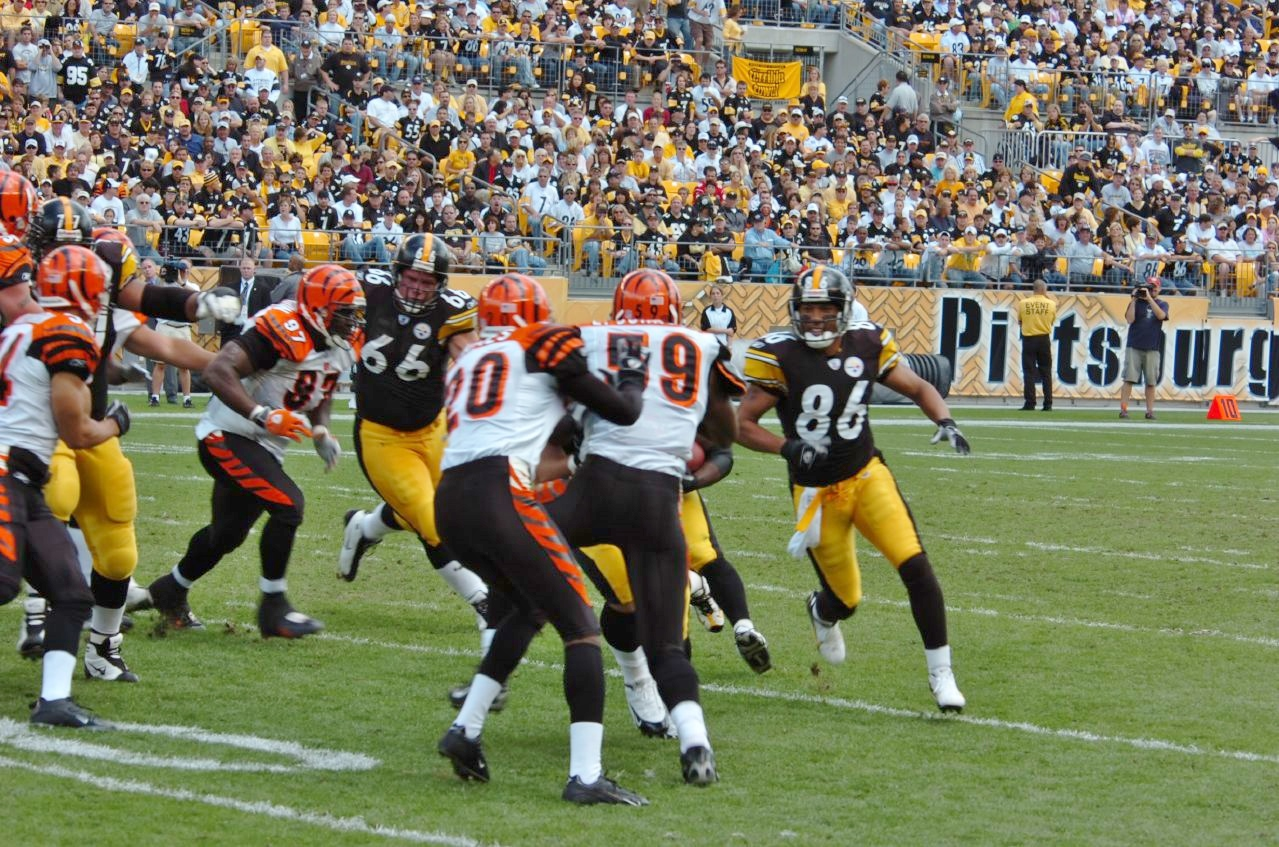
Pittsburgh with possession against Cincinnati

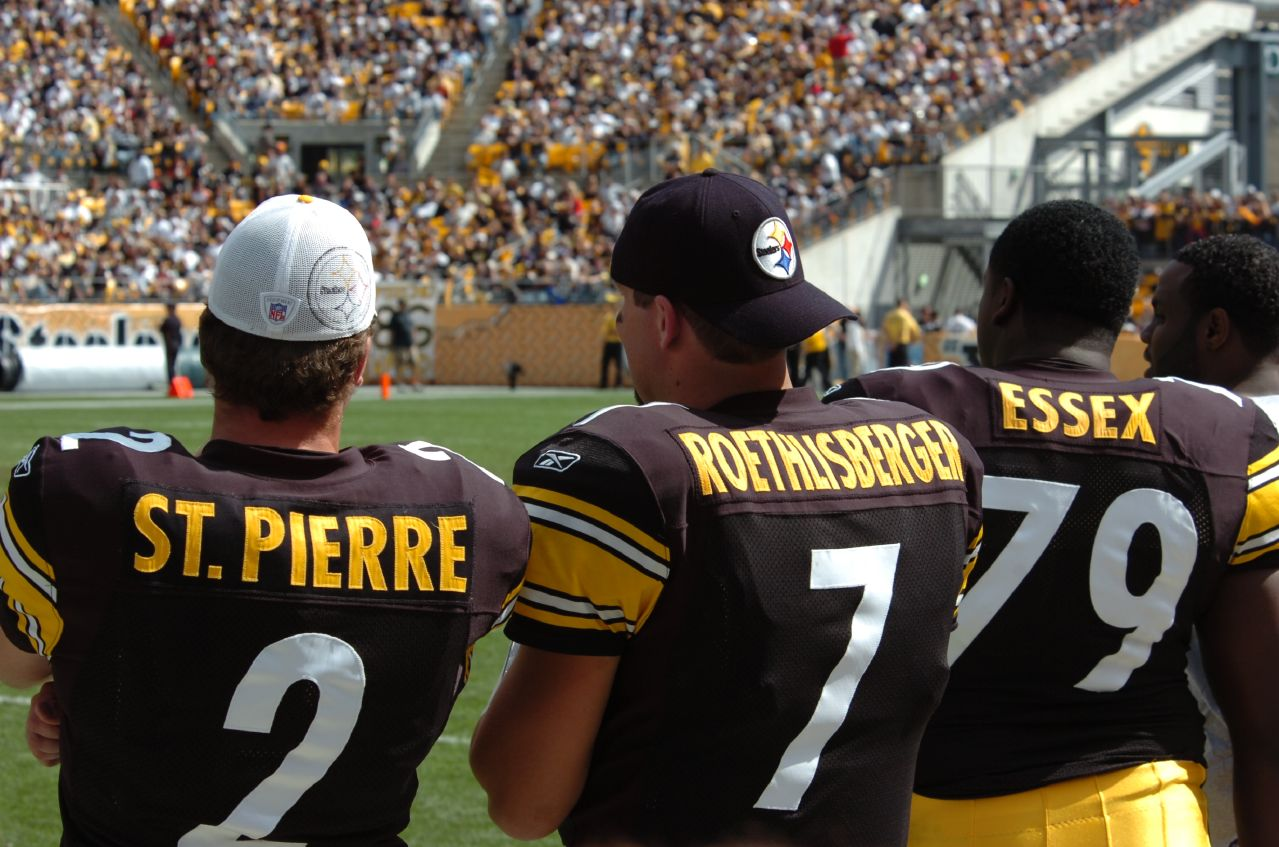
Ben Roethlisberger, Brian St. Pierre, and Trai Essex

==== After The Game ====
Odell Thurman was arrested for a DUI with teammates Chris Henry and Reggie McNeal in the vehicle. Odell had just entered the 3rd game of a 4-game suspension for violating the NFL's drug policy, and the NFL suspended him for the remainder of the season.

=== Week 4: vs. New England Patriots ===
	1	2	3	4	Total
**Patriots**	0	14	7	17	**38**
Bengals	6	0	7	0	**13**

at Paul Brown Stadium, Cincinnati, Ohio

The Bengals quarterback protection was an issue, as Carson Palmer was sacked four times during this game. Last year, Palmer was better protected, having been sacked 21 times for the entire year. Entering this game, he has been sacked 16 times. For the offense and defense the running game proved problematic. Rudi Johnson failed to gain 50 yards on the ground while the Patriots' running backs, former Bengal Corey Dillon and rookie RB Laurence Maroney, combined for 192 rushing yards. Caleb Miller started in the right linebacker position and led the Bengals in tackles during the game.

The passing offense for the Bengals was largely unsuccessful. Although wide receiver T. J. Houshmandzadeh gained 95 yards, his starting counterpart, Chad Johnson, could not gain more than 65. Wideout Chris Henry was deactivated for the game for what was believed to be a disciplinary measure by Head Coach Marvin Lewis for his involvement in Odell Thurman's DUI incident.

This was the first game that Corey Dillon played at Paul Brown Stadium as a non-Bengal, during a regular season game. His controversial behavior in his latter years with the Bengals made him a target for many fans' anger. According to post-game reports, Dillon waved running back Maroney off the field when the Patriots were close to scoring a touchdown, so Dillon could run it in himself. Afterward, he threw the football into the stands and his celebration drew a flag for a personal foul from the referees.

The Bengals fell to second place in the AFC North (3–1) after the disappointing loss to the Patriots. Going into a bye-week, the extra time off gives injured Bengals time to recuperate.

=== Week 5: Bye ===
The NFL determined Chris Henry would be suspended for the next 2 NFL games due to his involvement with the DUI incident involving Odell Thurman.

=== Week 6: at Tampa Bay Buccaneers ===
	1	2	3	4	Total
Bengals	0	7	3	3	**13**
**Buccaneers**	0	0	7	7	**14**

at Raymond James Stadium, Tampa, Florida

Coming off their bye-week, the Bengals traveled to Raymond James Stadium for a Week 6 fight with the Buccaneers. After a scoreless first quarter, Cincinnati took an early lead, as quarterback Carson Palmer threw a 33-yard TD pass to wide receiver T. J. Houshmandzadeh for the only score of the half.

In the third quarter, the Bucs would tie the game, as quarterback Bruce Gradkowski completed a 2-yard TD pass to tight end Alex Smith. The Bengals would regain the lead when kicker Shayne Graham kicked a 37-yard field goal. In the fourth quarter, Graham would help Cincinnati increase their lead with a 47-yard field goal. During the Buccaneers' final drive, on 1st down, after entering the red zone, defensive end Justin Smith apparently made the first sack of Gradkowski for the game, during a solo tackle. However, the officiating crew felt Smith drove Gradkowski's head into the ground, and penalized the Bengals for roughing the passer. During the play, Smith caused a fumble which was recovered by the Bengals. When the recovery was overturned due to the controversial call, Tampa Bay kept possession of the ball. On fourth down, the Bucs scored an 8-yard TD pass from Gradkowski to wide receiver Michael Clayton. Originally, the catch was ruled incomplete, but replays proved that Clayton managed to break the plane of the goal line before losing the ball.

With less than :30 left in the game, the Bengals drove from their 30-yard line to Buccaneer territory. With :06 left, they attempted a 62-yard field goal against the wind, but missed. With the loss, Cincinnati fell to 3–2.

==== Post Game ====
Penalty Controversy
In a post-game interview when Marvin Lewis was asked how Justin Smith might have avoided drawing the controversial roughing the passer penalty during the attempted sack, he responded "I don't know. I guess you have to cuddle him to the ground."

Justin Smith said "I've never seen anything like that in my six years in the NFL." The official who made the call "must have season tickets down here." He further explained "The dude (QB) ducked", suggesting it wasn't the force of Smith tackling but the QB's effort to double-over and protect the ball that made it appear he was being forced into the ground head first.

Houshmandzadeh said "You might as well put a red jersey on (Gradkowski) and play two-hand touch."

=== Week 7: vs. Carolina Panthers ===
	1	2	3	4	Total
Panthers	7	7	0	0	**14**
**Bengals**	0	7	3	7	**17**

at Paul Brown Stadium, Cincinnati, Ohio

Hoping to rebound from last week's loss to the Buccaneers, the Bengals prepared for a showdown with the Panthers. This game saw the return of 3rd down running back Chris Perry and safety Dexter Jackson. In the first quarter, Bengal defense allowed a 7-yard TD pass from quarterback Jake Delhomme to tight end Kris Mangum for the quarter's only score. In the second quarter, the Bengals when quarterback Carson Palmer completed a 16-yard TD pass to tight end Reggie Kelly. Delhomme countered with a 20-yard TD pass to running back Nick Goings.

After halftime, Cincinnati's offense found its stride. Kicker Shayne Graham nailed a 23-yard field goal in the third quarter, and Carson Palmer completed a 1-yard touchdown pass to wide receiver T. J. Houshmandzadeh. The drive was kept alive by a 4th and 1 play action pass, where Palmer tossed a high arcing pass down the sideline to a sprinting Chad Johnson, who caught it for a 32-yard gain. The Panthers' last scoring opportunity ended when Delhomme threw his first career interception to Kevin Kaesviharn. The Bengals improved to 4–2, and tied the Ravens for the lead in the AFC North.

==== Post Game ====
After being relatively silent for most of the season, Chad Johnson spoke out boastfully before the Atlanta game predicting he would score multiple touchdowns and jeopardize the job security of rival defensive back, DeAngelo Hall, who entered the game with four interceptions. Chad stated he was using this opportunity for the offense to regain some of its confidence and swagger.

=== Week 8 vs. Atlanta Falcons ===
	1	2	3	4	Total
**Falcons**	6	7	13	3	**29**
Bengals	7	10	3	7	**27**

at Paul Brown Stadium, Cincinnati, Ohio

Following their victory against the Panthers, the Bengals played another home game, this week, against the visiting Falcons. In the first quarter, the Falcons drew first blood, as kicker Morten Andersen nailed a 42-yard field goal. The Bengals responded with a 1-yard TD run by running back Rudi Johnson. Atlanta cut the lead to one point, when Andersen kicked a 40-yard field goal. In the second quarter, Cincinnati added to their lead with quarterback Carson Palmer's 12-yard TD pass to wide receiver Chad Johnson. The Falcons responded with quarterback Michael Vick's 16-yard touchdown pass to tight end Alge Crumpler. Bengal kicker Shayne Graham converted a 51-yard field goal with :20 left before halftime.

In the third quarter, Vick completed a 26-yard touchdown pass to wide receiver Michael Jenkins. Graham would kick a 26-yard field goal for Cincinnati's only score of the quarter. Vick scored another touchdown, on an 8-yard pass to fullback Justin Griffith. The extra point ended with a bobbled snap, and a failed two-point conversion. In the fourth quarter, Andersen converted a 39-yard field goal. Palmer responded with a 55-yard touchdown to WR Chris Henry. Cincinnati's comeback hopes ended with :13 left, when Carson Palmer was sacked, and fumbled, which was recovered by Atlanta. The Bengals record fell to 4–3.

==== Post Game ====
It was this week that the former "Chad Johnson" revealed his name change to "Chad Ocho Cinco" on his warmups, which was rumored to lead to his being fined $5,000.

=== Week 9: at Baltimore Ravens ===
	1	2	3	4	Total
Bengals	0	7	3	10	**20**
**Ravens**	14	3	6	3	**26**

at M&T Bank Stadium, Baltimore, Maryland

The Bengals flew to Baltimore to M&T Bank Stadium for an AFC North fight with the Ravens. The Bengals trailed for the entire game. Running back Jamal Lewis scored on a 2-yard touchdown run. Baltimore's second score came when quarterback Carson Palmer was intercepted by Raven cornerback Samari Rolle at midfield. Rolle would lateral to free safety Ed Reed, who completed the return for a touchdown. In the second quarter, kicker Matt Stover converted a 43-yard field goal for the Ravens. The Bengals would finally score with 1:12 left in the half, with a 26-yard touchdown from Palmer to wide receiver T. J. Houshmandzadeh.

In the third quarter, Stover kicked 25-yard and 36-yard field goals, while Cincinnati kicker Shayne Graham converted a 51-yard field goal attempt. In the fourth quarter, the Bengals' running back Rudi Johnson scored on a 4-yard touchdown run. Stover added another field goal, from 35 yards. Graham added a 31-yard field goal, but the Ravens emerged as the victor, and the Bengals' record fell to 4–4.

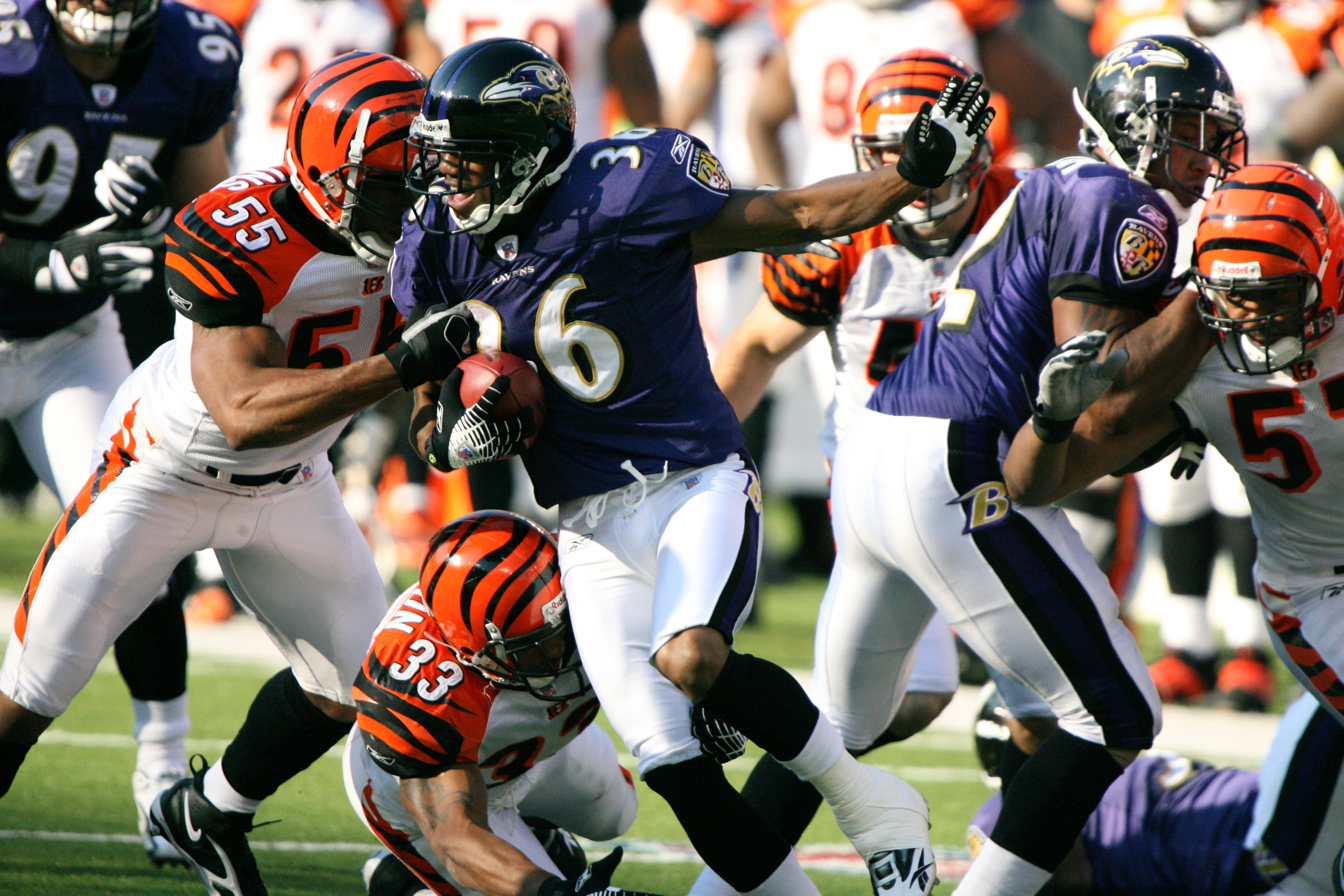
The Bengals on defense against Baltimore

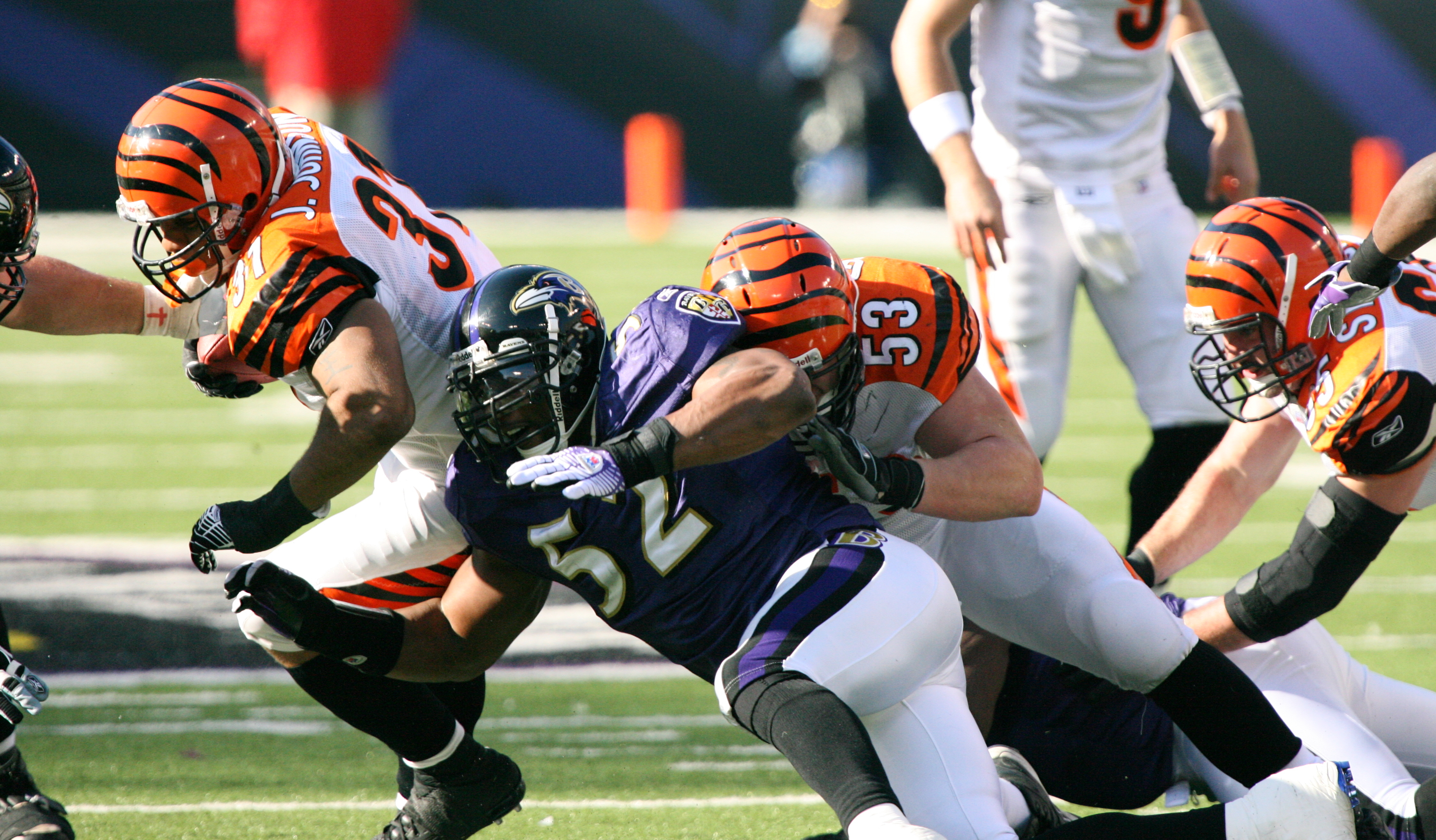
Jeremi Johnson runs the ball, Ray Lewis misses tackling him

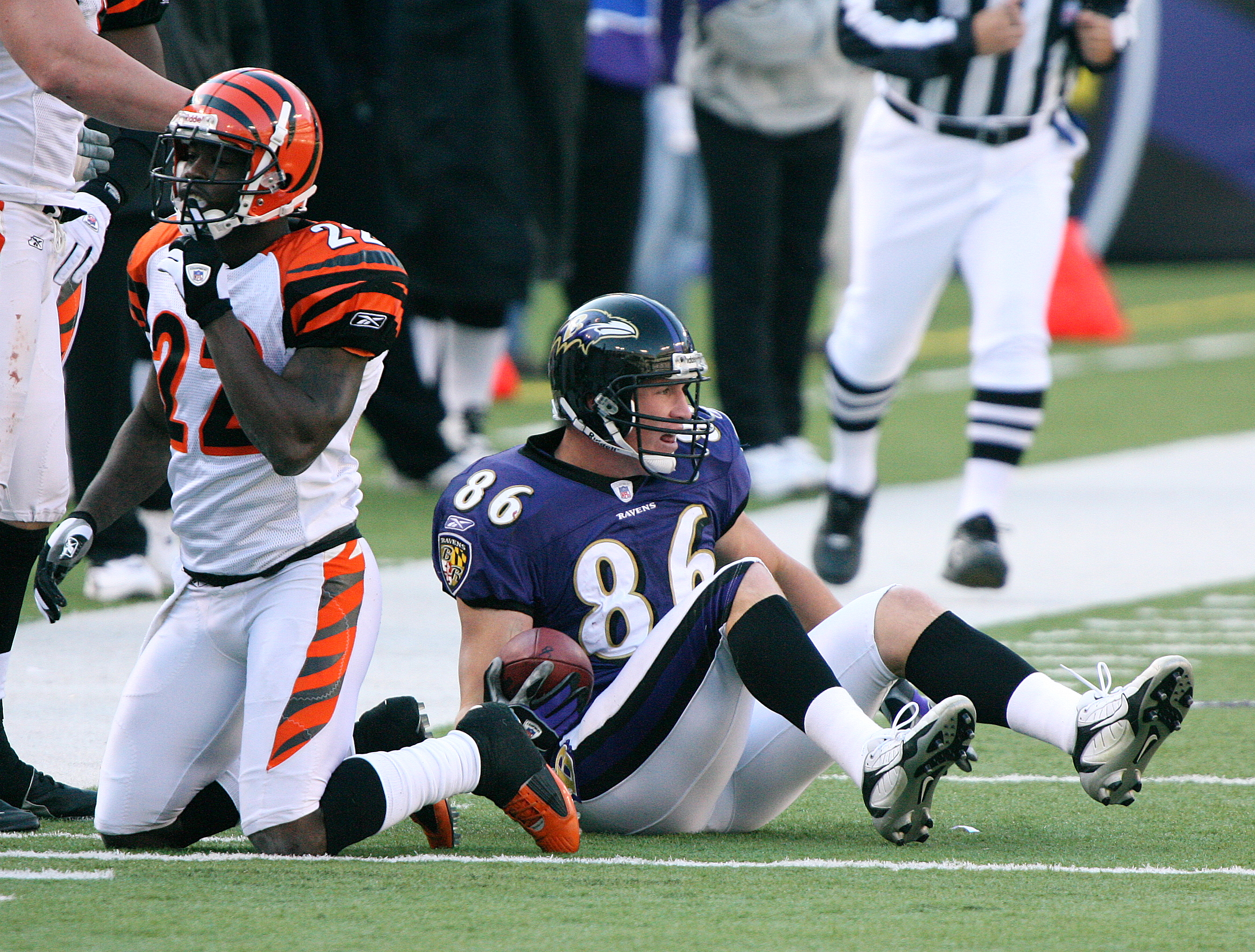
Johnathan Joseph and Todd Heap

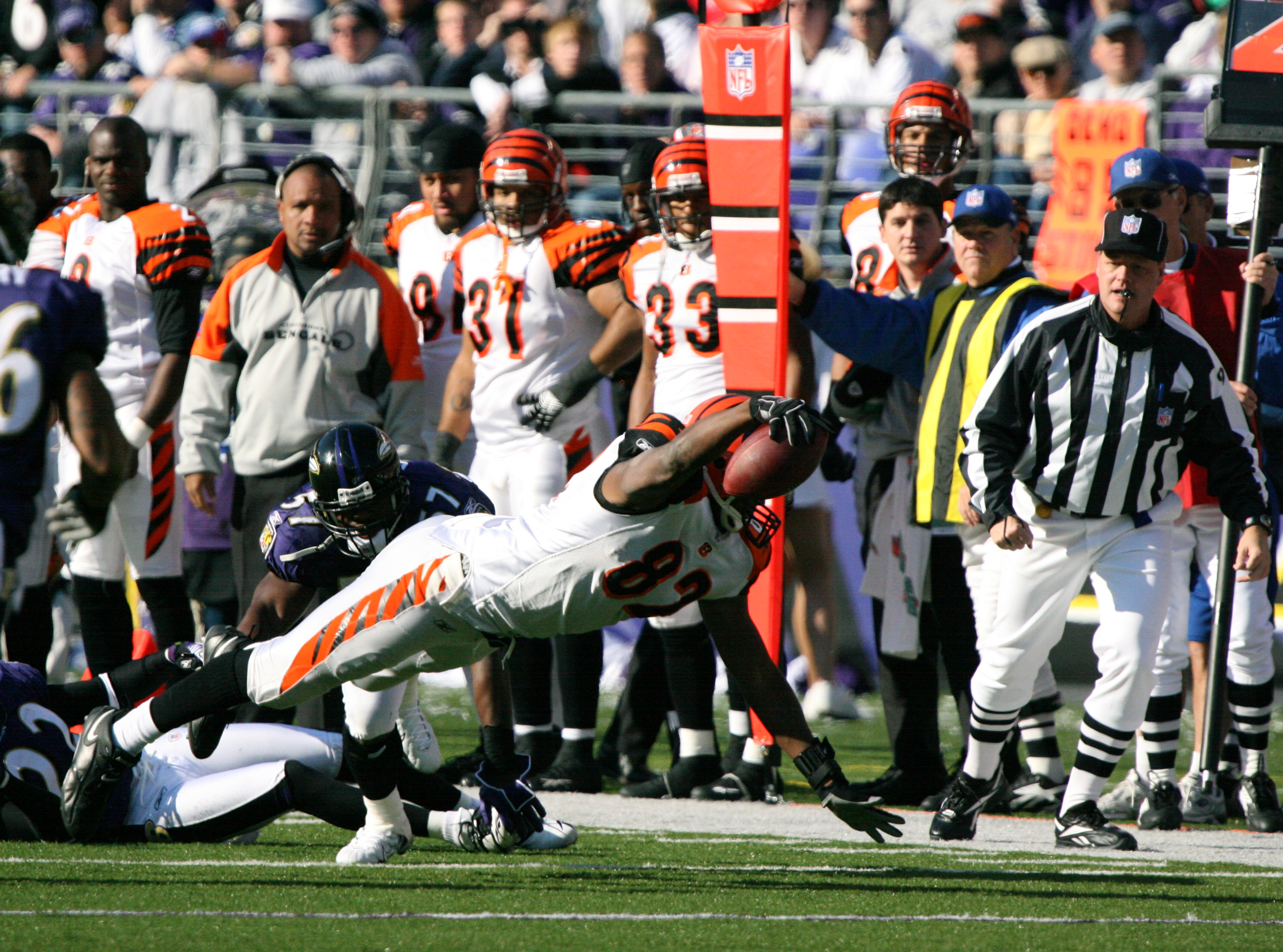
Diving catch by Reggie Kelly

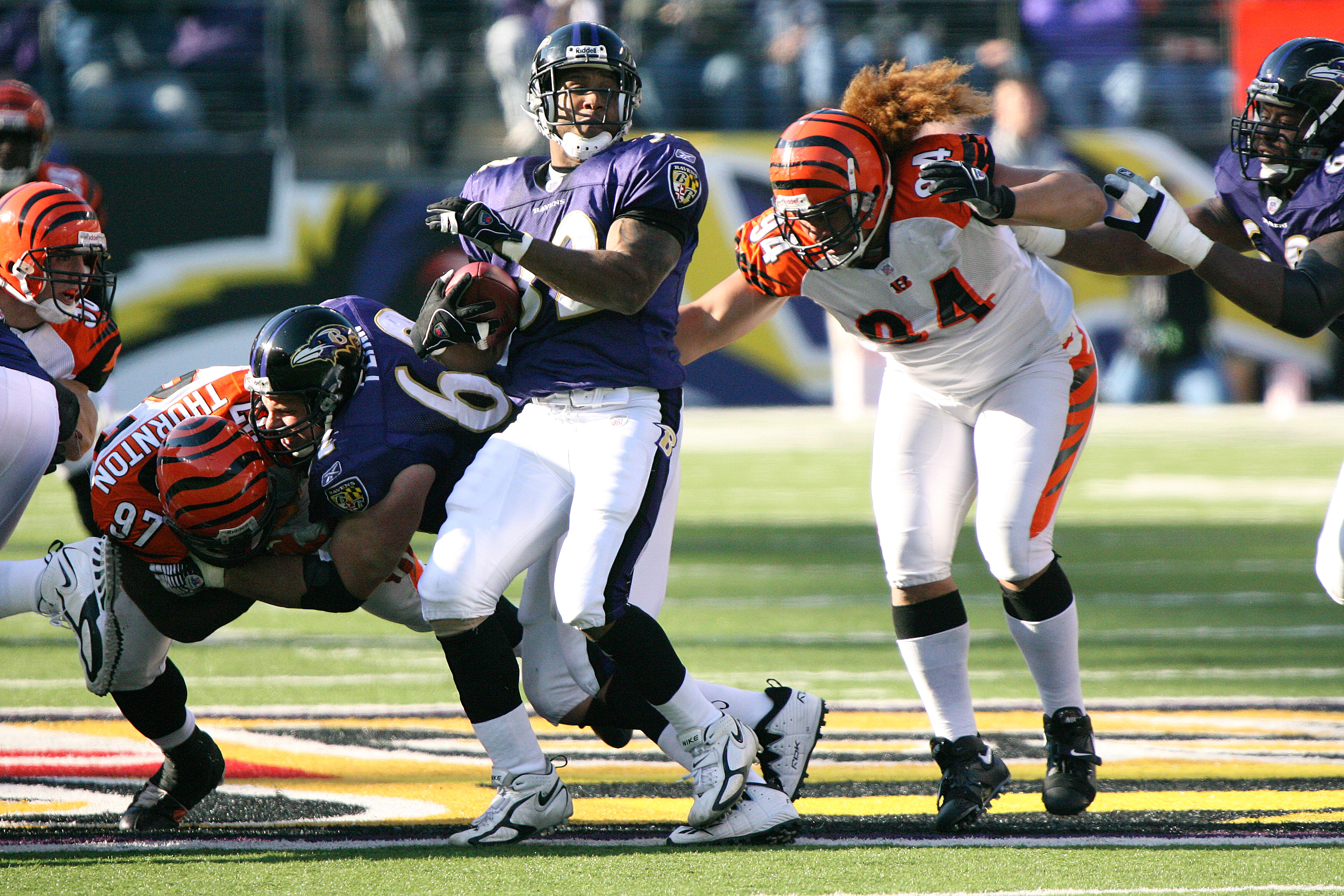
Domata Peko tackles Musa Smith

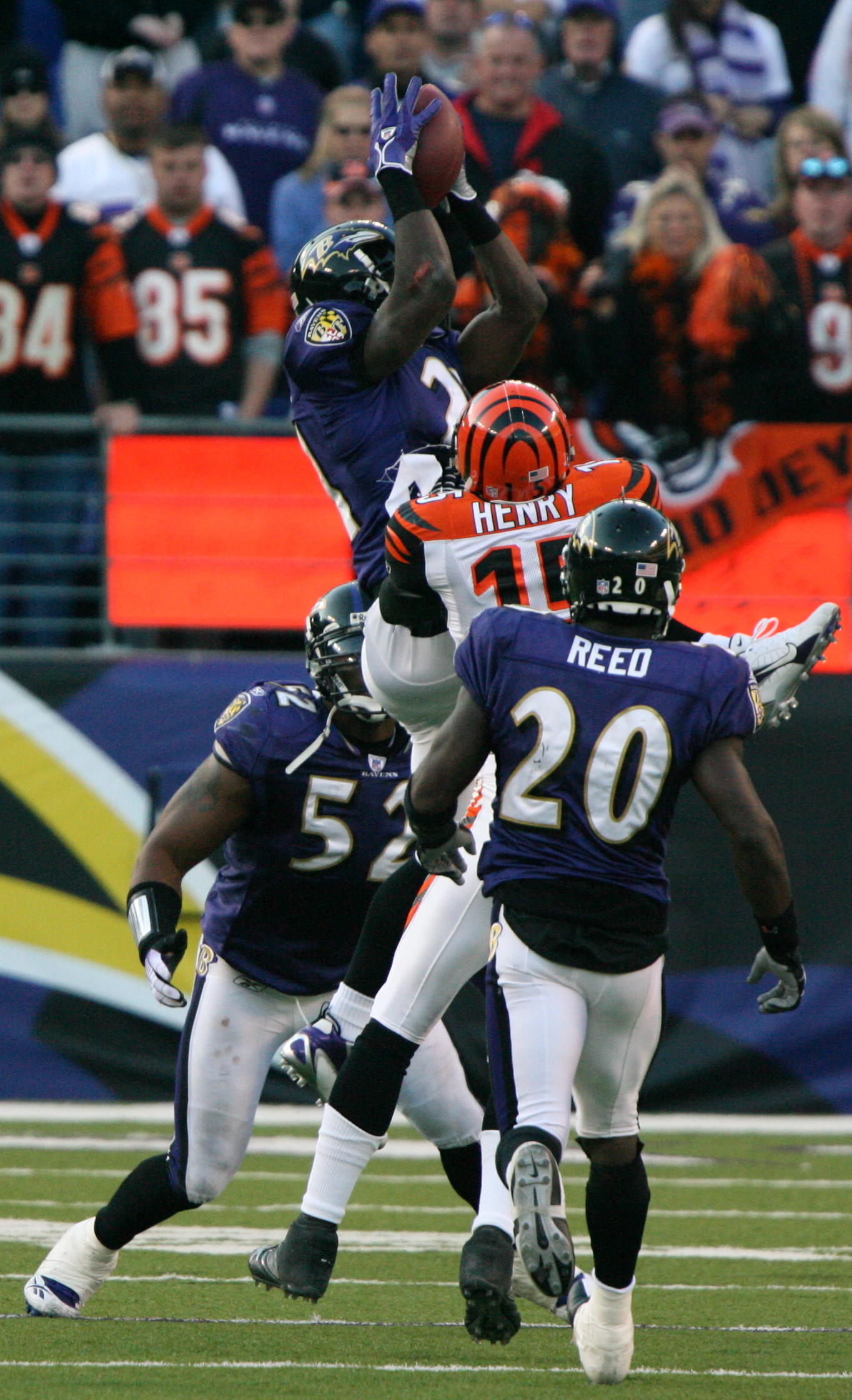
Baltimore makes an interception against Chris Henry (wide receiver)

=== Week 10 vs. San Diego Chargers ===
	1	2	3	4	Total
**Chargers**	0	7	21	21	**49**
Bengals	21	7	10	3	**41**

at Paul Brown Stadium, Cincinnati, Ohio

The Bengals were home for their Week 10 match-up with the San Diego Chargers. The Bengals struck first, with fullback Jeremi Johnson's 3-yard TD run. Running back Rudi Johnson scored next on 7-yard TD run. Quarterback Carson Palmer completed a 51-yard pass to wide receiver Chad Johnson for the third touchdown of the first quarter. In the second quarter, the Chargers managed to get on the board with running back LaDainian Tomlinson's 9-yard touchdown run. Cincinnati responded with 7-yard touchdown reception by wide receiver Chris Henry.

In the third quarter, Tomlinson scored again on a 4-yard touchdown run, and quarterback Philip Rivers threw a 46-yard touchdown pass to Charger wide receiver Malcom Floyd. The Bengals responded with kicker Shayne Graham's 21-yard field goal. The Chargers struck again on Rivers's 9-yard touchdown pass to tight end Brandon Manumaleuna. Bengals countered with Palmer throwing a 73-yard touchdown to Chad Johnson. In the fourth quarter, San Diego took the lead, when Tomlinson scored on 2-yard and 9-yard touchdown runs. Graham kicked another field goal for the Bengals, from 44 yards out, but the Chargers held the lead, and Rivers tossed a final 5-yard touchdown pass to Manumaleuna. The Bengals' record fell to 4–5 with the loss.

=== Week 11 at New Orleans Saints ===
	1	2	3	4	Total
**Bengals**	7	3	0	21	**31**
Saints	7	0	0	9	**16**

at the Louisiana Superdome, New Orleans, Louisiana

Hoping to keep slim playoff hopes alive, the Bengals traveled to the Louisiana Superdome for a Week 11 fight with the Saints. In the first quarter, the Bengals drew first blood as quarterback Carson Palmer completed a 41-yard touchdown pass to wide receiver Chad Johnson. The Saints would reply when quarterback Drew Brees completed a 72-yard touchdown strike to wide receiver Joe Horn. Midway through the second quarter, Cincinnati took the lead, when kicker Shayne Graham booted a 21-yard field goal.

After a scoreless third quarter, New Orleans still trailed by three points. In the fourth quarter, Saints kicker John Carney tied the game with a 24-yard field goal. The Bengals offense awoke, and Palmer and Johnson connected with each other two times on 60-yard and 4-yard touchdown passes. The Bengal defense scored too, when rookie defensive back Ethan Kilmer returned a Brees interception 52 yards for a touchdown. The Saints offense could only manage one more score, when Brees completed a 27-yard touchdown pass to wide receiver Terrance Copper. The Bengal defense then blocked the extra point attempt. Even though the Bengals were out-gained 595 yards to 385 yards, the Bengals snapped their three-game skid, and their record improved to 5–5.

=== Week 12: at Cleveland Browns ===
	1	2	3	4	Total
**Bengals**	7	10	6	7	**30**
Browns	0	0	0	0	**0**

at Cleveland Browns Stadium, Cleveland, Ohio

Coming off a road win over the Saints, the Bengals flew to Cleveland Browns Stadium for Round 2 of the Battle of Ohio against the Browns. From beginning to end, Cincinnati dominated the game. In the first quarter, running back Rudi Johnson scored on a 1-yard touchdown run for the only score of the period. In the second quarter, quarterback Carson Palmer completed a 7-yard touchdown pass to wide receiver Chris Henry, and kicker Shayne Graham completed a 24-yard field goal.

In the third quarter, Palmer threw a 6-yard strike to wide receiver T. J. Houshmandzadeh, but Browns defensive end, Simon Fraser, blocked the extra point. In the fourth quarter, Palmer and Henry would score again on a 10-yard touchdown pass. With their second consecutive sweep of Cleveland, the Bengal record improved to 6–5.

=== Week 13: vs. Baltimore Ravens ===
	1	2	3	4	Total
Ravens	0	0	0	7	**7**
**Bengals**	0	6	7	0	**13**

at Paul Brown Stadium, Cincinnati, Ohio

Coming off of their shutout of the Browns in Cleveland, the Bengals returned home for a Thursday night fight in an AFC North rematch against the Ravens. After a scoreless first quarter, kicker Shayne Graham scored on 23- and 27-yard field goals, which gave the Bengals the lead at halftime.

In the third quarter, the Bengals added onto their lead when quarterback Carson Palmer completed a 40-yard touchdown pass to wide receiver T. J. Houshmandzadeh on a flea flicker. In the fourth quarter, the Ravens attempted a late comeback. Quarterback Steve McNair completed a 36-yard touchdown pass to wide receiver Derrick Mason, but the Bengals squashed Baltimore's comeback, by recovering the Ravens' onside kick. With the win, the Bengals improved to 7–5.

==== Post Game ====
Chris Perry suffered a season-ending injury during this game.

Deltha O'Neal became the 8th Bengal since the 2005 – 2006 season to be arrested. He was charged with drunk driving. O'Neal was listed as "inactive" for the upcoming Raiders game.

=== Week 14: vs. Oakland Raiders ===
	1	2	3	4	Total
Raiders	0	3	0	7	**10**
**Bengals**	14	0	13	0	**27**

at Paul Brown Stadium, Cincinnati, Ohio

The Bengals week 14 game saw the 2–10 Raiders visiting Paul Brown Stadium. Chris Henry put the Bengals on the board first, on an 8-yard pass from Carson Palmer. Later in the first quarter, Rudi Johnson scored on a 9-yard run. In the second quarter, Sebastian Janikowski converted a 33-yard field goal attempt.

The Bengals struck two more times in the third quarter on 6-yard Rudi Johnson run, and a 20-yard strike from Palmer to Houshmandzadeh. The lone Raider touchdown was scored on an Aaron Brooks-to-Ronald Curry 6-yard pass in the fourth quarter. The Bengal defensive kept the Raiders offense from threatening much of the game, allowing only 45 yards rushing.

Even though quarterback Carson Palmer threw 3 interceptions (two to Nnamdi Asomugha and one to Fabian Washington), and running back Rudi Johnson turned the ball over in the second quarter, the 4 turnovers given to the Raiders were not enough opportunities for the Oakland offense to create points. Bengal mistakes were systemic, as even kicker Shayne Graham missed an extra point, bouncing the ball off the left upright in the third quarter. Cincinnati was not forced to punt once during this game. For the first time in Bengals' history, four players were over 100 yards in offensive production (Palmer, Houshmandzadeh, Chad Johnson and Rudi Johnson). The fourth straight win improved the Bengals' record to 8–5, and put them into wild card contention.

=== Week 15: at Indianapolis Colts ===
	1	2	3	4	Total
Bengals	3	7	3	3	**16**
**Colts**	3	14	14	3	**34**

at the RCA Dome, Indianapolis, Indiana

The Bengals flew to the RCA Dome for a Monday Night game with the Indianapolis Colts. In the first quarter, things started slowly, with Colts kicker Adam Vinatieri kicking a 30-yard field goal, which Bengal kicker Shayne Graham countered with a 27-yard field goal. In the second quarter, Indianapolis took the lead when quarterback Peyton Manning threw a 4-yard touchdown to wide receiver Marvin Harrison. Running back Rudi Johnson answered with a 12-yard touchdown run. Manning and Harrison scored again with a 3-yard TD pass.

In the third quarter, Graham kicked a 30-yard field goal. The four-point Colt lead would be as close as Cincinnati could pull, as Manning completed two more touchdowns: a 1-yard pass to Harrison, and an 18-yard pass to wide receiver Reggie Wayne. In the fourth quarter, Cincinnati's only score was a Graham 28-yard field goal. The Colts' Vinatieri added a final score, a 44-yard field goal, to hand the Colts an 18-point victory. The loss dropped the Bengals' record to 8–6, and delivered their division rival, the Baltimore Ravens, the AFC North crown.

=== Week 16: at Denver Broncos ===
	1	2	3	4	Total
Bengals	7	10	0	6	**23**
**Broncos**	0	14	7	3	**24**

at Invesco Field at Mile High, Denver, Colorado

The Bengals flew to Invesco Field for a snowy Week 16 intraconference game with the Broncos. In the first quarter, Cincinnati scored first with running back Rudi Johnson's 6-yard touchdown run for the only score of the period. In the second quarter, Jay Cutler tied the game at seven, with a 1-yard TD pass to tight end Tony Scheffler. Cutler then handed Denver the lead with a 39-yard touchdown pass to wide receiver Javon Walker. The Bengals cut the Bronco's lead with kicker Shayne Graham's 46-yard field goal, and quarterback Carson Palmer gave the Bengals the lead with an 11-yard touchdown pass to wide receiver Chris Henry.

In the second half, Denver pulled ahead with running back Mike Bell's 2-yard touchdown run, and kicker Jason Elam's 24-yard field goal. Cincinnati would pull within one point with Palmer's 10-yard touchdown pass to wide receiver T. J. Houshmandzadeh. On the extra point attempt, holder Kyle Larson allowed the snap to fly between his hands, securing the Broncos' win. The Bengal loss dropped their record to 8–7.

=== Week 17 vs. Pittsburgh Steelers ===
	1	2	3	4	OT	Total
**Steelers**	0	7	0	10	6	**23**
Bengals	0	3	0	14	0	**17**

at Paul Brown Stadium, Cincinnati, Ohio

The Bengals wrapped up their regular season at home with a must-win AFC North rematch game against the Pittsburgh Steelers. The Bengals had two possible options for reaching the post-season:

- 1 – A Bengals win and a Jets loss, or
- 2 – A Kansas City Chiefs win, a Denver Broncos loss, and a Bengals win.

After a scoreless first quarter, the Steelers struck first when running back Willie Parker scored a 1-yard touchdown run. Cincinnati got on the board when Shayne Graham kicked a 34-yard field goal.

After a scoreless third quarter, the Bengals took the lead after recovering a Willie Parker fumble for a touchback. Quarterback Carson Palmer completed a 66-yard touchdown to wide receiver Chris Henry. Undaunted, Pittsburgh retook the lead when Parker scored on a 1-yard touchdown run. Cincinnati would again retake the lead when Palmer completed a 5-yard touchdown pass to tight end Tony Stewart. The Steelers tied the game late in the 4th quarter when kicker Jeff Reed kicked a 35-yard field goal. The Bengals managed to move into field goal range, but, Graham's potential game-winning 39-yard field goal attempt went wide right.

In overtime, the Steelers won when quarterback Ben Roethlisberger threw a 67-yard touchdown pass to wide receiver Santonio Holmes. With the loss, Cincinnati fell to 8–8, and their season-ending, three consecutive losses, eliminated the Bengals from the playoffs. In a cruel twist of fate, the Chiefs defeated the Jaguars and the Broncos lost to the 49ers, meaning that the Bengals cost themselves a playoff berth. It was Marvin Lewis' third 8–8 season in his four years as the Bengals head coach.

=== Standings ===
AFC North
	W	L	T	PCT	DIV	CONF	PF	PA	STK
^{(2)} Baltimore Ravens	13	3	0	.813	5–1	10–2	353	201	W4
Cincinnati Bengals	8	8	0	.500	4–2	6–6	373	331	L3
Pittsburgh Steelers	8	8	0	.500	3–3	5–7	353	315	W1
Cleveland Browns	4	12	0	.250	0–6	3–9	238	356	L4

== Team leaders ==
=== Passing ===
Player	Att	Comp	Yds	TD	INT	Rating
Carson Palmer	520	324	4035	28	13	93.9

=== Rushing ===
Player	Att	Yds	YPC	Long	TD
Rudi Johnson	341	1309	3.8	22	12

=== Receiving ===
Player	Rec	Yds	Avg	Long	TD
T. J. Houshmandzadeh	90	1081	12.0	40	9
Chad Johnson	87	1369	15.7	74	7
Chris Henry	36	605	16.8	71	9

=== Defensive ===
Player	Tackles	Sacks	INTs	FF	FR
Landon Johnson	132	0.5	1	3	0
Robert Geathers	52	10.5	0	0	0
Kevin Kaesviharn	58	4.0	6	1	0

=== Kicking and punting ===
Player	FGA	FGM	FG%	XPA	XPM	XP%	Points
Shayne Graham	30	25	83.3%	42	40	95.2%	115

Player	Punts	Yards	Long	Blkd	Avg.
Kyle Larson	77	3428	67	0	44.5

=== Special teams ===
Player	KR	KRYards	KRAvg	KRLong	KRTD	PR	PRYards	PRAvg	PRLong	PRTD
Chris Perry	21	412	19.6	36	0	0	0	0.0	0	0
Keiwan Ratliff	0	0	0.0	0	0	27	176	6.5	38	0

== Awards and Milestones ==
=== Pro Bowl selections ===
- Carson Palmer QB, AFC Pro Bowl selection
- Chad Johnson WR, AFC Pro Bowl selection
- Willie Anderson RT, AFC Pro Bowl selection

=== All-Pro selections ===
- Chad Johnson WR, first-team All-Pro
- Willie Anderson RT, first-team All-Pro

=== Milestones ===
- Carson Palmer 1st 4000 yard passing season (4,035 yards)
- Rudi Johnson 3rd 1000 yard rushing season (1,309 yards)
- Chad Johnson 5th 1000 yard receiving season (1,369 yards)

== See also ==
- List of organizational conflicts in the NFL
