= Manderino =

Manderino is a surname. Notable people with the surname include:

- Chris Manderino (born 1982), American football player
- James J. Manderino (1932–1989), American politician
- Kathy Manderino (born 1958), American politician
