= Domata Peko =

American football player and coach (born 1984)

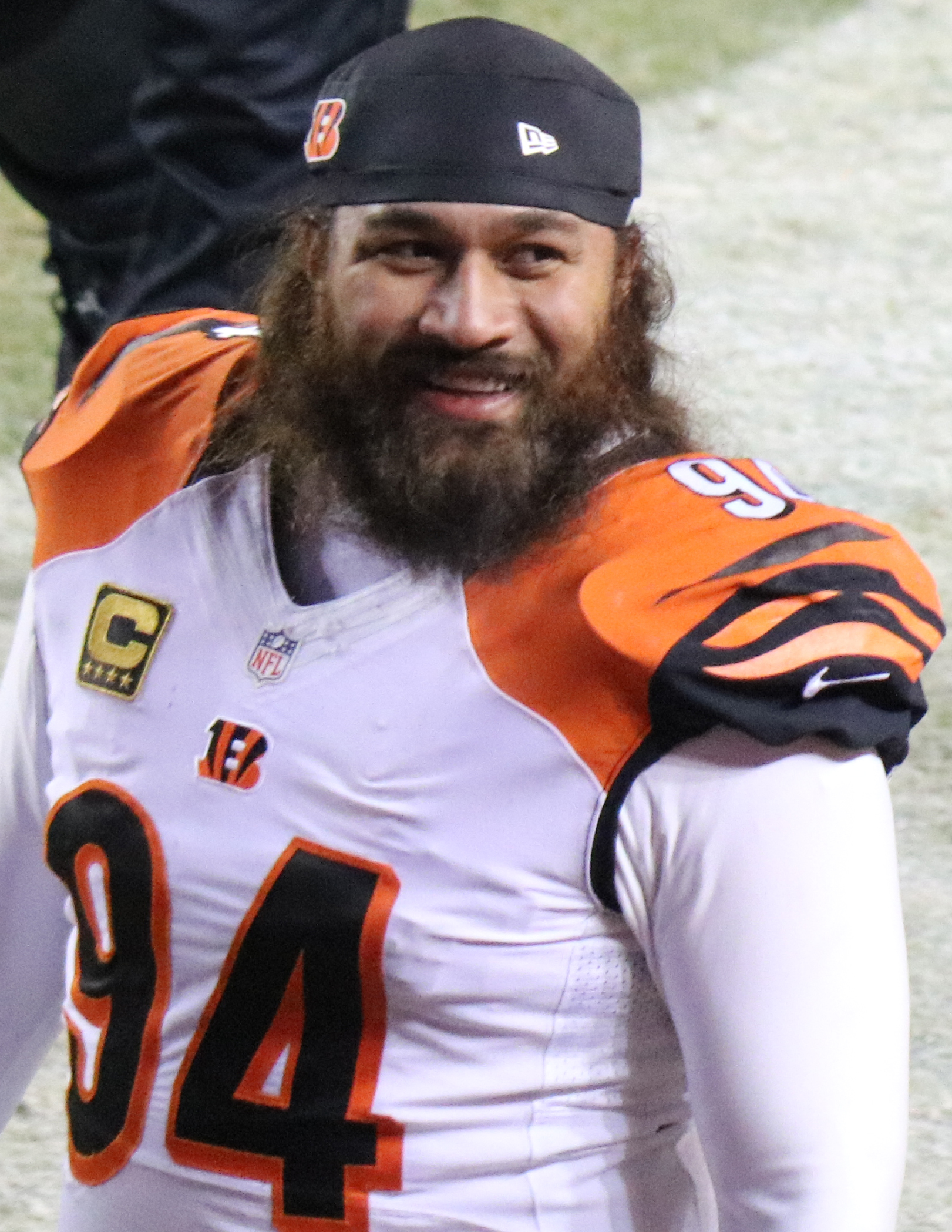
- Peko with the Cincinnati Bengals in 2015

Pittsburgh Steelers
- Title: Defensive line coach

Personal information
- Born: November 27, 1984 (age 41); Los Angeles, California, U.S.
- Listed height: 6 ft 3 in (1.91 m)
- Listed weight: 325 lb (147 kg)

Career information
- Position: Defensive tackle (No. 94, 96)
- High school: Samoana (Utulei, American Samoa)
- College: Canyons (2002–2003); Michigan State (2004–2005)
- NFL draft: 2006: 4th round, 123rd overall pick

Career history

Playing
- Cincinnati Bengals (2006–2016); Denver Broncos (2017–2018); Baltimore Ravens (2019); Arizona Cardinals (2020)

Coaching
- Dallas Cowboys (2024) Defensive assistant; Colorado (2025) Defensive line coach; Pittsburgh Steelers (2026–present) Defensive line coach

Career NFL statistics
- Total tackles: 616
- Sacks: 20.0
- Forced fumbles: 3
- Fumble recoveries: 5
- 20: 14
- Stats at Pro Football Reference

Domata Uluaifaasau Peko Sr (born November 27, 1984) is an American-Samoan professional football coach and former nose tackle who is currently the defensive line coach for the Pittsburgh Steelers of the National Football League (NFL). Peko was born in Los Angeles, California and grew up in Pago Pago, American Samoa. He played college football at Michigan State and was drafted by the Cincinnati Bengals in the fourth round of the 2006 NFL draft.

== College career ==
Peko started his college football at College of the Canyons before transferring to Michigan State University. He wore number 96 for the Spartans who were coached by John L. Smith at the time. As a senior, he made 53 tackles. One of the most memorable moments of his career was against archrival Michigan when he returned a Chad Henne fumble for a touchdown in front of a roaring crowd at Spartan Stadium. He was a sociology major.

== Professional career ==
Peko attended the NFL Scouting Combine in Indianapolis and completed all of the combine drills and positional drills. On March 18, 2006, he participated at Michigan State's pro day, but opted to stand on his combine numbers and only ran positional drills. At the conclusion of the pre-draft process, Peko was projected to be a fifth or sixth round pick by NFL draft experts and scouts. He was ranked as the 19th best defensive tackle prospect in the draft by Scouts Inc. and was also ranked the 21st best defensive tackle prospect by DraftScout.com.

Pre-draft measurables
Height	Weight	Arm length	Hand span	40-yard dash	10-yard split	20-yard split	20-yard shuttle	Three-cone drill	Vertical jump	Broad jump	Bench press
6 ft 2 3/4 in (1.90 m)	307 lb (139 kg)	32 7/8 in (0.84 m)	10 in (0.25 m)	5.25 s	1.76 s	3.03 s	4.49 s	7.69 s	28.5 in (0.72 m)	8 ft 7 in (2.62 m)	25 reps
All values from NFL Combine

=== Cincinnati Bengals ===
The Cincinnati Bengals selected Peko in the fourth round (123rd overall) of the 2006 NFL draft. Peko was the seventh defensive tackle drafted in 2006.

==== 2006 ====
On July 28, 2006, the Cincinnati Bengals signed Peko to a four-year, $2.02 million contract that includes a signing bonus of $407,000.

Peko entered training camp slated as a backup defensive tackle. Head coach Marvin Lewis named Peko a backup defensive tackle to start the regular season in 2006, behind Sam Adams and John Thornton.

He made his professional regular season debut in the Cincinnati Bengals' season-opener at the Kansas City Chiefs and recorded two solo tackles in their 23–10 victory. On October 29, 2006, Peko collected a season-high seven combined tackles and made his first career sack during a 29–27 loss against the Atlanta Falcons in Week 8. Peko's first career sack was on Falcons' quarterback Michael Vick, as he made an eight-yard sack on Vick with teammate Justin Smith in the fourth quarter. On November 30, 2006, Peko earned his first career start after John Thornton suffered a wrist injury. He finished the Bengals' 13–7 win against the Baltimore Ravens with two combined tackles. In Week 16, Peko recorded six combined tackles and made a season-high two sacks on Broncos' quarterback Jay Cutler in the Bengals' 24–23 loss at the Denver Broncos. He finished his rookie season in 2006 with 43 combined tackles (21 solo), 2.5 sacks, and two forced fumbles in 16 games and one start.

==== 2007 ====
Throughout training camp in 2007, Peko competed to be a starting defensive tackle against Michael Myers, John Thornton, Kenderick Allen, and Matt Toeaina. Head coach Marvin Lewis named Peko a starting defensive tackle to begin the 2007 NFL season. He started alongside John Thornton and defensive ends Justin Smith and Robert Geathers.

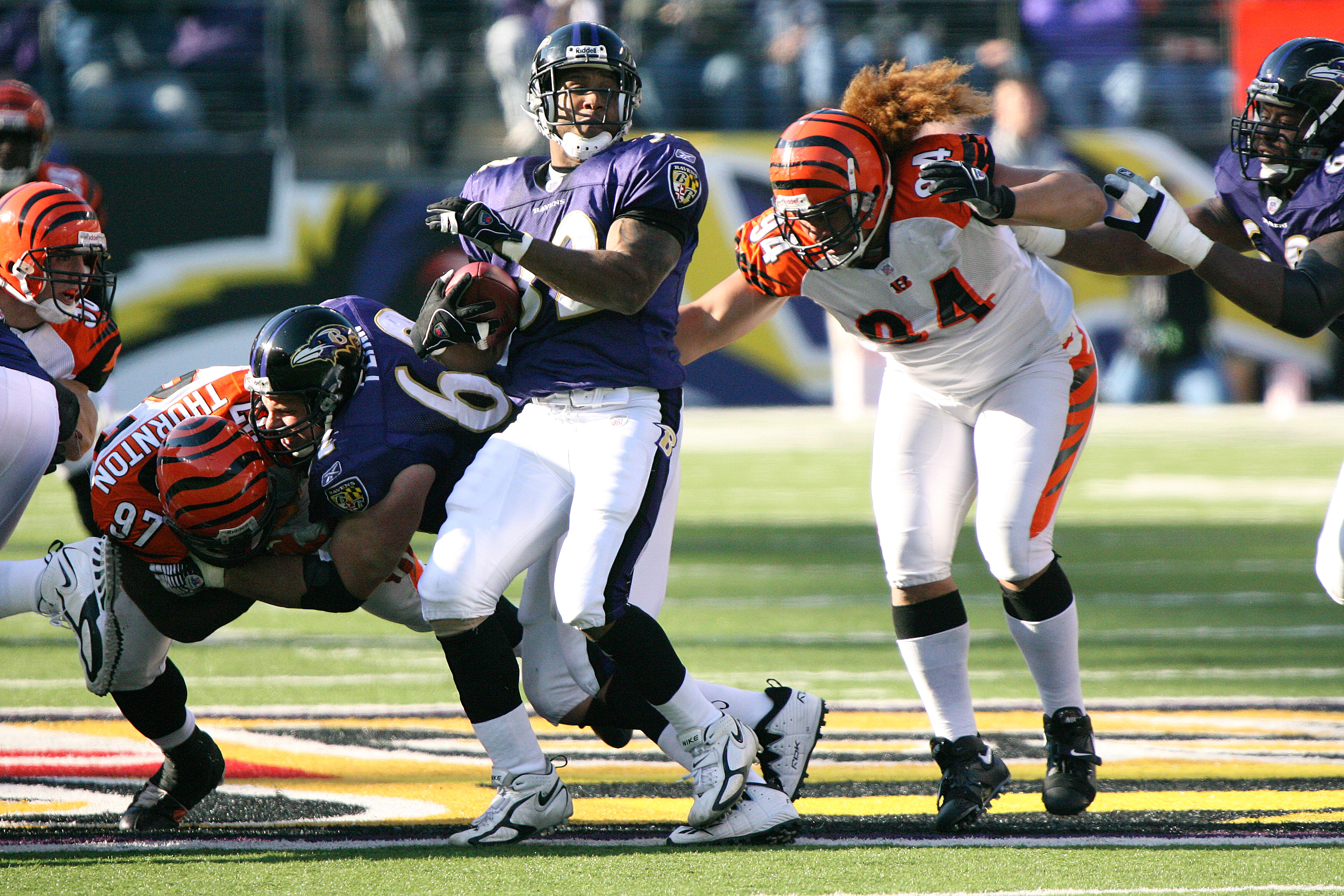
Peko (#94) prepares to tackle Musa Smith (#32) of the Baltimore Ravens

In Week 8, Peko recorded three combined tackles and made his first career solo sack on Steelers' quarterback Ben Roethlisberger during the third quarter of the Bengals' 24–13 loss to the Pittsburgh Steelers. On December 15, 2007, he collected a season-high nine combined tackles and was credited with half a sack in the Bengals' 20–13 loss at the San Francisco 49ers in Week 15. He started in all 16 games in 2007 and recorded 52 combined tackles (36 solo), 1.5 sacks, a pass deflection, and a fumble recovery.

==== 2008 ====
On January 2, 2008, the Cincinnati Bengals fired defensive coordinator Chuck Bresnahan after the defense ranked 27th in the league for total defense in 2007. On January 15, 2008, the Cincinnati Bengals named former Atlanta Falcons' defensive coordinator Mike Zimmer as their new defensive coordinator. Zimmer retained Peko and John Thornton as the starting defensive tackles in 2008.

On July 13, 2008, the Cincinnati Bengals signed Peko to a five-year, $27.70 million contract that includes $8.50 million guaranteed. On October 12, 2008, Peko collected a season-high eight combined tackles in the Bengals' 26–14 loss at the New York Jets in Week 6. Peko started in all 16 games in 2008 and recorded a career-high 67 combined tackles (29 solo), two passes defended, and was credited with half a sack.

==== 2009 ====
Peko returned as a starting defensive tackle in 2009 and started alongside Tank Johnson and defensive ends Robert Geathers and Antwan Odom. In Week 4, he collected a season-high five combined tackles during a 23–20 win at the Cleveland Browns. On November 29, 2009, Peko made one tackle before exiting in the third quarter of the Bengals' 16–7 win against the Cleveland Browns in Week 12 due to a knee injury. On December 7, 2009, it was reported Peko had undergone arthroscopic surgery on his knee and he was inactive for the last five games of the season (Weeks 13–17). He finished the 2009 NFL season with 23 combined tackles (12 solo) and a pass deflection in 11 games and 11 starts. The Cincinnati Bengals finished first in the AFC North with a 10–6 record in 2009. On January 9, 2010, Peko started in his first career playoff game and recorded four combined tackles in their 24–14 loss to the New York Jets in the AFC Wild Card Round.

==== 2010 ====
Head coach Marvin Lewis named Peko the starting nose tackle in 2010, alongside defensive ends Antwan Odom and Robert Geathers. On November 25, 2010, Peko collected a season-high seven combined tackles and broke up a pass in the Bengals' 26–10 loss at the New York Jets in Week 12. Peko started in all 16 games in 2010 and recorded 42 combined tackles (24 solo), one pass deflection, and was credited with half a sack.

==== 2011 ====
Head coach Marvin Lewis named Peko a starting nose tackle to start the regular season in 2011. He started alongside defensive ends Michael Johnson and Robert Geathers. In Week 3, Peko collected a season-high eight combined tackles in the Bengals' 13–8 loss to the San Francisco 49ers. He started in all 16 games in 2011 and recorded 66 combined tackles (34 solo), 2.5 sacks, one forced fumble, and a fumble recovery.

The Cincinnati Bengals finished third in the AFC North with a 9–7 record and earned a wild card berth in 2011. On January 7, 2012, Peko recorded four solo tackles in the Bengals' 31–10 loss at the Houston Texans in the AFC Wild Card Round.

==== 2012 ====
Peko retained his job as the starting nose tackle in 2012. In Week 6, he collected a season-high six combined tackles and broke up a pass in the Bengals' 34–24 loss at the Cleveland Browns. On December 30, 2012, Peko tied his season-high of six combined tackles during a 23–17 win against the Baltimore Ravens in Week 17. He started in all 16 games and recorded 53 combined tackles (23 solo), three pass deflections, two sacks, and a fumble recovery. The Cincinnati Bengals earned a wildcard berth with a 10–6 record in 2012. The Bengals were eliminated after a 19–13 loss at the Houston Texans in the AFC Wild Card Round. Peko finished the game with four combined tackles.

==== 2013 ====
Defensive coordinator Mike Zimmer retained Peko as the starting nose tackle in 2013. Peko started alongside defensive ends Carlos Dunlap and Michael Johnson. On December 29, 2013, Peko collected a season-high eight combined tackles in the Bengals' 34–17 win against the Baltimore Ravens. He started in all 16 games and recorded 52 combined tackles (24 solo) and three sacks. The Cincinnati Bengals finished atop the AFC North with an 11–5 record in 2013 and earned a playoff berth. On January 5, 2014, Peko recorded two solo tackles as the Bengals lost 27–10 to the San Diego Chargers in the AFC Wild Card Round.

==== 2014 ====
On January 15, 2014, the Cincinnati Bengals promoted linebackers coach Paul Guenther to defensive coordinator after Mike Zimmer accepted the head coaching position with the Minnesota Vikings.

On March 26, 2014, the Cincinnati Bengals signed Peko to a two-year, $9 million contract extension that includes $4.40 million guaranteed. Defensive coordinator Paul Guenther retained Peko as the starting nose tackle. He started alongside Wallace Gilberry and Carlos Dunlap in 2014.

In Week 5, he collected a season-high eight combined tackles in the Bengals' 43–17 loss at the New England Patriots. On November 16, 2014, he tied his season-high of eight combined tackles during a 27–10 win at the New Orleans Saints in Week 11. He started in all 16 games in 2014 and recorded 46 combined tackles (26 solo) and one sack. The Cincinnati Bengals finished the season with a 10–5–1 record, but lost 10–26 in the AFC Wild Card Round at the Indianapolis Colts.

==== 2015 ====
On October 4, 2015, Peko made two solo tackles and made a career-high two sacks on Chiefs' quarterback Alex Smith during a 36–21 win against the Kansas City Chiefs in Week 4. The following week, he collected a season-high four combined tackles in the Bengals' 27–24 win against the Seattle Seahawks in Week 5. He started all 16 games at nose tackle in 2015 and recorded 35 combined tackles (17 solo), a career-high five sacks, and a pass deflection. The Bengals finished atop the AFC North with a 12–4 record in 2015, but were eliminated from the playoffs after losing 18–16 to the Pittsburgh Steelers in the AFC Wild Card Round.

==== 2016 ====
Peko returned as the starting nose tackle, alongside defensive ends Michael Johnson and Carlos Dunlap in 2016. In Week 3, he collected a season-high five combined tackles in the Bengals' 29–17 loss to the Denver Broncos. Peko started in all 16 games in 2016 and recorded 37 combined tackles (17 solo) and three pass deflections. The Cincinnati Bengals did not qualify for the playoffs in 2016 after finishing with a 6–9–1 record.

=== Denver Broncos ===
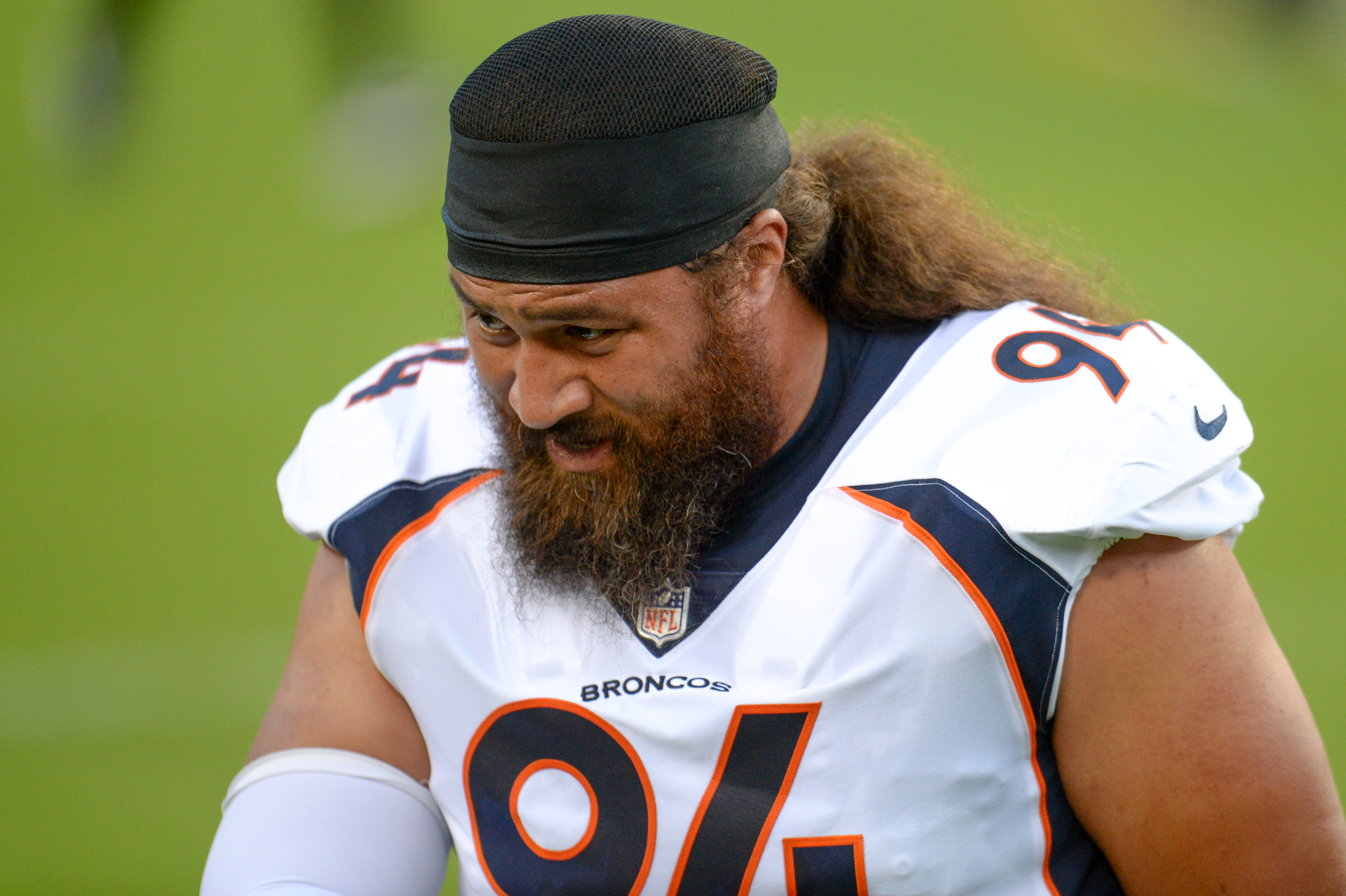
Peko playing for the Broncos in 2018.

On March 11, 2017, the Denver Broncos signed Peko to a two-year, $7.50 million contract with $3.80 million guaranteed and a signing bonus of $1 million.

Head coach Vance Joseph named Peko the starting nose tackle to begin the regular season, alongside defensive ends Jared Crick and Derek Wolfe. On October 15, 2017, Peko collected a season-high seven combined tackles in the Broncos' 23–10 loss against the New York Giants in Week 6. On November 26, 2017, Peko made six combined tackles before exiting in the fourth quarter of the Broncos' 21–14 loss at the Oakland Raiders due to a sprained MCL. His injury sidelined him for the next two games (Weeks 13–14) and ended his streak of 123 consecutive starts. He started in 14 games in 2017 and recorded 38 combined tackles (24 solo) and a sack.

In the 2018 season, Peko appeared in and started all 16 games. He finished with a half-sack, 31 total tackles (20 solo), and two passes defended.

=== Baltimore Ravens ===
On November 12, 2019, Peko was signed by the Baltimore Ravens. He played in seven games and started in three in the 2019 season.

=== Arizona Cardinals ===
On November 23, 2020, Peko signed with the Arizona Cardinals. He played in six games and started five in the 2020 season.

== NFL career statistics ==
Year	Team	Games		Tackles					Interceptions						Fumbles	
Year	Team	GP	GS	Cmb	Solo	Ast	Sck	Sfty	PD	Int	Yds	Avg	Lng	TD	FF	FR
2006	CIN	16	1	43	21	22	2.5	0	0	0	0	0.0	0	0	1	0
2007	CIN	16	16	52	36	16	1.5	0	1	0	0	0.0	0	0	0	1
2008	CIN	16	16	67	29	38	0.5	0	2	0	0	0.0	0	0	0	0
2009	CIN	11	11	23	12	11	0.0	0	1	0	0	0.0	0	0	0	0
2010	CIN	16	16	42	24	18	0.5	0	1	0	0	0.0	0	0	0	0
2011	CIN	16	16	66	34	32	2.5	0	0	0	0	0.0	0	0	1	1
2012	CIN	16	16	53	23	30	2.0	0	3	0	0	0.0	0	0	0	1
2013	CIN	16	16	52	24	28	3.0	0	0	0	0	0.0	0	0	0	0
2014	CIN	16	16	46	26	20	1.0	0	0	0	0	0.0	0	0	0	0
2015	CIN	16	16	35	17	18	5.0	0	1	0	0	0.0	0	0	0	0
2016	CIN	16	16	37	17	20	0.0	0	3	0	0	0.0	0	0	0	1
2017	DEN	14	14	38	24	14	1.0	0	0	0	0	0.0	0	0	0	1
2018	DEN	16	16	31	20	11	0.5	0	2	0	0	0.0	0	0	0	0
2019	BAL	7	3	14	7	7	0.0	0	0	0	0	0.0	0	0	0	0
2020	ARI	6	5	16	6	10	0.0	0	0	0	0	0.0	0	0	0	0
Career		214	194	616	321	295	20.0	0	14	0	0	0.0	0	0	2	5

== Coaching career ==
In 2024, Peko joined the Dallas Cowboys, as an assistant coach under his former Cincinnati Bengals Defensive Coordinator, Mike Zimmer.

As of 2025, Peko is the defensive line coach for the University of Colorado Buffaloes.

On February 4, 2026, the Pittsburgh Steelers hired Peko as their defensive line coach under new head coach Mike McCarthy.

== Personal life ==
Domata's brother, Tupe Peko, also played in the NFL and went to Michigan State. Domata's cousin, Kyle Peko, was his teammate on the Denver Broncos during the 2017 NFL season. Domata is married and has three children. His son Domata Jr. plays as an edge rusher and is currently a commit for the Colorado Buffaloes.
