= Chris Manderino =

American football player (born 1982)

No. 37
- Position: Fullback

Personal information
- Born: December 22, 1982 (age 43); Anaheim, California, U.S.
- Listed height: 6 ft 1 in (1.85 m)
- Listed weight: 231 lb (105 kg)

Career information
- College: California
- NFL draft: 2006: undrafted

Career history
- Cincinnati Bengals (2006–2007)*; Kansas City Chiefs (2008)*
- * Offseason or practice squad member only

Chris Manderino (born December 22, 1982) is an American former football fullback. He was originally signed by the Cincinnati Bengals as an undrafted free agent in 2006.

== Early life ==
Manderino was born on December 22, 1982, in Anaheim, California. He scored a school and district record 31 touchdowns in his senior year earning him league MVP honors, and his 2,200 career rushing yards were the second-best recorded in school history. Manderino also participated in the Orange County All-Star Game and the L.A. vs. Orange County All-Star Game.

Manderino's father, Paul played defensive end and fullback at Michigan State University.

== College career ==
Mandirino was redshirted in 2001, and played college football as the starting fullback for the California Golden Bears from 2002 to 2005.

== Professional career ==
=== Kansas City Chiefs ===
Manderino was released by the Kansas City Chiefs during the final roster cuts in August 2008.

=== Bologna Doves ===
Manderino signed with the Bologna Doves, an Italian football team in 2009 where he excelled as a running back and linebacker. He then coached the Doves' junior team for their 2009 season. Manderino documented his time abroad in a blog.

== Post-Retirement ==
=== LYFE Fuel and Plant-based Diet Advocacy ===
Following his retirement, Manderino studied dietary nutrition and sports training theory, becoming an advocate for a plant-based lifestyle. Manderino launched the LyfeFuel brand of plant-protein drinks and supplements in 2016.
