= Irons (surname) =

Irons is the surname of:

== People ==
- Andy Irons (1978–2010), American surfer
- Bill Irons, American evolutionary anthropologist and professor emeritus
- Bruce Irons (engineer) (1924–1983), English-born Canadian engineer and mathematician
- Bruce Irons (surfer) (born 1979), American surfer
- David Irons (born 1982), American football player
- Davie Irons (born 1961), Scottish footballer
- Edward Irons (1923–2022), American economist and writer
- Edward D. Irons Jr. (born 1954), American record producer and songwriter
- Eric Irons (1921–2007), Britain's first black magistrate and equal rights activist
- Ernest E. Irons (1877–1959), American physician, president of the American Medical Association, the American College of Physicians and the American Association for the Study and Control of Rheumatic Diseases
- Evelyn Irons (1900–2000), Scottish journalist and World War II war correspondent
- Frank Irons (1886–1942), American Olympic long jumper and high jumper
- Gerald Irons (1947–2021), American football player
- Greg Irons (1947–1984), American poster artist, underground cartoonist, animator and tattoo artist
- Grant Irons (born 1979), American football player
- Herbert Stephen Irons (1834–1905), English organist
- Jack Irons (born 1962), American founding drummer of the rock band Red Hot Chili Peppers and former member of Pearl Jam
- James Anderson Irons (1857–1921), United States Army brigadier general
- Janine Irons (fl. 1991–present), British music educator, artist manager and producer
- Jarrett Irons, American college football player
- Jeremy Irons (born 1948), English actor
- Kenny Irons (born 1983), American football player
- Kenny Irons (footballer) (born 1970), English footballer
- Maleek Irons (born 1996), retired Canadian football player
- Max Irons (born 1985), English actor
- Norman Irons, Lord Provost of Edinburgh, Scotland
- Paul Irons (born 1983), American football player
- Paulette Irons (born 1952), American city court judge
- Peter Irons (born 1940), American political activist
- Robbie Irons (born 1946), American ice hockey player
- Steve Irons (born 1958), Australian politician
- Tammy Irons (born 1963), American politician
- William Josiah Irons (1812–1883), English priest

== Fictional characters ==
- Jonathan Irons, the main antagonist in the 2014 video game Call of Duty: Advanced Warfare
- Steel (John Henry Irons), a superhero in the DC Universe
- Kenneth Irons, a comic book evil mastermind
- Natasha Irons, a superhero in the DC Universe
- Vallery Irons, protagonist of the American television series V.I.P., played by Pamela Anderson

== See also ==
- Senator Irons (disambiguation)
