= Iron Township =

Iron Township is the name of two townships in the U.S. state of Missouri:

- Iron Township, Iron County, Missouri
- Iron Township, Saint Francois County, Missouri

== See also ==
- Iron (disambiguation)
- Iron River Township, Michigan
- Iron Range Township, Itasca County, Minnesota
