= 2007 Cincinnati Bengals season =

NFL team season

- Owner: Mike Brown
- Head coach: Marvin Lewis
- Offensive coordinator: Bob Bratkowski
- Defensive coordinator: Chuck Bresnahan
- Home stadium: Paul Brown Stadium

Results
- Record: 7–9
- Division place: 3rd AFC North
- Playoffs: Did not qualify
- Pro Bowlers: WR Chad Johnson; WR T. J. Houshmandzadeh

Uniform
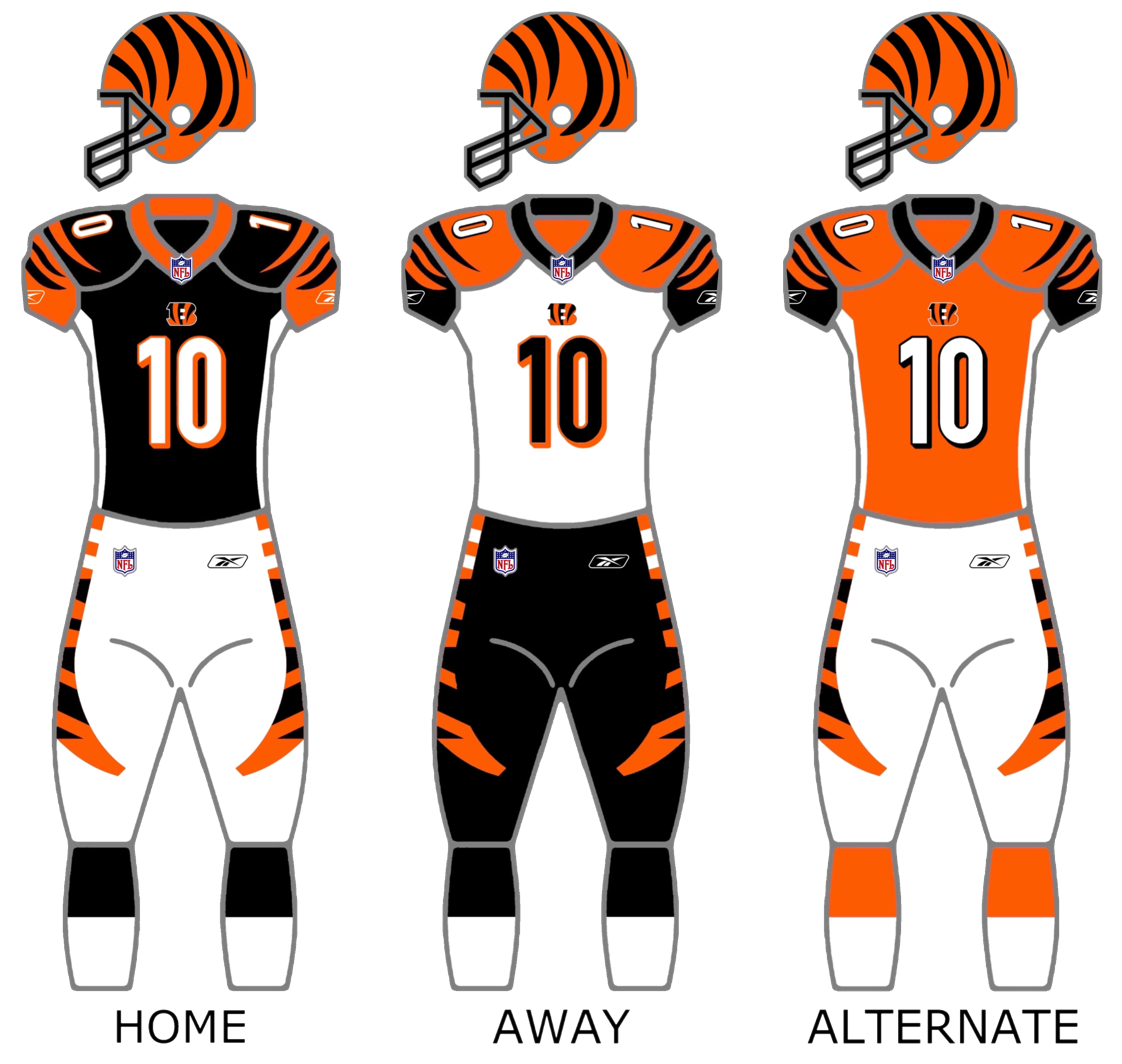

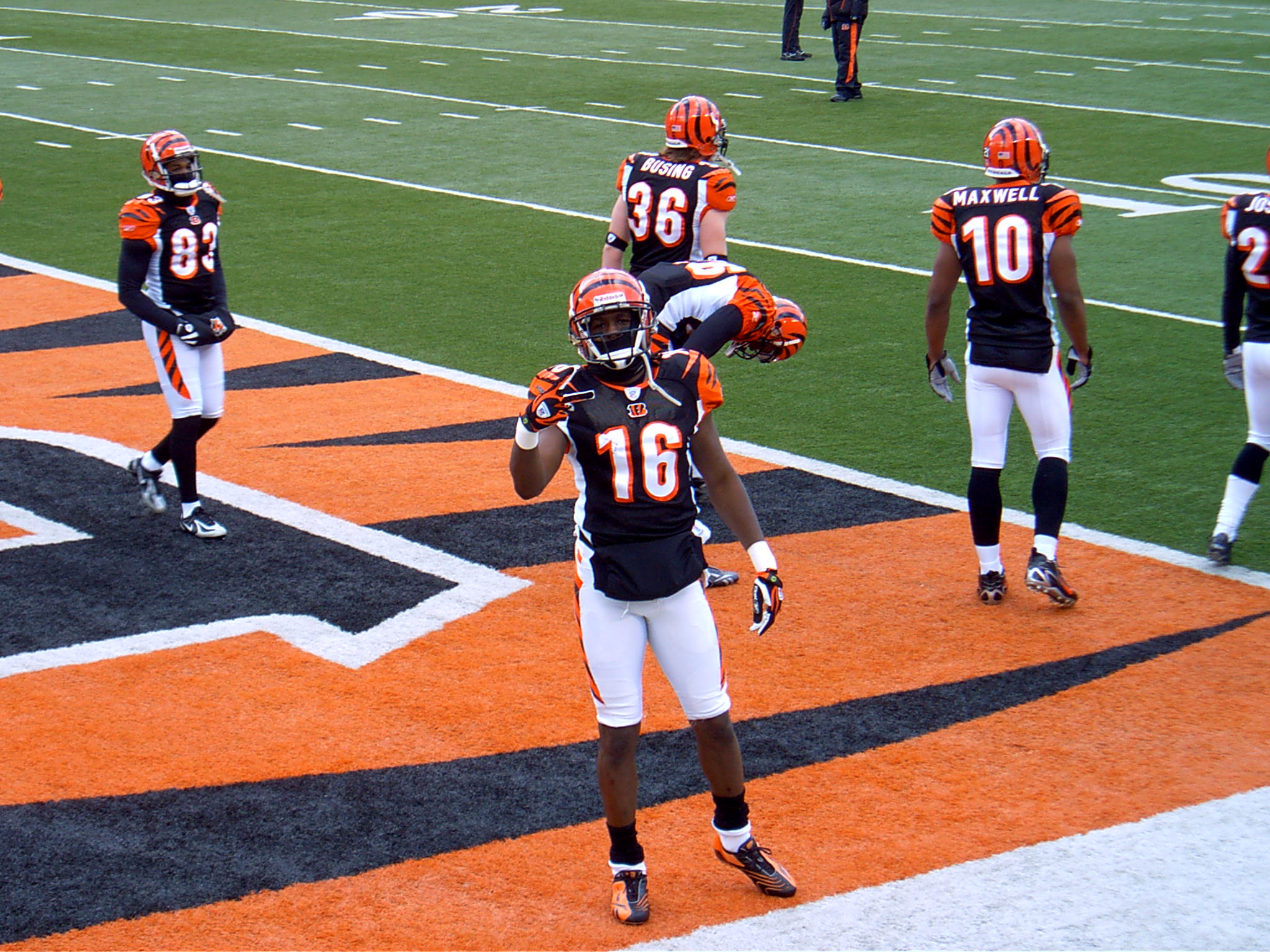
Glenn Holt and Cincinnati players prior to their December 23 match against the Cleveland Browns

The 2007 Cincinnati Bengals season was the 38th season for the team in the National Football League (NFL) and their 40th overall season. The team attempted to improve upon their 8–8 record in 2006 and were looking to return to the playoffs after narrowly missing them. They failed to do so, finishing with a 7–9 record.

During the season, kicker Shayne Graham scored a record-breaking 21 consecutive field goals. His record would eventually be broken by Evan McPherson in 2026.

== Offseason ==
=== Coaching changes ===
Head coach Marvin Lewis entered his fifth year with the Bengals. He was joined by offensive coordinator Bob Bratkowski and defensive coordinator Chuck Bresnahan.

=== Personnel moves ===
Offseason personnel moves
Transaction	Position	Name	To/From
---	Safety	Kevin Kaesviharn	To New Orleans Saints
---	Guard	Eric Steinbach	To Cleveland Browns
---	Linebacker	Brian Simmons	To New Orleans Saints
---	Tight end	Tony Stewart	To Oakland Raiders
---	Linebacker	Marcus Wilkins	To Atlanta Falcons
---	Wide receiver	Kelley Washington	To New England Patriots
---	Defensive tackle	Shaun Smith	To Cleveland Browns
Retired	Center	Rich Braham	Retirement
---	Cornerback	Tory James	To New England Patriots
---	Defensive tackle	Sam Adams	To Denver Broncos
Released	Linebacker	A. J. Nicholson	
Signed	Defensive tackle	Michael Myers	From Denver Broncos
Signed	Linebacker	Edgerton Hartwell	From Atlanta Falcons
Signed	Cornerback	Blue Adams	From Tampa Bay Buccaneers

=== NFL draft ===
2007 Cincinnati Bengals draft
Round	Pick	Player	Position	College	Notes
1	18	Leon Hall	Cornerback	Michigan	
2	49	Kenny Irons	Running back	Auburn	
4	114	Marvin White	Safety	TCU	
5	151	Jeff Rowe	Quarterback	Nevada	
6	187	Matt Toeaina	Defensive tackle	Oregon	
7	230	Dan Santucci	Guard	Notre Dame	
7	253	Chinedum Ndukwe	Safety	Notre Dame	compensatory selection
Made roster

=== Suspensions ===
Chris Henry, after repeated off-field run-ins with the law, was suspended for 8 games (half the regular season) after a private meeting with NFL Commissioner Roger Goodell. Chris Henry was arrested for driving without a license and a seatbelt, which led to the meeting with Goodell and his subsequent suspension for 8 games. In May, it was reported he failed a drug test as part of his parole agreement but shortly after the announcement was made it was recanted by the Kentucky police department.

Odell Thurman, another NFL player currently under contract with the Bengals has had legal troubles and still appears to be in trouble with the Bengals as well. Head coach Marvin Lewis repeatedly avoided or refused to speak about his status with the team after Thurman was suspended for all of 2006. When Thurman applied for reinstatement in July 2007 he was denied and was further suspended the entire 2007–08 season. The exact reason for the extension was not specified by the league but many suspect it had to do with a drunk-driving incident earlier that same month. His suspension prompted Hamilton County Municipal Court Judge John Burlew to call the NFL officials "Hypocrites" for promoting alcohol sales and consumption during games but punishing players for drinking.

=== Off-field incidents ===
Levi Jones was involved in an altercation with linebacker Joey Porter of the Miami Dolphins. Allegedly Porter and some others ambushed Levi, physically assaulted and robbed him. Porter was charged with a misdemeanor for assault. Jones characterized the incident as a "cowardly assault".

AJ Nicholson was arrested for the second time in as many years but for domestic violence. His wife dropped the charges but due to statutory state laws the state continued to press charges. On the day his arrest was announced he was released a few hours later by the Bengals.

=== Important injuries ===
David Pollack, injured last season with a broken neck vertebrae spent the season in rehab with hopes of returning in the 2008–09 season. Pollack later announced his retirement from the NFL.

Kenny Irons, the 2nd round draft pick, experienced a serious knee injury during a preseason game against the Detroit Lions, which forced him onto injured reserve for his rookie year.

Chris Perry experienced another injury which threatens to keep him out the entire season. In August, he was placed on the physically unable to perform list, meaning he had to miss at least six games. In November, Bengals announced that he would remain on the list for the rest of the season.

Eric Henderson fractured his wrist during the preseason against the New Orleans Saints and was put on injured reserve for the rest of the season.

== Preseason games ==
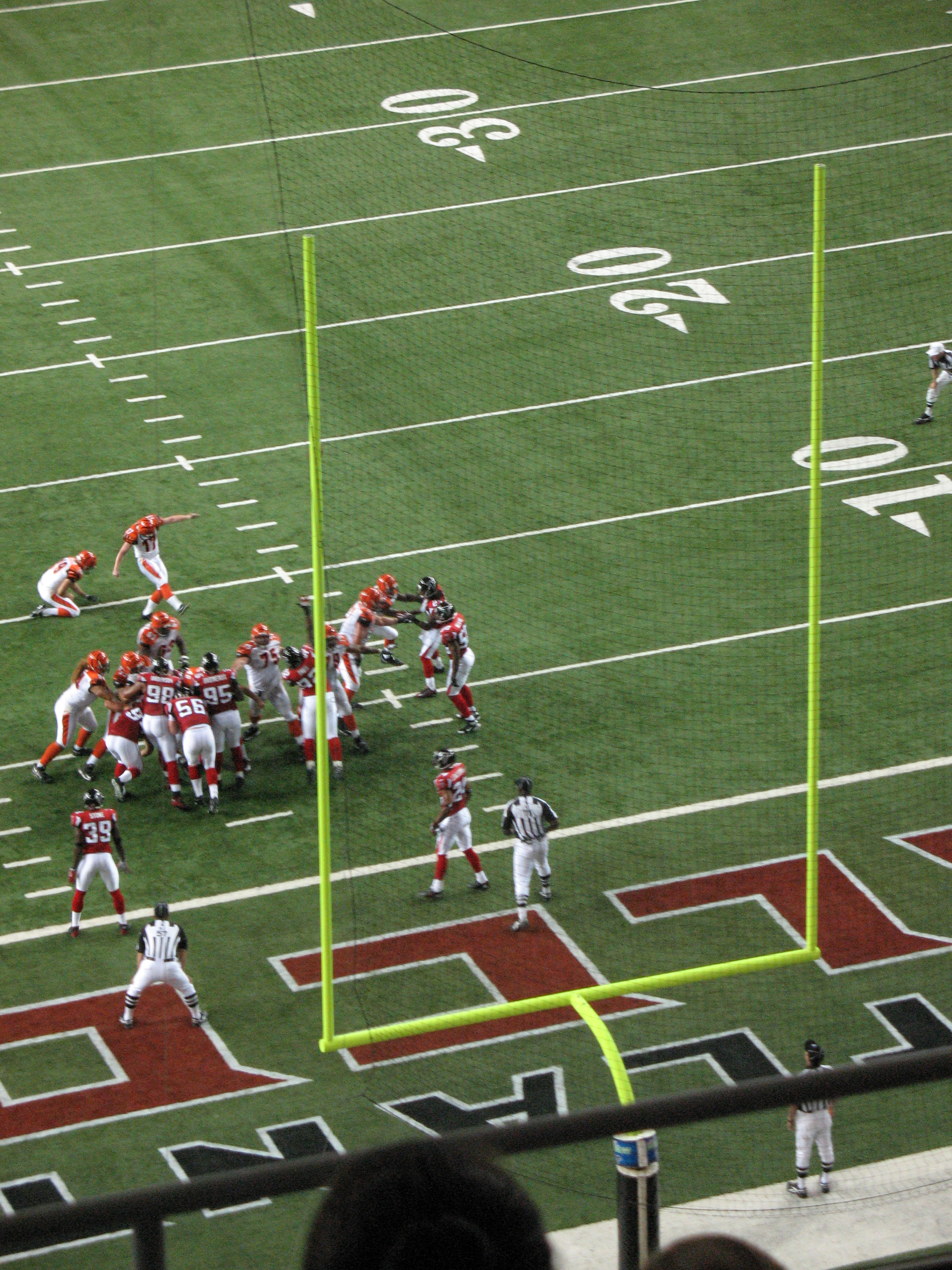
Shayne Graham kicks an extra point against the Atlanta Falcons in preseason, August 27, 2007

In the previous preseason the Bengals went 4–0. The Bengals 2007 preseason run ended at 1–3, with its final victory the game against Indianapolis in which neither Carson Palmer nor Peyton Manning came prepared to play.

The preseason started off with a loss to the Detroit Lions at their dome. The big focus was the limited showdown and relationship between Palmer and his former mentor Jon Kitna. The Bengals' starting team did not score a touchdown in their possessions, walking away with 2 Shayne Graham field goals and a huge time of possession advantage before they were benched. The Lions' starters did not score a TD during their possessions during that same time. In this game the second-round draft pick, Kenny Irons, experienced his season-ending injury. Detroit went on to win the game.

The second game was against the New Orleans Saints. Again, the starting Bengals offense failed to score a TD and settled for several Shane Graham field goals. LB Henderson suffered a season-ending wrist injury late in the game.

The third game was at the home of the Atlanta Falcons on a Monday night. The starting Bengals played until the 3rd quarter and scored two touchdowns to end their drought. Shayne Graham was injured on a kickoff during an attempted tackle and did not return to kick any PATs or kickoffs, which meant the Bengals made a conversion attempt on 4th down and attempted a 2-point try. Atlanta's starting team, led by Joey Harrington since Vick's legal troubles will keep him from the team, also managed two touchdowns. The Bengals went on to lose the game.

Their fourth and final game, also their only preseason win, took place on August 31. Neither starting quarterback came prepared to play; though Palmer at least wore his uniform, while Manning dressed up in a Colts polo. Cincinnati scored 14 points in the 3rd quarter, with no score coming from the orange jerseys before or after that quarter. Indianapolis scored 6 in the 4th quarter, falling 8 points short of victory.

== Personnel ==
2007 Cincinnati Bengals staff
Front office: President – Mike Brown; Executive vice president – Katie Blackburn; Vice president – John Sawyer; Vice president – Troy Blackburn; Senior vice president of player personnel – Pete Brown; Vice president of player personnel – Paul H. Brown; Director of football operations – Jim Lippincott; Director of player personnel – Duke Tobin; Scouting consultants – John Cooper, Bill Tobin; Head coaches: Head coach – Marvin Lewis; Assistant head coach/offensive line – Paul Alexander; Offensive coaches: Offensive coordinator – Bob Bratkowski; Quarterbacks – Ken Zampese; Running backs – Jim Anderson; Wide receivers – Mike Sheppard; Tight ends – Jonathan Hayes; Assistant offensive line – Bob Surace	Defensive coaches: Defensive coordinator – Chuck Bresnahan; Defensive line – Jay Hayes; Linebackers – Ricky Hunley; Defensive backs – Kevin Coyle; Assistant defensive backs – Louie Cioffi; Special teams coaches: Special teams – Darrin Simmons; Assistant special teams/assistant linebackers – Paul Guenther; Strength and conditioning: Strength and conditioning – Chip Morton; Assistant strength and conditioning – Ray Oliver

== Roster ==
2007 Cincinnati Bengals roster
Quarterbacks (QB): 11 Ryan Fitzpatrick; 9 Carson Palmer; 3 Jeff Rowe; Running backs (RB): 31 Jeremi Johnson FB; 32 Rudi Johnson; 33 Kenny Watson; 35 Quincy Wilson; Wide receivers (WR): 83 Antonio Chatman PR; 15 Chris Henry; 16 Glenn Holt KR; 84 T. J. Houshmandzadeh; 85 Chad Johnson; 10 Marcus Maxwell; Tight ends (TE): 86 Daniel Coats; 82 Reggie Kelly; 80 Nate Lawrie	Offensive linemen (OL): 71 Willie Anderson T; 79 Stacy Andrews G/T; 76 Levi Jones T; 75 Scott Kooistra G/T; 62 Nate Livings G; 65 Dan Santucci C; 69 Alex Stepanovich C; 74 Dane Uperesa G/T; 77 Andrew Whitworth G/T; 63 Bobbie Williams G; Defensive linemen (DL): 68 Jonathan Fanene DE; 91 Robert Geathers DE; 96 Michael Myers DT; 94 Domata Peko DT; 98 Bryan Robinson DE/DT; 92 Frostee Rucker DE; 90 Justin Smith DE; 97 John Thornton DT	Linebackers (LB): 93 Rashad Jeanty OLB; 59 Landon Johnson; 57 Dhani Jones OLB; 95 Roy Manning OLB; 50 Jim Maxwell OLB; 51 Corey Mays OLB; 56 Anthony Schlegel MLB; Defensive backs (DB): 46 Blue Adams CB; 36 John Busing FS; 29 Leon Hall CB; 28 Dexter Jackson SS; 20 David Jones CB; 22 Johnathan Joseph CB; 41 Chinedum Ndukwe SS; 24 Deltha O'Neal CB; 26 Marvin White FS; Special teams (ST): 17 Shayne Graham K; 19 Kyle Larson P; 48 Brad St. Louis LS	Practice squad: 66 Titus Adams DT; 81 Bennie Brazell WR (IR); 64 Kyle Cook C/G; 87 Tim Day TE (IR); 18 Skyler Green WR; 37 Chris Manderino FB; 25 Nick Turnbull S; 89 Cooper Wallace TE; Reserve: 55 Ahmad Brooks LB (IR); 42 Dan Burks RB (IR); 27 DeDe Dorsey RB (IR); 7 Aaron Elling K (IR); 53 Eric Ghiaciuc C (IR); 78 Eric Henderson DE (IR); 30 Kenny Irons RB (IR); 44 Herana-Daze Jones S (IR); 70 Adam Kieft T (IR); 43 Ethan Kilmer S (IR); 52 Lemar Marshall LB (IR); 58 Caleb Miller LB (IR); 23 Chris Perry RB (PUP); 88 Tab Perry WR (IR); 99 David Pollack LB (PUP); -- Odell Thurman LB (Susp.); 21 Brandon Williams CB (IR); 40 Madieu Williams S (IR); Rookies in italics 52 active, 20 reserve, 6 practice squad

== Preseason ==
Week	Date	Opponent	Result	Record	Game site	NFL.com recap
1	August 9	at Detroit Lions	L 26–27	0–1	Ford Field	Recap
2	August 18	New Orleans Saints	L 19–27	0–2	Paul Brown Stadium	Recap
3	August 27	at Atlanta Falcons	L 19–24	0–3	Georgia Dome	Recap
4	August 31	Indianapolis Colts	W 14–6	1–3	Paul Brown Stadium	Recap

== Regular season ==
=== Schedule ===
Week	Date	Opponent	Result	Record	Game site	NFL.com recap
1	September 10	**Baltimore Ravens**	**W** 27–20	1–0	Paul Brown Stadium	Recap
2	September 16	at **Cleveland Browns**	**L** 45–51	1–1	Cleveland Browns Stadium	Recap
3	September 23	at Seattle Seahawks	**L** 21–24	1–2	Qwest Field	Recap
4	October 1	New England Patriots	**L** 13–34	1–3	Paul Brown Stadium	Recap
5	Bye					
6	October 14	at Kansas City Chiefs	**L** 20–27	1–4	Arrowhead Stadium	Recap
7	October 21	New York Jets	**W** 38–31	2–4	Paul Brown Stadium	Recap
8	October 28	**Pittsburgh Steelers**	**L** 13–24	2–5	Paul Brown Stadium	Recap
9	November 4	at Buffalo Bills	**L** 21–33	2–6	Ralph Wilson Stadium	Recap
10	November 11	at **Baltimore Ravens**	**W** 21–7	3–6	M&T Bank Stadium	Recap
11	November 18	Arizona Cardinals	**L** 27–35	3–7	Paul Brown Stadium	Recap
12	November 25	Tennessee Titans	**W** 35–6	4–7	Paul Brown Stadium	Recap
13	December 2	at **Pittsburgh Steelers**	**L** 10–24	4–8	Heinz Field	Recap
14	December 9	St. Louis Rams	**W** 19–10	5–8	Paul Brown Stadium	Recap
15	December 15	at San Francisco 49ers	**L** 13–20	5–9	Monster Park	Recap
16	December 23	**Cleveland Browns**	**W** 19–14	6–9	Paul Brown Stadium	Recap
17	December 30	at Miami Dolphins	**W** 38–25	7–9	Dolphin Stadium	Recap

Note: Intra-divisional opponents are in bold text

=== Standings ===
AFC North
	W	L	T	PCT	DIV	CONF	PF	PA	STK
^{(4)} Pittsburgh Steelers	10	6	0	.625	5–1	7–5	393	269	L1
Cleveland Browns	10	6	0	.625	3–3	7–5	402	382	W1
Cincinnati Bengals	7	9	0	.438	3–3	6–6	380	385	W2
Baltimore Ravens	5	11	0	.313	1–5	2–10	275	384	W1

=== Week 1: vs. Baltimore Ravens ===
Quarter	1	2	3	4	Total
Ravens	0	10	0	10	**20**
**Bengals**	9	3	7	8	**27**

at Paul Brown Stadium, Cincinnati

- Game time: 7:00 pm EDT
- Game weather: 82 °F (28 °C) (Mostly Cloudy & Slight Rain)
- Game attendance: 66,093
- Referee: Terry McAulay
- TV announcers (ESPN): Mike Tirico, Tony Kornheiser, Ron Jaworski, Michele Tafoya & Suzy Kolber

==== Game summary ====
In their very first Monday Night home opener, the Bengals and their offensive firepower began their 40th Anniversary season in Game 1 of the Monday Night Football doubleheader against the defending AFC North champion Baltimore Ravens, with last year's top defense. In the first quarter, Cincinnati managed to cash in on a Raven fumble with QB Carson Palmer completing a 39-yard TD pass to WR Chad Johnson (whose TD celebration was on the sideline, in the form of a Hall of Fame jacket.) Later, the Bengals managed to turn another fumble recovery into points as kicker Shayne Graham kicked a 23-yard field goal. In the second quarter, Baltimore finally managed to score with RB Musa Smith getting a 6-yard TD run. Cincinnati responded with Graham kicking a 40-yard field goal, while Ravens kicker Matt Stover ended the half with a 36-yard field goal.

In the third quarter, the Bengals defense struck big, as OLB Landon Johnson recovered a McNair fumble and returned the ball 34 yards for a touchdown, along with the only score of the period. In the fourth quarter, Baltimore took the lead with Stover getting a 23-yard field goal, while Safety Ed Reed returned a punt 63 yards for a touchdown. Cincinnati regained the lead by turning an interception into a score as Palmer completed a 7-yard TD pass to WR T. J. Houshmandzadeh (followed by a successful 2-point conversion by RB Rudi Johnson). After the Ravens managed to recover a Bengal fumble on Cincinnati's next drive, Baltimore had one final chance. Eventually, the Bengals held their ground and won.

The Bengals defense had a total of 6 takeaways while the offense only turned over the ball twice. The game was relatively close in score with the final chance to tie up the game coming with a bit more than one minute left on the game clock. The defense held Baltimore out successfully scoring the tying touchdown after they had "goal to go" for 8 consecutive plays (after penalties extended their opportunities). Two Bengals linemen, Willie Anderson and Levi Jones, did not play most of this game due to injuries.

With the win, Cincinnati began its season at 1–0.

==== Scoring summary ====
Q1 – CIN – 8:38 – 39-yard TD pass from Carson Palmer to Chad Johnson (kick failed) (CIN 6–0)

Q1 – CIN – 4:07 – Shayne Graham 23-yard FG (CIN 9–0)

Q2 – BAL – 11:56 – Musa Smith 6-yard TD run (Matt Stover kick) (CIN 9–7)

Q2 – CIN – 1:07 – Shayne Graham 40-yard FG (CIN 12–7)

Q2 – BAL – 0:06 – Matt Stover 36-yard FG (CIN 12–10)

Q3 – CIN – 8:57 – Landon Johnson 34-yard fumble return TD (Graham kick) (CIN 19–10)

Q4 – BAL – 14:05 – Matt Stover 23-yard FG (CIN 19–13)

Q4 – BAL – 12:25 – Ed Reed 63-yard punt return TD (Stover kick) (BAL 20–19)

Q4 – CIN – 8:53 – 7-yard TD pass from Carson Palmer to T. J. Houshmandzadeh (Rudi Johnson 2-point conversion run) (CIN 27–20)

=== Week 2: at Cleveland Browns ===
Quarter	1	2	3	4	Total
Bengals	7	14	17	7	**45**
**Browns**	6	21	14	10	**51**

at Cleveland Browns Stadium, Cleveland, Ohio

- Game time: 1:00 pm EDT
- Game weather: 59 °F (15 °C) (15.0 °C), Partly Cloudy, Wind SW 6–13 mph (21 km/h)
- Game attendance: 72,801
- Referee: Peter Morelli
- TV announcers (CBS): Bill Macatee and Steve Beuerlein

Playing in their second game of the season, the Cincinnati Bengals had a lot of things go wrong. Playing Ohio state rivals Cleveland Browns, the defense looked the exact opposite as they did in week one. Browns quarterback Derek Anderson started and threw for 328 yards and five touchdowns. It was only the third time in NFL history that two quarterbacks had thrown at least five touchdown passes in the same game. Jamal Lewis had 215 yards rushing with one touchdown and the Browns had two receivers with over 100 yards, Braylon Edwards and Kellen Winslow. The Bengals offense tried their best to keep the team in the game, however, as Carson Palmer threw for 6 TD's and Chad Johnson caught for 209 yards.

The game started out slowly in the first quarter but the second quarter saw a combined 35 points scored. It was close in the end, when the Bengals started a drive with under one minute left. They managed to get the ball to the 50-yard line when Carson Palmer was intercepted by Leigh Bodden on an intended pass for Chad Johnson. This game ended up being the eighth highest scoring game in NFL history, but not the highest scoring game between these two teams. In 2004, the Bengals beat the Browns 58–48 for the second-most combined points. The Redskins (72) and Giants (41) combined for 113 points in 1966 for the most.

==== Scoring summary ====
Q1 – CIN – 10:40 – 13-yard TD pass from Carson Palmer to Rudi Johnson (Shayne Graham kick) (CIN 7–0)

Q1 – CLE – 5:02 – Phil Dawson 39-yard FG (CIN 7–3)

Q1 – CLE – 0:09 – Phil Dawson 39-yard FG (CIN 7–6)

Q2 – CLE – 11:02 – 17-yard TD pass from Derek Anderson to Joe Jurevicius (Dawson kick) (CLE 13–7)

Q2 – CIN – 7:40 – 23-yard TD pass from Carson Palmer to T. J. Houshmandzadeh (Graham kick) (CIN 14–13)

Q2 – CLE – 6:37 – 9-yard TD pass from Derek Anderson to Joe Jurevicius (Dawson kick) (CLE 20–14)

Q2 – CIN – 3:12 – 22-yard TD pass from Carson Palmer to Chad Johnson (Graham kick) (CIN 21–20)

Q2 – CLE – 1:11 – 25-yard TD pass from Derek Anderson to Kellen Winslow (Dawson kick) (CLE 27–21)

Q3 – CIN – 12:13 – Shayne Graham 20-yard FG (CLE 27–24)

Q3 – CLE – 8:24 – 34-yard TD pass from Derek Anderson to Braylon Edwards (Dawson kick) (CLE 34–24)

Q3 – CIN – 6:18 – 14-yard TD pass from Carson Palmer to Chad Johnson (Graham kick) (CLE 34–31)

Q3 – CLE – 6:04 – Jamal Lewis 66-yard TD run (Dawson kick) (CLE 41–31)

Q3 – CIN – 0:53 – 5-yard TD pass from Carson Palmer to T. J. Houshmandzadeh (Graham kick) (CLE 41–38)

Q4 – CLE – 10:07 – 37-yard TD pass from Derek Anderson to Braylon Edwards (Dawson kick) (CLE 48–38)

Q4 – CLE – 5:47 – Phil Dawson 18-yard FG (CLE 51–38)

Q4 – CIN – 3:45 – 7-yard TD pass from Carson Palmer to Glenn Holt (Graham kick) (CLE 51–45)

=== Week 3: at Seattle Seahawks ===
Quarter	1	2	3	4	Total
Bengals	7	3	2	9	**21**
**Seahawks**	7	7	0	10	**24**

at Qwest Field, Seattle

- Game time: 4:05 pm EDT
- Game weather: 54 °F (12 °C), Cloudy, Wind: Calm
- Game attendance: 68,110
- Referee: Ed Hochuli
- TV announcers (CBS): Gus Johnson (play-by-play) and Steve Tasker (color commentator)

Following their embarrassing divisional road loss, the Bengals flew to Qwest Field for an interconference fight with the Seattle Seahawks. The Seahawks won the toss, opted to receive the ball, and then proceeded to return the opening kickoff deep into Cincinnati territory.

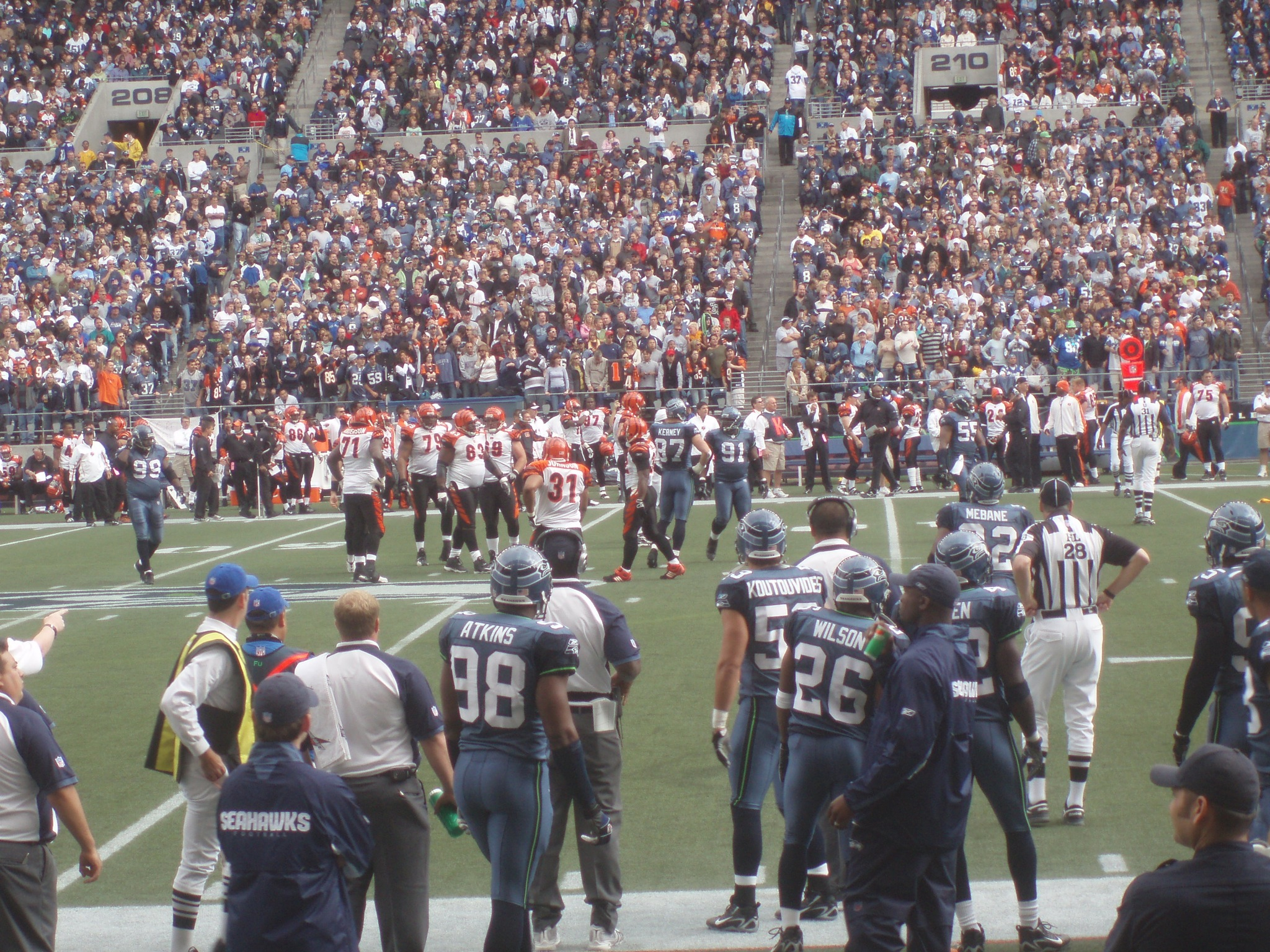
The Bengals at Seattle in week 3

Seahawk QB Matt Hasselbeck completed an 18-yard TD pass to WR Bobby Engram on that drive. Cincinnati responded with QB Carson Palmer completing a 35-yard TD pass to WR T. J. Houshmandzadeh. In the second quarter, the Bengals took the lead with kicker Shayne Graham getting a 43-yard field goal. However, Seattle took the lead with Hasselbeck completing a 42-yard TD to WR Deion Branch.

In the third quarter, Cincinnati struck back with LB Lemar Marshall sacked Hasselbeck in his own end zone for a safety, along with the only score of the period. In the fourth quarter, the Bengals took the lead with Graham getting a 24-yard field goal. The Seahawks responded with kicker Josh Brown getting a 23-yard field goal, while Cincinnati retook the lead with RB Kenny Watson getting an 8-yard TD run (with a failed 2-point conversion). However, Seattle took the lead with Hasselbeck completing a 22-yard TD pass to WR Nate Burleson. The Bengals' special teams unit tried to get Palmer and his offense decent field position, but WR Glenn Holt fumbled the return at their own 29-yard line, allowing the Seahawks to recover the ball for the win.

Watson came into the game because Rudi Johnson was injured. Leon Hall got his first NFL interception. Houshmandzadeh and Chad Johnson both gained more than 125 yards each receiving. Levi Jones saw his most extensive playing time so far in the season after an injury to Stacey Andrews forced the offensive line to be reshuffled. T

With the loss, Cincinnati fell to 1–2.

Scoring summary
Q	Team	Time	Scoring play	Score

=== Week 4: vs. New England Patriots ===
Quarter	1	2	3	4	Total
**Patriots**	10	7	7	10	**34**
Bengals	0	7	3	3	**13**

- Game time: 8:30 pm EDT
- Game weather: 72 °F (22 °C) (Clear & Mild)
- Game attendance: 66,113
- Referee: Jerome Boger
- TV announcers (ESPN): Mike Tirico, Tony Kornheiser, Ron Jaworski, Michele Tafoya & Suzy Kolber

Trying to stop a two-game skid, the Bengals went home for their second Monday Night game of the year. They wore their alternate uniforms as they played against the New England Patriots. In the first quarter, Cincinnati trailed early as Patriots kicker Stephen Gostkowski got a 31-yard field goal, while QB Tom Brady completed a 1-yard TD pass to LB Mike Vrabel. In the second quarter, the Bengals managed to get on the board with QB Carson Palmer completing a 1-yard TD pass to WR T. J. Houshmandzadeh. However, New England responded with Brady completing a 7-yard TD pass to WR Randy Moss. Near the end of the 2nd quarter, the Bengals had a chance to get closer to the Pats, but a miscommunication between Palmer and Chad Johnson resulted in a New England interception. Palmer and Johnson argued on the sidelines and all the way back to the locker room.

In the third quarter, Cincinnati continued to struggle as Patriots RB Sammy Morris getting a 7-yard TD run. The Bengals' only response was kicker Shayne Graham nailing a 40-yard field goal. In the fourth quarter, New England increased its lead with Gostkowski kicking a 36-yard field goal. Cincinnati's final response was Graham kicking a 48-yard field goal. Afterwards, the Patriots sealed the win with Brady and Moss hooking up with each other again on a 14-yard TD pass.

With their third-straight loss, the Bengals entered their bye week at 1–3. It also marked Cincinnati's 5th loss to New England in the last 6 meetings. After the game, Marvin Lewis was heard yelling at his players for their 1–3 record. He called a team meeting a few days later and said that "anyone who doesn't want to play shouldn't show up".

Scoring summary
Q	Team	Time	Scoring play	Score

=== Week 6: at Kansas City Chiefs ===
Quarter	1	2	3	4	Total
Bengals	7	0	0	13	**20**
**Chiefs**	10	10	0	7	**27**

at Arrowhead Stadium, Kansas City, Missouri

- Game time: 1:00 pm EDT
- Game weather: 68 °F (20 °C) (Partly Cloudy)
- Game attendance: 76,846
- Referee: John Parry
- TV announcers (CBS): Kevin Harlan & Rich Gannon

Coming off of their bye week with hopes to turn their season around, the Bengals flew to Arrowhead Stadium for a Week 6 duel with the Kansas City Chiefs. In the first quarter, Cincinnati trailed early as Chiefs kicker Dave Rayner kicked a 32-yard field goal. The Bengals responded with QB Carson Palmer completing a 42-yard TD pass to WR T. J. Houshmandzadeh. However, Kansas City responded with QB Damon Huard completing a 3-yard TD pass to TE Tony Gonzalez. In the second quarter, Cincinnati continued to struggle as Chiefs RB Larry Johnson got an 8-yard TD run, along with Rayner ending the half with a 20-yard field goal.

After a scoreless third quarter, the Bengals tried to make a comeback in the fourth quarter as kicker Shayne Graham got a 33-yard field goal. After Kansas City increased its lead with Huard and Gonzalez hooking up with each other again on a 26-yard TD pass, Cincinnati got within striking distance as Palmer and Houshmandzadeh hooked up with each other again on a 30-yard TD pass, along with Graham's 36-yard field goal. The Chiefs held on to get the win.

With their fourth-straight loss, the Bengals fell to 1–4. It also marked the first time in the Marvin Lewis era that Cincinnati had lost four-straight games.

Scoring summary
Q	Team	Time	Scoring play	Score

=== Week 7: vs. New York Jets ===
Quarter	1	2	3	4	Total
Jets	7	13	3	8	**31**
**Bengals**	3	7	7	21	**38**

at Paul Brown Stadium, Cincinnati

- Game time: 4:05 pm EDT
- Game weather: 77 °F (25 °C) (Sunny)
- Game attendance: 65,868
- Referee: Tony Corrente
- TV announcers (CBS): Ian Eagle (play-by-play) & Solomon Wilcots (color commentator)

Trying to snap a four-game skid, the Bengals went home for a Week 7 intraconference duel, as they hosted the New York Jets for the first time in a decade. In the first quarter, Cincinnati trailed early as Jets QB Chad Pennington completed a 57-yard TD pass to WR Laveranues Coles. The Bengals responded with kicker Shayne Graham getting a 20-yard field goal. In the second quarter, New York increased its lead with kicker Mike Nugent getting a 24-yard and a 35-yard field goal. Cincinnati responded with RB Kenny Watson getting a 3-yard TD run. The Jets ended the half with Pennington and Coles hooking up with each other again on a 36-yard field goal.

In the third quarter, New York added onto its lead with Nugent kicking a 43-yard field goal. Afterwards, the Bengals responded with QB Carson Palmer completing a 3-yard TD pass to WR T. J. Houshmandzadeh. In the fourth quarter, Cincinnati's offense took over as Watson added a 1-yard and a 2-yard TD run on to his magnificent day. Afterwards, the Bengals defense sealed the win with CB Johnathan Joseph returning an interception 42 yards for a touchdown. Afterwards, the Jets end the game with Pennington completing a 32-yard TD pass to WR Jerricho Cotchery.

With their four-game skid snapped, Cincinnati kept its playoff hopes alive by improving to 2–4.

=== Week 8: vs. Pittsburgh Steelers ===
Quarter	1	2	3	4	Total
**Steelers**	7	14	0	3	**24**
Bengals	3	3	0	7	**13**

at Paul Brown Stadium, Cincinnati, Ohio

- Game time: 1:00 pm EDT
- Game weather: 55 °F (13 °C) (sunny)
- Game attendance: 66,188
- Referee: Walt Coleman
- TV announcers (CBS): Dick Enberg (play by play) and Randy Cross (color commentator)

Coming off their home win over the Jets, the Bengals stayed at home for an AFC North clash with the Pittsburgh Steelers. In the first quarter, Cincinnati struck first with kicker Shayne Graham getting a 31-yard field goal. However, the Steelers responded with QB Ben Roethlisberger completing a 21-yard TD pass to WR Hines Ward. In the second quarter, the Bengals struggled as Roethlisberger and Ward hooked up with each other again on a 6-yard TD pass. Cincinnati answered with Graham kicking a 20-yard field goal. Pittsburgh ended the first half with RB Willie Parker getting a 1-yard TD run.

After a scoreless third quarter, the Bengals tried to come back as QB Carson Palmer completed a 9-yard TD pass to WR T. J. Houshmandzadeh in the fourth quarter. Pittsburgh sealed the win with kicker Jeff Reed nailing a 40-yard field goal.

With the loss, Cincinnati fell to 2–5.

=== Week 9: at Buffalo Bills ===
Quarter	1	2	3	4	Total
Bengals	7	7	7	0	**21**
**Bills**	7	6	3	17	**33**

at Ralph Wilson Stadium, Orchard Park, New York

- Game time: 1:00 pm. EST
- Game weather: 47 °F (8 °C) (Partly Cloudy)
- Game attendance: 70,745
- Referee: Jeff Triplette
- TV announcers (CBS): Ian Eagle (play-by-play) and Solomon Wilcots (color commentator)

Hoping to rebound from their divisional home loss to the Steelers, the Bengals flew to Ralph Wilson Stadium for a Week 9 intraconference duel with the Buffalo Bills. In the first quarter, Cincinnati trailed early as Bills QB J. P. Losman completed an 8-yard TD pass to WR Lee Evans. The Bengals answered with QB Carson Palmer completing a 15-yard TD pass to WR T. J. Houshmandzadeh. In the second quarter, Buffalo retook the lead with kicker Rian Lindell getting a 23-yard field goal. Immediately afterwards, Cincinnati took the lead as WR/KR Glenn Holt returned a kickoff 100 yards for a touchdown. The Bills ended the half with Lindell getting a 21-yard field goal.

In the third quarter, Buffalo regained the lead with Lindell kicking a 29-yard field goal. Afterwards, the Bengals went back into the lead with Palmer completing a 1-yard TD pass to FB Jeremi Johnson. Cincinnati's struggles continued, with Lindell nailing a 38-yard field goal, along with RB Marshawn Lynch completing an 8-yard TD pass to TE Robert Royal & getting a 56-yard TD run.

With the loss, the Bengals fell to 2–6.

=== Week 10: at Baltimore Ravens ===
Quarter	1	2	3	4	Total
**Bengals**	0	6	3	12	**21**
Ravens	0	0	0	7	**7**

at M&T Bank Stadium, Baltimore, Maryland

- Game time: 4:05 pm. EST
- Game weather: 50 °F (10 °C) (Clear)
- Game attendance: 71,130
- Referee: Jerome Boger
- TV announcers (CBS): Dick Enberg (play-by-play) & Randy Cross (color commentator)

Trying to snap a two-game losing skid, the Bengals flew to M&T Bank Stadium for an AFC North rematch with the Baltimore Ravens. After a scoreless first quarter, Cincinnati drew first blood in the second quarter as kicker Shayne Graham managed to get a 34-yard and a 19-yard field goal. Ravens quarterback Steve McNair continued to struggle, with an interception and several fumbles. In the third quarter, the Bengals increased its lead with Graham kicking a 22-yard field goal. In the fourth quarter, Cincinnati pulled away with Graham nailed two 35-yarders, a 21-yarder, and a 33-yard field goal. The Ravens managed to avoid a shutout loss with RB Willis McGahee getting a 1-yard TD run.

With their season-sweep over Baltimore, the Bengals improved to 3–6.

Shayne Graham's seven field goals set a franchise record.

=== Week 11: vs. Arizona Cardinals ===
Quarter	1	2	3	4	Total
**Cardinals**	7	14	14	0	**35**
Bengals	7	6	14	0	**27**

at Paul Brown Stadium, Cincinnati

- Game time: 1:00 p.m. EST
- Game weather: 44 °F (7 °C) (Cloudy)
- Game attendance: 65,403
- Referee: Ron Winter
- TV announcers (Fox): Sam Rosen (play-by-play) & Tim Ryan (color commentator)

Coming off their season-sweep over the Ravens, the Bengals went home a Week 11 interconference duel with the Arizona Cardinals. In the first quarter, Cincinnati struck first with QB Carson Palmer completing a 19-yard TD pass to WR T.J. Houshmandzadeh. The Cardinals answered with CB Antrel Rolle returning an interception 55 yards for a touchdown. In the second quarter, the Bengals regained the lead with kicker Shayne Graham getting a 41-yard field goal. However, Arizona took the lead with QB Kurt Warner completing a 44-yard TD pass to WR Anquan Boldin. Cincinnati responded with Graham kicking a 38-yard field goal, but the Cardinals increased their lead with Warner completing a 5-yard TD pass to WR Larry Fitzgerald.

In the third quarter, the Bengals trailed as RB Edgerrin James gave Arizona a 3-yard TD run. Cincinnati tried to rally as Palmer completed a 37-yard TD pass to WR Chris Henry, while RB DeDe Dorsey returned a blocked punt 19 yards for a touchdown. The Cardinals sealed the win with Rolle returning an interception 54 yards for a touchdown.

With the loss, the Bengals fell to 3–7.

=== Week 12: vs. Tennessee Titans ===
Quarter	1	2	3	4	Total
Titans	0	6	0	0	**6**
**Bengals**	7	7	14	7	**35**

at Paul Brown Stadium, Cincinnati

- Game time: 1:00 p.m. EST
- Game weather: 42 °F (6 °C) (Cloudy)
- Game attendance: 65,489
- Referee: John Parry
- TV announcers (CBS): Bill Macatee (play-by-play) & Steve Beuerlein (color commentator)

Hoping to rebound from their loss to the Cardinals, the Bengals stayed at home, donned their alternate uniforms, and played a Week 12 duel with the Tennessee Titans. In the first quarter, Cincinnati pounced first with RB Rudi Johnson getting a 5-yard TD run for the only score of the period. In the second quarter, the Titans answered with kicker Rob Bironas getting a 28-yard field goal. The Bengals responded with QB Carson Palmer completing a 10-yard TD pass to WR Chad Johnson. Tennessee ended the half with Bironas nailing a 23-yard field goal.

In the third quarter, Cincinnati began to pull away as RB Kenny Watson managed to get a 6-yard TD run, while Palmer hooked up with Chad Johnson on a 2-yard TD pass. In the fourth quarter, the Bengals sealed the victory with Palmer hooking up with Chad for the third time on a 3-yard TD pass.

With the win, Cincinnati improved to 4–7.

Chad Johnson (12 receptions for 103 yards and 3 touchdowns) ended the game as the Bengals' All-Time receptions leader with 531. Also, this marked the third time in his career that he caught 3 touchdown passes in one game.

=== Week 13: at Pittsburgh Steelers ===
Quarter	1	2	3	4	Total
Bengals	7	0	3	0	**10**
**Steelers**	0	17	7	0	**24**

at Heinz Field, Pittsburgh, Pennsylvania

- Game time: 8:15 p.m. EST (Sunday Night Football)
- Game weather: 48 °F (9 °C) (Rainy)
- Game attendance: 58,842
- Referee: Bill Carollo
- TV announcers (NBC): Al Michaels (play by play), John Madden (color commentator), Andrea Kremer (sideline reporter)

Coming off their dominating home win over the Titans, the Bengals flew to Heinz Field for a Week 13 AFC North rematch with the Pittsburgh Steelers. In the first quarter, Cincinnati took the early lead as RB Rudi Johnson got a 1-yard TD run for the only score of the period. However, in the second quarter, the Steelers took the lead as QB Ben Roethlisberger got a 6-yard TD run, along with kicker Jeff Reed getting a 21-yard field goal. Pittsburgh ended the half as Roethlisberger completed a 2-yard TD pass to WR Hines Ward. In the third quarter, the Bengals tried to get back into the game as kicker Shayne Graham nailed a 24-yard TD pass, yet Pittsburgh replied with Roethlisberger and Ward hooking up with each other again on an 8-yard TD pass.

With the loss, Cincinnati fell to 4–8.

For QB Carson Palmer, one week after completing a career-best 84.2% of his passes against Tennessee, he completed a career-worst 38.6% of his passes.

=== Week 14: vs. St. Louis Rams ===
Quarter	1	2	3	4	Total
Rams	0	0	7	3	**10**
**Bengals**	7	3	6	3	**19**

at Paul Brown Stadium, Cincinnati

- Game time: 1:00 pm EDT/12:00 pm CDT
- Game weather: 38 °F (3 °C) (Light Rain)
- Game attendance: 65,143
- Referee: Larry Nemmers
- TV announcers (Fox): Pat Summerall (play-by-play) & Brian Baldinger (color commentator)

Hoping to rebound from their divisional road loss to the Steelers, the Bengals went home for a Week 14 interconference duel with the St. Louis Rams. In the first quarter, Cincinnati drew first blood as RB Rudi Johnson got a 1-yard TD run for the only score of the period. In the second quarter, the Bengals increased their lead with Kicker Shayne Graham getting a 27-yard field goal for the only score of the period.

In the third quarter, the Rams got on the board as CB Fakhir Brown returned an interception 36 yards for a touchdown. Afterwards, Cincinnati responded with Graham kicking a 38-yard and a 32-yard field goal. In the fourth quarter, St. Louis tried to come back as kicker Jeff Wilkins kicked a 50-yard field goal. Afterwards, the Bengals ended the game with Graham nailing a 46-yard field goal.

With the win, Cincinnati improved to 5–8 and outright 3rd place in the AFC North with the Ravens' loss.

=== Week 15: at San Francisco 49ers ===
Quarter	1	2	3	4	Total
Bengals	0	10	0	3	**13**
**49ers**	0	14	6	0	**20**

at Bill Walsh Field at Monster Park, San Francisco

- Game time: 8:00 pm EDT
- Game weather: 52 °F (11 °C) (Clear)
- Game attendance: 68,053
- Referee: Terry McAulay
- TV announcers (NFL Network): Bryant Gumbel (play-by-play), Marshall Faulk & Deion Sanders (color commentators)

Coming off their home win over the Rams, the Bengals flew to Bill Walsh Field at Monster Park for a Saturday night interconference duel with the San Francisco 49ers. After a scoreless first quarter, Cincinnati trailed early in the second quarter as 49ers QB Shaun Hill got a 3-yard TD run. Afterwards, the Bengals took the lead as kicker Shayne Graham managed to get a 24-yard field goal, while QB Carson Palmer completed a 52-yard TD pass to WR Chris Henry. San Francisco ended the half with Hill completing a 17-yard TD pass to TE Vernon Davis.

In the third quarter, the 49ers increased their lead with kicker Joe Nedney getting a 29-yard and a 38-yard field goal. In the fourth quarter, Cincinnati tried to respond as Graham kicked a 35-yard field goal. However, the 49ers' defense held on for the win.

With the loss, the Bengals fell to 5–9, securing Head Coach Marvin Lewis' first losing season with Cincinnati.

=== Week 16: vs. Cleveland Browns ===
Quarter	1	2	3	4	Total
Browns	0	0	7	7	**14**
**Bengals**	0	19	0	0	**19**

at Paul Brown Stadium, Cincinnati

- Game time: 1:00 pm EST/12:00 pm CST
- Game weather: 30 °F (−1 °C) (Cloudy & Windy)
- Game attendance: 66,023
- Referee: Gerry Austin
- TV announcers (CBS): Greg Gumbel (play-by-play) & Dan Dierdorf (color commentator)

Hoping to rebound from their road loss to the 49ers, the Bengals played their final home game of the year in a Week 16 AFC North rematch with the Cleveland Browns. After a scoreless first quarter, Cincinnati slashed away in the second quarter as kicker Shayne Graham nailed a 29-yard field goal and QB Carson Palmer completing a 5-yard TD pass to WR T.J. Houshmandzadeh, along with RB Kenny Watson getting a 1-yard TD run.

In the third quarter, the Browns began to fight back as QB Derek Anderson completing a 2-yard TD pass to WR Braylon Edwards for the only score of the period. In the fourth quarter, Cleveland drew closer with Anderson and Edwards hooking up with each other again on a 5-yard TD pass. Afterwards, the Bengals held on for the win.

With the win, Cincinnati improved to 6–9.

=== Week 17: at Miami Dolphins ===
Quarter	1	2	3	4	Total
**Bengals**	7	14	7	10	**38**
Dolphins	3	7	0	15	**25**

at Dolphin Stadium, Miami Gardens, Florida

- Game time: 1:00 pm. EST
- Game weather: 81 °F (27 °C)
- Game attendance: 70,461
- Referee: Walt Coleman
- TV announcers (CBS): Gus Johnson (play-by-play) and Steve Tasker (color commentator)

Coming off their home victory over the Browns, the Bengals closed out their season at Dolphin Stadium in a Week 17 intraconference duel with the Miami Dolphins. In the first quarter, Cincinnati trailed early as Dolphins kicker Jay Feely kicked a 49-yard field goal. The Bengals responded with QB Carson Palmer completing a 2-yard TD pass to WR Chad Johnson. In the second quarter, Miami took the lead with QB Cleo Lemon completing a 5-yard TD pass to WR Ted Ginn Jr., yet Cincinnati replied with Palmer and C. Johnson hooking up with each other again on a 70-yard TD pass, including a 4-yard TD pass to WR Antonio Chatman.

In the third quarter, the Bengals increased their lead with Safety Chinedum Ndukwe returning a fumble 54 yards for a touchdown, along with the only score of the period. In the fourth quarter, the Dolphins tried to come back as QB John Beck got a 2-yard TD run, yet Cincinnati pulled away with RB Kenny Watson getting a 2-yard TD run and kicker Shayne Graham nailing a 30-yard field goal. Miami ended the game with Beck completing a 22-yard TD pass to WR Derek Hagan.

With the win, the Bengals closed out their season at 7–9.

==== Scoring summary ====
Q1 – MIA – 11:16 – Jay Feely 49-yard FG (MIA 3–0)

Q1 – CIN – 3:53 – 2-yard TD pass from Carson Palmer to Chad Johnson (Shayne Graham kick) (CIN 7–3)

Q2 – MIA – 7:03 – 5-yard TD pass from Cleo Lemon to Ted Ginn (Jay Feely kick) (MIA 10–7)

Q2 – CIN – 6:27 – 70-yard TD pass from Carson Palmer to Chad Johnson (Shayne Graham kick) (CIN 14–10)

Q2 – CIN – 0:04 – 4-yard TD pass from Carson Palmer to Antonio Chatman (Shayne Graham kick) (CIN 21–10)

Q3 – CIN – 13:12 – Chinedum Ndukwe 54-yard fumble return TD (Shayne Graham kick) (CIN 28–10)

Q4 – MIA – 12:21 – John Beck 2-yard TD run (Jay Feely kick) (CIN 28–17)

Q4 – CIN – 10:03 – Kenny Watson 2-yard TD run (Shayne Graham kick) (CIN 35–17)

Q4 – CIN – 2:16 – Shayne Graham 30-yard FG (CIN 38–17)

Q4 – MIA – 0:28 – 22-yard TD pass from John Beck to Derek Hagan (2-point conversion pass from John Beck to Derek Hagan) (CIN 38–25)

== See also ==
- 2007 NFL season
