= Kenny Watson (American football) =

American football player (born 1978)

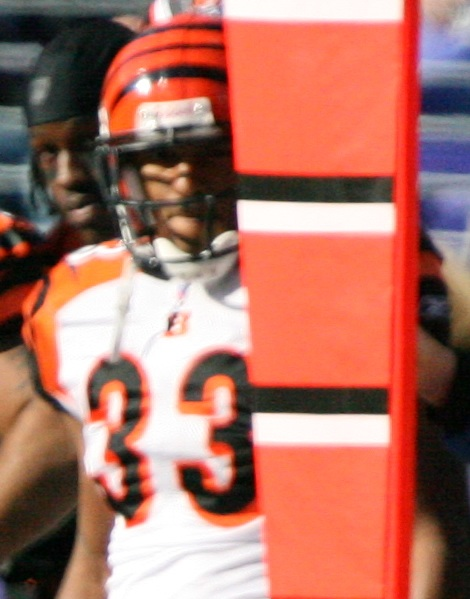
- Watson with the Cincinnati Bengals in 2006

No. 32, 33
- Position: Running back

Personal information
- Born: March 13, 1978 (age 48); Harrisburg, Pennsylvania, U.S.
- Listed height: 6 ft 0 in (1.83 m)
- Listed weight: 218 lb (99 kg)

Career information
- High school: Harrisburg
- College: Penn State
- NFL draft: 2001: undrafted

Career history
- Washington Redskins (2001–2002); Cincinnati Bengals (2003–2008)

Career NFL statistics
- Rushing yards: 1,651
- Rushing average: 4.6
- Rushing touchdowns: 9
- Receptions: 135
- Receiving yards: 1,015
- Receiving touchdowns: 2
- Stats at Pro Football Reference

Kenneth Dwight Watson (born March 13, 1978) is an American former professional football player who was a running back in the National Football League (NFL). He played college football for the Penn State Nittany Lions and was signed by the Washington Redskins as an undrafted free agent in 2001.

Watson also played for the Cincinnati Bengals.

== Early life ==
Watson attended Harrisburg High School in Harrisburg, Pennsylvania and was a letterman in football, basketball, and track. In football, he was a prep All-American and an Associated Press all-state pick in 1995. In his senior season, he ran for 1,495 yards and 23 touchdowns. After his senior football season, he participated in the 1996 Big 33 game.

== College career ==
Watson was a multi-purpose player at Penn State, playing tailback, wide receiver and kick returner. He was part of the Penn State's infamous "running back by committee" during his senior season, sharing carries with future NFLers Larry Johnson, Omar Easy, and Eric McCoo. He holds two Penn State records: career kickoff returns (67) and career kickoff yardage (1,506 yards). His record for single-season kickoff yardage (522 yards) was broken in 2007 by A. J. Wallace with 581 yards.

== Professional career ==
=== Washington Redskins ===
Watson signed with the Washington Redskins in 2001 as rookie free agent, making the active roster, but not playing in a regular season game, and ended the season on the practice squad. In 2002, he played in all 16 games for the Redskins, mostly in relief of injured Stephen Davis, finishing second on the team in rushing with 116 carries for 534 yards and a pair of touchdowns. He spent the 2003 preseason with Washington, but was released in final roster cuts on August 31.

=== Cincinnati Bengals ===
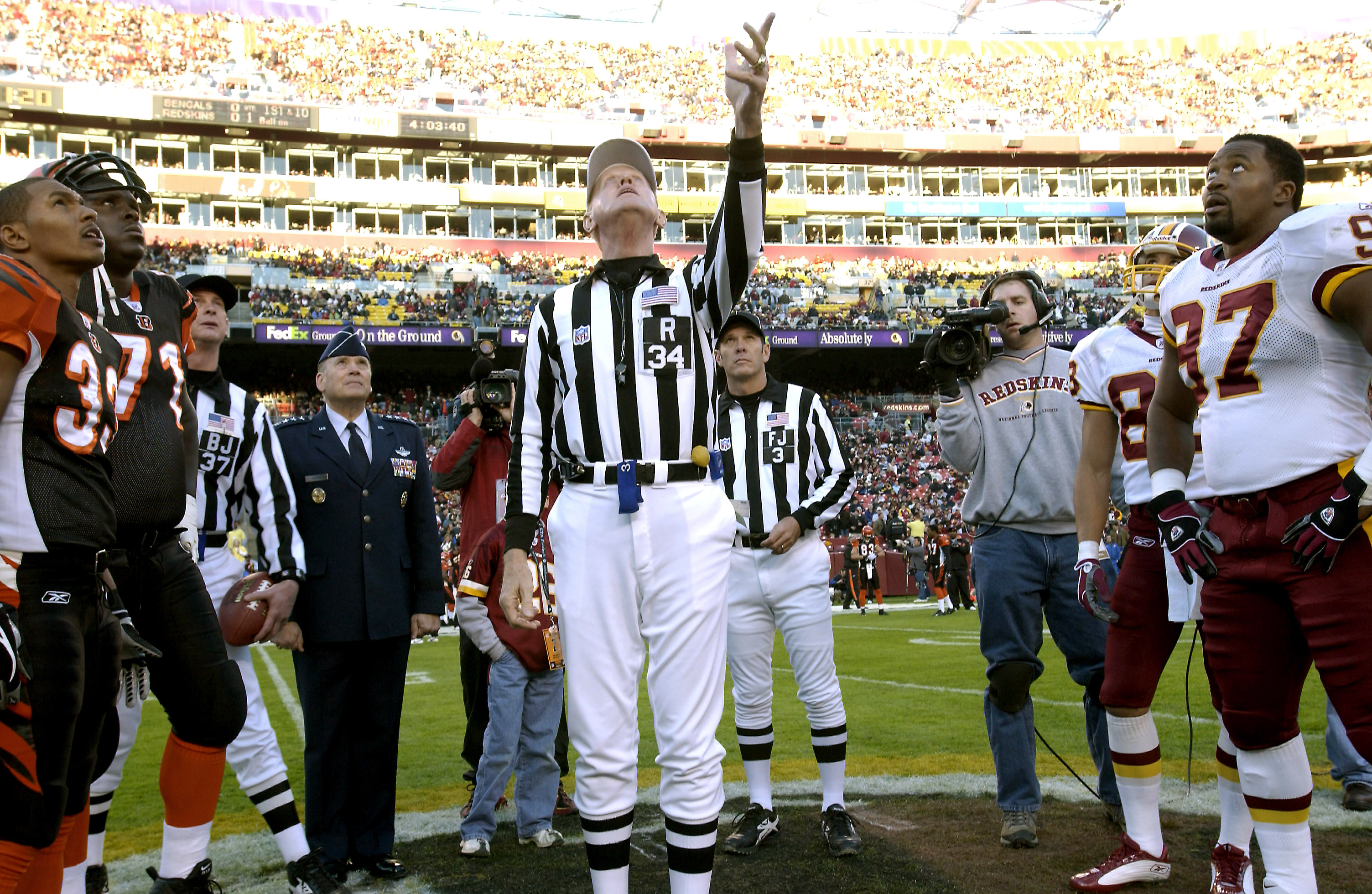
Watson (left) observes a coin toss during a 2004 game.

Watson then signed with the Cincinnati Bengals as a free agent on September 30, 2004, and played in eight games, mostly on special teams that season.

By the 2004 season, Watson had found his niche as an effective 3rd-down threat. He led Bengals running backs in receiving with 24 catches for 162 yards. His lone touchdown that season was quarterback Carson Palmer's first career touchdown pass on September 12 versus the New York Jets. Watson suffered a season-ending biceps injury in the 2005 season opener and was placed on injured reserve for the remainder of the season. He signed a one-year contract with the Bengals during the 2006 offseason and extended his contract three more years in March 2007.

Watson saw significant playing time in 2007 due to injuries to starters Rudi Johnson and Kenny Irons. Watson led the NFL in rushing, week 7 versus the New York Jets, with three touchdowns and 130 yards on 31 carries.

In 2008, Watson saw action in the Bengals' first three regular season games, rushing seven times for 32 yards and catching two passes for three yards. He was inactive during Week 4 against the Cleveland Browns. The following week, the Bengals released Watson on October 4 to make room for wide receiver Chris Henry, who was coming off suspension. He was re-signed on October 7.

Watson was released by the Bengals on August 10, 2009.

== NFL career statistics ==
Legend
**Bold**	Career high

Year	Team	Games		Rushing					Receiving				
Year	Team	GP	GS	Att	Yds	Avg	Lng	TD	Rec	Yds	Avg	Lng	TD
2002	WAS	**16**	4	116	534	4.6	24	1	32	253	7.9	**62**	**1**
2003	CIN	8	0	0	0	0.0	0	0	0	0	0.0	0	0
2004	CIN	**16**	0	26	161	**6.2**	**25**	0	25	171	6.8	21	**1**
2005	CIN	1	0	0	0	0.0	0	0	0	0	0.0	0	0
2006	CIN	**16**	0	25	138	5.5	18	1	23	213	**9.3**	46	0
2007	CIN	**16**	**5**	**178**	**763**	4.3	24	**7**	**52**	**374**	7.2	43	0
2008	CIN	10	0	13	55	4.2	7	0	3	4	1.3	3	0
		83	9	358	1,651	4.6	25	9	135	1,015	7.5	62	2
