= Iron (disambiguation) =

Iron is a chemical element with symbol Fe and atomic number 26.

Iron may also refer to:

== Equipment ==
- Iron (golf), a type of golf club
- Iron (plane), a woodworking blade
- Iron (theatre), a fire safety device
- One of several tools consisting of a heated piece of iron or other metal for the purposes of transferring heat, such as:
  - Branding iron
  - Clothes iron
  - Hair iron
  - Soldering iron
  - Waffle iron
- Tire iron

== Languages ==
- Iron Ossetian, spoken in the Caucasus
- Ivernic language, a hypothetical ancient language of Ireland

== Music ==
- Iron (Ensiferum album)
- Iron (Silent Stream of Godless Elegy album)
- "Iron" (Nicky Romero and Calvin Harris song)
- "Iron" (Within Temptation song)
- "Iron" (Woodkid song), released as a single and a remix EP

== Places ==
- Iron, Aisne, a commune in France
- Iron County (disambiguation), several US counties
- Iron Mountain (disambiguation)
- Iron River (Iron County, Michigan)
- Iron River (Marquette County, Michigan)
- Iron Township (disambiguation)
- Iron Cove, Sydney, New South Wales, Australia

== Other uses ==
- Iron (political party, 2010), a political party in South Ossetia founded by dissident Timur Tskhovrebov
- Iron (political party, 2023), a political party in South Ossetia founded by Russophile Georgiy Kabisov
- Iron (people), a subgroup of the Ossetians
- Al-Hadid ("Iron" or "The Iron"), the fifty-seventh sura of the Qur'an
- Iron (metaphor)
- A short name for iron meteorite
- SRWare Iron, a freeware web browser
- The Iron, a nickname for Scunthorpe United F.C.
- Cast iron, a group of iron-carbon alloys
- Wrought iron, an iron alloy with a very low carbon
- Pig iron, an iron alloy with high carbon content
- Slang, can refer to a firearm
- Iron, a member of the DC Comics superhero group, the Metal Men.
- Iron (rapper) (1992–2021), stage name of South Korean rapper Jung Hun-cheol.

== See also ==
- Ironing (disambiguation)
- Irons (disambiguation)
- Iron ochre
- Irone, a group of fragrant liquids, used in perfumes
- Fe (disambiguation)
- Isotopes of iron
