= Irons =

Irons may refer to:

- Irons (surname), a list of people and fictional characters
- The Irons, a nickname for West Ham United FC
- The Irons, a nickname for English heavy metal band Iron Maiden
- Leg irons, a kind of physical restraint used on the feet or ankles
- "the irons", colloquial name of a Halligan bar combined with a fire axe
- Irons, Michigan, United States, an unincorporated community
- Irons Run, Ohio, United States, a stream

== See also ==
- Iron (disambiguation)
- In irons (sailing), the term for a sailing ship stalled when heading into the wind
