= Bruce Irons =

Bruce Irons may refer to:

- Bruce Irons (engineer) (1924–1983), Canadian engineer and mathematician
- Bruce Irons (surfer) (born 1979), American surfer

== See also ==
- Irons (disambiguation)
