= Marvin White =

American football player (born 1983)

No. 26, 27, 25, 47
- Position: Safety

Personal information
- Born: December 5, 1983 (age 42); Port Barre, Louisiana, U.S.
- Listed height: 6 ft 1 in (1.85 m)
- Listed weight: 199 lb (90 kg)

Career information
- College: Kilgore College (2003-2004); TCU
- NFL draft: 2007: 4th round, 114th overall pick

Career history
- Cincinnati Bengals (2007–2008); Dallas Cowboys (2009); Detroit Lions (2009); Cincinnati Bengals (2010–2011); Calgary Stampeders (2012)

Awards and highlights
- First-team All-MW (2006)

Career NFL statistics
- Total tackles: 152
- Fumble recoveries: 1
- Pass deflections: 14
- Interceptions: 1
- Stats at Pro Football Reference

Marvin L. White (born December 5, 1983) is an American former professional football player who was a safety in the National Football League (NFL) and Canadian Football League (CFL). He was selected by the Cincinnati Bengals in the fourth round of the 2007 NFL draft. He played college football at Kilgore College from 2003–04, then played for the TCU Horned Frogs.

White also played for the Dallas Cowboys and Detroit Lions of the NFL, and the Calgary Stampeders of the CFL.

== Early life ==
White was a stand out athlete at Port Barre High, where he earned 14 total letters (4 each in football, basketball and track and 2 in baseball). As a senior in 2002, he led the Red Devils to their first-ever Louisiana Class 2A Football State Championship, and was named All-State in both football and basketball.

== College career ==
=== Kilgore College ===
White attended Kilgore College in Kilgore, Texas, where he was named a junior college All-American while leading the Rangers to a 10-2 record in 2004.

=== TCU ===
After his two years at Kilgore, White transferred to Texas Christian University in Fort Worth. As a junior in 2005, he started nine games, including the last seven of the season and was a big part of TCU's conference championship in their first year in the Mountain West Conference. After the season, White was named second-team All-MWC.

During his senior season at TCU, White led the team in both interceptions and tackles. His performance earned him first-team All-MWC honors as well as an invitation to play in the annual East-West Shrine Game.

His style of play, along with being a native of Louisiana, lead to teammates and fans nicknaming him "Gator." He is remembered for a game-time moment known as "The Great White Hit." In the fourth quarter of a home game against rival Texas Tech, White hit Texas Tech's receiver Robert Johnson so hard that his helmet came off, and Johnson was removed from the game due to injury.

The hit caused announcer Glenn Parker to describe White with the following: "he has a suddenness about him and violence in him."

He was an education major.

== Professional career ==
=== Cincinnati Bengals (first stint) ===
White was selected by the Cincinnati Bengals in the fourth round (114th overall) in the 2007 NFL draft. He started three games at free safety and made a total of 19 tackles that season. On September 5, 2009, White was released from the Bengals. The Bengals re-signed their former fourth round draft pick on August 22, 2010 after an injury to Safety Gibril Wilson in a preseason game against the Eagles.

=== Dallas Cowboys ===
White was claimed off waivers by the Dallas Cowboys on September 6, 2009. He appeared in three games and recorded two tackles before being waived to make room for running back Chauncey Washington. On October 5, the Cowboys waived Washington with the intention of re-signing White, but he was claimed off waivers by the Detroit Lions.

=== Detroit Lions ===
White was claimed off waivers by the Detroit Lions on October 5, 2009.

=== Cincinnati Bengals (second stint) ===
White was re-signed by the Bengals on August 22, 2010 after the injury of safety Gibril Wilson. He was released on August 24, 2011.

=== Calgary Stampeders ===
On March 13, 2012 White signed with the Calgary Stampeders of the Canadian Football League. He was released by Calgary in January 2013.

== NFL career statistics ==
Legend
**Bold**	Career high

Year	Team	Games		Tackles					Interceptions					Fumbles			
Year	Team	GP	GS	Cmb	Solo	Ast	Sck	TFL	Int	Yds	TD	Lng	PD	FF	FR	Yds	TD
2007	CIN	**15**	3	30	20	10	0.0	**3**	0	0	0	0	4	0	**1**	0	0
2008	CIN	12	**10**	**68**	**53**	**15**	0.0	0	**1**	0	0	0	4	0	0	0	0
2009	DAL	3	0	2	2	0	0.0	0	0	0	0	0	0	0	0	0	0
2009	DET	10	6	51	39	12	0.0	0	0	0	0	0	**6**	0	0	0	0
2010	CIN	3	0	1	1	0	0.0	0	0	0	0	0	0	0	0	0	0
Career		43	19	152	115	37	0.0	3	1	0	0	0	14	0	1	0	0
