= Senator Irons =

Senator Irons may refer to:

- Paulette Irons (born 1952), Louisiana State Senate
- Tammy Irons (born 1963), Alabama State Senate
