= Ironing (disambiguation) =

Ironing is the use of an iron to remove wrinkles from fabric.

Ironing may also refer to:

- Ironing (metalworking)
- Breast ironing
- Extreme ironing
