= Glenn Holt =

American football player (born 1984)

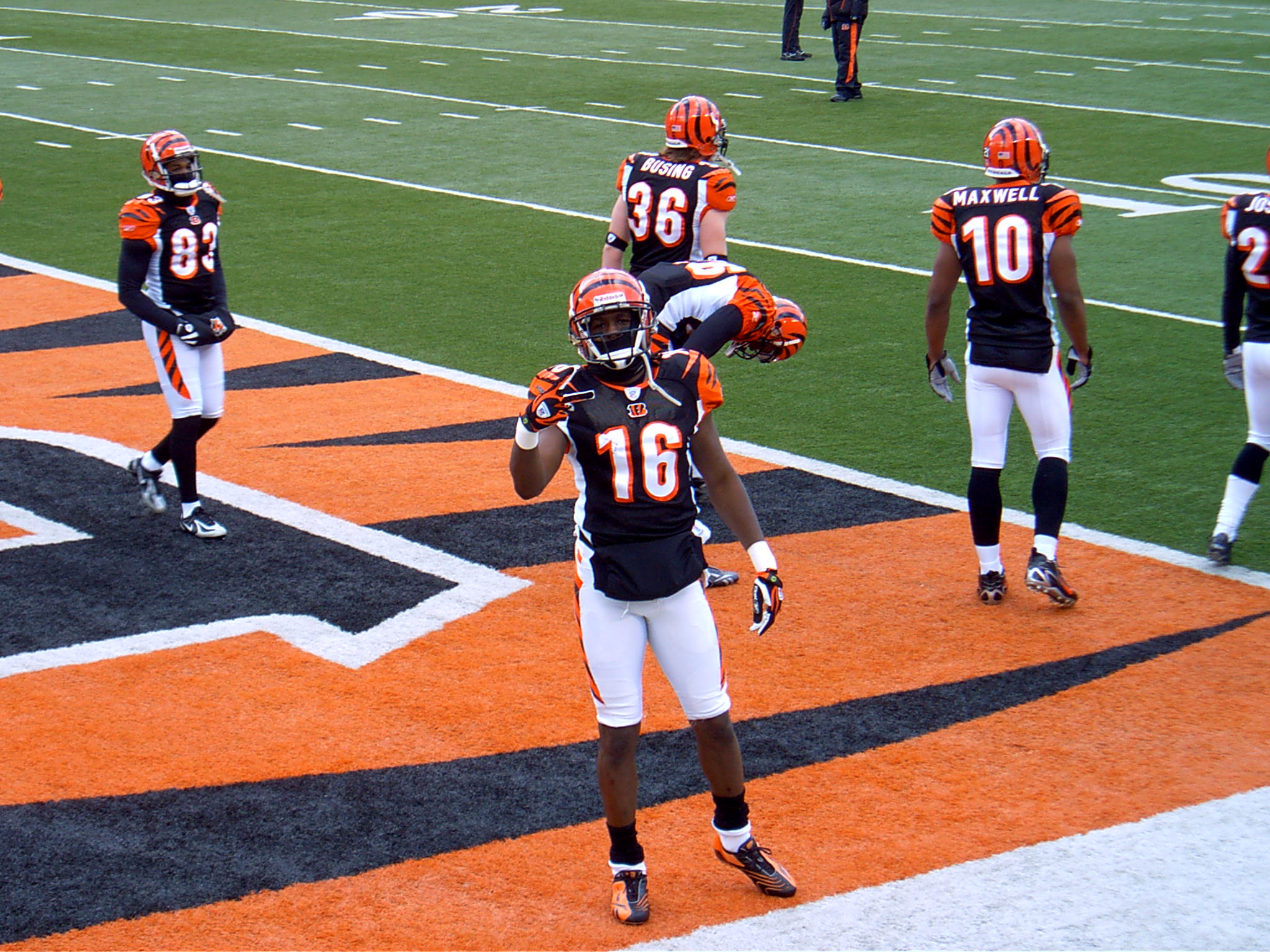
- Holt (#16) with the Bengals in 2007

No. 16, 15
- Position: Wide receiver

Personal information
- Born: July 31, 1984 (age 42); Miami, Florida, U.S.
- Listed height: 6 ft 1 in (1.85 m)
- Listed weight: 193 lb (88 kg)

Career information
- High school: North Miami (North Miami, Florida)
- College: Kentucky
- NFL draft: 2006: undrafted

Career history

Playing
- Cincinnati Bengals (2006–2008); Minnesota Vikings (2009)*; Detroit Lions (2009)*; California Redwoods (2009)
- * Offseason or practice squad member only

Coaching
- Kentucky Wildcats (2012) (GA); North Miami (FL) (2013–2014) (WR); St. Thomas Aquinas (FL) (2015–present) (WR)

Career NFL statistics
- Receptions: 20
- Receiving yards: 172
- Receiving touchdowns: 2
- Stats at Pro Football Reference

Glenn Holt Jr. (born July 31, 1984) is an American former professional football player who was a wide receiver in the National Football League (NFL). He was signed by the Cincinnati Bengals as an undrafted free agent in 2006. He played college football for the Kentucky Wildcats.

Holt was also a member of the Minnesota Vikings, Detroit Lions and California Redwoods.

== College career ==
Holt started 24 games for the Kentucky Wildcats, totaling 88 career receptions for 810 yards and six touchdowns. He also scored two rushing touchdowns. In 2004, he was named the team MVP for catching 49 passes for 415 yards with three touchdowns on the year, including the only two touchdowns in Kentucky's 14–13 comeback win over Vanderbilt. As of January 2011, Holt traded in his cleats for a clip board as he has returned to his alma mater as a Graduate Assistant Coach..

== Professional career ==
=== Cincinnati Bengals ===
Holt signed with the Cincinnati Bengals as an undrafted free agent on May 9, 2006. He then was moved to the practice squad, but finally re-signed to the team.

Holt made his NFL debut against the Carolina Panthers in 2006. His first career catch was for three yards against the Cleveland Browns, also had a kickoff return for 28 yards in that game. Against the Denver Broncos, Holt recorded a team-long 38 yard kickoff return. Against the Pittsburgh Steelers, Holt downed a Kyle Larson punt on the Pittsburgh one-yard line.

In his sophomore season of 2007, Holt played in the second game of the season against the Cleveland Browns. In that game, he recorded 5 receptions for 52 yards and a touchdown. In Week 9 against the Buffalo Bills, Holt returned a kickoff 100 yards for a touchdown in the 2nd quarter. It is the second longest kickoff return in Cincinnati Bengals history. Holt finished the season in with 16 receptions for 143 yards and a touchdown.

On March 24, 2008, the Bengals re-signed Holt who was an exclusive rights free agent to a one-year contract. A restricted free agent in the 2009 offseason, Holt was not tendered a contract offer by the Bengals.

=== Minnesota Vikings ===
Holt was signed by the Minnesota Vikings on March 18, 2009. He was waived on August 27.

=== Detroit Lions ===
Holt was claimed off waivers by the Detroit Lions on August 28, 2009. He was waived on September 2.

=== California Redwoods ===
On October 12, Holt signed with the California Redwoods of the UFL.

== Legal issues ==
In January 2020, Holt was working as Antonio Brown's trainer and was involved in an altercation with a delivery driver. Holt was arrested and charged with burglary and battery.
