= David Irons =

American football player (born 1982)

No. 30, 27
- Position: Cornerback

Personal information
- Born: October 9, 1982 (age 44); Camden, New Jersey, U.S.
- Listed height: 5 ft 11 in (1.80 m)
- Listed weight: 188 lb (85 kg)

Career information
- High school: Dacula (Dacula, Georgia)
- College: Auburn
- NFL draft: 2007: 6th round, 194th overall pick

Career history
- Atlanta Falcons (2007–2008); Florida Tuskers (2010); Sacramento Mountain Lions (2010–2012)

Awards and highlights
- 2× Second-team All-SEC (2005, 2006)

Career NFL statistics
- Total tackles: 17
- Fumble recoveries: 1
- Stats at Pro Football Reference

David Irons Jr. (born October 9, 1982) is an American former professional football player who was a cornerback in the National Football League (NFL). He played college football for the Auburn Tigers and was selected by the Atlanta Falcons in the sixth round of the 2007 NFL draft.

Irons also played for the Florida Tuskers and Sacramento Mountain Lions. He is the older brother of former NFL running back and Auburn teammate Kenny Irons.

== College career ==
=== Butler Community College ===
Irons began his college career at Butler Community College in 2001 but was unable to play that season due to a knee injury and resulting surgery. In the 2002 season, he recorded 45 tackles and two interceptions. In 2003, he helped lead the BCC Grizzlies to an NJCAA National Championship with 59 tackles, three interceptions, and nine pass breakups.

=== Auburn ===
After moving on to Auburn in 2004, David again injured his knee in pre-season practice and did not play in the Tigers' undefeated season. He was able to return and start in eleven games in 2005 and was named to the AP All-SEC Second-team with 48 tackles (36 solo, 12 assists) and 11 pass break-ups. Due to his knee injuries, Irons applied for and was granted an additional year of eligibility by the NCAA. He had already graduated with a Bachelor of Arts, but began coursework towards a master's degree in the fall semester of 2006 to maintain his eligibility. Prior to the 2006 season, David was named to the Coaches All-SEC First-team and the Jim Thorpe Award Preseason Watch List. Irons finished the regular season with 39 tackles (22 solo, 17 assists), 11 pass break-ups and two interceptions and was named to the Coaches All-SEC Second-team.

== Professional career ==
In 2008, Irons was placed on season-ending injured reserve with a knee injury. He was waived on July 28, 2009.

== Personal ==
His brother Kenny Irons, was a teammate at Auburn and was selected in the 2nd round (49th overall) of the 2007 draft by the Cincinnati Bengals. He is the nephew of Gerald Irons and Leroy Jackson and he is the cousin of Grant Irons, Jarrett Irons and Paul Irons.
