= Paul Irons =

American football player (born 1983)

Profile
- Position: Tight end

Personal information
- Born: December 23, 1983 (age 42); New Orleans, Louisiana, U.S.

Career information
- High school: St. Augustine (New Orleans)
- College: Florida State

Career history
- 2005: Cleveland Browns
- 2008–2010: Team Michigan (AAFL)*
- * Offseason or practice squad member only
- Stats at Pro Football Reference

Paul Irons (born December 23, 1983) is an American former professional football player who was a tight end for the Cleveland Browns of the National Football League (NFL). He played college football for the Florida State Seminoles. He also played professionally for Team Michigan of the All American Football League.

Irons has several current and former NFL players as cousins and uncles. These include Grant Irons, Gerald Irons, David Irons, Kenny Irons and another cousin Jarrett Irons was an All-American linebacker for the Michigan Wolverines football team.

Irons also volunteers as the Associate Director of Community Outreach for Abandon Productions.
