= Gerald Irons =

American football player (1947–2021)

No. 86
- Position: Linebacker

Personal information
- Born: May 2, 1947; Gary, Indiana, U.S.
- Died: April 1, 2021 (aged 73); The Woodlands, Texas, U.S.
- Listed height: 6 ft 2 in (1.88 m)
- Listed weight: 230 lb (104 kg)

Career information
- College: MD-Eastern Shore
- NFL draft: 1970: 3rd round, 76th overall pick

Career history
- Oakland Raiders (1970–1975); Cleveland Browns (1976–1979)

Career NFL statistics
- Interceptions: 13
- Fumble recoveries: 3
- Defensive touchdowns: 1
- Stats at Pro Football Reference

Gerald Dwayne Irons Sr. (May 2, 1947 – April 1, 2021) was an American professional football player who played ten seasons in the National Football League (NFL) with the Oakland Raiders and Cleveland Browns. He started 98 consecutive games at right linebacker for the Raiders and then the Browns from 1972 to 1978. The Raiders reached the playoffs five of Irons' six seasons with the team. He had 13 interceptions and 15 quarterback sacks during his career. He was named an "Oakland Raiders Legend" and one of the 100 Greatest Cleveland Browns.

Irons attended Maryland State College (now the University of Maryland Eastern Shore). In 1968, he was named first-team Central Intercollegiate Athletic Association at defensive end. In 1984, he was inducted into the UMES Hawks Hall of Fame. In 2013, Irons was inducted into the Indiana Football Hall of Fame.

Irons received an MBA from the University of Chicago in 1976. Irons worked in real estate development for decades and was a corporate officer of an entity operating and developing business in a planned community of 50,000 people in Texas. Irons learned Japanese as a hobby, and in 1984 the Osaka, Japan Jaycees selected him to represent the United States at its worldwide "Ten Outstanding Young Persons Conference", held for 10 days in Osaka durng 1984.

In 1990, Irons was elected to the Conroe Independent School District (CISD) Board of Trustees and later became its president, serving in that role for over two decades. During his time as board president, there were 30,000 students in the district, which had a $145 million budget. President Jimmy Carter invited Irons to the White House to discuss youth unemployment, and Irons also served as a liaison for United States Senator John Glenn of Ohio. In 2012, he became the first NFL player to have a school named in his honor; the Gerald D. Irons, Sr. Junior High School in Conroe, Texas.

Irons' youngest son Grant Irons played for the Oakland Raiders. His oldest son Gerald Jr. played for the Nebraska Cornhuskers and middle son Jarrett was the fifth junior elected captain for the Michigan Wolverines. He had several nephews and great-nephews who have played in the NFL, David Irons, Kenny Irons and Paul Irons.

== Early life ==
Irons was born on May 2, 1947, in Gary, Indiana, the youngest of seven children. Irons credited his parents with instilling a strong work ethic in him, along with imparting the importance of education in his life. He attended Gary Roosevelt High School (originally Theodore Roosevelt High School), where he met his future wife Myrna Wise, graduating in 1966. He played on Gary Roosevelt's football team four consecutive years, as well as on its basketball team. As a senior, Irons was a muscular 6 ft 2 in (1.88 m) 200 lb (90.7 kg). He was honorable mention at tackle on the Northwestern Indiana High School conference football coaches' 1965 All-Star team, selected for the Chicago Tribune.

== College career and education ==
=== Maryland State College ===
Irons received a football scholarship to attend the University of Maryland Eastern Shore (known as Maryland State College at the time), part of the Central Intercollegiate Athletic Association (CIAA). He earned his Bachelor of Science degree in business administration in 1970. He was on the dean's list in college. He played on the Hawks football team at defensive end, linebacker, offensive guard and on special teams, seldom leaving the field of play; originally playing under head coach Sandy Gilliam through his junior season (1968).

In 1966 and 1967, as a freshman and sophomore, his teammates included, among others, future Hall of Fame tackle and Oakland Raider teammate Art Shell (1970–75). Even as a freshman, he was considered a leading player on the Hawks' defense, along with Shell. As a sophomore, he was honorable mention on The Baltimore Sun's All-State Small College Football Team at middle guard on defense. As a junior, he was selected first-team All-CIAA at defensive end. In 1969, he was first-team on the Baltimore Sun's All-State College Team at linebacker.

During his time in college, he was captain of the football team, Student Government Association vice-president, a member of the Fellowship of Christian Athletes, and joined the Kappa Alpha Psi fraternity.

=== Post-graduate education ===
Irons had been accepted into the University of Chicago Graduate School of Business, at the time he was drafted to play professional football in 1970. He pursued both. While playing professional football six months a year, over six off-seasons he attended graduate school, earning a Master's Degree in Business Administration (MBA) from the University of Chicago in 1976 (while still playing in the NFL). His academic focus was on marketing, with additional concentrations in accounting and personnel management. Married and with children, during his last two years of study at the University of Chicago Irons attended night classes, while working during the day at a bank.

He also attended Cleveland Marshall College of Law at night, while playing linebacker with the Cleveland Browns for four years, completing one year of law school.

== Professional career ==
=== Oakland Raiders ===
The Oakland Raiders selected Irons in the third round of the 1970 NFL draft, 76th overall. Irons played for the Raiders from 1970 to 1975, during which time the Raiders were in the playoffs five of six seasons. He played under Hall of Fame head coach John Madden.

Irons became the team's starting right linebacker in 1972, with two interceptions and two quarterback sacks. He started every Raider game through the 1975 season. The Raiders won first place in the American Football Conference's (AFC) West Division from 1972 through 1975. Over his six-year Raider career, Irons started 56 games, with seven interceptions, nine sacks, and two fumble recoveries.

The most famous game in which he played occurred in the AFC's divisional round playoff game between the Raiders and Pittsburgh Steelers on December 23, 1972, known as the "Immaculate Reception" game. During that game, Irons made a key tackle on scrambling Steelers' quarterback Terry Bradshaw preventing a first down; and forcing the Steelers into a long field goal attempt that Steelers' kicker Roy Gerela missed.

The Raiders appeared in control of the game with less than 30 seconds to play, when the Steelers' Franco Harris caught the ball as it was floating toward the ground, which had been knocked into the air by Raiders' safety Jack Tatum after Tatum hit the intended receiver, John "Frenchy" Fuqua. Harris ran in for the game-winning touchdown, which was upheld after a long discussion by the game officials. Harris' catch and score came to be known as the immaculate reception. Irons was on the field for the Raiders' defense when this occurred.

=== Cleveland Browns ===
In April 1976, the Raiders traded Irons to the Cleveland Browns for a second round draft choice. Irons became the Browns' starting right linebacker, and started every game during his first three years in Cleveland. During those three years, he had six interceptions, 5.5 sacks, and one fumble recovery. In a December 20, 1977, game against the New York Giants, Irons returned an interception for a touchdown, the only touchdown of his career.

In 1979, Irons' last year in the NFL, he was replaced at starting right linebacker by second year player Clay Matthews Jr., who went on to a 19-year career in the NFL. Irons also was assigned to play special teams. While Irons enjoyed football, he was not embittered by taking on a reserve or diminished role. He believed that football was only a small part of life, and that it was ludicrous for a player to think the NFL could not go on without them, as all players are just "passing through". Irons made the effort to explain the change in his role to his young sons, and the boys view of their father did not change or alter their lives.

== Honors ==
In 1984, he was inducted into the UMES Hawks Hall of Fame. In 2013, Irons was inducted into the Indiana Football Hall of Fame. He was named an "Oakland Raiders Legend" and one of the 100 Greatest Cleveland Browns.

Irons is the first NFL player to have a school named in his honor; the Gerald D. Irons, Sr. Junior High School.

The Cleveland, Ohio Junior Chamber of Commerce (Jaycees) named him "Man of the Year" in 1980. In 1985, he received the Outstanding Garyite Award from the mayor of Gary, Indiana.

== Business career ==
Irons had never looked at playing football as an end, but as a means to stabilize his and his family's life. After ten years in the NFL, he retired from football and moved his family to the Houston, Texas area. He went into business, originally working with the M. W. Kellogg Company. He then worked for 32 years with, or associated with, The Woodlands Development Company.

The Woodlands, located in Texas, is a 28,000-acre master planned community originally founded by George P. Mitchell, who owned the development company. It includes residential and commercial uses. In 1992, Mitchell sold all of his interest in the development company. In 2010, the Howard Hughes Corporation purchased a majority interest in The Woodlands Development Company, and in 2011, purchased the remaining interest from Morgan Stanley Real Estate, making the development company a wholly owned subsidiary. By 2011, The Woodlands had 97,000 residents and 1,700 employers; with the development company's revenues exceeding $100 million.

Irons started with The Woodlands in the 1980s as director of office leasing and commercial/industrial land sales. By 1997, still in that role, the community had 50,000 residents. Irons eventually became the Vice President of Business Development and then Senior Vice President of Business Development. He led the relocation of hundreds of companies to The Woodlands.

In 2004, Irons left his director role at The Woodlands Development Company and was outsourced to the commercial real estate firm Binswanger, Conine and Robinson, where he became a senior vice president. Super Bowl XXXVIII was played in Houston on February 1, 2004. Irons headed a steering committee for The Woodlands that brought a number of significant Super Bowl related events, and significant income, to The Woodlands.

He later worked as vice president of business development for Colliers International.

== Public service ==
Irons learned Japanese as a hobby. Five years after arriving in Texas, in 1984, the Osaka, Japan Jaycees selected him to represent the United States at its worldwide "Ten Outstanding Young Persons Conference", held for 10 days in Osaka. During the conference, he met with the Crown Prince, Crown Princess, and Prime Minister. The Mayor of Osaka presented him with a gold key to the city of Osaka.

In 1990, Irons was elected to the Conroe Independent School District (CISD) Board of Trustees and later became its president. He won reelection and served on the CISD Board for over two decades, before resigning in June 2011. At the time he was board president, there were 30,000 students in the district, which had a $145 million budget. In 2012, a new junior high school was dedicated in Irons' name (Gerald D. Irons, Sr. Junior High School), within the Conroe Independent School District. At the time, Irons said "'This is the greatest thing ever – the most emotional feeling in my life. A lot of good things have happened to me, but this is at the top'".

President Jimmy Carter invited Irons to the White House to discuss youth unemployment. Irons served as a liaison for United States Senator John Glenn of Ohio. In 1986, Texas Governor Mark White appointed Irons to the Texas Surplus Property Agency.

Irons was a public speaker, a graduate of the Houston FBI Citizens Academy, community board member of Texas Children's Hospital and Memorial Hermann Hospital, and a national television spokesman for the United Way.

== Personal life ==
Irons was married for 50 years to Myrna (Wise) Irons. They raised three sons, Gerald Irons Jr., Jarrett Irons, and Grant Irons with considerable focus, care and attention to developing not only their sons' athletic and academic skills and abilities, but in the inculcating the qualities and character their children should have as human beings. All three became scholar-athletes and were offered both academic and athletic scholarships to attend college. The three sons graduated Conroe ISD high schools. All five members of the Irons family were selected and honored by The Woodlands residents as "Original Hometown Heroes" for their community service, at The Woodlands 25th Year Celebration.

Gerald Jr. played nose tackle at the University of Nebraska. Jarrett was an All-American football player at the University of Michigan where he was the all-time leading tackler as of 2010. He participated in the Arizona Cardinals 1997 training camp, but was cut before playing any NFL games. Grant played defensive line at the University of Notre Dame where he was twice team captain. He then played five years in the NFL, 2002 with the Buffalo Bills and 2003-2006 for the Oakland Raiders.

Irons retired after 21 years of service on the CISD School Board, and a school, Gerald D. Irons, Sr. Junior High School, was named in his honor. The school, a feeder school for Oak Ridge High School, opened in August 2012 near Conroe.

Irons was an Elder and Founding Member of Impact Church of The Woodlands.

== Death ==
Irons died of complications from Parkinson's disease, on April 1, 2021, in The Woodlands, Texas, surrounded by his family. Irons' family believed that the head traumas Irons received while playing football may have contributed to the depression, Parkinson's and Lewy body dementia from which he suffered prior to his death.
