= Grant Irons =

American football player (born 1979)

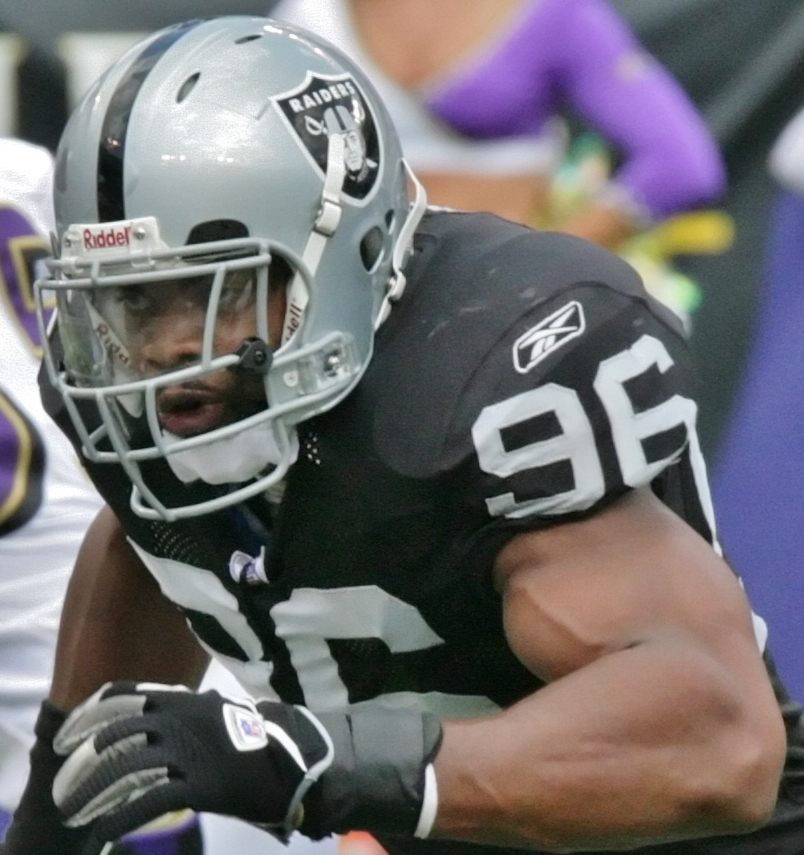
- Grant Irons in 2006.

No. 96
- Position: Defensive end / Linebacker

Personal information
- Born: July 7, 1979 (age 47); Middleburg Heights, Ohio, U.S.
- Listed height: 6 ft 6 in (1.98 m)
- Listed weight: 285 lb (129 kg)

Career information
- High school: The Woodlands (The Woodlands, Texas)
- College: Notre Dame
- NFL draft: 2002: undrafted

Career history
- Buffalo Bills (2002); Oakland Raiders (2003–2006)

Career NFL statistics
- Tackles: 33
- Sacks: 3.5
- Passes defended: 1
- Stats at Pro Football Reference

Grant Michael Irons (born July 7, 1979) is an American former professional football player who was a defensive end in the National Football League (NFL). He played college football for 43 career games with the Notre Dame Fighting Irish, making 26 starts at numerous positions on defense. He started playing for the Buffalo Bills in 2002. His father, Gerald Irons, also played for the Raiders. He is the cousin of Paul Irons, cousin once removed of Kenny Irons and David Irons and the brother of Jarrett Irons.

He was awarded the Dial Award for the national high-school scholar-athlete of the year in 1996. He was also the best teammate and cheerleader on every team he played on. He had 3.5 sacks over 5 seasons for an average of a .7 sacks per year on a 16-game season as a backup defensive end. He had one sack during his four-year career with the Oakland Raiders at back up defensive end.
