= Irons Run =

Stream in Ohio, U.S.

Coordinates: 39°27′28″N 84°11′38″W

Irons Run is a stream in the U.S. state of Ohio.

Irons Run was named in honor of a local family.
