= Jarrett Irons =

American football player

No. 37
- Position: Linebacker

Personal information
- Born: December 14, 1973 (age 52); Oakland, California
- Listed height: 6 ft 1 in (1.85 m)
- Listed weight: 230 lb (104 kg)

Career information
- High school: McCullough High School
- College: Michigan
- NFL draft: 1997: undrafted

Career history
- Arizona Cardinals (1997)*
- * Offseason or practice squad member only

Awards and highlights
- Consensus All-American (1996); 2× First-team All-Big Ten (1995, 1996); Michigan career tackles record (1996–present)

Jarrett Irons is an American former football player. A native of The Woodlands, Texas, Irons played college football as a linebacker at the University of Michigan from 1993 to 1996. He was a team co-captain of the 1995 and 1996 teams and was selected to the All-Big Ten Conference team both years. As a senior, he was selected as a consensus first-team linebacker on the 1996 College Football All-America Team. At the end of his collegiate career, Irons held Michigan's career tackles record.

== University of Michigan ==
Irons was the fifth player to be named Michigan Wolverines football captain as a junior. He was named an All-American by the Associated Press and the American Football Coaches Association in 1996. He finished his career at Michigan with 453 tackles, at that time second most in Michigan history. Irons led the team in tackles as a freshman (the second Wolverine to do so) and as a junior. As a senior, he finished second in tackles to Sam Sword and as a sophomore he finished second to Steve Morrison. In 1995, he was co-captain with Joe Marinaro. In 1996, he was co-captain with Rod Payne. The 1995 defense was third in the nation in defense against the run. Irons wore #37 for the Wolverines while redshirting in 1992 and as a varsity letterman from 1993 to 1996.

One of three times Irons had a career-high 16 tackles was during the Miracle at Michigan, against Colorado in 1994. One of those tackles was a forced fumble by Kordell Stewart that led to a touchback on a key goal line stand. The other occasions that Irons accumulated 16 tackles were as a redshirt freshman against the Wisconsin Badgers and as a fifth-year senior in his final regular season game against the Ohio State Buckeyes.

Irons was also involved in what is described as the best goal-line stand in Michigan Football history. In 1993, the Penn State Nittany Lions played its first season in the Big Ten Conference. On October 16, 1993, the Nittany Lions entered the game 5–0 (2–0 Big Ten) and ranked number seven, while Michigan was struggling at 3–2 (1–1). In the third quarter, Michigan led 14–10, but Penn State had driven to 79 yards for a first and goal from the one yard line. After consecutive quarterback sneak attempts by Kerry Collins and a third down dive attempt by Ki-Jana Carter failed, Jarrett Irons fought off fullback, Brian O'Neal and stopped Carter again on fourth down. The subsequent drive for Penn State resulted in a field goal from the eight-yard line. Michigan shut down the Lions for the rest of the game for a 21–13 victory. Irons was involved in 15 tackles that day.

Irons's 296 career tackles ranks first in school history at the University of Michigan. He was named the 1995 and 1996 winner of The Roger Zatkoff Award as the team's best linebacker.

== Professional career ==
Irons earned his bachelor's degree during his redshirt junior year in sports management and communication and began graduate study during his redshirt senior year in facility planning. After going undrafted, he signed with the Arizona Cardinals, but he was cut during training camp. He then returned to Ann Arbor, Michigan to complete his graduate study.

== Family ==
He is the older brother of Grant Irons and son of Gerald Irons both of whom are National Football League veterans. His older brother Gerald, Jr. played for the Nebraska Cornhuskers. His younger cousins once removed David Irons (Pop Warner teammate of Adam Taliaferro) and Kenny Irons are also professional football players in the NFL. From another line of younger cousins Paul Irons played in the NFL.
