= Iron Township, Iron County, Missouri =

Township in Iron County, Missouri, U.S.

Coordinates: 37.6906°N 90.7364°W

Iron Township is an inactive township in Iron County, in the U.S. state of Missouri.

Iron Township was established in 1857, and named for the iron deposits of iron within its borders.
