= Rudi Johnson =

American football player (1979–2025)

- Johnson with the Cincinnati Bengals in 2007

No. 32
- Position: Running back

Personal information
- Born: October 1, 1979; Ettrick, Virginia, U.S.
- Died: September 22, 2025 (aged 45); Miami-Dade County, Florida, U.S.
- Listed height: 5 ft 10 in (1.78 m)
- Listed weight: 225 lb (102 kg)

Career information
- High school: Thomas Dale (Chester, Virginia)
- College: Butler CC (1998–1999); Auburn (2000)
- NFL draft: 2001: 4th round, 100th overall pick

Career history
- Cincinnati Bengals (2001–2007); Detroit Lions (2008)

Awards and highlights
- Pro Bowl (2004); Second-team All-American (2000); SEC Player of the Year (2000); First-team All-SEC (2000)

Career NFL statistics
- Rushing attempts: 1,517
- Rushing yards: 5,979
- Rushing touchdowns: 49
- Receptions: 113
- Receiving yards: 676
- Receiving touchdowns: 2
- Stats at Pro Football Reference

Burudi Ali Johnson (October 1, 1979 – September 22, 2025) was an American professional football player who was a running back for eight seasons in the National Football League (NFL), primarily with the Cincinnati Bengals. He played college football for the Auburn Tigers and was selected by the Bengals in the fourth round of the 2001 NFL draft.

Johnson was selected to the Pro Bowl with the Bengals in 2004 after leading the team in rushing. He employed a bruising style of hard-nosed running that earned him the nickname the "Auburn Rambler."

== Early life ==
Johnson was born in Ettrick, Virginia, on October 1, 1979. He began playing football at the age of six with the Ettrick Trojans of the Chesterfield Quarterback League. During his high school career, he played on both offense and defense for the Thomas Dale Knights under head coach Victor Williams, following in the footsteps of Ken Oxendine and William Henderson. During his career, he broke the school's rushing record which was held by his friend, mentor and coach, Henry Jefferson.

After graduation, he enrolled at Butler Community College in El Dorado, Kansas.

== College career ==
Johnson played for two years at Butler Community College. He helped lead Butler to two national championships, defeating Ricks College in 1998 and Dixie College in 1999. His most memorable performance came against Dixie College in the championship game in which he ran for 375 yards and scored seven touchdowns. He was subsequently named NJCAA "Player of the Year". Johnson was subsequently inducted into the NJCAA Hall of Fame.

At Auburn University, Johnson finished his career with 324 rushing attempts for 1,567 yards (4.84 yards per rush average). His 324 rushing attempts was a school single-season record and his 1,567 rushing yards were the second-most in school history. He had ten games in which he rushed for 100 yards or more. He was named SEC Player of the Year and nominated for the Doak Walker Award, which was won by LaDainian Tomlinson. He was a sociology major. His fullback was Heath Evans, who would later go onto the NFL as well. NFL running back Ronnie Brown was also a teammate.

== Professional career ==
Pre-draft measurables
Height	Weight	Arm length	Hand span	40-yard dash	10-yard split	20-yard split	20-yard shuttle	Three-cone drill	Vertical jump	Broad jump	Bench press
5 ft 9 5/8 in (1.77 m)	227 lb (103 kg)	30 1/2 in (0.77 m)	9 in (0.23 m)	4.57 s	1.60 s	2.56 s	4.22 s	7.32 s	37.5 in (0.95 m)	9 ft 11 in (3.02 m)	24 reps
All values from NFL Combine

=== Cincinnati Bengals ===
The Cincinnati Bengals selected Johnson in the fourth round (100th overall) of the 2001 NFL draft.

Johnson saw little playing time in his first two NFL seasons. He backed up four-time Pro Bowler Corey Dillon, the Bengals' leading rusher since 1997, and had just 17 carries and seven receptions.

Dillon missed much of the 2003 season with injuries, and Johnson found himself in the starting lineup. In a Week 10 victory over the Houston Texans, Johnson had a career-high 43 carries for 182 rushing yards and two rushing touchdowns. In a Week 15 victory over the San Francisco 49ers, he had 21 carries for 174 rushing yards and two rushing touchdowns. Overall, he rushed for 957 yards and nine touchdowns, while adding another 146 yards on 21 receptions in just nine games.

After Dillon was traded to the New England Patriots following the 2003 season, Johnson was named the starter. He started every game in the 2004 season. In Week 12, against the Cleveland Browns, he had 26 carries for a career-high 202 rushing yards and two rushing touchdowns in the 58–48 victory. In the regular season finale against the Philadelphia Eagles, he had three rushing touchdowns in the 38–10 victory. He set a franchise rushing record with 1,454 yards. In addition, he scored 12 touchdowns and was named to the AFC Pro Bowl team.

Johnson was a major contributor in the 2005 season, in which the Bengals reached the playoffs for the first time in 15 years. Johnson remained the starter as a punishing runner providing the running game needed to complement quarterback Carson Palmer and wide receiver Chad Johnson (Ochocinco). Chris Perry, former University of Michigan running back, joined the backfield as the Bengals' first round pick in the 2004 NFL draft. In a Week 14 victory over the Cleveland Browns, he had 30 carries for 169 rushing yards and one rushing touchdown. At the end of the season, the Bengals finished with an 11–5 record, an AFC North Division title, and the team's first winning season since 1990. Johnson broke his own franchise record with 1,458 rushing yards and 12 touchdowns while also recording a career-high 23 receptions for 90 yards. Johnson scored a rushing touchdown in his playoff debut, a 31–17 loss to the Pittsburgh Steelers in the Wild Card Round.

In Week 2 of the 2006 season, Johnson had 26 carries for 145 rushing yards and two rushing touchdowns in a 34–17 victory. In the 2006 season, Johnson had 341 carries for 1,309 rushing yards and 12 rushing touchdowns in 16 games and 15 starts.

During the 2007 season, Johnson missed five games to injury, and he had only one game in which he rushed for over 100 yards, a Week 2 loss to the Cleveland Browns. He finished the season with 497 yards on 170 carries for three touchdowns.

In August 2008, it was reported that the Bengals were interested in trading Johnson for a "top receiver" to shore up their injured receiving corps, which would leave Chris Perry as the new feature back and either Kenny Watson or DeDe Dorsey as his backup. Bengals head coach Marvin Lewis denied any trade talks involving Johnson. "It's a rumor," he stated. However, on August 27, Johnson stated he expected to be gone "any minute." After a trade fell through, Johnson was released by the team on August 30 during the final roster cuts.

=== Detroit Lions ===
Johnson signed a one-year deal with the Detroit Lions on September 1, 2008. The Lions released running back Tatum Bell to make room for Johnson. The following day, Johnson accused Bell of stealing his luggage, although Bell insisted "it was just an honest mistake." In one season with the Lions, Johnson had 237 rushing yards, one rushing touchdown, 88 receiving yards, and one receiving touchdown. The 2008 season was Johnson's last in the NFL.

== Community ==
The Rudi Johnson Foundation was established in July 2005. The foundation provides assistance to families and children to promote self-sufficiency and self-reliance and incorporates several community-based programs. In 2007, James Farrior of the Pittsburgh Steelers joined the effort, establishing his own foundation to assist in this movement. The foundation helped fund the organization of the first football team for Clark Montessori High School in Cincinnati. The foundation supports Be The Match, the national registry of the National Bone Marrow Registry, and regularly organizes and conducts donor drives to recruit minorities.

== Personal life ==
Johnson was the father of five children: Jasmine Johnson, Ramiere Johnson, Indya Johnson, Brave Johnson, and Ixchel Johnson.

=== Death ===
Johnson died in Florida on September 22, 2025, at the age of 45. The investigation into his death is still ongoing, but according to the Miami-Dade Sheriff's Office, "all indications are leading to suicide", with no suspicion of foul play.

== NFL career statistics ==
Legend
**Bold**	Career high

=== Regular season ===
Year	Team	Games		Rushing					Receiving				
Year	Team	GP	GS	Att	Yds	Avg	Lng	TD	Rec	Yds	Avg	Lng	TD
2001	CIN	2	0	0	0	0.0	0	0	0	0	0.0	0	0
2002	CIN	7	0	17	67	3.9	13	0	6	34	5.7	14	0
2003	CIN	13	5	215	957	**4.5**	**54**	9	21	**146**	7.0	17	0
2004	CIN	16	16	**361**	1,454	4.0	52	**12**	15	84	5.6	30	0
2005	CIN	16	14	337	**1,458**	4.3	33	**12**	**23**	90	3.9	15	0
2006	CIN	16	15	341	1,309	3.8	22	**12**	**23**	124	5.4	18	0
2007	CIN	11	9	170	497	2.9	22	3	13	110	**8.5**	33	**1**
2008	DET	14	4	76	237	3.1	27	1	12	88	7.3	**34**	**1**
		95	63	1,517	5,979	3.9	54	49	113	676	6.0	34	2

=== Postseason ===
Year	Team	Games		Rushing					Receiving				
Year	Team	GP	GS	Att	Yds	Avg	Lng	TD	Rec	Yds	Avg	Lng	TD
2005	CIN	1	1	13	56	4.3	20	1	2	14	7.0	11	0
		1	1	13	56	4.3	20	1	2	14	7.0	11	0
