= Iron Township, St. Francois County, Missouri =

Inactive township in the US state of Missouri

Coordinates: 37.7103°N 90.5989°W

Iron Township is an inactive township in St. Francois County, in the U.S. state of Missouri.

Iron Township was erected in 1850, taking its name from Iron Mountain.
