= Kenny Irons =

American football player (born 1983)

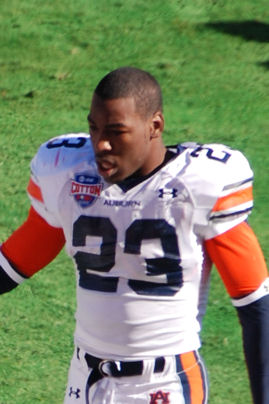
- Irons in the 2007 Cotton Bowl Classic

No. 30
- Position: Running back

Personal information
- Born: September 15, 1983 (age 43); Camden, New Jersey, U.S.
- Listed height: 5 ft 11 in (1.80 m)
- Listed weight: 201 lb (91 kg)

Career information
- College: Auburn
- NFL draft: 2007: 2nd round, 49th overall pick

Career history
- Cincinnati Bengals (2007)

Awards and highlights
- 2× First-team All-SEC (2005, 2006)

Kenny Irons (born September 15, 1983) is an American former professional football player who was a running back in the National Football League (NFL). He was selected by the Cincinnati Bengals in the second round of the 2007 NFL draft. He played college football for the Auburn Tigers.

He is the brother of former Atlanta Falcons cornerback David Irons.

== Early life ==
At Dacula High School in Dacula, Georgia, Irons rushed for 1985 yards and 19 touchdowns, playing alongside his brother David. His high school honors included PrepStar All-American, Sporting News Top 25, Atlanta Journal-Constitution's Top 11, Gwinnett County Back of the Year, and playing in the Georgia-Florida High School All-Star Game. Irons initially signed with the University of South Carolina to play for then-head coach Lou Holtz. He is the nephew of Gerald Irons and Leroy Jackson and he is the cousin of Grant Irons, Jarrett Irons, and Paul Irons.

== College career ==
=== South Carolina ===
Irons lettered as a true freshman at University of South Carolina after appearing in nine games with one start. For the season, he rushed for 201 yards on 47 carries. He also had four pass receptions for 63 yards and one touchdown on a 30-yard catch and run against Mississippi State. He rushed for a season high 43 yards on 12 attempts against Mississippi State.

=== Auburn ===
Irons transferred to Auburn University following the 2003 season in order to play alongside his brother again. Kenny participated in the Auburn A-Day Spring Game, but was ineligible to play the following year due to NCAA regulations. While sitting out the 2004 season, Irons was able to apprentice under future NFL players Cadillac Williams and Ronnie Brown.

Irons entered the 2005 season as the backup running back, but took over the starting role after Brad Lester was injured in a game against the Arkansas Razorbacks. He went on to be selected SEC Offensive Player of the Week twice. He finished the season with 1293 yards and 13 touchdowns on 256 carries. His 2005 rushing total was the 6th best in Auburn history, placing Irons behind greats like Bo Jackson, Cadillac Williams, and future Cincinnati Bengal teammate, Rudi Johnson. At season's end, Irons was a unanimous selection for both the Coaches' All-SEC First-team and the Associated Press All-SEC First-team.

Irons broke his index finger early in the 2006 season. He finished the season rushing for 198 times for a total of 941 yards and 4 touchdowns.

=== Career statistics ===
2005 season statistics
Opponent	Attempts	Yards	TDs
Ga. Tech	1	6	0
Miss. St.	13	28	0
Ball St.	11	147	2
W. Kentucky	18	111	1
S. Carolina	11	27	2
Arkansas	33	182	0
LSU	27	218	1
Ole Miss.	32	101	1
Kentucky	23	103	3
Georgia	37	179	2
Alabama	28	103	1
Wisconsin	22	88	0
Total	256	1293	13

2006 season statistics
Opponent	Attempts	Yards	TDs
Washington St.	20	183	1
Miss. St.	21	69	0
LSU	25	70	0
Buffalo	Did Not Play		
S. Carolina	27	117	2
Arkansas	15	75	0
Florida	13	67	0
Tulane	Did Not Play		
Ole Miss	23	106	0
Arkansas St.	1	0	0
Georgia	10	49	0
Alabama	19	85	1
Nebraska	24	72	0
Total	198	941	4

== Professional career ==
=== Pre-draft ===
Following the completion of his senior football season, Irons recovered from his injuries and began to work out and prepare for the 2007 NFL draft. He and his brother signed with the same agent and worked out together. They traveled together to the Senior Bowl, NFL Combine, and their individual pro days. At the combine, Irons posted a 4.45 second 40-yard dash time and a 38-inch vertical leap.

=== Cincinnati Bengals ===
Irons was selected by the Cincinnati Bengals in the second round (49th overall) of the 2007 NFL draft.

During the second quarter of the Bengals' first preseason game against the Detroit Lions on August 9, Irons tore his ACL on his fourth carry of the game, ending his rookie season. Irons was expected to recover fully and be ready for spring workouts. After the conclusion of the 2007 regular season, Irons said he expected to be ready for training camp in July 2008. However, on July 25, Irons was waived/injured by the Bengals and subsequently placed the reserve/physically-unable-to-perform list. He was waived from the PUP list on August 4.
