= Paulette Irons =

American politician (born 1952)

Paulette Riley Irons (born 1952 in New Orleans, Louisiana) is New Orleans civil district court judge for Division M. In November 1994 she became the second female member of the Louisiana Senate. She served in the chamber until the end of the statutory limit of 12 years, ending in 2006. Irons represented Louisiana Senate District 4 in New Orleans. She previously represented Louisiana House of Representatives District 95 from 1992 to 1994. Irons ran for mayor of New Orleans in 2002, finishing in third place.

== Background ==
While serving in the state senate, Irons was an active participant and leader in legislative committees including the Education, Insurance, Judiciary B, and Revenue and Fiscal Affairs Committees. She was an at-large member of the Bond Commission and Chair of the Senate Select Committee on Women and Children. Senator Irons has served on task forces including the Louisiana Women's Commission, the HIV/AIDS Commission, and the Council on Obesity Prevention and Management. Because of her belief that the rate of teenage pregnancy in Louisiana should be greatly reduced, Irons has actively worked with National Campaign to Prevent Teen Pregnancy State and Local Task Force. In 1995 she received the Alliance for Good Government's Legislator of the Year. She supported, along with Senator Don Cravins Sr., legislation to extend legal employment protection to homosexuals and lesbians. She encouraged young people to stay in school and to do their best academically.

Home Box Office (HBO) honored Irons during Black History Month in February 2004 as one of 10 notable black women leaders in the "Hearing her voice, Telling her Story" competition. In 2001, Irons received the Good Housekeeping Award for Women in Government. Family Circle Magazine featured Irons for her work to reduce the rate of teenage pregnancy.

A lifelong New Orleanian, Irons graduated from Booker T. Washington Senior High School in New Orleans, with honors. She received her bachelor's degree in business administration from Loyola University New Orleans and her juris doctor from Tulane University Law School where she pursued a concentration in public interest law. She achieved her educational success despite her impoverished background and situation as a teenage single parent. As a lawyer she has often represented defendants on the civil side and indigents charged with offenses on the criminal side. She also serves as a consulting lawyer for managers. She is a sole practitioner in the Paulette Irons Law Firm, established in 1992.

Irons has been married for many years to Alvin Irons. She is the mother of Marseah and Paul and, as of 2009, has three grandsons: Daniel, Drew, and Dillon. Her interests off the job are to be with her family.
