= 1993 Michigan Wolverines football team =

American college football season

1993 Michigan Wolverines football

Hall of Fame Bowl champion

Hall of Fame Bowl, W 42–7 vs. NC State
- Conference: Big Ten Conference

Ranking
- Coaches: No. 19
- AP: No. 21
- Record: 8–4 (5–3 Big Ten)
- Head coach: Gary Moeller (4th season)
- Defensive coordinator: Lloyd Carr (7th season)
- MVP: Buster Stanley
- Captains: Buster Stanley; Ricky Powers
- Home stadium: Michigan Stadium

1993 Big Ten Conference football standings
	Conf.					Overall
Team	W		L		T	W		L		T
No. 6 Wisconsin +	6	–	1	–	1	10	–	1	–	1
No. 11 Ohio State +	6	–	1	–	1	10	–	1	–	1
No. 8 Penn State	6	–	2	–	0	10	–	2	–	0
Indiana	5	–	3	–	0	8	–	4	–	0
No. 21 Michigan	5	–	3	–	0	8	–	4	–	0
Illinois	5	–	3	–	0	5	–	6	–	0
Michigan State	4	–	4	–	0	6	–	6	–	0
Iowa	3	–	5	–	0	6	–	6	–	0
Minnesota	3	–	5	–	0	4	–	7	–	0
Northwestern	0	–	8	–	0	2	–	9	–	0
Purdue	0	–	8	–	0	1	–	10	–	0
+ – Conference co-champions; Rankings from AP Poll

The 1993 Michigan Wolverines football team was an American football team that represented the University of Michigan in the Big Ten Conference during the 1993 NCAA Division I-A football season. In their fourth year under head coach was Gary Moeller, the Wolverines compiled an 8–4 record (5–3 in conference games), outscored opponents by a total of 300 to 153, tied for fourth place in the Big Ten, and were ranked No. 21 in the final AP Poll. Season highlights included a 21–13 victory over No. 18 Penn State, a 28–0 upset victory over No. 5 Ohio State and a 42–7 victory over NC State in the 1994 Hall of Fame Bowl.

The team's statistical leaders included quarterback Todd Collins with 2,320 passing yards, running back Tyrone Wheatley with 1,005 rushing yards and 72 points scored, and wide receiver Derrick Alexander with 35 receptions for 521 yards.

Defensive lineman Buster Stanley was selected as the team's most valuable player. Two Michigan players received first-team honors on the 1993 All-Big Ten Conference football team: Tyrone Wheatley and defensive back Ty Law.

The Wolverines played their home games at Michigan Stadium.

== Schedule ==
Date	Time	Opponent	Rank	Site	TV	Result	Attendance	Source
September 4	3:30 p.m.	Washington State*	No. 3	Michigan Stadium; Ann Arbor, MI	ABC	W 41–14	105,512	
September 11	12:00 p.m.	No. 11 Notre Dame*	No. 3	Michigan Stadium; Ann Arbor, MI (rivalry)	ABC	L 23–27	106,851	
September 25	12:30 p.m.	Houston*	No. 8	Michigan Stadium; Ann Arbor, MI		W 42–21	104,196	
October 2	12:30 p.m.	Iowa	No. 8	Michigan Stadium; Ann Arbor, MI	ESPN	W 24–7	105,423	
October 9	3:30 p.m.	at Michigan State	No. 9	Spartan Stadium; East Lansing, MI (rivalry)	ABC	L 7–17	78,311	
October 16	12:00 p.m.	at No. 7 Penn State	No. 18	Beaver Stadium; University Park, PA (rivalry)	ABC	W 21–13	96,719	
October 23	3:30 p.m.	Illinois^{†}	No. 13	Michigan Stadium; Ann Arbor, MI (rivalry)	ABC	L 21–24	106,385	
October 30	12:30 p.m.	at No. 21 Wisconsin	No. 24	Camp Randall Stadium; Madison, WI	ESPN	L 10–13	77,745	
November 6	1:00 p.m.	Purdue		Michigan Stadium; Ann Arbor, MI		W 25–10	104,326	
November 13	12:30 p.m.	at Minnesota		Hubert H. Humphrey Metrodome; Minneapolis, MN (Little Brown Jug)	ESPN	W 58–7	43,603	
November 20	12:00 p.m.	No. 5 Ohio State		Michigan Stadium; Ann Arbor, MI (The Game)	ABC	W 28–0	106,867	
January 1, 1994	11:00 a.m.	vs. NC State*	No. 23	Tampa Stadium; Tampa, FL (Hall of Fame Bowl)	ESPN	W 42–7	52,649	
*Non-conference game; ^{†}Homecoming; Rankings from AP Poll released prior to the game; All times are in Eastern time

== Game summaries ==
=== Washington State ===
Michigan, ranked #3 to open the season, jumped to a 31–0 lead before the Cougars got on the scoreboard. Touchdown runs by Ricky Powers (1 yard) and Tyrone Wheatley (59 yards) along with two Todd Collins TD passes to Mercury Hayes, staked the Wolverines to a 31–7 halftime lead. Michigan added a Collins to Amani Toomer 24-yard TD pass and a Pete Elizovic field goal in the 2nd half. Wheatley finished with 118 yards rushing and Collins completed 19 of 29 passes for 265 yards. Shonte Peoples had an interception for the Wolverine defense.

=== Notre Dame ===
No. 11 Notre Dame traveled to Ann Arbor to face the No. 3 Wolverines in an era where both Michigan and Notre Dame figured into the national title picture every year. The underdog Irish took a 27-10 third quarter lead. Late in the fourth, the Irish still led 27-16 and were poised to put the game out of reach before a goal line stand ended with fullback Marc Edwards stuffed on a 4th and goal run. Michigan proceeded to drive 99 yards for a touchdown, cutting the Notre Dame advantage to four. Notre Dame recovered the ensuing onside kick attempt and held on to win.

=== Houston ===
The #8 ranked Wolverines raced to a 28-0 first half lead before Houston knew what hit them as Michigan rolled to a 42–21 victory over the Cougars. Tyrone Wheatley scored from 25 yards and 5 yards to get the Wolverines going. Todd Collins hit Amani Toomer for a 15-yard TD strike and Ricky Powers scored 3 yards out before the Cougars finally got on the scoreboard. Wheatley added a 9-yard TD run and Tim Biakabutuka scored from 4 yards out for Michigan in the 2nd half. Wheatley finished with 171 yards rushing and Mercury Hayes led the Air Corps with 6 catches for 127 yards. Collins finished the day completing 20 of 34 passes for 267 yards. Ty Law led the Wolverine defense with 6 tackles and an interception.

=== Iowa ===
Michigan held the vaunted Hawkeye rushing game to 48 yards and the offense produced enough to beat Iowa, 24–7, in the Big Ten opener at Michigan Stadium in front of 105,000 fans. Tyrone Wheatley once again led the #8 ranked Wolverines with 113 yards rushing and scoring two touchdowns on the ground. Todd Collins was an efficient 13 of 19 for 178 yards and a TD pass to Wheatley. Jarrett Irons led the defense with 14 tackles and Shonte Peoples had an interception.

=== At Michigan State ===
The #9 ranked Wolverines traveled to East Lansing to play Michigan State and were dominated on both sides of the line of scrimmage as the Spartans pulled of a 17–7 upset and reclaimed the Paul Bunyan Trophy. The Spartan defense held Michigan to 33 yards rushing while allowing 212 yards passing. MSU had a 17–0 lead in the 3rd quarter before the Wolverines stuck on a Todd Collins 21-yard TD pass to Derrick Alexander. Alexander led the receivers with 7 catches for 99 yards. The Spartans held an almost 9 minute advantage in time-of-possession.

=== At Penn State ===
Michigan traveled to College Park to play the #7 ranked Nittany Lions before over 96,000 fans at Beaver Stadium. The Wolverines fell behind 10–0 in the 1st half, but rallied for a 21–13 victory. Derrick Alexander got the Wolverines going with a 48-yard punt return for a touchdown in the 2nd quarter to cut the lead to 10–7. Mercury Hayes caught a 16-yard TD pass from Todd Collins to give Michigan the lead, Penn State was turned away on 4th down on their attempt to retake the lead, and Collins hit Che Foster for a 5-yard TD strike in the 4th quarter to seal the Wolverine victory. Tyrone Wheatley led the way for the Wolverines with 192 yards rushing and Collins was 13 for 16 with 132 yards passing. Shonte Peoples had an interception to lead the defense.

=== Illinois ===
Johnny Johnson passed 15 yards to Jim Klein for the winning touchdown with 34 seconds left in the game as the Fighting Illini upset #13 ranked Michigan at the “Big House” in front of over 106,000 fans. Illinois took an early 7–0 lead on Johnson's 17-yard TD pass to Ken Dilger. Michigan struck back on a Todd Collins 13-yard TD pass to Derrick Alexander and a Collins to Amani Toomer 56 yard strike to give the Wolverines a 14–10 lead. Michigan stretched the lead to 21–10 on a Collins to Alexander 90-yard TD pass in the 3rd quarter, but the Illini rallied with 14 fourth quarter points, starting with a Ty Douthard 1-yard TD run. The Illini defense held Michigan to 76 yards rushing. Collins completed 14 of 23 passes for 286 yards while Alexander had 7 catches for 188 yards.

=== At Wisconsin ===
The #21 ranked Badgers shut down #24 Michigan's running game, holding them to 111 yards, while producing enough offense for a 13–10 victory at Camp Randall Stadium. Rick Schnetzky kicked two field goals and Terrell Fletcher ran for a 12-yard touchdown to provide the Badger points. Todd Collins threw a 7-yard TD pass to Derrick Alexander in the 3rd quarter to close within 13–10, but the Wolverines would get no closer. Collins was 21 for 31 and 248 yards passing, but threw two interceptions. Jarrett Irons and Shonte Peoples led the Michigan defense with 16 and 15 tackles each.

=== Purdue ===
Tim Biakabutuka ran for 140 yards and two touchdowns as Michigan managed to finally put away the Boilermakers, 25–10. The Wolverines held a tenuous 3–0 halftime lead, then put up 22 second half points to come away with the victory. Pete Elezovic kicked two field goals and Biakabutuka's 3-yard run with 23 seconds left sealed the win. Todd Collins completed 18 of 21 passes for 177 yards. The Wolverine defense held Purdue to 8 yards rushing. Jarrett Irons led the defense with 12 tackles and an interception.

=== At Minnesota ===
Michigan stormed to a 41–0 halftime lead and breezed to a 58–7 victory over the Golden Gophers at the HHH Metrodome. Tyrone Wheatley ran for 82 yards and scored 3 touchdowns while Tim Biakabutuka ran for two touchdowns to lead the Wolverine offense. Todd Collins completed 7 of 11 passes for 164 yards and a 22-yard TD pass to Walter Smith. Amani Toomer had 3 catches for 88 yards. The Wolverine defense held Minnesota to 15 yards rushing along with Ty Law having 2 interceptions and Deollo Anderson and Clarence Thompson each had 1 interception.

=== Ohio State ===
Michigan hosted #5 Ohio State at Michigan Stadium before over 106,000 fans. The Wolverines dominated and handed the Buckeyes their first loss of the season, shutting them out, 28–0. Michigan took a 21–0 halftime lead on two Todd Collins touchdown passes, one to Mercury Hayes (25 yards) and one to Che Foster (3 yards), and Jon Ritchie's 1-yard run. Michigan closed out the scoring on an Ed Davis 5-yard run. Tyrone Wheatley ran for 108 yards and Davis added 102 yards, while Collins was 14 of 20 for 140 yards. The Wolverine defense held Ohio State to 212 total yards and Ty Law had 2 interceptions, while Chuck Winters and Alfie Burch each had one interception. This was Michigan’s last victory over Ohio State as an unranked team until 2024.

Ohio State Buckeyes at Michigan Wolverines

Quarter	1	2	3	4	Total
Ohio St	0	0	0	0	0
Michigan	7	14	7	0	28

at Michigan Stadium, Ann Arbor, Michigan

- Date: November 20, 1993
- Game weather: Sunny, low 30s
- Game attendance: 106,867
- TV: ABC

Game information

First quarter

- MICH – Mercury Hayes 25-yard pass from Todd Collins (Peter Elezvoic kick), 6:34. Michigan 7–0. Drive: 5 plays, 81 yards, 2:04.

Second quarter

- MICH – Jon Ritchie 1-yard run (Peter Elezvoic kick), 5:30. Michigan 14–0. Drive: 5 plays, 99 yards, 1:24.
- MICH – Che Foster 3-yard pass from Todd Collins (Peter Elezovic kick), 2:13. Michigan 21–0. Drive: 6 plays, 31 yards, 3:06.

Third quarter

- MICH – Ed Davis 5-yard run (Peter Elezvoic kick), 10:39. Michigan 28–0. Drive: 4 plays, 32 yards, 1:05.

Top passers

- OSU – Bobby Hoying – 11/24, 134 yards, INT
- MICH – Todd Collins – 14/20, 140 yards, 2 TD, INT

Top rushers

- OSU – Raymont Harris – 14 rushes, 65 yards
- MICH – Tyrone Wheatley – 16 rushes, 105 yards

Top receivers

- OSU – Cedric Saunders – 6 receptions, 65 yards
- MICH – Derrick Alexander – 3 receptions, 64 yards

=== NC State—Hall of Fame Bowl ===
The 1994 Hall of Fame Bowl opened the New Year's Day bowl festivities with an 11 a.m. kickoff in unusually wet conditions for the Tampa, Fla., site. By the time the rain subsided and the other New Year's Day bowl games were set to begin, Michigan was well on its way to a 42–7 trouncing of North Carolina State. Tyrone Wheatley, in his third consecutive tremendous bowl outing, was named the game's MVP after compiling 124 rushing yards on 19 carries, including touchdown runs of 26 and 18 yards. Michigan opened the scoring early in the second quarter—the first points in what would become consecutive 21 point quarters. Wheatley took a pitch from Todd Collins on a sweep to the right and blazed down the sidelines for a 21-yard score. On their subsequent possession, the Wolfpack were forced to punt, and Derrick Alexander made N.C. State pay. He fielded the punt at Michigan's 21 yard line and burst up the middle of the field unchallenged for a 79-yard touchdown—the longest punt return in Hall of Fame Bowl history. The Wolverines put away the game late in the half. Closing a 13-play, 85-yard drive, Collins, on fourth and 10 from the Wolfpack 31, found Amani Toomer in the right comer of the endzone for a score. The conversion gave the Wolverines a 21–0 lead. The scoring continued for Michigan in the third quarter, as it strung together two more touchdowns---on Clarence Thompson's 43-yard interception return and Wheatley's 18 yard scoring run-before N.C. State finally broke the shutout with a touchdown of its own, Wheatley's score-his sixth bowl touchdown over the past three seasons-was the 35th rushing TD of his career, breaking Rick Leach's school record for career rushing TDs. It was also Wheatley's 40th career touchdown, tying him with Anthony Carter for the most career TDs by a Wolverine. Ricky Powers closed the game's scoring with a 16-yard TD run with 3:13 left in the third.

== Personnel ==
=== Coaching staff ===
- Head coach: Gary Moeller
- Assistant coaches: Cam Cameron, Lloyd Carr, Mike DeBord, Bill Harris, Jim Herrmann, Fred Jackson, Greg Mattison, Les Miles, Bobby Morrison
- Trainer: Paul Schmidt
- Manager: Joe Allore, Kevin Brickner, Steve Connelly, Joel Gerring, Andy Riegler, Mark Mattesi, Marty Rice, Lance Satterthwaite, Michael Weiskopf

=== Roster ===
1993 Michigan Wolverines football team roster
Players
Coaches
Offense

Pos.	#	Name	Class
WR	1	Derrick Alexander	Sr
RB	21	Tim Biakabutuka	Fr
QB	10	Todd Collins	Jr
QB	14	Brian Griese	Fr
WR	9	Mercury Hayes	So
OT	77	Trezelle Jenkins	Jr
C	52	Rod Payne	So
RB	12	Ricky Powers	Sr
OT	69	Jon Runyan	So
QB	16	Jay Riemersma	Jr
WR	18	Amani Toomer	So
RB	6	Tyrone Wheatley	Jr

Defense

Pos.	#	Name	Class
DT	90	Ninef Aghakhan	Sr
LB	37	Jarrett Irons	So
CB	22	Ty Law	So
LB	36	Steve Morrison	Sr
LB	45	Mike Vanderbeek	So

Special teams

Pos.	#	Name	Class
K	19	Remy Hamilton	Fr

Head coach

- Gary Moeller

Coordinators/assistant coaches

Legend

- (C) Team captain
- (S) Suspended
- (I) Ineligible
- Injured
- Redshirt

Roster

== Awards and honors ==
- Captain: Buster Stanley, Ricky Powers
- Academic All-American: Marc Milia (second team)
- All-Conference: Tyrone Wheatley, Buster Stanley, Ty Law
- Most Valuable Player: Buster Stanley
- Meyer Morton Award: Todd Collins
- John Maulbetsch Award: Chuck Winters
- Frederick Matthei Award: Tyrone Wheatley
- Arthur Robinson Scholarship Award: Marc Milia
- Dick Katcher Award: Buster Stanley
- Hugh Rader Jr. Award: Joe Marinaro
- Robert P. Ufer Award: Walter Smith
- Roger Zatkoff Award: Gannon Dudlar

== Statistical achievements ==
Wheatley was the repeat Big Ten scoring champion with an 8.4 points per game average in all games, although he lost the conference games title to Purdue's Mike Alstott.

The team led the Big Ten in passing efficiency for conference games (155.2), although Wisconsin won the title for all games. The team earned the fourth of four consecutive and six 1990s Big Ten rushing defense statistical championships for all games by holding opponents to 108.0 yards per game. The team also earned the third of five consecutive and six 1990s Big Ten rushing defense statistical championships for conference games by holding opponents to 103.0 yards per game. The team led the Big Ten Conference in scoring defense for conference games (11.4 points per game) and all games (13.3).

Todd Collins established the school record for single-season pass attempts (296), eclipsing Jim Harbaugh's 1986 total of 277 and broken by Brian Griese in 1997.
