= Derrick Alexander (wide receiver) =

American football player and coach (born 1971)

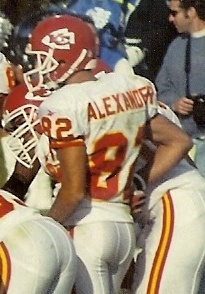
- Alexander with the Kansas City Chiefs

Personal information
- Born: November 6, 1971 (age 55); Detroit, Michigan, U.S.
- Listed height: 6 ft 2 in (1.88 m)
- Listed weight: 206 lb (93 kg)

Career information
- High school: Benedictine (Detroit)
- College: Michigan (1989–1993)
- NFL draft: 1994: 1st round, 29th overall pick

Career history

Playing
- Cleveland Browns (1994–1995); Baltimore Ravens (1996–1997); Kansas City Chiefs (1998–2001); Minnesota Vikings (2002)

Coaching
- Wilmington (2015) Wide receivers coach; Avila (2016–2018) Wide receivers coach & pass game coordinator; Morgan State (2019–2021) Wide receivers coach & pass game coordinator; Wayne State (MI) (2022) Wide receivers coach; Avila (2023–2025) Head coach

Awards and highlights
- PFWA All-Rookie Team (1994); Third-team All-American (1992); First-team All-Big Ten (1992)

Career NFL statistics
- Receptions: 417
- Receiving yards: 6,971
- Receiving touchdowns: 40
- Stats at Pro Football Reference

Head coaching record
- Career: 9–24 (.273)

Derrick Scott Alexander (born November 6, 1971) is an American college football coach and former professional player. He most recently served as the head football coach for Avila University, a position he held from 2023 to 2025. He played as a wide receiver in the National Football League (NFL).

Alexander played college football for the Michigan Wolverines from 1989 to 1993, earning first-team All-Big Ten honors in both 1992 and 1993. He was selected by the Cleveland Browns in the first round of the 1994 NFL draft and played nine seasons in the NFL with the Browns (1994–1995), Baltimore Ravens (1996–1997), Kansas City Chiefs (1998–2001), and Minnesota Vikings (2002). In 2000, he set a Chiefs single-season record with 1,391 receiving yards.

== Early life ==
Alexander was born in Detroit in 1971. He attended Benedictine High School where he competed in football, basketball, track, and baseball. In basketball, he played at the forward position, averaged 19 points per game, and received second-team All-Catholic honors in 1989. In track, he ran 4.4 in the 40-yard dash, won the Class B Michigan championship in the 200-meter, finished second in the Class B long jump, and won the Catholic League finals in the 100-meter sprint. Alexander's father, John, encouraged him to concentrate on one sport, but his mother, Marion, encouraged him to compete in multiple sports: "If he's playing sports he can't be running the streets and getting into trouble."

Alexander had his greatest success in football. At Benedictine, he played at the running back, wide receiver, and safety positions and also returned punts and kickoffs. As a senior, he tallied 877 rushing yards (13.9 yards per carry) and over 1,000 receiving yards on 40 receptions. After his senior season, he was selected by the Detroit Free Press as a first-team player on its Class B all-state team and its 1988 All-Catholic team.

In January 1989, Alexander was rated No. 2 on the Detroit Free Press "Fab 50" list of the top football prospects in the State of Michigan. His mother expressed surprise at the recruiting process: "Every college you can think of has called. I know he had a lot of athletic ability, but I guess I am surprised at how much attention he is getting. This is unbelievable to me." He signed with Michigan in February 1989.

== University of Michigan ==
=== 1989–1991 ===
Alexander enrolled at the University of Michigan in the fall of 1989. As a freshman, he caught six passes for 107 yards and one touchdown.

Prior to his sophomore season, Alexander was awarded Michigan's No. 1 jersey previously worn by the school's top receivers. Alexander responded with a strong performance, catching 31 passes for 450 yards and six touchdowns. He also returned 13 kickoffs for an average of 27.8 yards per return.

In the 1991 season opener against Boston College, Alexander was tackled by his left knee on a kickoff return and sustained a tear of his anterior cruciate ligament and ripped knee cartilage. He underwent arthroscopic surgery and missed the remainder of the 1991 season.

=== 1992 season ===
Alexander returned from the injury in 1992 as a redshirt junior. He totaled 50 receptions for 740 yards and 11 receiving touchdowns, rushed for 60 yards and a touchdown, and returned 26 punts for an average of 14.3 yards and two touchdowns. Against Minnesota on October 24, he caught seven Elvis Grbac passes for 130 yards and set a Michigan record with four touchdown catches. At the end of the season, he was selected by the Associated Press (AP) as a first-team receiver on the 1992 All-Big Ten Conference football team and a third-team player on the All-America team.

=== 1993 season ===
As a redshirt senior in 1993, he totaled 35 receptions for 621 yards and four touchdowns and returned 16 punts for an average of 10.2 yards and two touchdowns.

Against Illinois on October 23, he caught seven Todd Collins passes for 188 yards and two touchdowns. His 90-yard touchdown reception stood as the longest completion in Michigan football history until Mario Manningham surpassed it with a 97-yard reception on November 10, 2007, at Wisconsin.

In the 1994 Hall of Fame Bowl, Alexander's last game for Michigan, he returned a punt for a touchdown. It was the first kick or punt return for a touchdown in a bowl game by a Michigan player.

=== Career statistics ===
Alexander concluded his Michigan career having appeared in 44 games with 125 receptions for 1,977 yards, 22 touchdowns, and an average of 15.8 yards per reception. He returned 42 punts for 534 yards (12.7-yard average) and four touchdowns.

== Professional football ==
=== Cleveland Browns ===
Alexander was selected by the Cleveland Browns in the first round (29th overall pick) of the 1994 NFL draft. As a rookie, he led the Browns with 48 receptions for 828 yards. With Bill Belichick as head coach, Vinny Testaverde at quarterback, Alexander at wide receiver, and Leroy Hoard at running back, the 1994 Browns compiled an 11–5 record. After the season, Alexander was named to the 1994 NFL All-Rookie Team.

Following a strong rookie season, Alexander fell into disfavor with coach Belichick in 1995. One writer joked that Alexander "was so deep in Coach Bill's doghouse that he was being served Alpo at team meals." He started only two games, tallying 15 receptions for 216 yards. His lone touchdown of the season came on a 69-yard punt return against the Buffalo Bills.

=== Baltimore Ravens ===
Following the 1995 season, the Browns moved to Baltimore and became the Ravens. Under new head coach Ted Marchibroda, Alexander regained his role as a starter and tallied 62 receptions for 1,099 yards. His average of 17.7 yards per catch was sixth best in the NFL. On December 2, 1996, he caught seven passes for 198 yards (including 166 yards in the second quarter) against the Pittsburgh Steelers and was named AFC Offensive Player of the Week.

Alexander had his second consecutive 1,000-yard season in 1997. He also had the longest reception in the NFL that year—a 92-yard touchdown catch against the Seattle Seahawks on December 7.

As of 2006, he was the Ravens' all-time leader in yards-per reception (16.6). He also had the most 100-yard receiving games in Ravens history, as well as the longest pass reception.

=== Kansas City Chiefs ===
As a free agent in March 1998, Alexander signed a five-year, $17.5 million contract with the Kansas City Chiefs. At Kansas City, Alexander was reunited with his college quarterback Elvis Grbac. During the 1998 season, Alexander led the Chiefs with 992 receiving yards and averaged 18.4 yards per reception.

In 1999, started 15 games for the Chiefs and caught 54 passes for 832 yards.

Alexander had the best season of his career in 2000. Starting all 16 games, he caught 74 passes for 1,391 yards, an average of 17.8 yards per game. His 1,391 receiving yards set a Chiefs single-season record that stood until 2018.

An Achilles injury hampered Alexander's performance in 2001. He finished the season with 27 receptions for 470 yards.

=== Minnesota Vikings ===
As a free agent in 2002, Alexander signed a $5.1 million, three-year contract with the Minnesota Vikings. He tore the anterior cruciate ligament in his left knee in mid-November and underwent surgery the later that month. He missed the remainder of the season, finishing his year with 14 receptions for 134 yards and one touchdown.

Alexander was unable to run until July 2003. He attempted a comeback with the Vikings but was released on August 12, 2003.

=== Retirement ===
On July 22, 2005, he signed a one-day ceremonial contract with the Chiefs to retire as a Chief. He ended his NFL career having appeared in 126 games with 417 receptions for 6,971 yards and 40 touchdowns. He also had 210 rushing yards, one rushing touchdown and a punt return for a touchdown.

== NFL career statistics ==
Year	Team	GP	Receiving						Fumbles	
Year	Team	GP	Rec	Yds	Avg	Lng	TD	FD	Fum	Lost
1994	CLE	14	48	828	17.3	81	2	38	2	0
1995	CLE	14	15	216	14.4	40	0	9	1	0
1996	BAL	15	62	1,099	17.7	64	9	50	0	0
1997	BAL	15	65	1,009	15.5	92	9	39	1	1
1998	KC	15	54	992	18.4	65	4	40	0	0
1999	KC	16	54	832	15.4	86	2	31	0	0
2000	KC	16	78	1,391	17.8	81	10	55	0	0
2001	KC	13	27	470	17.4	46	3	22	0	0
2002	MIN	8	14	134	9.6	18	1	7	0	0
Career		126	417	6,971	16.7	92	40	291	4	1

== Coaching career ==
After his playing career, Alexander worked from 2006 to 2011 as an information technology systems analyst for the Federal Reserve Bank of Kansas City. He next worked as a systems engineer for Cerner Corporation from 2011 to 2015.

He later participated in the NFL Players Association's coaching internship program. In 2015, he coached wide receivers at Wilmington College in Ohio. He later served from 2016 to 2018 as the offensive coordinator and wide receivers coach at Avila University in Kansas City.

In March 2019, he was hired as an assistant on former teammate Tyrone Wheatley's coaching staff at Morgan State University. Alexander is the team's pass game coordinator and wide receivers coach.

Alexander was hired by Avila University to be the team's head football coach for the 2023 season.

== Head coaching record ==
Year	Team	Overall	Conference	Standing	Bowl/playoffs
Avila Eagles (Kansas Collegiate Athletic Conference) (2023–2025)
2023	Avila	4–7	4–2	3rd (Bissell)	
2024	Avila	4–7	3–2	3rd (Bissell)	
2025	Avila	1–10	1–4	T–4th (Kessinger)	
Avila:		9–24	8–8		
Total:		9–24			

== See also ==
- Lists of Michigan Wolverines football receiving leaders
