= 1994 Hall of Fame Bowl =

- 8th Hall of Fame Bowl
Michigan Wolverines	NC State Wolfpack
(7–4)	(7–4)
Big Ten	ACC
42	7
Head coach: Gary Moeller	Head coach: Mike O'Cain
AP / Coaches / BC; 23 / 22 / 23
	1	2	3	4	Total
Michigan	0	21	21	0	42
NC State	0	0	7	0	7
- Date: January 1, 1994
- Season: 1993
- Stadium: Tampa Stadium
- Location: Tampa, Florida
- MVP: Tyrone Wheatley (Michigan RB)
- Referee: Dick Burleson (SEC)
- Attendance: 52,649

United States TV coverage
- Network: ESPN
- Announcers: Ron Franklin, Mike Gottfried, Jerry Punch

The 1994 Hall of Fame Bowl featured the 23rd-ranked Michigan Wolverines, and the unranked NC State Wolfpack. It was the eighth edition of the Hall of Fame Bowl.

After a scoreless first quarter, Michigan's Tyrone Wheatley scored on a 26-yard rushing touchdown, and Michigan led 7–0. Derrick Alexander returned a punt 79 yards for a touchdown, making it 14–0. Quarterback Todd Collins threw a 31-yard touchdown pass to Amani Toomer, making the score Michigan 21, NC State 0 at halftime.

In the third quarter, Michigan returned an interception 43 yards for a touchdown to lead 28–0. Tyrone Wheatley added an 18-yard touchdown run to make it 35–0. NC State got its only touchdown on a 12-yard touchdown pass, making it 35–7. Michigan closed the scoring with a 16-yard touchdown run by Powers, making the final score 42–7.
