= 1998 Kansas City Chiefs season =

NFL team season

- Owner: Lamar Hunt
- General manager: Carl Peterson
- Head coach: Marty Schottenheimer
- Home stadium: Arrowhead Stadium

Results
- Record: 7–9
- Division place: 4th AFC West
- Playoffs: Did not qualify
- All-Pros: None
- Pro Bowlers: 1: G Will Shields

The 1998 season was the Kansas City Chiefs' 39th in the National Football League (NFL) and their 29th overall.

The season began with the team hoping to not only improve on their 13–3 campaign the previous season but to also avenge their loss in the 1998 playoffs against the eventual Super Bowl champion Denver Broncos. However, instead, the Chiefs failed to succeed in the highly competitive AFC West.

Kansas City began the season on a bright spot, with a 4–1 record and three wins against division rivals; however they then endured a 6-game losing streak, dropping their record to 4–7, and the team finished with a 7–9 record and 4th place in the AFC West. The biggest low point of the season was during a Week 11 matchup against their division rival Denver Broncos, in which the Chiefs defense were penalized five times on the same drive, including three penalties by linebacker Derrick Thomas, topping off an embarrassing 30–7 loss.

This was the first losing season of head coach Marty Schottenheimer's career. Following the season, Schottenheimer announced his intention to resign after ten seasons with the team, and defensive coordinator Gunther Cunningham assumed coaching duties for 1999.

This was the first time Derrick Thomas was not named to the Pro Bowl roster.

== Offseason ==
On April 9, Marcus Allen announced his retirement.

=== Draft ===
1998 Kansas City Chiefs draft
| Round | Pick | Player | Position | College | Notes |
| 1 | 27 | Victor Riley | Offensive tackle | Auburn | |
| 3 | 88 | Rashaan Shehee | Running back | Washington | |
| 4 | 120 | Greg Favors | Linebacker | Mississippi State | |
| 5 | 128 | Robert Williams | Defensive back | North Carolina | |
| 6 | 181 | Derrick Ransom | Defensive tackle | Cincinnati | |
| 7 | 216 | Eric Warfield | Defensive back | Nebraska | |
| 7 | 224 | Ernest Blackwell | Running back | Missouri | |
Made roster

== Personnel ==
=== Staff ===
1998 Kansas City Chiefs staff
| Front office: Founder – Lamar Hunt; chairman of the board – Jack Steadman; President/general manager/chief executive officer – Carl Peterson; Executive vice-president/assistant general manager – Dennis Thum; Administrative assistant to the head coach – Russ Ball; Head coaches: Head coach – Marty Schottenheimer; Assistant head coach/wide receivers – Al Saunders; Offensive coaches: Offensive coordinator – Jimmy Raye; Quarterbacks – Mike McCarthy; Running backs – Lionel James; Tight ends/offensive assistant – Jim Erkenbeck; Offensive line – Mike Solari; Offensive assistant/quality control – Brian Schottenheimer | Defensive coaches: Defensive coordinator – Gunther Cunningham; Defensive line – Bob Karmelowicz; Linebackers – Woodrow Lowe; Defensive backs – Kurt Schottenheimer; Defensive assistant/quality control – Darvin Wallis; Special teams coaches: Special teams – Mike Stock; Strength and conditioning: Strength and conditioning – Jeff Hurd; Assistant strength and conditioning – Roberto Parker |

=== Roster ===
1998 Kansas City Chiefs roster
| Quarterbacks (QB): 15 Todd Collins; 12 Rich Gannon; 11 Elvis Grbac; Running backs (RB): 38 Kimble Anders; 30 Donnell Bennett; 39 Bam Morris; 49 Tony Richardson FB; 22 Rashaan Shehee; Wide receivers (WR): 82 Derrick Alexander; 84 Joe Horn KR; 83 Danan Hughes; 81 Kevin Lockett PR; 89 Andre Rison; 87 Tamarick Vanover; Tight ends (TE): 88 Tony Gonzalez; 85 Brian Roche | Offensive linemen (OL): 69 Jeff Criswell T; 61 Tim Grunhard C; 67 Brad Kubik G; 62 Glenn Parker G/T; 66 Victor Riley T; 68 Will Shields G; 72 Ricky Siglar T; 73 Jeff Smith C/G; 68 Pete Swanson G; 64 Ralph Tamm; Defensive linemen (DL): 71 Tom Barndt NT; 90 Ronnie Dixon DT; 98 Eric Hicks DE; 75 Chester McGlockton DE/DT; 91 Leslie O'Neal DE; 97 Ty Parten DE; 95 Derrick Ransom DT | Linebackers (LB): 50 Anthony Davis OLB; 56 Ernest Dixon ILB; 59 Donnie Edwards ILB; 54 Greg Favors LB; 55 Ron George OLB; 51 Greg Manusky ILB; 58 Derrick Thomas OLB; 57 Jerrott Willard OLB; Defensive backs (DB): 34 Dale Carter CB; 41 Keith Crawford FS; 40 James Hasty CB; 24 Jason Kaiser CB; 29 Mark McMillian CB; 25 Reggie Tongue SS; 27 Bracy Walker SS; 44 Eric Warfield CB; 46 Robert Williams CB; 21 Jerome Woods FS; Special teams (ST): 5 Louie Aguiar P; 10 Pete Stoyanovich K | Practice squad: 99 Duane Ashman DE; 42 Jesse Haynes RB; 9 Reggie Jones WR; 60 Fred Pollack G; 47 Bob Rosenstiel TE; Reserve: 26 Vashone Adams S (IR); 93 John Browning DE (IR); 94 Sean Manuel TE (IR); 77 Pellom McDaniels DE (IR); 48 Ted Popson TE (IR); 70 Marcus Spears T (IR); 79 Dave Szott G (IR); 53 active, 7 inactive, 5 practice squad Rookies in italics |

== Preseason ==
| Week | Date | Opponent | Result | Record | Venue | Attendance | Recap |
|---|---|---|---|---|---|---|---|
| 1 | August 1 | vs. Green Bay Packers | L 24–27 (OT) | 0–1 | (Japan) Tokyo Dome (Tokyo) | 42,018 | Recap |
| 2 | August 8 | vs. Tampa Bay Buccaneers | W 17–13 | 1–1 | Oklahoma Memorial Stadium (Norman, OK) | 43,657 | Recap |
| 3 | August 15 | at Minnesota Vikings | L 0–34 | 1–2 | Hubert H. Humphrey Metrodome | 60,955 | Recap |
| 4 | August 22 | Jacksonville Jaguars | W 22–21 | 2–2 | Arrowhead Stadium | 71,079 | Recap |
| 5 | August 28 | St. Louis Rams | L 6–10 | 2–3 | Arrowhead Stadium | 69,501 | Recap |

== Regular season ==
The Chiefs began the season well on September 6 with an impressive performance and easily defeated the Oakland Raiders at Arrowhead 28–8. Kansas City sacked the Raiders quarterbacks 10 times, with Derrick Thomas collecting 6 by himself.

On September 13, Kansas City fell to the Jacksonville Jaguars on the road, 21–16.

On September 27, the Chiefs visited the Philadelphia Eagles for the first time in franchise history.

On October 4, Kansas City conquered the Seattle Seahawks and the rain at Arrowhead, 17–6. Rich Gannon hit Andre Rison for an 80-yard touchdown pass after a 54-minute rain delay caused by a violent storm. The two teams combined for nine turnovers, five by Kansas City. The win improved the Chiefs' record to 4–1, however a 6-game losing streak following this game dropped the team to 4–7.

On November 16, against the Denver Broncos, the Chiefs defense was penalized five times on one drive, three of the penalties coming from legendary linebacker Derrick Thomas. The game is known now by Chiefs fans as the "Monday Night Meltdown". After that it was all downhill as the Chiefs suffered their first losing season since 1988.

=== Schedule ===
| Week | Date | Opponent | Result | Record | Venue | Attendance | Recap |
|---|---|---|---|---|---|---|---|
| 1 | September 6 | **Oakland Raiders** | **W** 28–8 | 1–0 | Arrowhead Stadium | 78,945 | Recap |
| 2 | September 13 | at Jacksonville Jaguars | **L** 16–21 | 1–1 | Alltel Stadium | 69,821 | Recap |
| 3 | September 20 | **San Diego Chargers** | **W** 23–7 | 2–1 | Arrowhead Stadium | 73,730 | Recap |
| 4 | September 27 | at Philadelphia Eagles | **W** 24–21 | 3–1 | Veterans Stadium | 66,675 | Recap |
| 5 | October 4 | **Seattle Seahawks** | **W** 17–6 | 4–1 | Arrowhead Stadium | 66,418 | Recap |
| 6 | October 11 | at New England Patriots | **L** 10–40 | 4–2 | Foxboro Stadium | 59,749 | Recap |
| 7 | Bye | | | | | | |
| 8 | October 26 | Pittsburgh Steelers | **L** 13–20 | 4–3 | Arrowhead Stadium | 79,431 | Recap |
| 9 | November 1 | New York Jets | **L** 17–20 | 4–4 | Arrowhead Stadium | 65,104 | Recap |
| 10 | November 8 | at **Seattle Seahawks** | **L** 12–24 | 4–5 | Kingdome | 66,251 | Recap |
| 11 | November 16 | **Denver Broncos** | **L** 7–30 | 4–6 | Arrowhead Stadium | 78,100 | Recap |
| 12 | November 22 | at **San Diego Chargers** | **L** 37–38 | 4–7 | Qualcomm Stadium | 59,894 | Recap |
| 13 | November 29 | Arizona Cardinals | **W** 34–24 | 5–7 | Arrowhead Stadium | 69,613 | Recap |
| 14 | December 6 | at **Denver Broncos** | **L** 31–35 | 5–8 | Mile High Stadium | 74,962 | Recap |
| 15 | December 13 | Dallas Cowboys | **W** 20–17 | 6–8 | Arrowhead Stadium | 77,697 | Recap |
| 16 | December 20 | at New York Giants | **L** 7–28 | 6–9 | Giants Stadium | 66,040 | Recap |
| 17 | December 26 | at **Oakland Raiders** | **W** 31–24 | 7–9 | Network Associates Coliseum | 52,679 | Recap |
Note: Intra-division opponents are in **bold** text.

=== Game summaries ===
==== Week 1: vs. Oakland Raiders ====
Week 1: Oakland Raiders at Kansas City Chiefs – Game summary

| Quarter | 1 | 2 | 3 | 4 | Total |
|---|---|---|---|---|---|
| Raiders | 0 | 0 | 8 | 0 | **8** |
| **Chiefs** | 17 | 3 | 3 | 5 | **28** |

at Arrowhead Stadium, Kansas City, Missouri

- Date: September 6
- Game time: 7:20 p.m. CDT
- Game weather: Hot and clear, 94 °F (34 °C)
- Game attendance: 78,945
- Referee: Ed Hochuli
- TV announcers (ESPN): Mike Patrick, Joe Theismann, Paul Maguire and Solomon Wilcots
- Recap, Game Book

Game information

**First quarter**

- KC – Donnell Bennett 1-yard run (Pete Stoyanovich kick), 9:39. Chiefs 7–0. **Drive: 9 plays, 69 yards, 5:21.**
- KC – Andre Rison 30-yard pass from Elvis Grbac (Pete Stoyanovich kick), 9:22. Chiefs 14–0. **Drive: 1 play, 30 yards, 0:06.**
- KC – Pete Stoyanovich 28-yard field goal, 6:30. Chiefs 17–0. **Drive: 6 plays, 1 yard, 2:33.**

**Second quarter**

- KC – Pete Stoyanovich 19-yard field goal, 12:17. Chiefs 20–0. **Drive: 8 plays, 16 yards, 3:05.**

**Third quarter**

- KC – Pete Stoyanovich 48-yard field goal, 8:17. Chiefs 23–0. **Drive: 7 plays, 37 yards, 3:01.**
- OAK – Harvey Williams 2-yard run (Donald Hollas–Rickey Dudley pass), 0:21. Chiefs 23–8. **Drive: 12 plays, 81 yards, 6:35.**

**Fourth quarter**

- KC – Pete Stoyanovich 33-yard field goal, 10:54. Chiefs 26–8. **Drive: 11 plays, 51 yards, 4:27.**
- KC – Jeff George sacked in end zone by Derrick Thomas for a Safety, 1:58. Chiefs 28–8.

**Top passers**

- OAK – Jeff George – 19/31, 270 yards
- KC – Elvis Grbac – 12/23, 130 yards, TD

**Top rushers**

- OAK – Napoleon Kaufman – 9 rushes, 27 yards
- KC – Donnell Bennett – 24 rushes, 115 yards, TD

**Top receivers**

- OAK – Tim Brown – 7 receptions, 67 yards
- KC – Andre Rison – 4 receptions, 62 yards, TD

==== Week 2: at Jacksonville Jaguars ====
Week 2: Kansas City Chiefs at Jacksonville Jaguars – Game summary

| Quarter | 1 | 2 | 3 | 4 | Total |
|---|---|---|---|---|---|
| Chiefs | 0 | 6 | 3 | 7 | **16** |
| **Jaguars** | 7 | 7 | 7 | 0 | **21** |

at Alltel Stadium, Jacksonville, Florida

- Date: September 13
- Game time: 1:00 p.m. EDT/12:00 p.m. CDT
- Game weather: Sunny and clear, 82 °F (28 °C)
- Game attendance: 69,821
- Referee: Bill Carollo
- TV announcers (CBS): Greg Gumbel, Phil Simms and Armen Keteyian
- Recap, Game Book

Game information

**First quarter**

- JAX – Reggie Barlow 85-yard punt return (Mike Hollis kick), 10:58. Jaguars 7–0.

**Second quarter**

- JAX – Jimmy Smith 17-yard pass from Mark Brunell (Mike Hollis kick), 10:35. Jaguars 14–0. **Drive: 8 plays, 16 yards, 3:05.**
- KC – Pete Stoyanovich 36-yard field goal, 1:05. Jaguars 14–3. **Drive: 14 plays, 72 yards, 5:42.**
- KC – Pete Stoyanovich 43-yard field goal, 0:01. Jaguars 14–6. **Drive: 3 plays, 27 yards, 0:22.**

**Third quarter**

- JAX – James Stewart 1-yard run (Mike Hollis kick), 11:52. Jaguars 21–6. **Drive: 7 plays, 31 yards, 3:08.**
- KC – Pete Stoyanovich 29-yard field goal, 9:03. Jaguars 21–9. **Drive: 7 plays, 56 yards, 2:49.**

**Fourth quarter**

- KC – Kimble Anders 3-yard run (Pete Stoyanovich kick), 3:39. Jaguars 21–16. **Drive: 13 plays, 80 yards, 5:16.**

**Top passers**

- KC – Rich Gannon – 23/37, 263 yards
- JAX – Mark Brunell – 11/18, 126 yards, TD

**Top rushers**

- KC – Donnell Bennett – 13 rushes, 46 yards
- JAX – James Stewart – 26 rushes, 103 yards, TD

**Top receivers**

- KC – Tony Gonzalez – 7 receptions, 67 yards
- JAX – Jimmy Smith – 4 receptions, 57 yards, TD

==== Week 3: vs. San Diego Chargers ====
Week 3: San Diego Chargers at Kansas City Chiefs – Game summary

| Quarter | 1 | 2 | 3 | 4 | Total |
|---|---|---|---|---|---|
| Chargers | 0 | 0 | 7 | 0 | **7** |
| **Chiefs** | 6 | 10 | 7 | 0 | **23** |

at Arrowhead Stadium, Kansas City, Missouri

- Date: September 20
- Game time: 12:00 p.m. CDT
- Game weather: Overcast, 70 °F (21 °C)
- Game attendance: 73,730
- Referee: Dick Hantak
- TV announcers (CBS): Kevin Harlan and Sam Wyche
- Recap, Game Book

Game information

**First quarter**

- KC – Pete Stoyanovich 35-yard field goal, 10:37. Chiefs 3–0. **Drive: 8 plays, 23 yards, 2:42.**
- KC – Pete Stoyanovich 31-yard field goal, 2:11. Chiefs 6–0. **Drive: 11 plays, 47 yards, 6:44.**

**Second quarter**

- KC – Pete Stoyanovich 33-yard field goal, 14:52. Chiefs 9–0. **Drive: 5 plays, 9 yards, 1:26.**
- KC – Andre Rison 44-yard pass from Rich Gannon (Pete Stoyanovich kick), 13:52. Chiefs 16–0. **Drive: 9 plays, 69 yards, 5:21.**

**Third quarter**

- KC – Tony Richardson 1-yard run (Pete Stoyanovich kick), 12:28. Chiefs 23–0. **Drive: 1 play, 37 yards, 0:11.**
- SD – Natrone Means 72-yard run (John Carney kick), 4:25. Chiefs 23–7. **Drive: 1 play, 72 yards, 0:14.**

**Fourth quarter**

- No scoring plays.

**Top passers**

- SD – Ryan Leaf – 1/15, 4 yards, 2 INT
- KC – Rich Gannon – 10/29, 144 yards, TD

**Top rushers**

- SD – Natrone Means – 22 rushes, 165 yards, TD
- KC – Donnell Bennett – 30 rushes, 87 yards

**Top receivers**

- SD – Freddie Jones – 1 reception, 4 yards
- KC – Andre Rison – 1 reception, 44 yards, TD

==== Week 4: at Philadelphia Eagles ====
Week 4: Kansas City Chiefs at Philadelphia Eagles – Game summary

| Quarter | 1 | 2 | 3 | 4 | Total |
|---|---|---|---|---|---|
| **Chiefs** | 0 | 7 | 0 | 17 | **24** |
| Eagles | 7 | 0 | 7 | 7 | **21** |

at Veterans Stadium, Philadelphia, Pennsylvania

- Date: September 27
- Game time: 1:00 p.m. EDT/12:00 p.m. CDT
- Game weather: Sunny, 85 °F (29 °C)
- Game attendance: 66,675
- Referee: Gerry Austin
- TV announcers (CBS): Ian Eagle, Mark May and Beasley Reece
- Recap, Game Book

Game information

**First quarter**

- PHI – Duce Staley 5-yard run (Tom Hutton kick), 3:17. Eagles 7–0. **Drive: 10 plays, 70 yards, 4:52.**

**Second quarter**

- KC – Donnell Bennett 1-yard run (Pete Stoyanovich kick), 13:15. Tied 7–7. **Drive: 9 plays, 73 yards, 5:02.**

**Third quarter**

- PHI – Duce Staley 3-yard run (Tom Hutton kick), 7:23. Eagles 14–7. **Drive: 12 plays, 72 yards, 7:37.**

**Fourth quarter**

- KC – Pete Stoyanovich 21-yard field goal, 11:38. Eagles 14–10. **Drive: 7 plays, 51 yards, 3:57.**
- KC – Donnell Bennett 7-yard run (Pete Stoyanovich kick), 8:41. Chiefs 17–14. **Drive: 2 plays, 69 yards, 1:17.**
- KC – Donnell Bennett 5-yard run (Pete Stoyanovich kick), 3:06. Chiefs 24–14. **Drive: 5 plays, 43 yards, 2:12.**
- PHI – Duce Staley 17-yard pass from Rodney Peete (Tom Hutton kick), 1:01. Chiefs 24–21. **Drive: 12 plays, 80 yards, 2:05.**

**Top passers**

- KC – Rich Gannon – 17/25, 262 yards
- PHI – Rodney Peete – 21/36, 260 yards, TD, INT

**Top rushers**

- KC – Donnell Bennett – 19 rushes, 87 yards, 3 TD
- PHI – Duce Staley – 16 rushes, 73 yards, 2 TD

**Top receivers**

- KC – Kevin Lockett – 4 receptions, 74 yards
- PHI – Jeff Graham – 5 receptions, 79 yards

==== Week 5: vs. Seattle Seahawks ====
Week 5: Seattle Seahawks at Kansas City Chiefs – Game summary

| Quarter | 1 | 2 | 3 | 4 | Total |
|---|---|---|---|---|---|
| Seahawks | 3 | 0 | 3 | 0 | **6** |
| **Chiefs** | 3 | 7 | 7 | 0 | **17** |

at Arrowhead Stadium, Kansas City, Missouri

- Date: October 4
- Game time: 7:20 p.m. CDT
- Game weather: Heavy rain expected, 66 °F (19 °C)
- Game attendance: 66,418
- Referee: Phil Luckett
- TV announcers (ESPN): Mike Patrick, Joe Theismann, Paul Maguire and Solomon Wilcots
- Recap, Game Book

Game information

**First quarter**

- SEA – Todd Peterson 22-yard field goal, 12:05. Seahawks 3–0. **Drive: 5 plays, 12 yards, 1:50.**
- KC – Pete Stoyanovich 22-yard field goal, 0:50. Tied 3–3. **Drive: 10 plays, 45 yards, 6:16.**

**Second quarter**

- KC – Rich Gannon 4-yard run (Pete Stoyanovich kick), 0:13. Chiefs 10–3. **Drive: 6 plays, 17 yards, 2:24.**

**Third quarter**

- SEA – Todd Peterson 28-yard field goal, 10:01. Chiefs 10–6. **Drive: 4 plays, −3 yards, 1:31.**
- KC – Andre Rison 80-yard pass from Rich Gannon (Pete Stoyanovich kick), 0:24. Chiefs 17–6. **Drive: 1 play, 80 yards, 0:12.**

**Fourth quarter**

- No scoring plays.

**Top passers**

- SEA – John Friesz – 8/19, 52 yards, INT
- KC – Rich Gannon – 12/19, 142 yards, TD

**Top rushers**

- SEA – Ricky Watters – 22 rushes, 59 yards
- KC – Donnell Bennett – 17 rushes, 62 yards

**Top receivers**

- SEA – Joey Galloway – 5 receptions, 50 yards
- KC – Andre Rison – 4 receptions, 90 yards, TD

==== Week 6: at New England Patriots ====
Week 6: Kansas City Chiefs at New England Patriots – Game summary

| Quarter | 1 | 2 | 3 | 4 | Total |
|---|---|---|---|---|---|
| Chiefs | 0 | 0 | 7 | 3 | **10** |
| **Patriots** | 7 | 20 | 10 | 3 | **40** |

at Foxboro Stadium, Foxborough, Massachusetts

- Date: October 11
- Game time: 1:00 p.m. EDT/12:00 p.m. CDT
- Game weather: Light rain, 61 °F (16 °C)
- Game attendance: 59,749
- Referee: Larry Nemmers
- TV announcers (CBS): Greg Gumbel, Phil Simms and Armen Keteyian
- Recap, Game Book

Game information

**First quarter**

- NE – Robert Edwards 1-yard run (Adam Vinatieri kick), 4:53. Patriots 7–0. **Drive: 6 plays, 40 yards, 3:47.**

**Second quarter**

- NE – Adam Vinatieri 32-yard field goal, 13:35. Patriots 10–0. **Drive: 11 plays, 33 yards, 4:21.**
- NE – Robert Edwards 15-yard pass from Drew Bledsoe (Adam Vinatieri kick), 9:11. Patriots 17–0. **Drive: 7 plays, 50 yards, 3:17.**
- NE – Ben Coates 2-yard pass from Drew Bledsoe (Adam Vinatieri kick), 2:48. Patriots 24–0. **Drive: 10 plays, 64 yards, 4:27.**
- NE – Adam Vinatieri 38-yard field goal, 0:00. Patriots 27–0. **Drive: 9 plays, 60 yards, 1:53.**

**Third quarter**

- NE – Ben Coates 11-yard pass from Drew Bledsoe (Adam Vinatieri kick), 10:48. Patriots 34–0. **Drive: 8 plays, 81 yards, 4:12.**
- NE – Adam Vinatieri 27-yard field goal, 3:24. Patriots 37–0. **Drive: 9 plays, 35 yards, 5:25.**
- KC – Derrick Alexander 8-yard pass from Elvis Grbac (Pete Stoyanovich kick), 0:52. Patriots 37–7. **Drive: 6 plays, 37 yards, 2:32.**

**Fourth quarter**

- KC – Pete Stoyanovich 33-yard field goal, 14:28. Patriots 37–10. **Drive: 5 plays, 8 yards, 1:10.**
- NE – Adam Vinatieri 20-yard field goal, 6:38. Patriots 40–10. **Drive: 13 plays, 56 yards, 7:40.**

**Top passers**

- KC – Elvis Grbac – 14/29, 144 yards, TD, INT
- NE – Drew Bledsoe – 17/26, 226 yards, 3 TD

**Top rushers**

- KC – Kimble Anders – 4 rushes, 8 yards
- NE – Robert Edwards – 23 rushes, 104 yards, TD

**Top receivers**

- KC – Derrick Alexander – 3 receptions, 43 yards, TD
- NE – Terry Glenn – 7 receptions, 78 yards

==== Week 8: vs. Pittsburgh Steelers ====
Week 8: Pittsburgh Steelers at Kansas City Chiefs – Game summary

| Quarter | 1 | 2 | 3 | 4 | Total |
|---|---|---|---|---|---|
| **Steelers** | 7 | 3 | 3 | 7 | **20** |
| Chiefs | 3 | 3 | 7 | 0 | **13** |

at Arrowhead Stadium, Kansas City, Missouri

- Date: October 26
- Game time: 7:20 p.m. CST
- Game weather: Partly cloudy, 72 °F (22 °C)
- Game attendance: 79,431
- Referee: Bernie Kukar
- TV announcers (ABC): Al Michaels, Dan Dierdorf, Boomer Esiason and Lesley Visser
- Recap, Game Book

Game information

**First quarter**

- PIT – Fred McAfee blocked punt recovery in end zone (Norm Johnson kick), 8:05. Steelers 7–0.
- KC – Pete Stoyanovich 20-yard field goal, 5:08. Steelers 7–3. **Drive: 8 plays, 68 yards, 2:57.**

**Second quarter**

- KC – Pete Stoyanovich 28-yard field goal, 12:36. Steelers 7–6. **Drive: 6 plays, 42 yards, 2:05.**
- PIT – Norm Johnson 34-yard field goal, 0:00. Steelers 10–6. **Drive: 7 plays, 65 yards, 0:52.**

**Third quarter**

- PIT – Norm Johnson 22-yard field goal, 5:30. Steelers 13–6. **Drive: 12 plays, 55 yards, 5:38.**
- KC – Andre Rison 2-yard pass from Elvis Grbac (Pete Stoyanovich kick), 2:28. Tied 13–13. **Drive: 6 plays, 78 yards, 3:02.**

**Fourth quarter**

- PIT – Charles Johnson 5-yard pass from Kordell Stewart (Norm Johnson kick), 10:05. Steelers 20–13. **Drive: 14 plays, 60 yards, 7:23.**

**Top passers**

- PIT – Kordell Stewart – 11/22, 82 yards, TD
- KC – Elvis Grbac – 15/36, 224 yards, TD, 2 INT

**Top rushers**

- PIT – Jerome Bettis – 33 rushes, 119 yards
- KC – Donnell Bennett – 13 rushes, 47 yards

**Top receivers**

- PIT – David Dunn – 2 receptions, 34 yards
- KC – Andre Rison – 7 receptions, 65 yards, TD

==== Week 9: vs. New York Jets ====
Week 9: New York Jets at Kansas City Chiefs – Game summary

| Quarter | 1 | 2 | 3 | 4 | Total |
|---|---|---|---|---|---|
| **Jets** | 0 | 10 | 0 | 10 | **20** |
| Chiefs | 7 | 0 | 3 | 7 | **17** |

at Arrowhead Stadium, Kansas City, Missouri

- Date: November 1
- Game time: 3:05 p.m. CST
- Game weather: Overcast and rainy, 54 °F (12 °C)
- Game attendance: 65,104
- Referee: Walt Coleman
- TV announcers (CBS): Verne Lundquist, Randy Cross and Michele Tafoya
- Recap, Game Book

Game information

**First quarter**

- KC – Tony Richardson 2-yard run (Pete Stoyanovich kick), 3:34. Chiefs 7–0. **Drive: 6 plays, 67 yards, 2:43.**

**Second quarter**

- NYJ – John Hall 20-yard field goal, 13:41. Chiefs 7–3. **Drive: 10 plays, 75 yards, 4:53.**
- NYJ – Dwayne Gordon 31-yard interception return (John Hall kick), 2:34. Jets 10–7.

**Third quarter**

- KC – Pete Stoyanovich 42-yard field goal, 6:17. Tied 10–10. **Drive: 7 plays, 22 yards, 3:35.**

**Fourth quarter**

- KC – Donnell Bennett 1-yard run (Pete Stoyanovich kick), 13:43. Chiefs 17–10. **Drive: 3 plays, 8 yards, 1:05.**
- NYJ – Kyle Brady 20-yard pass from Vinny Testaverde (John Hall kick), 12:53. Tied 17–17. **Drive: 2 plays, 28 yards, 0:50.**
- NYJ – John Hall 32-yard field goal, 0:00. Jets 20–17. **Drive: 7 plays, 30 yards, 1:50.**

**Top passers**

- NYJ – Vinny Testaverde – 20/34, 260 yards, TD, INT
- KC – Elvis Grbac – 13/28, 130 yards, 3 INT

**Top rushers**

- NYJ – Curtis Martin – 30 rushes, 42 yards
- KC – Bam Morris – 13 rushes, 41 yards

**Top receivers**

- NYJ – Wayne Chrebet – 6 receptions, 101 yards
- KC – Derrick Alexander – 3 receptions, 76 yards

==== Week 10: at Seattle Seahawks ====
Week 10: Kansas City Chiefs at Seattle Seahawks – Game summary

| Quarter | 1 | 2 | 3 | 4 | Total |
|---|---|---|---|---|---|
| Chiefs | 3 | 3 | 0 | 6 | **12** |
| **Seahawks** | 14 | 10 | 0 | 0 | **24** |

at Kingdome, Seattle, Washington

- Date: November 8
- Game time: 3:15 p.m. CST/1:15 p.m. PST
- Game weather: None (indoor stadium)
- Game attendance: 66,251
- Referee: Bill Carollo
- TV announcers (CBS): Ian Eagle and Mark May
- Recap, Game Book

Game information

**First quarter**

- KC – Pete Stoyanovich 54-yard field goal, 10:53. Chiefs 3–0. **Drive: 8 plays, 41 yards, 4:07.**
- SEA – Ricky Watters 1-yard run (Todd Peterson kick), 5:18. Seahawks 7–3. **Drive: 11 plays, 77 yards, 5:35.**
- SEA – Ricky Watters 1-yard run (Todd Peterson kick), 3:44. Seahawks 14–3. **Drive: 3 plays, 6 yards, 1:15.**

**Second quarter**

- KC – Pete Stoyanovich 38-yard field goal, 11:50. Seahawks 14–6. **Drive: 9 plays, 23 yards, 3:36.**
- SEA – Todd Peterson 38-yard field goal, 2:00. Seahawks 17–6. **Drive: 5 plays, 46 yards, 1:32.**
- SEA – Darrin Smith 26-yard interception return (Todd Peterson kick), 1:49. Seahawks 24–6.

**Third quarter**

- No scoring plays.

**Fourth quarter**

- KC – Rich Gannon 1-yard run (pass failed), 0:03. Seahawks 24–12. **Drive: 11 plays, 87 yards, 1:51.**

**Top passers**

- KC – Rich Gannon – 20/32, 177 yards, INT
- SEA – Warren Moon – 12/20, 108 yards, 2 INT

**Top rushers**

- KC – Rich Gannon – 3 rushes, 29 yards, TD
- SEA – Ricky Watters – 24 rushes, 105 yards, 2 TD

**Top receivers**

- KC – Derrick Alexander – 7 receptions, 91 yards
- SEA – Joey Galloway – 1 reception, 45 yards

==== Week 11: vs. Denver Broncos ====
Week 11: Denver Broncos at Kansas City Chiefs – Game summary

| Quarter | 1 | 2 | 3 | 4 | Total |
|---|---|---|---|---|---|
| **Broncos** | 14 | 6 | 3 | 7 | **30** |
| Chiefs | 0 | 7 | 0 | 0 | **7** |

at Arrowhead Stadium, Kansas City, Missouri

- Date: November 16
- Game time: 7:20 p.m. CST
- Game weather: Clear, 54 °F (12 °C)
- Game attendance: 78,100
- Referee: Dick Hantak
- TV announcers (ABC): Al Michaels, Dan Dierdorf, Boomer Esiason and Lesley Visser
- Recap, Game Book

Game information

**First quarter**

- DEN – Bubby Brister 38-yard run (Jason Elam kick), 12:18. Broncos 7–0. **Drive: 5 plays, 67 yards, 2:42.**
- DEN – Terrell Davis 41-yard run (Jason Elam kick), 7:36. Broncos 14–0. **Drive: 3 plays, 79 yards, 1:05.**

**Second quarter**

- KC – Kimble Anders 4-yard pass from Rich Gannon (Pete Stoyanovich kick), 6:31. Broncos 14–7. **Drive: 14 plays, 87 yards, 7:44.**
- DEN – Jason Elam 42-yard field goal, 3:19. Broncos 17–7. **Drive: 8 plays, 40 yards, 3:12.**
- DEN – Jason Elam 46-yard field goal, 0:14. Broncos 20–7. **Drive: 5 plays, 40 yards, 0:57.**

**Third quarter**

- DEN – Jason Elam 35-yard field goal, 3:05. Broncos 23–7. **Drive: 13 plays, 80 yards, 7:05.**

**Fourth quarter**

- DEN – Derek Loville 2-yard run (Jason Elam kick), 3:11. Broncos 30–7. **Drive: 9 plays, 60 yards, 4:25.**

**Top passers**

- DEN – Bubby Brister – 13/23, 180 yards
- KC – Rich Gannon – 26/39, 224 yards, TD, INT

**Top rushers**

- DEN – Terrell Davis – 18 rushes, 111 yards, TD
- KC – Bam Morris – 9 rushes, 20 yards

**Top receivers**

- DEN – Shannon Sharpe – 3 receptions, 56 yards
- KC – Kimble Anders – 10 receptions, 75 yards, TD

==== Week 12: at San Diego Chargers ====
Week 12: Kansas City Chiefs at San Diego Chargers – Game summary

| Quarter | 1 | 2 | 3 | 4 | Total |
|---|---|---|---|---|---|
| Chiefs | 7 | 7 | 13 | 10 | **37** |
| **Chargers** | 7 | 10 | 0 | 21 | **38** |

at Qualcomm Stadium, San Diego, California

- Date: November 22
- Game time: 3:15 p.m. CST/1:15 p.m. PST
- Game weather: Clear and sunny, 74 °F (23 °C)
- Game attendance: 59,894
- Referee: Tony Corrente
- TV announcers (CBS): Don Criqui and Beasley Reece
- Recap, Game Book

Game information

**First quarter**

- SD – Terrell Fletcher 4-yard run (John Carney kick), 9:33. Chargers 7–0. **Drive: 8 plays, 61 yards, 3:18.**
- KC – Derrick Alexander 35-yard pass from Rich Gannon (Pete Stoyanovich kick), 7:05. Tied 7–7. **Drive: 5 plays, 80 yards, 2:28.**

**Second quarter**

- SD – Tremayne Stephens 2-yard run (John Carney kick), 13:21. Chargers 14–7. **Drive: 14 plays, 76 yards, 8:44.**
- SD – John Carney 31-yard field goal, 9:07. Chargers 17–7. **Drive: 5 plays, 21 yards, 2:55.**
- KC – Bam Morris 2-yard run (Pete Stoyanovich kick), 6:15. Chargers 17–14. **Drive: 7 plays, 63 yards, 2:52.**

**Third quarter**

- KC – Bam Morris 1-yard run (Pete Stoyanovich kick), 14:26. Chiefs 21–17. **Drive: 1 play, 42 yards, 0:11.**
- KC – Pete Stoyanovich 27-yard field goal, 3:31. Chiefs 24–17. **Drive: 7 plays, 23 yards, 3:59.**
- KC – Pete Stoyanovich 42-yard field goal, 0:53. Chiefs 27–17. **Drive: 4 plays, 9 yards, 1:29.**

**Fourth quarter**

- KC – Bam Morris 3-yard run (Pete Stoyanovich kick), 11:46. Chiefs 34–17. **Drive: 6 plays, 53 yards, 2:56.**
- SD – Terrell Fletcher 4-yard run (John Carney kick), 8:01. Chiefs 34–24. **Drive: 7 plays, 91 yards, 3:45.**
- KC – Pete Stoyanovich 50-yard field goal, 5:28. Chiefs 37–24. **Drive: 6 plays, 53 yards, 2:33.**
- SD – Freddie Jones 25-yard pass from Craig Whelihan (John Carney kick), 4:14. Chiefs 37–31. **Drive: 5 plays, 77 yards, 1:14.**
- SD – Charlie Jones 1-yard pass from Craig Whelihan (John Carney kick), 0:09. Chargers 38–37. **Drive: 7 plays, 63 yards, 0:42.**

**Top passers**

- KC – Rich Gannon – 20/33, 304 yards, TD, INT
- SD – Craig Whelihan – 19/37, 279 yards, 2 TD, INT

**Top rushers**

- KC – Bam Morris – 23 rushes, 39 yards, 3 TD
- SD – Terrell Fletcher – 16 rushes, 52 yards, 2 TD

**Top receivers**

- KC – Derrick Alexander – 5 receptions, 173 yards, TD
- SD – Freddie Jones – 5 receptions, 78 yards, TD

==== Week 13: vs. Arizona Cardinals ====
Week 13: Arizona Cardinals at Kansas City Chiefs – Game summary

| Quarter | 1 | 2 | 3 | 4 | Total |
|---|---|---|---|---|---|
| Cardinals | 0 | 10 | 7 | 7 | **24** |
| **Chiefs** | 7 | 7 | 10 | 10 | **34** |

at Arrowhead Stadium, Kansas City, Missouri

- Date: November 29
- Game time: 12:00 p.m. CST
- Game weather: Cloudy, 71 °F (22 °C)
- Game attendance: 69,613
- Referee: Larry Nemmers
- TV announcers (Fox): Tim Ryan, Bill Maas, Ronnie Lott and Kevin McCabe
- Recap, Game Book

Game information

**First quarter**

- KC – Bam Morris 1-yard run (Pete Stoyanovich kick), 4:13. Chiefs 7–0. **Drive: 2 plays, 4 yards, 0:41.**

**Second quarter**

- ARI – Joe Nedney 37-yard field goal, 14:53. Chiefs 7–3. **Drive: 10 plays, 56 yards, 4:20.**
- KC – Donnell Bennett 2-yard pass from Rich Gannon (Pete Stoyanovich kick), 10:51. Chiefs 14–3. **Drive: 7 plays, 38 yards, 4:02.**
- ARI – Rob Moore 10-yard pass from Jake Plummer (Joe Nedney kick), 2:25. Chiefs 14–10. **Drive: 7 plays, 38 yards, 4:02.**

**Third quarter**

- KC – Derrick Alexander 30-yard pass from Rich Gannon (Pete Stoyanovich kick), 12:05. Chiefs 21–10. **Drive: 6 plays, 80 yards, 2:55.**
- KC – Pete Stoyanovich 37-yard field goal, 4:02. Chiefs 24–10. **Drive: 5 plays, 23 yards, 2:50.**
- ARI – Adrian Murrell 4-yard run (Joe Nedney kick), 1:50. Chiefs 24–17. **Drive: 4 plays, 80 yards, 2:12.**

**Fourth quarter**

- KC – Derrick Alexander 15-yard pass from Rich Gannon (Pete Stoyanovich kick), 10:26. Chiefs 31–17. **Drive: 11 plays, 76 yards, 6:24.**
- ARI – Mario Bates 1-yard run (Joe Nedney kick), 6:07. Chiefs 31–24. **Drive: 10 plays, 80 yards, 4:19.**
- KC – Pete Stoyanovich 18-yard field goal, 1:57. Chiefs 34–24. **Drive: 10 plays, 66 yards, 4:10.**

**Top passers**

- ARI – Jake Plummer – 20/37, 250 yards, TD, 2 INT
- KC – Elvis Grbac – 21/28, 231 yards, 3 TD, INT

**Top rushers**

- ARI – Adrian Murrell – 13 rushes, 77 yards, TD
- KC – Bam Morris – 15 rushes, 76 yards, TD

**Top receivers**

- ARI – Frank Sanders – 6 receptions, 100 yards
- KC – Derrick Alexander – 6 receptions, 116 yards, 2 TD

==== Week 14: at Denver Broncos ====
Week 14: Kansas City Chiefs at Denver Broncos – Game summary

| Quarter | 1 | 2 | 3 | 4 | Total |
|---|---|---|---|---|---|
| Chiefs | 21 | 0 | 7 | 3 | **31** |
| **Broncos** | 7 | 14 | 0 | 14 | **35** |

at Mile High Stadium, Denver, Colorado

- Date: December 6
- Game time: 3:15 p.m. CST/2:15 p.m. MST
- Game weather: Partly cloudy, 35 °F (2 °C)
- Game attendance: 74,962
- Referee: Johnny Grier
- TV announcers (CBS): Greg Gumbel, Phil Simms and Armen Keteyian
- Recap, Game Book

Game information

**First quarter**

- KC – Andre Rison 26-yard pass from Rich Gannon (Pete Stoyanovich kick), 10:41. Chiefs 7–0. **Drive: 1 play, 26 yards, 0:06.**
- KC – Kimble Anders 11-yard pass from Rich Gannon (Pete Stoyanovich kick), 6:26. Chiefs 14–0. **Drive: 6 plays, 37 yards, 3:25.**
- DEN – Terrell Davis 1-yard run (Jason Elam kick), 5:06. Chiefs 14–7. **Drive: 4 plays, 73 yards, 1:23.**
- KC – Bam Morris 1-yard run (Pete Stoyanovich kick), 0:12. Chiefs 21–7. **Drive: 9 plays, 69 yards, 4:54.**

**Second quarter**

- DEN – Terrell Davis 1-yard run (Jason Elam kick), 6:31. Chiefs 21–14. **Drive: 10 plays, 51 yards, 4:54.**
- DEN – Ed McCaffrey 13-yard pass from John Elway (Jason Elam kick), 3:00. Tied 21–21. **Drive: 3 plays, 65 yards, 1:10.**

**Third quarter**

- KC – Joe Horn 26-yard pass from Rich Gannon (Pete Stoyanovich kick), 3:40. Chiefs 28–21. **Drive: 9 plays, 80 yards, 3:54.**

**Fourth quarter**

- KC – Pete Stoyanovich 20-yard field goal, 8:25. Chiefs 31–21. **Drive: 11 plays, 47 yards, 5:23.**
- DEN – Terrell Davis 1-yard run (Jason Elam kick), 6:48. Chiefs 31–28. **Drive: 4 plays, 54 yards, 1:37.**
- DEN – Shannon Sharpe 24-yard pass from John Elway (Jason Elam kick), 3:34. Broncos 35–31. **Drive: 5 plays, 50 yards, 2:39.**

**Top passers**

- KC – Rich Gannon – 27/43, 330 yards, 3 TD
- DEN – John Elway – 22/32, 400 yards, 2 TD, INT

**Top rushers**

- KC – Bam Morris – 7 rushes, 14 yards, TD
- DEN – Terrell Davis – 24 rushes, 88 yards, 3 TD

**Top receivers**

- KC – Derrick Alexander – 6 receptions, 68 yards
- DEN – Rod Smith – 8 receptions, 165 yards

==== Week 15: vs. Dallas Cowboys ====
Week 15: Dallas Cowboys at Kansas City Chiefs – Game summary

| Quarter | 1 | 2 | 3 | 4 | Total |
|---|---|---|---|---|---|
| Cowboys | 0 | 3 | 0 | 14 | **17** |
| **Chiefs** | 3 | 0 | 14 | 3 | **20** |

at Arrowhead Stadium, Kansas City, Missouri

- Date: December 13
- Game time: 3:15 p.m. CST
- Game weather: Mostly cloudy, 53 °F (12 °C)
- Game attendance: 77,697
- Referee: Bob McElwee
- TV announcers (Fox): Pat Summerall and John Madden
- Recap, Game Book

Game information

**First quarter**

- KC – Pete Stoyanovich 24-yard field goal, 5:21. Chiefs 3–0. **Drive: 14 plays, 83 yards, 6:23.**

**Second quarter**

- DAL – Richie Cunningham 32-yard field goal, 4:21. Tied 3–3. **Drive: 7 plays, 17 yards, 2:27.**

**Third quarter**

- KC – Bam Morris 1-yard run (Brad Daluiso kick), 4:01. Chiefs 10–3. **Drive: 11 plays, 50 yards, 7:12.**
- KC – Rich Gannon 9-yard run (Pete Stoyanovich kick), 0:37. Chiefs 17–3. **Drive: 6 plays, 35 yards, 2:57.**

**Fourth quarter**

- DAL – Patrick Jeffers 28-yard pass from Troy Aikman (Richie Cunningham kick), 10:25. Chiefs 17–10. **Drive: 10 plays, 63 yards, 5:12.**
- KC – Pete Stoyanovich 43-yard field goal, 5:56. Chiefs 20–10. **Drive: 8 plays, 43 yards, 4:29.**
- DAL – Emmitt Smith 8-yard pass from Troy Aikman (Richie Cunningham kick), 2:48. Chiefs 20–17. **Drive: 9 plays, 72 yards, 3:08.**

**Top passers**

- DAL – Troy Aikman – 18/35, 199 yards, 2 TD, INT
- KC – Rich Gannon – 19/40, 200 yards

**Top rushers**

- DAL – Emmitt Smith – 14 rushes, 42 yards
- KC – Bam Morris – 27 rushes, 137 yards, TD

**Top receivers**

- DAL – Patrick Jeffers – 5 receptions, 74 yards, TD
- KC – Tony Gonzalez – 5 receptions, 65 yards

==== Week 16: at New York Giants ====
Week 16: Kansas City Chiefs at New York Giants – Game summary

| Quarter | 1 | 2 | 3 | 4 | Total |
|---|---|---|---|---|---|
| Chiefs | 0 | 0 | 7 | 0 | **7** |
| **Giants** | 14 | 7 | 7 | 0 | **28** |

at Giants Stadium, East Rutherford, New Jersey

- Date: December 20
- Game time: 1:00 p.m. EST/12:00 p.m. CST
- Game weather: Cloudy, 49 °F (9 °C)
- Game attendance: 66,040
- Referee: Ron Winter
- TV announcers (CBS): Kevin Harlan and Sam Wyche
- Recap, Game Book

Game information

**First quarter**

- NYG – Percy Ellsworth 42-yard interception return (Brad Daluiso kick), 13:46. Giants 7–0.
- NYG – Amani Toomer 12-yard pass from Kent Graham (Brad Daluiso kick), 6:21. Giants 14–0. **Drive: 12 plays, 83 yards, 5:26.**

**Second quarter**

- NYG – Gary Brown 1-yard run (Brad Daluiso kick), 3:46. Giants 21–0. **Drive: 8 plays, 44 yards, 2:53.**

**Third quarter**

- NYG – Kent Graham 1-yard run (Brad Daluiso kick), 6:30. Giants 28–0. **Drive: 7 plays, 67 yards, 3:56.**
- KC – Tony Gonzalez 4-yard pass from Elvis Grbac (Pete Stoyanovich kick), 2:41. Giants 28–7. **Drive: 7 plays, 80 yards, 3:49.**

**Fourth quarter**

- No scoring plays.

**Top passers**

- KC – Elvis Grbac – 11/20, 160 yards, TD, 2 INT
- NYG – Kent Graham – 16/33, 167 yards, TD

**Top rushers**

- KC – Bam Morris – 13 rushes, 42 yards
- NYG – Gary Brown – 25 rushes, 103 yards, TD

**Top receivers**

- KC – Derrick Alexander – 6 receptions, 97 yards
- NYG – Amani Toomer – 4 receptions, 49 yards, TD

==== Week 17: at Oakland Raiders ====
Week 17: Kansas City Chiefs at Oakland Raiders – Game summary

| Quarter | 1 | 2 | 3 | 4 | Total |
|---|---|---|---|---|---|
| **Chiefs** | 0 | 7 | 17 | 7 | **31** |
| Raiders | 14 | 0 | 3 | 7 | **24** |

at Network Associates Coliseum, Oakland, California

- Date: December 26
- Game time: 3:00 p.m. CST/1:00 p.m. PST
- Game weather: Partly cloudy, 51 °F (11 °C)
- Game attendance: 52,679
- Referee: Mike Carey
- TV announcers (CBS): Verne Lundquist, Randy Cross and Michele Tafoya
- Recap, Game Book

Game information

**First quarter**

- OAK – Tim Brown 13-yard pass from Wade Wilson (Greg Davis, 8:22. Raiders 7–0. **Drive: 9 plays, 58 yards, 4:41.**
- OAK – Randy Jordan 10-yard run (Greg Davis kick), 2:18. Raiders 14–0. **Drive: 3 plays, 30 yards, 1:25.**

**Second quarter**

- KC – Bam Morris 1-yard run (Pete Stoyanovich kick), 12:38. Raiders 14–7. **Drive: 10 plays, 64 yards, 4:40.**

**Third quarter**

- KC – Bam Morris 1-yard run (Pete Stoyanovich kick), 11:16. Tied 14–14. **Drive: 5 plays, 71 yards, 1:28.**
- OAK – Greg Davis 44-yard field goal, 7:15. Raiders 17–14. **Drive: 9 plays, 55 yards, 4:01.**
- KC – Pete Stoyanovich 30-yard field goal, 3:53. Tied 17–17. **Drive: 6 plays, 53 yards, 3:22.**
- KC – Derrick Thomas 44-yard fumble return (Pete Stoyanovich kick), 1:15. Chiefs 24–17.

**Fourth quarter**

- OAK – James Jett 15-yard pass from Jeff George (Greg Davis kick), 9:17. Tied 24–24. **Drive: 3 plays, 46 yards, 1:12.**
- KC – Tony Gonzalez 20-yard pass from Elvis Grbac (Pete Stoyanovich kick), 5:56. Chiefs 31–24. **Drive: 6 plays, 76 yards, 3:21.**

**Top passers**

- KC – Elvis Grbac – 20/32, 254 yards, TD, 2 INT
- OAK – Jeff George – 9/18, 138 yards, TD

**Top rushers**

- KC – Bam Morris – 17 rushes, 96 yards, 2 TD
- OAK – Randy Jordan – 16 rushes, 24 yards, TD

**Top receivers**

- KC – Derrick Alexander – 3 receptions, 80 yards
- OAK – Tim Brown – 10 receptions, 140 yards, TD

=== Standings ===
AFC West
| | W | L | T | PCT | PF | PA | STK |
|---|---|---|---|---|---|---|---|
| ^{(1)} Denver Broncos | 14 | 2 | 0 | .875 | 501 | 309 | W1 |
| Oakland Raiders | 8 | 8 | 0 | .500 | 288 | 356 | L1 |
| Seattle Seahawks | 8 | 8 | 0 | .500 | 372 | 310 | L1 |
| Kansas City Chiefs | 7 | 9 | 0 | .438 | 327 | 363 | W1 |
| San Diego Chargers | 5 | 11 | 0 | .313 | 241 | 342 | L5 |

== Awards and records ==
The team was penalized 158 times for 1,304 yards, an NFL record that stood until the Oakland Raiders surpassed it in 2011.
