= Buster Stanley =

American football player (born 1970)

Profile
- Positions: Defensive tackle, Defensive guard, Nose tackle

Personal information
- Born: May 14, 1970 (age 56); Youngstown, Ohio, U.S.
- Listed height: 6 ft 2 in (1.88 m)
- Listed weight: 283 lb (128 kg)

Career information
- College: Michigan

Career history
- 1990–1993: Michigan Wolverines
- 1994: New England Patriots
- 1996–1997: Rhein Fire
- 1999–2000: Grand Rapids Rampage

Awards and highlights
- AFL All-Rookie Team (1999); Second-team All-Big Ten (1993); Dick Katcher Award (1993)
- Stats at Pro Football Reference

Sylvester "Buster" Stanley Jr. (born November 30, 1970) is an American former professional football player. Stanley played college football for the Michigan Wolverines from 1990 to 1993 and was the most valuable player (MVP) of their 1993 team. He played professionally for the New England Patriots (1994), Rhein Fire (1996–1997) and Grand Rapids Rampage (1999–2000).

== Early life ==
Stanley was born and raised in Youngstown, Ohio. His father, Sylvester Stanley Sr., worked at a General Motors plant in Youngstown. His mother, Theodora, was a licensed practical nurse. As a senior in high school, Stanley was named by the Detroit Free Press to its "Best of the Midwest" team and was selected as the UPI Lineman of the Year for the first time.

== University of Michigan ==
After graduating from Youngstown's East High School, Stanley accepted an athletic scholarship to the University of Michigan, choosing Michigan over offers from Ohio State University and Michigan State University. He played at the defensive tackle and middle guard positions for the Michigan Wolverines football teams from 1990 to 1993. After a lackluster defensive performance against Houston in 1993, Stanley called a defensive team meeting. Stanley noted, "We had a little meeting (last) Sunday — just the (defensive) players and we got everything out and came out with a better attitude this week. We wanted to come out and play 'Michigan defense.'" The following week against Iowa, Stanley "led an inspired effort by the Wolverines defensive front", allowing only 48 yards on the ground. Stanley had 10 tackles in the game, including three for losses and two quarterback sacks. Stanley was selected as the MVP and a co-captain of the 1993 Michigan Wolverines football team. He also won the Dick Katcher award in 1993 as the team's outstanding defensive lineman or outside linebacker. Stanley graduated from the University of Michigan in 1994 with a Bachelor of Arts degree in kinesiology.

== Professional football ==
He played as a nose guard for the New England Patriots in 1994. In 1996 and 1997, he played for the Rhein Fire in the World League of American Football. He was an assistant strength and conditioning coach at the University of Michigan from 1997 to 1999. He played for the Grand Rapids Rampage in the Arena Football League from 1999 to 2000. While playing for Grand Rapids, Stanley received the Rampage Award as the "Best Player for the Organization" and was named to the Arena Football League's All-Rookie Team.

== Later life ==
After retiring from football, Stanley worked as an account representative for Worthington Steel (1999–2003) and as a sales representative for U.S. Smokeless Tobacco Brands (2003–2009).
