= Derrick Ransom =

American football player (born 1976)

No. 95, 90
- Position: Defensive tackle

Personal information
- Born: September 13, 1976 (age 50); Indianapolis, Indiana, U.S.
- Listed height: 6 ft 3 in (1.91 m)
- Listed weight: 306 lb (139 kg)

Career information
- High school: Lawrence Central (Indianapolis, Indiana)
- College: Cincinnati
- NFL draft: 1998: 6th round, 181st overall pick

Career history
- Kansas City Chiefs (1998–2002); Arizona Cardinals (2003); Jacksonville Jaguars (2004)

Career NFL statistics
- Tackles: 94
- Sacks: 4.5
- Fumble recoveries: 1
- Stats at Pro Football Reference

Derrick Wayne Ransom Jr. (born September 13, 1976) is an American former professional football player who was a defensive tackle for seven seasons in the National Football League (NFL) for the Kansas City Chiefs, Arizona Cardinals, and Jacksonville Jaguars. He played college football for the Cincinnati Bearcats and was selected in the sixth round of the 1998 NFL draft with the 181st overall pick.
