= Todd Collins (quarterback) =

American football player (born 1971)

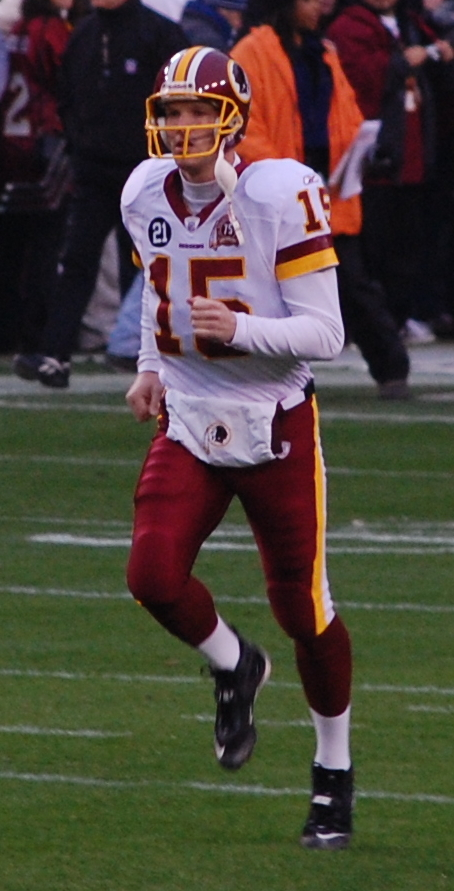
- Collins with the Washington Redskins in 2007

No. 15, 10, 14
- Position: Quarterback

Personal information
- Born: November 5, 1971 (age 55); Walpole, Massachusetts, U.S.
- Listed height: 6 ft 4 in (1.93 m)
- Listed weight: 223 lb (101 kg)

Career information
- High school: Walpole
- College: Michigan (1990–1994)
- NFL draft: 1995: 2nd round, 45th overall pick

Career history
- Buffalo Bills (1995–1997); Kansas City Chiefs (1998–2005); Washington Redskins (2006–2009); Chicago Bears (2010)

Awards and highlights
- Second-team All-Big Ten (1994); 1994 Holiday Bowl Offensive Player of the Game

Career NFL statistics
- Passing attempts: 701
- Passing completions: 391
- Completion percentage: 55.8%
- TD–INT: 22–24
- Passing yards: 4,547
- Passer rating: 71.8
- Stats at Pro Football Reference

Todd Steven Collins (born November 5, 1971) is an American former professional football player who was a quarterback in the National Football League (NFL). He played college football for the Michigan Wolverines and was selected by the Buffalo Bills in the second round of the 1995 NFL draft.

Collins also played for the Kansas City Chiefs and Washington Redskins. After beginning his career as the heir apparent to Jim Kelly and largely failing in that position, he spent the rest of his NFL career as a backup quarterback, spending several years serving behind Elvis Grbac and Trent Green of the Chiefs. He holds the NFL record for longest gap between starts in post-merger history, ten years and two days. Collins is now the offensive coordinator for the Walpole High School varsity football team.

== Early life ==
Collins was born in Walpole, Massachusetts. Collins attended Walpole High School, located just a few miles from Foxboro, Massachusetts, the home of the New England Patriots. As a senior he led his football team to a state championship, a feat that helped earn him SuperPrep All-America honors. Collins was named New England Player of the Year by the Boston Globe.

As a junior, he held a 10–0 record for the baseball team as a right-handed pitcher. Also that year, he guided his basketball squad to the state semifinals, garnering 18 points and 10 rebounds a game along the way.

== College career ==
Collins attended and played football at the University of Michigan from 1990 to 1994, though he was redshirted as a freshman in 1990. He completed one of two passes in the Rose Bowl as a redshirt freshman on January 1, 1992, after netting 15 completions on 24 attempts for 135 yards during the regular season. Collins started two games as a sophomore in 1992 when he completed 66 of 101 passes for 693 yards with seven touchdowns and three interceptions. As an All-Big Ten Conference Honorable Mention and Academic All-Big Ten as a junior in 1993, he led the squad to a 42–7 Hall of Fame Bowl victory over NC State. His best collegiate season came that junior year when he hit on 189 of 296 attempts for 2,509 yards with 17 touchdowns and seven interceptions. In his senior season (1994), he connected on 186 of 288 attempts for 2,518 yards with 13 touchdowns and ten interceptions en route to a 24–14 Holiday Bowl win over Colorado State. Collins' collegiate passing totals read 457 completions on 711 attempts for 5,858 yards with 37 touchdowns and 20 interceptions, which comes out to a 145.0 career quarterback efficiency rating. Collins and Michigan's 1994 squad are most remembered for beating Notre Dame on a last second field goal by Remy Hamilton and for losing to Colorado on Kordell Stewart's Hail Mary pass known as the Miracle at Michigan.

=== College records ===
- Record for the best career completion percentage (64.28%) in Michigan history (since broken); this is also the second best mark in Big Ten Conference history.
- Ranks third in Michigan annals in passing efficiency (145.0) behind Elvis Grbac (148.1) and Jim Harbaugh (145.6). His mark is also fifth in conference history.
- Finished his career at Michigan second only to Grbac in pass attempts, completions, and yards. He now ranks fourth in those three categories having since been passed by John Navarre and Chad Henne.
- Passed for at least 200 yards in 14 games, the most of any player in Wolverines history to that point. Collins now ranks fourth in games with 200+ passing yards behind Navarre (28), Henne (26), and Tom Brady (15).

== Professional career ==
Pre-draft measurables
Height	Weight	Arm length	Hand span	40-yard dash	10-yard split	20-yard split	20-yard shuttle	Vertical jump
6 ft 4 5/8 in (1.95 m)	224 lb (102 kg)	32 1/2 in (0.83 m)	9 1/2 in (0.24 m)	5.07 s	1.77 s	2.88 s	4.34 s	30.0 in (0.76 m)
All values from NFL Combine

=== Buffalo Bills ===
Collins was selected in the 1995 NFL draft by the Buffalo Bills in the second round with the 45th overall pick. In 1995, he earned the Bills backup job, playing in seven games with one start. That season, he hit on 14 of 29 attempts for 112 yards with one interception. In 1996, Collins was the number two Bills quarterback behind Jim Kelly, and saw action in seven games (three starts), completing 55 of 99 attempts (55.6%) with four touchdowns and five interceptions.

Collins was considered Kelly's heir apparent when Kelly announced his retirement following the 1996 season. In 1997, he won the Bills starting job at quarterback after beating out Alex Van Pelt and Billy Joe Hobert in training camp and saw duty in 14 games (13 starts) where he completed 215 of 391 passes (55.0%), good for 2,367 yards with 12 touchdowns, and 13 interceptions. Under Collins's leadership, the Bills missed the playoffs for only the second time since 1988, prompting the Bills to release Collins after one season as starter and sign Rob Johnson and Doug Flutie as his replacements.

=== Kansas City Chiefs ===
Collins signed with the Kansas City Chiefs in 1998, where he did not see any regular season game action the first three seasons. For his first three seasons, Collins was the third-string quarterback behind Rich Gannon and Warren Moon. Between 2001 and 2005, he was listed as the Chiefs’ backup quarterback in all the games, seeing action in 12 games.

=== Washington Redskins ===
On March 14, 2006, Collins was signed by the Washington Redskins to a two-year, $2.5 million contract. Collins was brought in because offensive coordinator Al Saunders had knowledge of Collins and knew he could assist as a signal caller and backup.

On December 6, 2007, Collins replaced Redskins quarterback Jason Campbell, who was injured. Taking charge of a team depleted by injuries and drained by the shooting death of safety Sean Taylor nine days earlier, Collins completed 15 of 20 passes for 224 yards and two touchdowns, leading the Redskins to a 24–16 victory. Collins won NFC Offensive Player of the Week honors for his performance against the Chicago Bears. Coach Joe Gibbs was particularly pleased with the performance, saying "I don't know that I've ever had a better performance coming off the bench. Ever."

Following the victory over the Chicago Bears (which improved the Redskins to 6–7), Collins led the Redskins to three more consecutive victories to close out the regular season. Those victories were over the New York Giants, the Minnesota Vikings, and a 27–6 win over the Dallas Cowboys in the season finale. The Redskins' four straight victories at the end of the season left them with a 9–7 record, securing the Redskins' bid for a wild card playoff berth against the Seattle Seahawks. Collins finished the season with a quarterback rating of 106.4. Following completion of the regular season, he was voted NFC Offensive Player of the Month for December.

In the wild card playoff game against the Seahawks, Collins completed 29 of 50 passes for 266 yards and two touchdowns. He also threw two interceptions in the fourth quarter, both of which were returned for touchdowns by the Seahawks defense. These were Collins' first interceptions since the 1997 season. The Redskins lost the game by a score of 35–14, eliminating them from further postseason competition.

In 2008 and 2009, Collins again backed up Jason Campbell. On February 29, 2008, despite interest from the Jacksonville Jaguars, Collins was re-signed by the Redskins. His three-year contract was worth an estimated $9 million. Collins took no snaps in the 2008 season. In the 2009 season he saw action in three games as a backup, throwing 12 for 23 for 144 yards. On October 3, 2009, Collins said he would retire after the 2009 NFL season. On March 4, 2010, Collins was released by the Redskins.

=== Chicago Bears ===
In August 2010, Collins was signed by the Chicago Bears to a one-year deal. Terms of the deal were not disclosed. He started their fourth preseason game. Collins made the roster as the second-string quarterback after Jay Cutler and ahead of Caleb Hanie. Collins played for the Bears in the fourth game of the season, beginning the second half of the Week 4 matchup against the New York Giants when starter Jay Cutler suffered a concussion in the first half. Collins finished that game 4 for 11 for 36 yards, no touchdowns and one interception. The Bears lost 17–3, their first loss of the season, falling to 3–1. He would fill in for Cutler in Week 5 against the Carolina Panthers. In that start, Collins completed six of 16 passes for 32 yards, threw four interceptions and had a passer rating of 6.2. He was relieved at the end of the third quarter by Caleb Hanie. The Bears won 23–6. Collins also saw limited action in the Bears' 21–14 NFC Championship game loss to the Packers, relieving the injured Cutler in the third quarter before being replaced by Hanie after suffering a shoulder injury. This was the final game of his career.

=== NFL statistics ===
Career high in bold

Year	Team	GP	GS	Record	Comp	Att	Pct	Yds	Avg	TD	Int	Rate	Lng
1995	BUF	7	1	0–1	14	29	48.3%	112	3.9	0	1	44.0	18
1996	BUF	7	3	2–1	55	99	55.6%	739	7.5	4	5	71.9	**95**
1997	BUF	**14**	**13**	5–8	**215**	**391**	55.0%	**2,367**	6.1	**12**	**13**	69.5	77
1998	KC	0	0	DNP									
1999	KC	0	0	DNP									
2000	KC	0	0	DNP									
2001	KC	1	0	—	3	4	75.0%	40	10.0	0	0	106.2	26
2002	KC	3	0	—	5	6	**83.3%**	73	**12.2**	1	0	**156.9**	29
2003	KC	5	0	—	9	12	75.0%	74	6.2	0	0	90.3	20
2004	KC	2	0	—	1	5	20.0%	42	8.4	0	0	62.1	42
2005	KC	2	0	—	0	0	0	0	0	0	0	0	0
2006	WAS	1	0	—	0	0	0	0	0	0	0	0	0
2007	WAS	4	3	**3–0**	67	105	63.8%	888	8.5	5	0	106.4	54
2008	WAS	0	0	DNP									
2009	WAS	3	0	—	12	23	52.2%	144	6.3	0	0	71.6	46
2010	CHI	2	1	1–0	10	27	37.0%	68	2.5	0	5	5.9	19
Career		51	21	11–10	391	701	55.8	4,547	6.5	22	24	71.8	95

== See also ==
- Lists of Michigan Wolverines football passing leaders
