= Tyrone Wheatley =

American football player and coach (born 1972)

Current position
- Title: Running backs coach
- Team: Illinois
- Conference: Big Ten

Biographical details
- Born: January 19, 1972 (age 54); Inkster, Michigan, U.S.

Playing career
- 1991–1994: Michigan
- 1995–1998: New York Giants
- 1999: Miami Dolphins (Note: Offseason and/or practice squad member only)
- 1999–2004: Oakland Raiders
- Position: Running back

Coaching career (HC unless noted)
- 2007: Robichaud HS (MI)
- 2008: Ohio Northern (RB)
- 2009: Eastern Michigan (RB)
- 2010–2012: Syracuse (RB)
- 2013–2014: Buffalo Bills (RB)
- 2015–2016: Michigan (RB)
- 2017–2018: Jacksonville Jaguars (RB)
- 2019–2021: Morgan State
- 2022: Denver Broncos (RB)
- 2023–2025: Wayne State (MI)
- 2026–present: Illinois (RB)

Head coaching record
- Overall: 10–46 (college)

Accomplishments and honors

Awards
- As a player: Big Ten Offensive Player of the Year (1992); 2× First-team All-Big Ten (1992, 1993)

Tyrone Anthony Wheatley Sr. (born January 19, 1972) is an American former professional player and college football who is the running backs coach for Illinois. Previously, he served as the head coach of the Wayne State (MI) and as the running backs coach of the Denver Broncos of the National Football League (NFL). He played as a running back for 10 seasons in the NFL.

In high school, Wheatley was named Michigan's athlete of the year in both football and track and field. He attended the University of Michigan and earned first-team All-Big Ten Conference honors on Big Ten Champion football and track teams. He ranks among the Wolverines' all-time rushing leaders in numerous categories, and his name appears in several places in the Big Ten football record book. He was named to All-Big Ten teams in football and track and field a total of four times, and he earned portions of seven Big Ten championships (two team awards for football, one team award for indoor track, one award for 110 meter hurdles, and three awards for individual football statistical performances).

Following his graduation from the University of Michigan, Wheatley was selected by the New York Giants of the NFL in the first round of the 1995 NFL draft. He was traded to the Miami Dolphins, but cut before the 1999 season began. He signed with the Oakland Raiders and led the team in rushing three times, and twice finishing among the NFL's top ten players in rushing touchdowns. During his NFL career (1995–2004), he totaled over 6,500 all-purpose yards as a running back and kickoff returner.

After retiring from the NFL, Wheatley returned to his hometown to coach his high school alma mater, Hamilton J. Robichaud High School. He has served as the running backs coach for the Ohio Northern Polar Bears, the Eastern Michigan Eagles, the Syracuse Orange and the Michigan Wolverines on college; and for the Buffalo Bills, the Denver Broncos, and the Jacksonville Jaguars of the NFL. He has served as the head coach of Morgan State and Wayne State (MI).

== Early life ==
Wheatley was born in Inkster, Michigan. Wheatley's father (also named Tyrone) suffered a mortal gunshot wound to the head in 1974 when Wheatley was two years old. Wheatley's stepfather died of a heart attack when he was 13, leaving behind Wheatley, his sister, and half-brother, two-year-old Leslie Mongo. Shortly afterward, Wheatley's mother, Patricia, was laid off and became an alcoholic. With the effective loss of his two parents, Wheatley and his sister were forced to move in with an aunt, where he lived through the rest of his childhood. Due to family difficulties, Wheatley acted as the guardian of two cousins and his half brother. Mongo was ten years younger than Wheatley, and graduated from high school in New Jersey in 2004—thirteen years after Wheatley had graduated from high school.

Wheatley was involved in competitive athletics from an early age: In his youth, he ran competitively with the Penn Park track team, where, as an eight-year-old, he stood out for his discipline and promptness. Because of his family trouble, he assumed a family leadership role at a relatively young age. Wheatley made it clear to his brothers and sisters that when chaos came to their lives, they should to turn to him because he would be there and he would never fall. When he was in high school, he would take his younger siblings to basketball games, mapping out emergency plans for shooting outbreaks or brawls. Wheatley's guardianship continued throughout his career at the University of Michigan and while he was a professional athlete. While playing in the NFL, he realized that leaving Mongo—the youngest of his siblings—in Inkster and merely providing financial support was not a solution because Mongo was still exposed to gang shootings. As Mongo's guardian, Wheatley moved Mongo to New Jersey for school. Mongo later earned outstanding freshman athlete honors during the Bergen County, New Jersey outdoor track championships while living with Wheatley, who was playing for the Giants at the time. In 2004, with his graduation from high school imminent, Mongo signed a letter of intent with Utah State as a defensive back.

== School career ==
=== High school ===
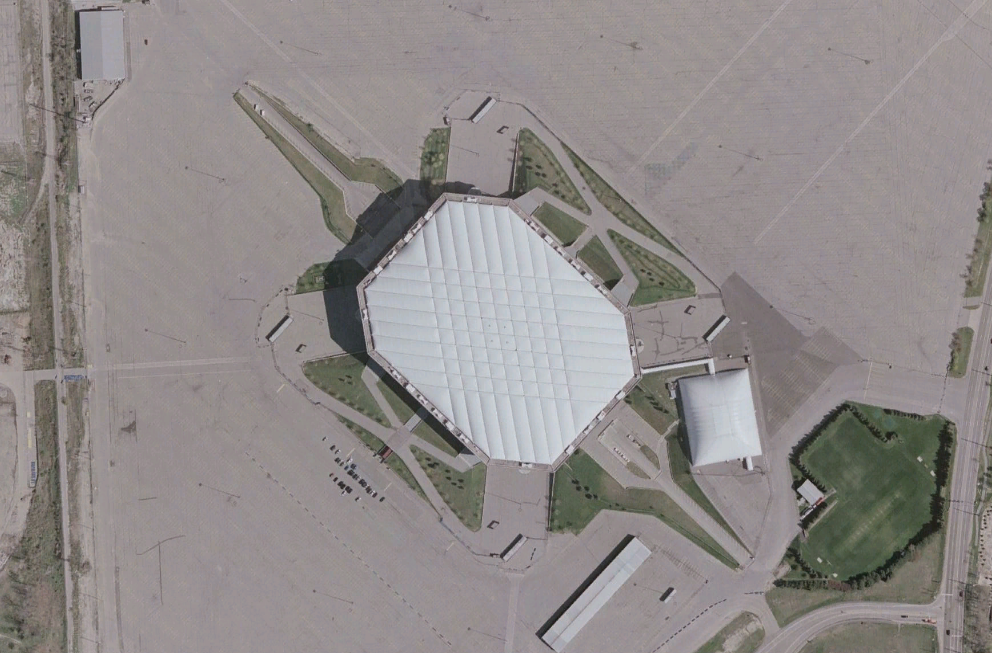
The Silverdome hosted the MHSAA state football championships from 1976 to 2004.

Wheatley attended Hamilton J. Robichaud High School in Dearborn Heights, Michigan, a neighboring municipality of Inkster. During his time at Robichaud High School, he became a nine-time MHSAA state champion (seven-time individual in track and field, one-time team each in track and field and football). He is among the highest-scoring football players in Michigan high school history, and he led his high school to the state football championships while playing eight different positions and being named the Michigan Football Player of the year. In the 1990 MHSAA Championship game against upper peninsula powerhouse Kingsford High School at the Pontiac Silverdome, Wheatley ran for 165 yards and a touchdown in a 21–7 victory. That season, he led the Bulldogs to a 12–1 record, and to their only state football championship. He has been described as the greatest football player in Michigan High School history.

In track and field, he won the Michigan High School Track and Cross Country Athlete of the Year award in 1991. However, at one point Wheatley had quit the track team because the coach refused to let him run four individual events as a sprinter, jumper and hurdler. The coach relented, and Wheatley became a seven-time MHSAA Class B individual state champion by winning the long jump, 100 meters, 110-meter hurdles both his junior and senior seasons and winning the 200 meters as junior. In his junior year, he led his school to the state Class B track championships, and he became the first individual four-time track and field state champion in the same year in MHSAA history. Through the 2007 MHSAA season he was the MHSAA All class long jump record holder with a 1991 leap of 24 ft 7 in (7.49 m), his high school 100 meters time (10.59 seconds, 1990) continues to rank third in MHSAA history, and his 110-meter hurdles time (13.87 sec., 1991) ranked seventh in MHSAA history. In addition, through the 2007 track season his hurdle time continued to be a MHSAA lower peninsula Class B state record. His long jump record has been retired. Wheatley became a high school All-American in track, and he was also a member of successful relay teams in high school. He had made a name for himself as a nine-time Michigan High School Athletic Association (MHSAA) state champion athlete. His athleticism and jumping abilities were further exhibited in basketball; Wheatley played for his high school basketball team and was able to slam dunk. He claims that against his high school rival, Inkster High School, he performed a dunk from the foul line, which is a difficult dunk made famous in slam dunk competitions by Julius Erving (Dr. J.) and later revived by Michael Jordan. Yet, despite his versatility and promise, Wheatley considered turning down athletic scholarships in hopes of obtaining an academic scholarship.

=== College ===
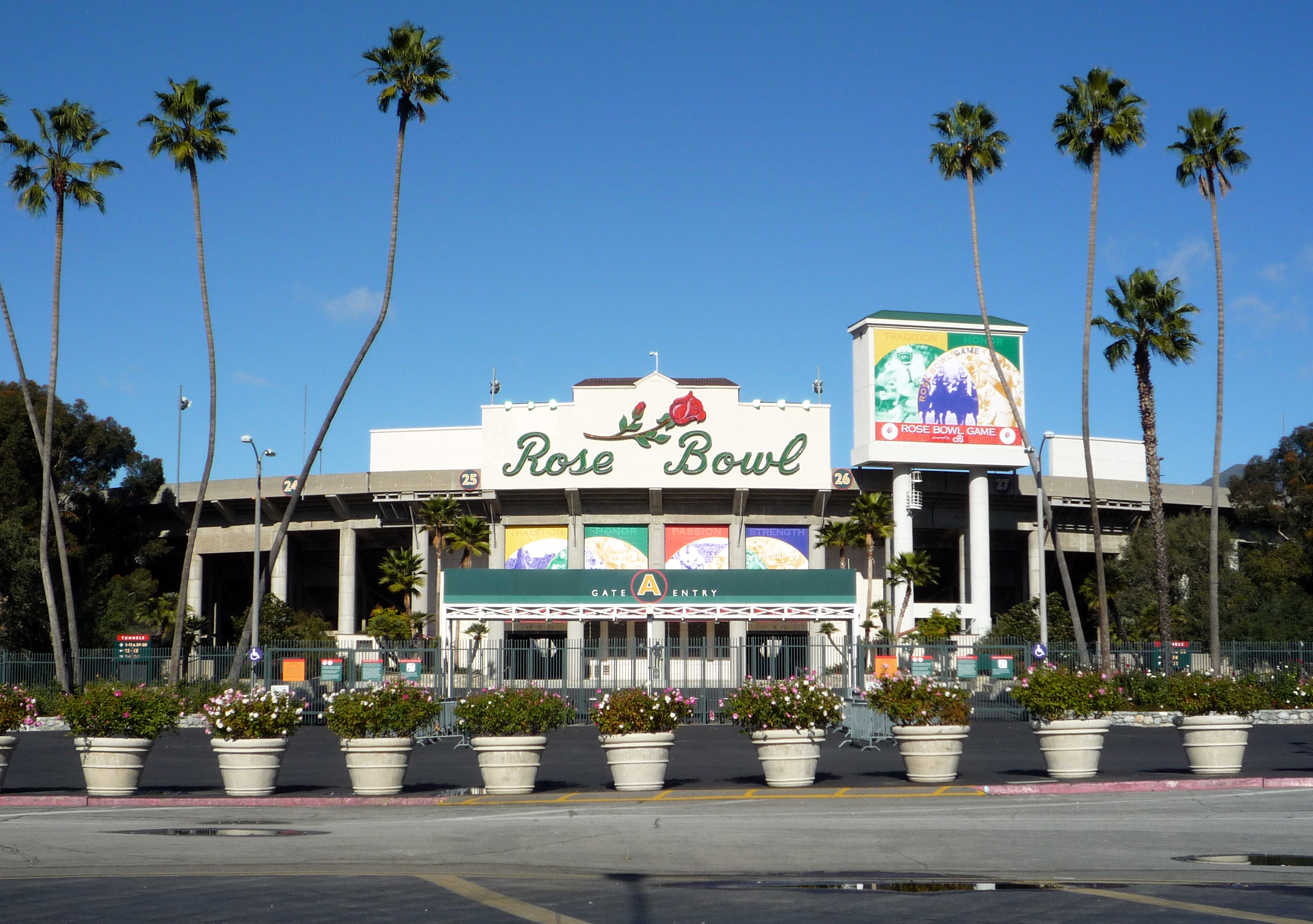
Wheatley earned the 1993 Rose Bowl MVP.

Wheatley chose to remain in metropolitan Detroit and attend the University of Michigan on an athletic scholarship. He played running back for the football team for four years and ran on the track team for three years. As both a football player and track athlete he was highly decorated; he earned first-team All-Big Ten honors on teams that won Big Ten Championships in both sports and All-American Honors in track. In football, he set and retains numerous school records and in track he achieved some of the fastest times in school history. Offensive coordinator Fred Jackson recalled that Wheatley was always prompt, never overweight, played while injured, and even babysat for Jackson's children. Wheatley was described in the press as a football player who put his team ahead of himself.

Wheatley wore #6 for the Michigan Wolverines football program from 1991 to 1994. At the end of the 2007 season, he ranked third in Michigan football history in career points and second in career touchdowns (behind Anthony Thomas) with forty seven rushing touchdowns, six receiving touchdowns and one kickoff return for a touchdown. His 47 rushing touchdowns, which ranked third in Big Ten history at the end of his career, ranked fifth behind Ron Dayne (71), Anthony Thompson (68), Pete Johnson (56) and Thomas through the 2006 season. His 17 touchdowns in 1992 ranks as the fifth most productive offensive season in Michigan history. In 1992, he was the Big Ten rushing and scoring champion in an offense where Michigan quarterback Elvis Grbac was also a statistical Big Ten champion. He earned the Big Ten Offensive Player of the Year Award that season and capped the season off by earning the MVP of the 1993 Rose Bowl on a 235-yard, 15-carry performance against Washington Huskies, which included touchdown runs of 88, 56 and 24 yards.

Through the 2012 season, he ranked fifth on the Michigan career rushing yards list (behind Mike Hart, Denard Robinson, Anthony Thomas, and Jamie Morris) with 4,178 yards. His 1992 sophomore season 7.3 yards per carry is a Michigan single-season record (minimum 75 attempts), and his freshman yards per carry average ranks fourth at Michigan since 1949 (and it is a Michigan Freshman record). He has both the best and second-best single-game (minimum 15 carries) yards per carry performances in Michigan history. He was a three-time All Big Ten selection.

As a freshman for the 1991 Wolverines, Wheatley set the Michigan freshman yards per attempt record with 555 yards on 86 carries for a 6.4 yards per attempt. In his sophomore year, he broke through with his first of three consecutive first team All-Big Ten selections. He rushed for 1,357 yards and 13 Rushing touchdowns in addition to 3 Receiving touchdowns and recording a kickoff return touchdown while subbing for the injured Ricky Powers. Wheatley had amassed the most touchdowns by a running back in Michigan history by the end of his junior year and was a professional prospect. In 1993 at the end of his junior season 1993 Wolverines, he earned the MVP award of the 1994 Hall of Fame Bowl. Wheatley had finished 8th in the 1993 Heisman Trophy race. Before LeShon Johnson's 306 yard effort in November of that season against Iowa team that Wheatley had rushed for 113 yards against, Wheatley had been mentioned as the best running back in the nation, but Johnson's effort and Bam Morris' final three games of 223, 222 and 223 yards led to Bam Morris winning the Doak Walker Award. Most who finished ahead of him in the Heisman voting either were seniors (Ward, Glenn Foley, Johnson) or gave up their amateur eligibility and declared early for the draft (Heath Shuler, David Palmer, Marshall Faulk), which made Wheatley one of the favorites for the award if he stayed in college for one more year. He stayed at Michigan for another year with the stated intent of obtaining his degree, but stayed without receiving the degree. However, the preseason 1994 Heisman Trophy favorite (along with 7th-place finisher J. J. Stokes), missed the beginning of the season with an injury to the same shoulder that had caused him to miss two games in 1993. His return to the lineup on September 24, 1994, was overshadowed by The Miracle at Michigan. His senior season return to the 1994 Wolverines had been a surprise, but injuries allowed Tshimanga Biakabutuka and Ed Davis to get some playing time. He only finished 12th in the Heisman balloting as a senior. Nonetheless, he thought that his senior-year experience broadened his horizons.

In college, Wheatley also competed in track and earned varsity letters in 1993–1995. In 1994, he was the Big Ten outdoor 110 metre hurdles champion, was selected first team All-Big Ten, and was a member of the men's indoor track and field team that won the indoor Big Ten team championship. He placed eighth at the 1995 NCAA outdoor championships in the 110 meter hurdles, which earned him All-American honors. At the end of his Michigan track career, he owned the third fastest indoor 60m time in Michigan history at 6.80 seconds as well as the second fastest outdoor 110 metre hurdles time at 13.77 seconds and third fastest outdoor 100 meters at 10.46 seconds. Gradually, succeeding athletes have surpassed his times, and after the 2007 season the 110 meter hurdle time ranked fourth best and the 100 meter dash time was fifth.

== Professional career ==
Pre-draft measurables
| Height | Weight | Arm length | Hand span | 40-yard dash | 10-yard split | 20-yard split | 20-yard shuttle | Vertical jump |
|---|---|---|---|---|---|---|---|---|
| 6 ft 0 in (1.83 m) | 232 lb (105 kg) | 32 7/8 in (0.84 m) | 9 1/8 in (0.23 m) | 4.53 s | 1.66 s | 2.71 s | 4.27 s | 35.5 in (0.90 m) |
All values from NFL Combine

=== New York Giants ===
==== Dan Reeves era (1995–1996) ====
Wheatley was drafted by the New York Giants in the first round of the 1995 NFL draft with the seventeenth overall selection. He held out for 17 days before signing a five-year contract with the team. The terms included a $2.3 million signing bonus and escalating base salaries totaling over $2.9 million. The negotiations were prolonged in part because of extensive family involvement. Wheatley set no goals for himself and lived by his grandmother's motto on preparing oneself: "You can set your sails, but you can't set the wind". The Giants viewed Wheatley as their running back of the future, since Rodney Hampton was in the final year of his contract. Despite the original visions, Wheatley was used sparingly and started only eight games over the course of four seasons with the Giants. Off the field, Wheatley moved his half-brother with him to New Jersey to keep him out of the tumultuous environment and to provide him a strong learning environment.

In 1995 and 1996, under Dan Reeves the Giants had losing seasons and relied heavily on Rodney Hampton who received the bulk of the carries on rushing plays. In 1995, running back Herschel Walker received more passing downs and in 1996 fullback Charles Way was a main weapon. Wheatley returned kickoffs for the 1995 and 1996, with 10 returns for 18.6 yards per return in 1995 and 23 returns for 21.9 yards per return in 1996. While Hampton led the team in rushing with 827 yards to Wheatley's 400 yards in 1996, Wheatley's 503 return yards and 51 yards receiving gave him the team all-purpose yards leadership. However, Wheatley had 6 fumbles on only 147 touches (112 rushes, 12 receptions, and 23 kickoff returns).

The drafting of Wheatley had been hotly contested. Some Giant draft war-room personnel had wanted to select Korey Stringer and others had an interest in Rashaan Salaam when the Giants' selection came. After Wheatley was selected with the seventeenth pick, running backs Napoleon Kaufman, James Stewart and Rashaan Salaam were chosen with the eighteenth, nineteenth and twenty-first selections, respectively. Reeves made it no secret that he would have selected Salaam over Wheatley in the draft. Wheatley's introduction to the Giants was a contract squabble that kept him from getting to training camp on time. Then, in rookie season training camp, he had the misfortune of pulling a hamstring while running sprints on the first day. Speculation had been that the injury had occurred in a stumble in a June track meet. Reeves held the prompt injury against the running back he never wanted. Wheatley later fell asleep in a meeting which drew a fine from Reeves. Although he only actually fell asleep in one meeting, he also had mental concentration issues in practice. He was not known for living erratically so his falling asleep and loss of concentration was enough of a problem that the Giants had Wheatley evaluated. On top of this, Wheatley was fined several times for tardiness to team meetings.

==== Jim Fassel era (1997–1998) ====
In 1997, by the end of training camp, Rodney Hampton's knees had given out, and although Wheatley had a great camp, Tiki Barber was named the starting tailback. That season, Jim Fassel's first, the Giants went to the playoffs with a 10–5–1 record. Wheatley led the team in carries that season despite missing two games and shared the ballcarrying responsibilities with Way and Barber. On October 12, Wheatley had his first 100-yard game with 102 yards on 22 carries against the Arizona Cardinals in a 27–13 victory on the road. While Wheatley and Way divided the rushing load, Barber and Way divided most of the responsibility for the running backs' role in the passing attack, while Wheatley had less than half as many receptions and reception yards as either of them. An ankle injury caused Wheatley to miss the final two regular season games and the wild card playoff game.

By 1998, Wheatley was the only four-year veteran in the Giants backfield and although he developed another good relationship with an offensive coordinator, he was becoming accustomed to being described as an enigma. The Giants fell to 8–8 while relying on Barber, Way and Gary Brown. During the season, Wheatley often performed scout team duties and was inactive for some games. Fassel was not sympathetic to Wheatley's desire for playing time and thought that Wheatley was overweight. Over the course of the season, there was controversy about a season long weight limit of 235 pounds (107 kg; 16 st 11 lb) that had been placed on Wheatley. Wheatley's playing weight limit had been set at 230 pounds (104 kg; 16 st 6 lb) in training camp and had been raised to 235 on Wheatley's request. He had played at 233 pounds (106 kg; 16 st 9 lb) in the final game of his college career. By week 11, Wheatley had only dressed in five games and played in four and was relegated to a role as an alternate when he played.

Wheatley thought he was treated unfairly in New York although two different coaching staffs had issues with him. He points out double standards that gave him bad feelings in retrospect. In situations where he was not the only Giant who was overweight or stuck in traffic, he was punished while others were not and those with worse problems such as showing up at practice drunk or being cited for D.U.I. were not vilified. Wheatley had the responsibility of driving his brother, Leslie Mongo, to his school that opened at 8:15 and thought he was the victim of New Jersey traffic in relation to occasionally being late for 9:00 a.m. team meetings. Charles Way, by contrast, Wheatley's closest friend on the team and roommate on the road, was nicknamed "Teacher's Pet."

According to The New York Times, there was a misperception of Wheatley as a "cancer" in the locker room by most accounts. Although he had some issues, his teammates remembered him for his personality and mannerly nature. The general opinion of Wheatley was that he had enormous talent, but as a package he was an enigma. According to Michael Strahan, Wheatley "...could outrun the wide receivers, outlift the linemen and outdebate anyone." Thus, his off-season workout pattern of sloughing the weights for discussion of politics and current affairs was troubling, but not challenged because he could outlift most. However, in addition to the enigmatic issues, Wheatley had physical problems in New York. He was injured and unable to perform for parts of all four of the training camps. After the 1998 season Wheatley was traded to Jimmy Johnson's Miami Dolphins. In the February trade, the Giants were satisfied receiving a seventh round draft pick in return.

=== Oakland Raiders ===
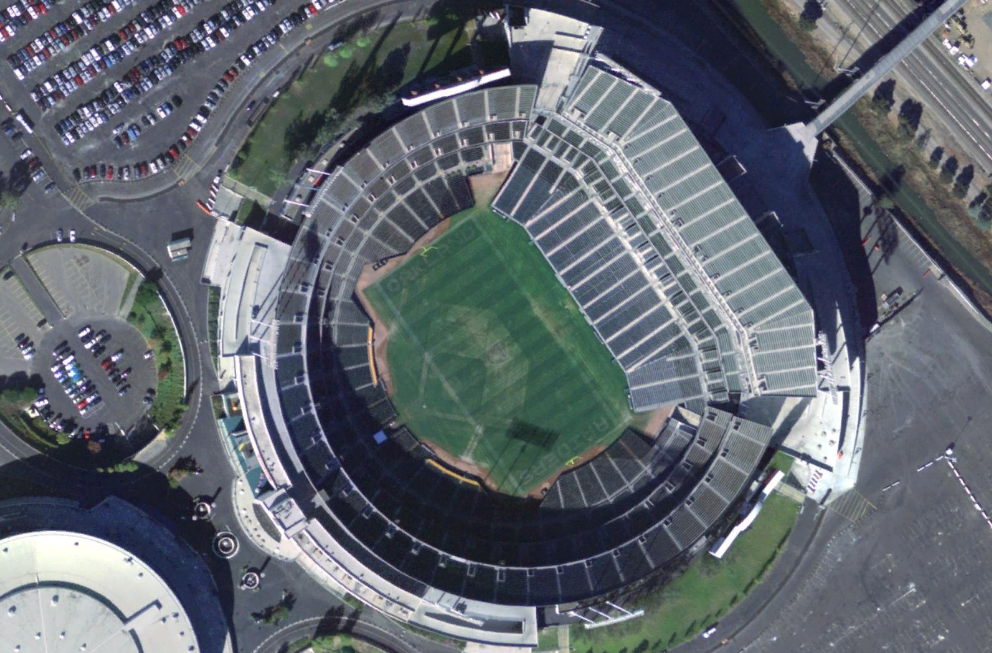
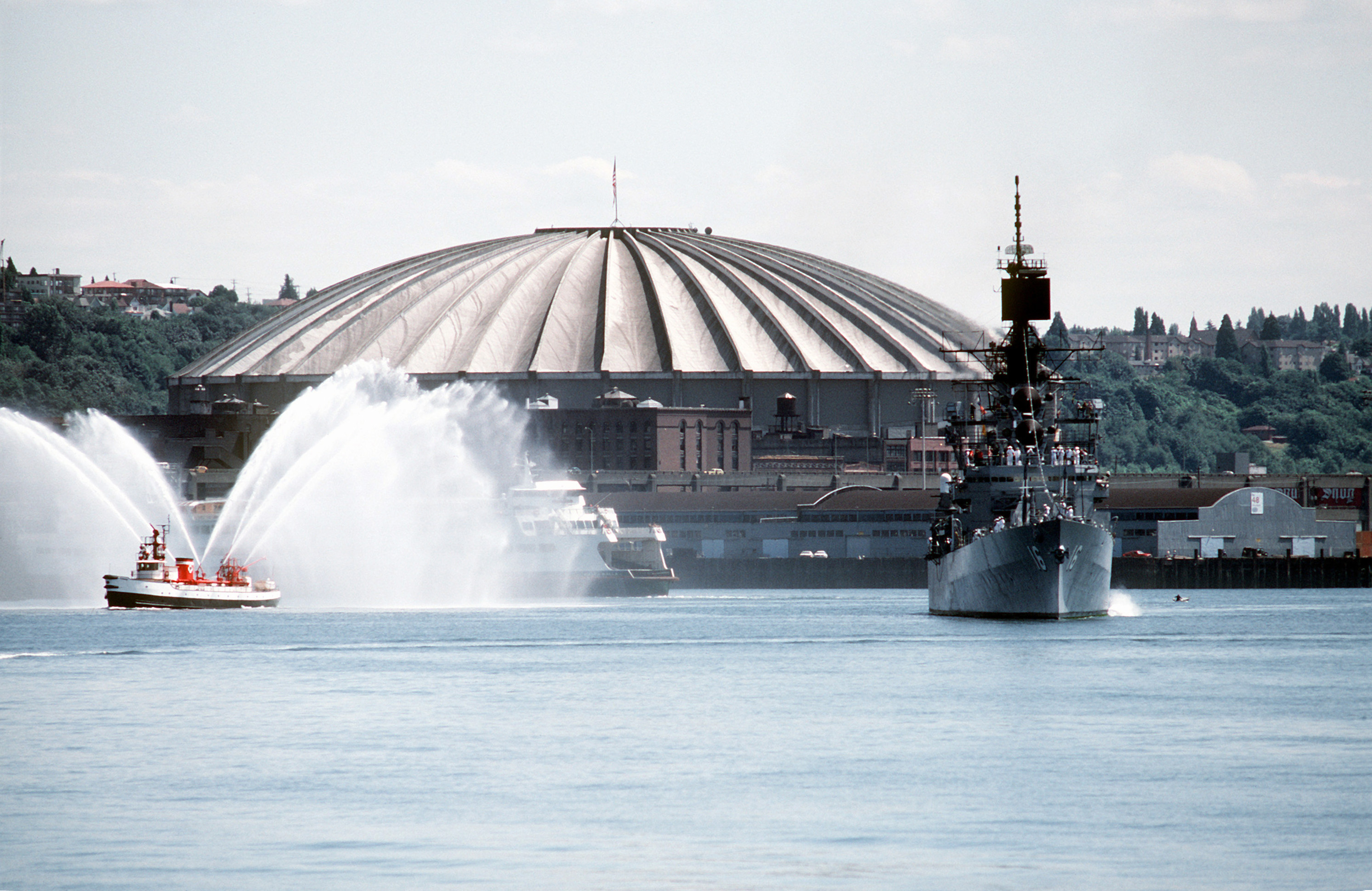
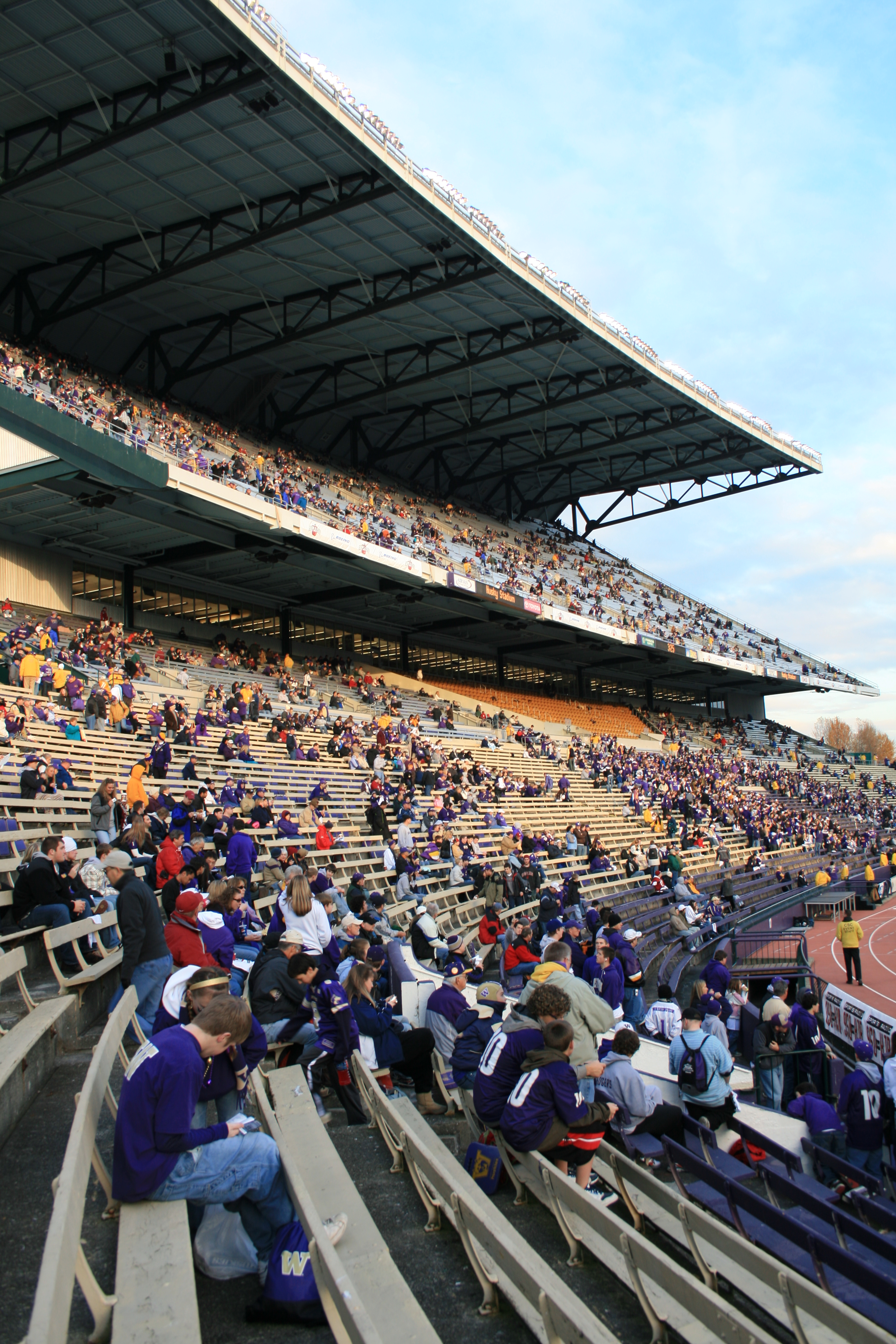
As a Raider, Wheatley had five 100-yard rushing games in home wins at the Oakland Coliseum (left) and two in losses against the Seattle Seahawks at the Kingdome (center) and Husky Stadium (right).

The Dolphins hoped that Wheatley would compete for the starting tailback position with Abdul-Karim al-Jabbar, who had rushed for a league-leading 15 touchdowns in 1997 but whose production had fallen off to only 6 in 1998. However, Wheatley was cut from the Miami Dolphins training camp roster. He had only gone through one week of Dolphins training camp before being released, making him available to the Raiders. The Raiders signed Wheatley on August 4, 1999, to help make up for the loss of Zack Crockett who suffered a broken foot. Ironically, Wheatley, the seventeenth overall selection in the 1995 NFL draft, earned his 1999 roster spot in a battle with Rashaan Salaam, the twenty-first overall selection in the 1995 NFL Draft, who had been Dan Reeves' preferred draft choice in 1995. Wheatley was paired in the Raiders backfield with Napoleon Kaufman, the eighteenth overall selection in the 1995 NFL Draft.

While in Oakland, Wheatley would achieve much greater success than he had in New York. Wheatley rushed for 1,000 yards in a season, led the Raiders in rushing three times, appeared in three consecutive playoffs (including one Super Bowl) and finished in the top-10 in the NFL for rushing touchdowns twice. Through the 2007 NFL season, Wheatley was the seventh leading rusher in Oakland Raider history with 3,682 yards as a Raider. In his role as a Raider, Wheatley was able to contribute to some of the greatest memories in the history of the franchise. Seven of his eight career 100-yard rushing games came as a Raider. Five of these games were at the Oakland Coliseum and two were on the road against the Seattle Seahawks. None of these games came in the playoffs where his highest rushing total was 56 yards.

==== Jon Gruden era (1999–2001) ====
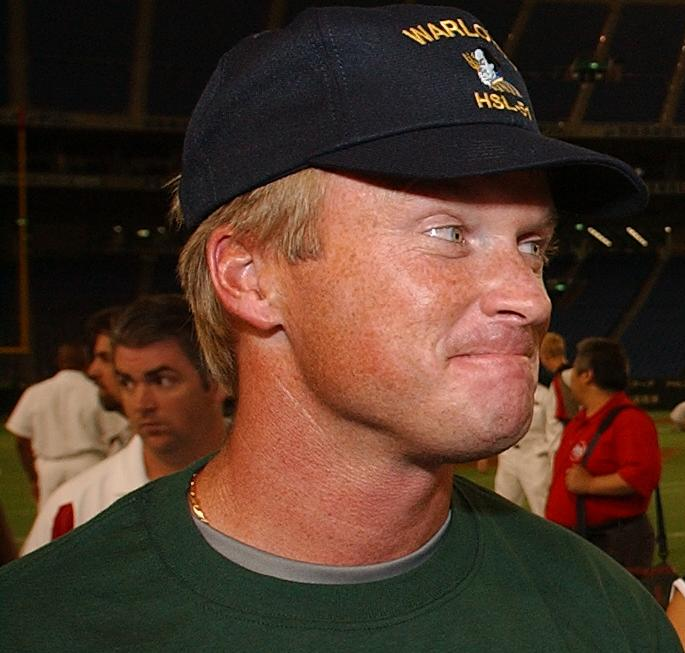
Jon Gruden's west coast offense brought out the best in veterans like Wheatley.

How well Wheatley complemented Napoleon Kaufman in Oakland was quickly evident to the New York media, and his newfound success was noticed when the Giants had an impotent running game in his absence. In his early years with the Raiders, Wheatley quickly made good on the promise of his potential with a combination of the power to run inside and the speed to run outside. Wheatley was quite popular in Oakland. The players liked him and his coach, Jon Gruden, even joked with him during his interviews.

On the field, Wheatley became an important part of an efficient West Coast offense run by Jon Gruden. In 1999, Wheatley was the Raiders' leading rusher and their only running back to have more than one touchdown reception. For the first time, Wheatley had multiple 100-yard games in the same season: 100 yards on 20 rushes on October 3 against the Seattle Seahawks and 111 yards on 19 rushes on December 19 against the Tampa Bay Buccaneers. The players gelled as a unit. Wheatley had his best seasons in Oakland, and some long time NFL veterans on the Raiders amassed their best season while he was on the team. For example, Rich Gannon, an NFL veteran quarterback since 1987, made his first four Pro Bowl appearances with Wheatley in the backfield The team only compiled an 8–8 record, however.

Wheatley had the best season of his career in the 2000 as the Raiders went 12–4 and reached the American Football Conference championship game of the 2000–01 NFL playoffs. Wheatley amassed 1,046 yards rushing and 9 touchdowns on 232 carries and added 20 receptions for 156 yards. Wheatley combined effectively with Kaufman to form an inside and outside attacking combination in these first two years. Wheatley's 4.5 yards per carry ranked ninth in the NFL. Not only did Wheatley amass a career-high three 100-yard rushing games that season, but he also had his three highest career single-game performances: 156 yards on only 15 carries on October 22 at home against the Seattle Seahawks, 146 yards on December 16 at Seattle and 112 yards on November 5 against the Kansas City Chiefs. The 100-yard performances against Seattle were his second and third in his first four games against them as a Raider. In the playoffs, Wheatley only posted a total of 63 yards rushing on 31 carries and one reception for four yards in two home playoff games. On January 6, 2001, Wheatley posted what would turn out to be his career (seven career games) playoff high 56 yards rushing and his only playoff touchdown. In the January 14 conference championship against the Baltimore Ravens he only rushed for 7 yards on 12 carries.

In 2001, with the arrival of Jerry Rice and Charlie Garner, the offense focused on the passing game, running five more pass attempts per game than the year before. The team produced two 1,000-yard receivers with Rice amassing 1,139 yards and Tim Brown totaling 1,165 yards. Garner led the team in rushing and accumulated 72 receptions. Meanwhile, Wheatley only started three games and accumulated only 12 receptions over the course of the season. For the first time as a Raider, Wheatley went an entire season without a 100-yard rushing game. The team went 10–6 and returned to the 2001–02 NFL playoffs, but Wheatley only had 88 carries during the regular season despite tying Zack Crockett for the running back leadership with 6 touchdowns. In the first round wild card game, Wheatley posted his second highest playoff total of 37 yards. In Wheatley's first and only career road playoff game, he only posted five yards rushing on four carries.

==== Bill Callahan era (2002–2003) ====
Under new coach Bill Callahan, the 2002 Raiders became more reliant on Garner as the primary running back. Again, Rice and Brown were primary targets for Gannon who, while having his best season with 4,689 yards, did not use Wheatley as a receiver as much as other players. Wheatley had more carries than in 2001, but did not start a single game and did not see the end zone often. Again, Wheatley went an entire season without a 100-yard rushing game. However, as a role player he was able to play in three 2002–03 playoff games including the 2003 Super Bowl against former coach Gruden. As in his previous seasons, Wheatley posted his best playoff numbers in his first game, this time 30 yards on only four carries. A week later on January 19, 2003, Wheatley had his final post-season carry, a 5-yard run on his only carry of the game. In Super Bowl XXXVII on January 26, Wheatley's only touch came on a seven-yard reception. Although the Raiders did not win the Super Bowl, Tyrone Wheatley was re-signed.

In 2003, Wheatley reclaimed his role as the Raiders' leading rusher although Garner, the second leading rusher, continued to be the target of more passes and Crockett made it to the end zone as a rusher as often as Wheatley and Garner combined. Wheatley became the sixth person to lead the Raiders franchise in rushing yards three times (Clem Daniels, Marv Hubbard, Mark van Eeghen, Marcus Allen, Napoleon Kaufman). The 2003 Raiders fell to 4–12 and had no 1,000-yard receivers or runners. Wheatley's only 100-yard rushing game came on November 16 at home against the Minnesota Vikings.

Wheatley's name and those of several of his teammates were found on the list of clients of the Bay Area Laboratory Co-operative (BALCO) that had given performance-enhancing drugs to Marion Jones and others. As a result, he, and teammates Chris Hetherington, Dana Stubblefield, and Chris Cooper were called to testify before a 2003 federal grand jury investigating a laboratory that produces nutritional supplements. Johnnie Morton was called before the same jury. Wheatley, Stubblefield, and Morton all declined to comment. This court appearance in the BALCO hearings was notable for Wheatley's assault of a freelance photographer who attempted to take Wheatley's photo outside the Philip Burton Federal Building just after Wheatley had informed the KNTV cameraman that he would sue anyone who took his picture.

==== Norv Turner era (2004) ====
Although Wheatley's 2003 performance had been modest compared with the other seasons that he led the Raiders in rushing (1999, 2000), it was sufficient to convince the Raiders that they did not need to re-sign the pass catching running back Charlie Garner for the 2004 season with the new coach Norv Turner. The 2004 Raiders used a platoon of five runners (Wheatley, Crockett, Justin Fargas, J. R. Redmond and Amos Zereoué) who all rushed for between 100 and 500 yards and caught between 10 and 40 passes. Wheatley compiled his final 100-yard rushing game on September 26 in week 3 of the season at home against the Tampa Bay Buccaneers with 102 yards on 18 carries. This was the earliest point in the season Wheatley had rushed for 100 yards in a game as a professional. Wheatley's career ended in week 12 of the season on November 28, 2004, in a 25–24 win over the Denver Broncos with an injury that was first described as an injured hamstring. The hamstring tear turned out to be acute. Wheatley had been under contract until 2009 with a 2005 base salary of $800,000 and a 2006 base salary of $2 million.

== Coaching career ==
Unable to adequately rehabilitate his hamstring, Wheatley retired from the NFL and returned to Ann Arbor, Michigan. At the University of Michigan, in 2005, he volunteered as a track coach while finishing his bachelor's degree in sport management. In November 2006, Wheatley was hired at his alma mater, Robichaud High School, as the track coach. After taking Robichaud to their first conference title he was also hired as the football coach. To prepare for his coaching duties he partook in Jon Gruden's NFL minority coaching internship by working with the Tampa Bay Buccaneers as an NFL Minority coaching fellow during the 2006 training camp. As football coach in 2007, Wheatley started with a 6–1 record before facing the team's rival, the undefeated Inkster High School. Despite losing on the field to Inkster, the team was credited with a forfeit victory and compiled an 8–1 regular season record. The team achieved its first berth in 13 years in the MHSAA Class B playoffs, one year after going 0–9. The team won its first round playoff match against Dearborn Heights Annapolis High School and lost its second to Milan High School to finish with a 9–2 record. The team last won the MHSAA title in 1990 during Wheatley's senior season with a 12–1 record. During Wheatley's absence the team was a state semifinalist in 1991 with a 10–2 record and made a playoff appearance in 1994. In addition to coaching, Wheatley has worked as an athletic trainer to about 30 clients.

In 2008, he joined John Fontes coaching staff as an assistant coach for Team Michigan in the All American Football League. He was to serve as the running backs coach for the team in the league that planned to begin play in April 2008. However, the league never materialized. Wheatley interned as an NFL Minority coaching fellow with the Pittsburgh Steelers during the summer of 2008 training camp. He also served at the Rising Stars Football Camp as an assistant instructor. In late August 2008, he became the assistant coach at Ohio Northern University, with responsibility for the team's running backs. After the end of Wheatley's coaching internship at the conclusion of the season, he was hired by Ron English as a running backs coach at Eastern Michigan University for the 2009 season.

In February 2010, he was hired to replace Roger Harriott on Doug Marrone's staff at Syracuse University. In 2013, he left Syracuse, along with Marrone, to join the Buffalo Bills, Wheatley's first NFL coaching position.

In 2015, Tyrone decided to return to his alma mater and coach the running backs at the University of Michigan on the staff for the new Michigan head coach Jim Harbaugh.

In January 2017, the Jacksonville Jaguars hired Wheatley as running backs coach to rejoin Marrone, who was hired as Jaguars' head coach. Wheatley along with several other assistant coaches and coordinators were fired by Marrone and the Jaguars after the 2018 season. On February 6, 2019, Wheatley was named head coach of Morgan State Bears football.

Following the 2021 season, Wheatley rejoined the NFL coaching ranks as the running backs coach for new Denver Broncos head coach, Nathaniel Hackett.

Wheatley was named head football coach at Wayne State University in Detroit on January 26, 2023. Wheatley resigned from his position at Wayne State on February 10, 2026 after an 0–11 season.

On February 16, 2026, Wheatley was named running backs coach for Illinois.

== Personal life ==
In addition to his guardianships, Wheatley and Kimberly have three sons and two daughters as of February 2010. Wheatley and his wife Kimberly, had their first child, Tyrone Jr., in 1997, and their second in late 1998. In 2012, Wheatley was selected for induction into the Michigan Sports Hall of Fame.

On February 4, 2015, Tyrone Jr. (known as TJ) signed the National Letter of Intent to play football for his father's alma mater, Michigan. Prior to Michigan's hiring of Jim Harbaugh as coach and Wheatley on his staff, TJ had been deciding between UCLA, USC, Alabama, and Oregon.

On December 11, 2016, Tyrone's son, Terius committed to play football for the Virginia Tech Hokies, joining the 2017 signing class, after spending a year at Fork Union Military Academy.

== Career statistics ==
=== NFL ===
| Year | Team | GP | Rushing | | | | Receiving | | | |
| Year | Team | GP | Att | Yds | Avg | TD | Rec | Yds | Avg | TD |
|---|---|---|---|---|---|---|---|---|---|---|
| 1995 | NYG | 13 | 78 | 245 | 3.1 | 3 | 5 | 27 | 5.4 | 0 |
| 1996 | NYG | 14 | 112 | 400 | 3.6 | 1 | 12 | 51 | 4.2 | 2 |
| 1997 | NYG | 14 | 152 | 583 | 3.8 | 4 | 16 | 140 | 8.8 | 0 |
| 1998 | NYG | 4 | 14 | 52 | 3.7 | 0 | 0 | 0 | 0.0 | 0 |
| 1999 | OAK | 16 | 242 | 936 | 3.9 | 8 | 21 | 196 | 9.3 | 3 |
| 2000 | OAK | 14 | 232 | 1,046 | 4.5 | 9 | 20 | 156 | 7.8 | 1 |
| 2001 | OAK | 12 | 88 | 276 | 3.1 | 5 | 12 | 61 | 5.1 | 1 |
| 2002 | OAK | 14 | 108 | 429 | 3.9 | 2 | 12 | 71 | 5.9 | 0 |
| 2003 | OAK | 15 | 159 | 678 | 4.3 | 4 | 12 | 120 | 10.0 | 0 |
| 2004 | OAK | 8 | 85 | 327 | 3.8 | 4 | 15 | 78 | 5.2 | 0 |
| Career | | 124 | 1,270 | 4,962 | 3.9 | 40 | 125 | 900 | 7.2 | 7 |

=== College ===
| Year | Team | GP | Rushing | | | | Receiving | | | |
| Year | Team | GP | Att | Yds | Avg | TD | Rec | Yds | Avg | TD |
|---|---|---|---|---|---|---|---|---|---|---|
| 1991 | Michigan | 10 | 86 | 548 | 6.4 | 9 | 10 | 90 | 9.0 | 0 |
| 1992 | Michigan | 11 | 185 | 1,357 | 7.3 | 13 | 13 | 145 | 11.2 | 3 |
| 1993 | Michigan | 10 | 207 | 1,129 | 5.5 | 13 | 14 | 152 | 10.9 | 1 |
| 1994 | Michigan | 10 | 210 | 1,144 | 5.4 | 12 | 14 | 123 | 8.8 | 2 |
| Total | | 41 | 688 | 4,187 | 6.1 | 47 | 51 | 510 | 10 | 6 |

== Head coaching record ==
=== College ===
| Year | Team | Overall | Conference | Standing | Bowl/playoffs |
|---|---|---|---|---|---|
Morgan State Bears (Mid-Eastern Athletic Conference) (2019–2021)
| 2019 | Morgan State | 3–9 | 2–6 | T–7th | |
| 2020–21 | No team—COVID-19 | | | | |
| 2021 | Morgan State | 2–9 | 1–4 | 6th | |
| Morgan State: | | 5–18 | 3–10 | | |
Wayne State Warriors (Great Lakes Intercollegiate Athletic Conference) (2023–2025)
| 2023 | Wayne State | 3–8 | 2–4 | 5th | |
| 2024 | Wayne State | 2–9 | 2–5 | 6th | |
| 2025 | Wayne State | 0–11 | 0–7 | 8th | |
| Wayne State: | | 5–28 | 4–16 | | |
| Total: | | 10–46 | | | |

== See also ==
- Lists of Michigan Wolverines football rushing leaders
