= 2002 Kansas City Chiefs season =

NFL team season

- Owner: Lamar Hunt
- General manager: Carl Peterson
- Head coach: Dick Vermeil
- Home stadium: Arrowhead Stadium

Results
- Record: 8–8
- Division place: 4th AFC West
- Playoffs: Did not qualify
- All-Pros: 5: TE Tony Gonzalez (2nd team); KR Dante Hall (2nd team); RB Priest Holmes (1st team); T Willie Roaf (2nd team); G Will Shields (1st team)
- Pro Bowlers: 5: TE Tony Gonzalez; KR Dante Hall; RB Priest Holmes; T Willie Roaf; G Will Shields

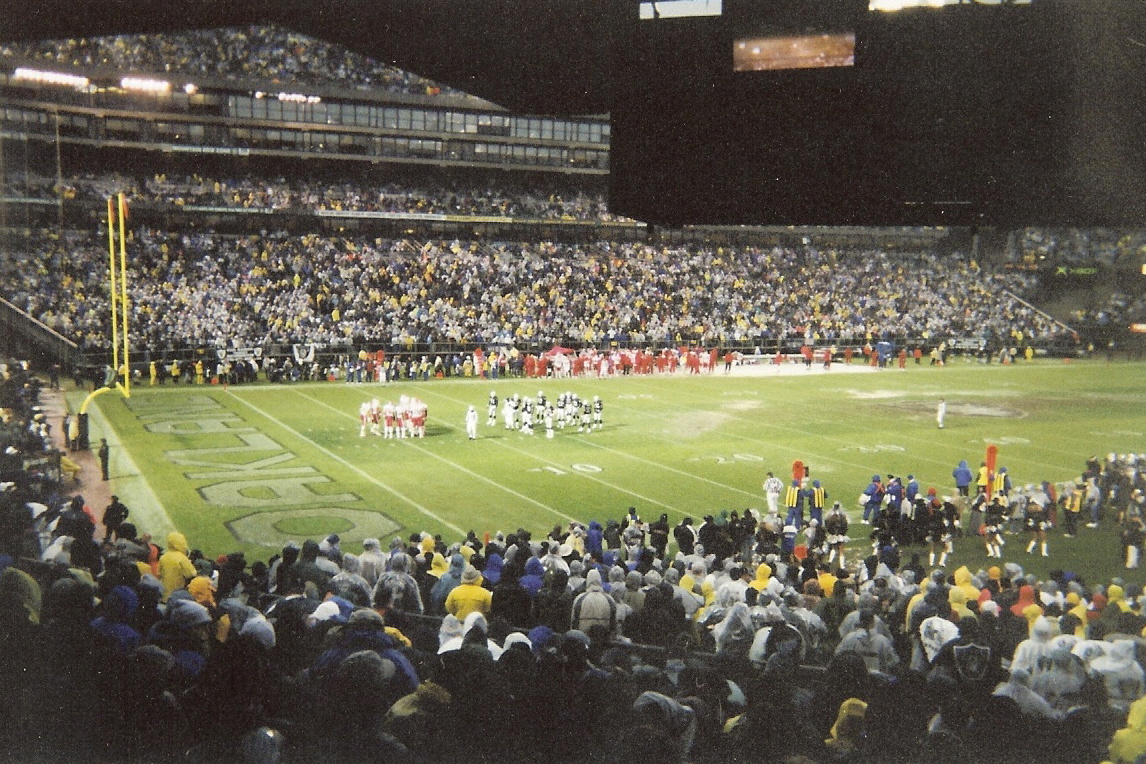
Kansas City at Oakland, 2002

The 2002 season was the Kansas City Chiefs' 33rd in the National Football League (NFL), their 43rd overall and the franchise's 40th in Kansas City, Missouri.

In their second season under head coach Dick Vermeil, the Chiefs's high-powered offense was led by quarterback Trent Green and 2002 NFL Offensive Player of the Year Priest Holmes, who was named to the NFL All-Pro team for the second of three years in a row. Green had a 2-to-1 touchdown-to-interception ratio (26 to 13) and Holmes led the league in touchdowns (24) and overall scoring (144 points).

Kansas City scored 467 points (29.2 per game), but gave up 399 points (24.9 per game), the second most in the AFC and fifth-most in the NFL. Football Outsiders stated that the 2002 Chiefs have the second-largest Offense-Defense imbalance from 1992 to 2010 (the largest discrepancy coming from the 1992 Seattle Seahawks). Football Outsiders also calculated that the Chiefs had the second most efficient running game in the same period (second only to the 2000 St. Louis Rams).

The Chiefs' offense also set two new NFL records with the fewest fumbles in a season (7, broken in 2010) and fewest fumbles lost in a season (2), the latter of which still stands. Additionally, Trent Green and Marc Boerigter in the Chiefs week 16 game against the Chargers, tied the record for longest pass play in NFL history, becoming the ninth occurrence of a 99-yard pass play.

== Offseason ==
Additions	Subtractions
QB Jonathan Quinn (Jaguars)	LB Donnie Edwards (Chargers)
K Morten Andersen (Giants)	K Todd Peterson (Steelers)
WR Johnnie Morton (Lions)	TE Mikhael Ricks (Lions)
T Willie Roaf (Saints)	CB Bracy Walker (Lions)
	T Victor Riley (Saints)
	WR Derrick Alexander (Vikings)

=== Draft ===
2002 Kansas City Chiefs draft
Round	Pick	Player	Position	College	Notes
1	6	Ryan Sims	Defensive tackle	North Carolina	
2	43	Eddie Freeman	Defensive tackle	UAB	
4	107	Omar Easy	Fullback	Penn State	
5	143	Scott Fujita	Linebacker	California	
7	221	Maurice Rodriguez	Linebacker	Fresno State	
Made roster * Made at least one Pro Bowl during career

=== Undrafted free agents ===
2002 undrafted free agents of note
Player	Position	College
Jason Baggett	Tackle	LSU
Dwayne Blakley	Tight end	Missouri
Tramaine Bingham	Defensive End	Ouachita Baptist
Marc Boerigter	Wide Receiver	Hastings
Aaron Crittendon	Tackle	Missouri
Clint Finley	Safety	Nebraska
Chad Hayes	Tight end	Maine
Gary Hobbs	Tackle	Arkansas
Jarmar Julien	Running back	San Jose State
Michael Landry	Defensive End	Southern
Brandon Ludwig	Guard/Center	California
Shawn Lynch	Center	Duke
Tony Newson	Linebacker	Utah State
Pete Rebstock	Wide receiver	Colorado State
Harold Robertson	Linebacker	Texas A&M
Kirk Rogers	Wide receiver	Hardin–Simmons
Adam Wulfeck	Punter	Cincinnati

== Personnel ==
=== Staff / Coaches ===
2002 Kansas City Chiefs staff
Front office: Founder – Lamar Hunt; President/general manager/chief executive officer – Carl Peterson; Chairman of the board – Jack Steadman; Vice chairman of the board – Clark Hunt; Executive vice president/assistant general manager – Dennis Thum; Vice president of football operations/player personnel – Lynn Stiles; Director of football administration – Mike White; Director of pro personnel – Bill Kuharich; Head coaches: Head coach – Dick Vermeil; Assistant head coach/offensive coordinator – Al Saunders; Offensive coaches: Quarterbacks – Terry Shea; Running backs – James Saxon; Wide receivers – Charlie Joiner; Tight ends – Keith Rowen; Offensive line – Mike Solari; Assistant offensive line – Irv Eatman; Offensive assistant/quality control – Jason Verduzco; Offensive quality control – Bob Saunders	Defensive coaches: Defensive coordinator – Greg Robinson; Defensive line – Carl Hairston; Defensive line – Bob Karmelowicz; Linebackers – Joe Vitt; Defensive backs – Peter Giunta; Defensive assistant/quality control – Darvin Wallis; Special teams coaches: Special teams – Frank Gansz Jr; Assistant special teams – Thomas McGaughey; Strength and conditioning: Strength and conditioning – Jeff Hurd; Assistant strength and conditioning – Billy Long

=== Roster ===
2002 Kansas City Chiefs roster
Quarterbacks (QB): 15 Todd Collins; 10 Trent Green; 12 Jonathan Quinn; Running backs (RB): 23 Derrick Blaylock; 34 Mike Cloud; 43 Omar Easy FB; 31 Priest Holmes; 27 Jarmar Julien; Wide receivers (WR): 85 Marc Boerigter; 82 Dante Hall; 87 Eddie Kennison; 81 Snoop Minnis; 80 Johnnie Morton; Tight ends (TE): 45 Billy Baber; 89 Jason Dunn; 88 Tony Gonzalez	Offensive linemen (OL): 72 Darnell Alford T; 67 Jason Andersen C/G; 77 Willie Roaf T; 68 Will Shields G; 70 Marcus Spears G/T; 76 John Tait T; 54 Brian Waters G; 62 Casey Wiegmann C; 60 Donald Willis G; Defensive linemen (DL): 93 John Browning DT; 99 Duane Clemons DE; 92 Eric Downing DT; 71 Eddie Freeman DE/DT; 98 Eric Hicks DE; 94 Nate Hobgood-Chittick DT; 95 Derrick Ransom DT; 55 Gary Stills DE; 91 R-Kal Truluck DE	Linebackers (LB): 96 Monty Beisel MLB; 56 Lewis Bush OLB; 51 Scott Fujita OLB; 57 Mike Maslowski OLB; 97 Tony Newson OLB; 53 Marvcus Patton MLB; Defensive backs (DB): 26 Taje Allen CB; 24 William Bartee CB; 29 Jason Belser FS; 39 Ray Crockett CB; 38 Clint Finley FS; 40 Corey Harris CB; 42 Shaunard Harts S; 44 Eric Warfield CB; 25 Greg Wesley SS; 30 Lyle West SS; Special teams (ST): 83 Kendall Gammon LS; 7 Michael Husted K; 4 Dan Stryzinski P	Practice squad: 64 T. J. Bingham DE; 47 Dwayne Blakley TE; 74 Michael Landry DE; 13 Kirk Rogers WR; 79 Mitch White T; Reserve: 69 Victor Allotey G (IR); 8 Morten Andersen K (IR); 50 Larry Atkins LB (IR); 59 Glenn Cadrez LB (IR); 52 Quinton Caver LB (IR); 75 Willie Jones T (IR); 22 Central McClellion CB (PUP); 84 Sylvester Morris WR (IR); 6 Pete Rebstock WR (IR); 49 Tony Richardson FB (IR); 90 Ryan Sims DT (IR); 65 Jabbar Threats DE (IR); 21 Jerome Woods S (IR); Rookies in italics 53 active, 13 reserve, 5 practice squad

== Preseason ==
=== Schedule ===
Week	Date	Opponent	Result	Record	Venue	Recap
1	August 10	at San Francisco 49ers	W 17–14 (OT)	1–0	3Com Park	Recap
2	August 17	Houston Texans	W 19–9	2–0	Arrowhead Stadium	Recap
3	August 24	at Seattle Seahawks	L 14–17	2–1	Seahawks Stadium	Recap
4	August 30	St. Louis Rams	W 23–16	3–1	Arrowhead Stadium	Recap

=== Game summaries ===
==== Week 1: at San Francisco 49ers ====
Week 1: Kansas City Chiefs (0–0) at San Francisco 49ers (0–0) – Game summary

Quarter	1	2	3	4	OT	Total
Chiefs	7	0	7	0	3	17
49ers	7	0	7	0	0	14

at 3Com Park, San Francisco, California

- Date: August 10
- Game time: 8:00 p.m. CDT/6:00 p.m. PDT
- Game weather: 72 °F (22 °C)
- Game attendance: 63,111
- Referee: Bill Leavy
- Recap, Game Book

Game information

First quarter

- KC – Dante Hall 4-yard pass from Trent Green (Lawrence Tynes kick), 10:12. Chiefs 7–0. Drive: 10 plays, 66 yards, 4:48.
- SF – Terrell Owens 71-yard pass from Jeff Garcia (Jeff Chandler kick), 9:25. Tied 7–7. Drive: 3 plays, 75 yards, 0:47.

Second quarter

- No scoring plays.

Third quarter

- KC – Josh Roth 5-yard pass from Jonathan Quinn (Lawrence Tynes kick), 7:03. Chiefs 14–7. Drive: 4 plays, 30 yards, 1:51.
- SF – Cedrick Wilson 5-yard pass from Tim Rattay (José Cortez kick), 2:17. Tied 14–14. Drive: 9 plays, 71 yards, 4:46.

Fourth quarter

- No scoring plays.

Overtime

- KC – Lawrence Tynes 29-yard field goal, 12:35. Chiefs 17–14. Drive: 1 play, 0 yards, 0:04.

Top passers

- KC – Todd Collins – 9/16, 83 yards
- SF – Tim Rattay – 10/19, 132 yards, TD, 2 INT

Top rushers

- KC – Jarmar Julien – 5 rushes, 28 yards
- SF – Saladin McCullough – 8 rushes, 40 yards

Top receivers

- KC – Dante Hall – 8 receptions, 64 yards, TD
- SF – Terrell Owens – 1 reception, 71 yards, TD

==== Week 2: vs. Houston Texans ====
Week 2: Houston Texans at Kansas City Chiefs – Game summary

Quarter	1	2	3	4	Total
Texans	3	3	0	3	9
Chiefs	7	6	6	0	19

at Arrowhead Stadium, Kansas City, Missouri

- Date: August 17
- Game time: 7:30 p.m. CDT
- Game weather: Mostly cloudy, 74 °F (23 °C)
- Game attendance: 73,506
- Referee: Ron Blum
- Recap, Game Book

Game information

First quarter

- KC – Priest Holmes 10-yard run (Morten Andersen kick), 5:10. Chiefs 7–0. Drive: 11 plays, 64 yards, 5:46.
- HOU – Kris Brown 30-yard field goal, 2:25. Chiefs 7–3. Drive: 6 plays, 58 yards, 2:45.

Second quarter

- KC – Morten Andersen 44-yard field goal, 13:25. Chiefs 10–3. Drive: 10 plays, 54 yards, 4:00.
- HOU – Kris Brown 32-yard field goal, 1:33. Chiefs 10–6. Drive: 14 plays, 55 yards, 6:06.
- KC – Morten Andersen 32-yard field goal, 0:06. Chiefs 13–6. Drive: 11 plays, 48 yards, 1:27.

Third quarter

- KC – Morten Andersen 32-yard field goal, 10:34. Chiefs 16–6. Drive: 8 plays, 31 yards, 4:26.
- KC – Morten Andersen 37-yard field goal, 7:03. Chiefs 19–6. Drive: 6 plays, 18 yards, 2:07.

Fourth quarter

- HOU – Kris Brown 26-yard field goal, 8:40. Chiefs 19–9. Drive: 4 plays, 1 yard, 1:33.

Top passers

- HOU – David Carr – 8/15, 123 yards
- KC – Jonathan Quinn – 8/15, 82 yards, 2 INT

Top rushers

- HOU – [Jonathan Wells – 16 rushes, 63 yards
- KC – Frank Moreau – 7 rushes, 21 yards

Top receivers

- HOU – Atnaf Harris – 2 receptions, 45 yards
- KC – Curtis Jackson – 4 receptions, 45 yards

==== Week 3: at Seattle Seahawks ====
Week 3: Kansas City Chiefs at Seattle Seahawks – Game summary

Quarter	1	2	3	4	Total
Chiefs	0	0	7	7	14
Seahawks	0	10	0	7	17

at Seahawks Stadium, Seattle, Washington

- Date: August 24
- Game time: 9:00 p.m. CDT/7:00 p.m. PDT
- Game weather: Sunny, 79 °F (26 °C)
- Game attendance: 49,036
- Referee: Ed Hochuli
- Recap, Game Book

Game information

First quarter

- No scoring plays.

Second quarter

- SEA – Rian Lindell 40-yard field goal, 10:18. Seahawks 3–0. Drive: 6 plays, 18 yards, 2:03.
- SEA – Darrell Jackson 8-yard pass from Matt Hasselbeck (Rian Lindell kick), 4:51. Seahawks 10–0. Drive: 7 plays, 38 yards, 4:16.

Third quarter

- KC – Derrick Blaylock 3-yard run (Morten Andersen kick), 6:20. Seahawks 10–7. Drive: 14 plays, 80 yards, 7:09.

Fourth quarter

- SEA – Rod Phillips 1-yard run (Rian Lindell kick), 11:31. Seahawks 17–7. Drive: 6 plays, 53 yards, 3:11.
- KC – Ryan Collins 1-yard pass from Todd Collins (Morten Andersen kick), 5:15. Seahawks 17–14. Drive: 9 plays, 64 yards, 4:06.

Top passers

- KC – Trent Green – 9/20, 86 yards, 3 INT
- SEA – Matt Hasselbeck – 8/13, 74 yards, TD

Top rushers

- KC – Derrick Blaylock – 13 rushes, 50 yards, TD
- SEA – Rod Phillips – 19 rushes, 65 yards, TD

Top receivers

- KC – Dante Hall – 2 receptions, 50 yards
- SEA – Darrell Jackson – 4 receptions, 39 yards, TD

==== Week 4: vs. St. Louis Rams ====
Week 4: St. Louis Rams at Kansas City Chiefs – Game summary

Quarter	1	2	3	4	Total
Rams	6	10	0	0	16
Chiefs	0	3	10	10	23

at Arrowhead Stadium, Kansas City, Missouri

- Date: August 30
- Game time: 7:30 p.m. CDT
- Game weather: Clear, 79 °F (26 °C)
- Game attendance: 73,410
- Referee: Jeff Triplette
- Recap, Game Book

Game information

First quarter

- STL – Jeff Wilkins 20-yard field goal, 10:01. Rams 3–0. Drive: 9 plays, 72 yards, 4:59.
- STL – Jeff Wilkins 20-yard field goal, 0:00. Rams 6–0. Drive: 10 plays, 71 yards, 4:16.

Second quarter

- STL – Jeff Wilkins 40-yard field goal, 8:39. Rams 9–0. Drive: 9 plays, 33 yards, 3:26.
- STL – Torry Holt 10-yard pass from Kurt Warner (Jeff Wilkins kick), 2:22. Rams 16–0. Drive: 9 plays, 61 yards, 4:12.
- KC – Morten Andersen 39-yard field goal, 0:00. Rams 16–3. Drive: 2 plays, 34 yards, 0:18.

Third quarter

- KC – Morten Andersen 26-yard field goal, 7:02. Rams 16–6. Drive: 13 plays, 46 yards, 7:58.
- KC – Dante Hall 46-yard pass from Todd Collins (Morten Andersen kick), 4:54. Rams 16–13. Drive: 2 plays, 46 yards, 0:13.

Fourth quarter

- KC – Derrick Blaylock 3-yard pass from Todd Collins (Morten Andersen kick), 10:27. Chiefs 20–16. Drive: 13 plays, 58 yards, 7:19.
- KC – Morten Andersen 30-yard field goal, 5:08. Chiefs 23–16. Drive: 5 plays, 43 yards, 1:48.

Top passers

- STL – Kurt Warner – 17/27, 213 yards, TD
- KC – Todd Collins – 12/16, 131 yards, 2 TD

Top rushers

- STL – Marshall Faulk – 11 rushes, 50 yards
- KC – Derrick Blaylock – 5 rushes, 60 yards

Top receivers

- STL – Francis St. Paul – 4 receptions, 66 yards
- KC – Dante Hall – 1 reception, 46 yards, TD

== Regular season ==
In the 2002 season, the Chiefs' non-divisional, conference opponents were primarily from the AFC East. The Cleveland Browns were from the AFC North and the Jacksonville Jaguars were from the AFC South. Their non-conference opponents were from the NFC West.

=== Schedule ===
Week	Date	Opponent	Result	Record	Venue	Recap
1	September 8	at Cleveland Browns	**W** 40–39	1–0	Cleveland Browns Stadium	Recap
2	September 15	Jacksonville Jaguars	**L** 16–23	1–1	Arrowhead Stadium	Recap
3	September 22	at New England Patriots	**L** 38–41 (OT)	1–2	Gillette Stadium	Recap
4	September 29	Miami Dolphins	**W** 48–30	2–2	Arrowhead Stadium	Recap
5	October 6	at New York Jets	**W** 29–25	3–2	Giants Stadium	Recap
6	October 13	at **San Diego Chargers**	**L** 34–35	3–3	Qualcomm Stadium	Recap
7	October 20	**Denver Broncos**	**L** 34–37 (OT)	3–4	Arrowhead Stadium	Recap
8	October 27	**Oakland Raiders**	**W** 20–10	4–4	Arrowhead Stadium	Recap
9	Bye					
10	November 10	at San Francisco 49ers	**L** 13–17	4–5	3Com Park	Recap
11	November 17	Buffalo Bills	**W** 17–16	5–5	Arrowhead Stadium	Recap
12	November 24	at Seattle Seahawks	**L** 32–39	5–6	Seahawks Stadium	Recap
13	December 1	Arizona Cardinals	**W** 49–0	6–6	Arrowhead Stadium	Recap
14	December 8	St. Louis Rams	**W** 49–10	7–6	Arrowhead Stadium	Recap
15	December 15	at **Denver Broncos**	**L** 24–31	7–7	Invesco Field at Mile High	Recap
16	December 22	**San Diego Chargers**	**W** 24–22	8–7	Arrowhead Stadium	Recap
17	December 28	at **Oakland Raiders**	**L** 0–24	8–8	Network Associates Coliseum	Recap

Note: Intra-division opponents are in bold text.

=== Game summaries ===
==== Week 1: at Cleveland Browns ====
Week 1: Kansas City Chiefs (0–0) at Cleveland Browns (0–0) – Game summary

Quarter	1	2	3	4	Total
**Chiefs**	7	7	3	23	**40**
Browns	6	14	7	12	**39**

at Cleveland Browns Stadium, Cleveland, Ohio

- Date: September 8
- Game time: 1:00 p.m. EDT/12:00 p.m. CDT
- Game weather: Sunny, 86 °F (30 °C)
- Game attendance: 72,938
- Referee: Ron Blum
- TV announcers (CBS): Ian Eagle, Dan Dierdorf, and Bonnie Bernstein
- Recap, Game Book

Game information

**First quarter**

- CLE – Phil Dawson 20-yard field goal, 12:36. Browns 3–0. **Drive: 4 plays, 3 yards, 0:54.**
- KC – Tony Gonzalez 17-yard pass from Trent Green (Morten Andersen kick), 8:21. Chiefs 7–3. **Drive: 8 plays, 73 yards, 4:15.**
- CLE – Phil Dawson 32-yard field goal, 3:16. Chiefs 7–6. **Drive: 10 plays, 55 yards, 5:05.**

**Second quarter**

- CLE – Dennis Northcutt 43-yard pass from Kelly Holcomb (Phil Dawson kick), 12:19. Browns 13–7. **Drive: 2 plays, 65 yards, 0:48.**
- KC – Priest Holmes 5-yard run (Morten Andersen kick), 8:41. Chiefs 14–13. **Drive: 6 plays, 83 yards, 3:38.**
- CLE – Quincy Morgan 33-yard pass from Kevin Johnson (Phil Dawson kick), 5:38. Browns 20–14. **Drive: 5 plays, 71 yards, 3:03.**

**Third quarter**

- CLE – André Davis 4-yard pass from Kelly Holcomb (Phil Dawson kick), 7:09. Browns 27–14. **Drive: 14 plays, 80 yards, 7:51.**
- KC – Morten Andersen 33-yard field goal, 2:04. Browns 27–17. **Drive: 9 plays, 42 yards, 5:05.**

**Fourth quarter**

- CLE – Phil Dawson 34-yard field goal, 11:19. Browns 30–17. **Drive: 8 plays, 50 yards, 3:27.**
- KC – Priest Holmes 26-yard run (Morten Andersen kick), 9:06. Browns 30–24. **Drive: 4 plays, 56 yards, 2:13.**
- KC – Priest Holmes 15-yard run (Morten Anderson kick), 8:05. Chiefs 31–30. **Drive: 1 play, 15 yards, 0:07.**
- CLE – Quincy Morgan 44-yard pass from Kelly Holcomb (run failed), 5:52. Browns 36–31. **Drive: 5 plays, 66 yards, 2:13.**
- KC – Priest Holmes 7-yard run (run failed), 3:05. Chiefs 37–36. **Drive: 6 plays, 74 yards, 2:47.**
- CLE – Phil Dawson 41-yard field goal, 0:29. Browns 39–37. **Drive: 7 plays, 45 yards, 2:36.**
- KC – Morten Andersen 30-yard field goal, 0:00. Chiefs 40–39. **Drive: 4 plays, 53 yards, 0:29.**

**Top passers**

- KC – Trent Green – 20/29, 276 yards, TD, INT
- CLE – Kelly Holcomb – 27/39, 326 yards, 3 TD

**Top rushers**

- KC – Priest Holmes – 22 rushes, 122 yards, 4 TD
- CLE – Jamel White – 12 rushes, 42 yards

**Top receivers**

- KC – Eddie Kennison – 4 receptions, 120 yards
- CLE – Quincy Morgan – 9 receptions, 151 yards, 2 TD

==== Week 2: vs. Jacksonville Jaguars ====
Week 2: Jacksonville Jaguars (0–1) at Kansas City Chiefs (1–0) – Game summary

Quarter	1	2	3	4	Total
**Jaguars**	0	9	0	14	**23**
Chiefs	3	3	0	10	**16**

at Arrowhead Stadium, Kansas City, Missouri

- Date: September 15
- Game time: 12:00 p.m. CDT
- Game weather: Clear, 66 °F (19 °C)
- Game attendance: 77,934
- Referee: Tom White
- TV announcers (CBS): Don Criqui and Steve Tasker
- Recap, Game Book

Game information

**First quarter**

- KC – Morten Andersen 25-yard field goal, 2:49. Chiefs 3–0. **Drive: 15 plays, 88 yards, 8:38.**

**Second quarter**

- KC – Morten Andersen 38-yard field goal, 11:28. Chiefs 6–0. **Drive: 11 plays, 51 yards, 4:25.**
- JAX – Jimmy Smith 37-yard pass from Mark Brunell (kick aborted), 2:42. Tied 6–6. **Drive: 7 plays, 56 yards, 3:29.**
- JAX – Hayden Epstein 26-yard field goal, 0:00. Jaguars 9–6. **Drive: 11 plays, 46 yards, 1:45.**

**Third quarter**

- No scoring plays.

**Fourth quarter**

- KC – Morten Andersen 39-yard field goal, 6:57. Tied 9–9. **Drive: 8 plays, 34 yards, 2:53.**
- JAX – Patrick Johnson 79-yard pass from Mark Brunell (Hayden Epstein kick), 5:59. Jaguars 16–9. **Drive: 2 plays, 85 yards, 0:58.**
- JAX – Fred Taylor 63-yard run (Hayden Epstein kick), 3:09. Jaguars 23–9. **Drive: 1 play, 63 yards, 0:11.**
- KC – Tony Gonzalez 12-yard pass from Trent Green (Morten Andersen kick), 2:35. Jaguars 23–16. **Drive: 4 plays, 80 yards, 0:34.**

**Top passers**

- JAX – Mark Brunell – 25/36, 320 yards, 2 TD
- KC – Trent Green – 16/31, 199 yards, TD, 2 INT

**Top rushers**

- JAX – Fred Taylor – 20 rushes, 114 yards, TD
- KC – Priest Holmes – 22 rushes, 84 yards

**Top receivers**

- JAX – Patrick Johnson – 4 receptions, 97 yards, TD
- KC – Marc Boerigter – 1 reception, 51 yards

==== Week 3: at New England Patriots ====
Week 3: Kansas City Chiefs (1–1) at New England Patriots (2–0) – Game summary

Quarter	1	2	3	4	OT	Total
Chiefs	3	7	7	21	0	**38**
**Patriots**	0	9	8	21	3	**41**

at Gillette Stadium, Foxborough, Massachusetts

- Date: September 22
- Game time: 1:00 p.m. EDT/12:00 p.m. CDT
- Game weather: Warm and humid, 80 °F (27 °C)
- Game attendance: 68,436
- Referee: Bill Carollo
- TV announcers (CBS): Dick Enberg, Dan Dierdorf, and Bonnie Bernstein
- Recap, Game Book

Game information

**First quarter**

- KC – Morten Andersen 39-yard field goal, 2:15. Chiefs 3–0. **Drive: 9 plays, 37 yards, 4:36.**

**Second quarter**

- KC – Eddie Kennison 14-yard pass from Trent Green (Morten Andersen kick), 14:56. Chiefs 10–0. **Drive: 3 plays, 26 yards, 0:47.**
- NE – Kevin Faulk 23-yard pass from Tom Brady (run failed), 6:57. Chiefs 10–6. **Drive: 8 plays, 85 yards, 4:40.**
- NE – Adam Vinatieri 37-yard field goal, 0:05. Chiefs 10–9. **Drive: 6 plays, 22 yards, 0:51.**

**Third quarter**

- KC – Priest Holmes 3-yard pass from Trent Green (Morten Andersen kick), 13:00. Chiefs 17–9. **Drive: 4 plays, 37 yards, 2:00.**
- NE – Troy Brown 9-yard pass from Tom Brady (Antowain Smith run), 7:45. Tied 17–17. **Drive: 11 plays, 71 yards, 5:15.**

**Fourth quarter**

- NE – Daniel Graham 18-yard pass from Tom Brady (Adam Vinatieri kick), 14:55. Patriots 24–17. **Drive: 4 plays, 56 yards, 1:08.**
- NE – David Patten 38-yard pass from Tom Brady (Adam Vinatieri kick), 13:23. Patriots 31–17. **Drive: 3 plays, 39 yards, 1:24.**
- KC – Eddie Kennison 15-yard pass from Trent Green (Morten Andersen kick), 9:23. Patriots 31–24. **Drive: 8 plays, 62 yards, 4:00.**
- NE – Antowain Smith 42-yard run (Adam Vinatieri kick), 6:10. Patriots 38–24. **Drive: 6 plays, 75 yards, 3:13.**
- KC – Priest Holmes 6-yard run (Morten Andersen kick), 4:37. Patriots 38–31. **Drive: 6 plays, 59 yards, 1:33.**
- KC – Priest Holmes 1-yard run (Morten Anderson kick), 0:00. Tied 38–38. **Drive: 11 plays, 54 yards, 2:30.**

**Overtime**

- NE – Adam Vinatieri 35-yard field goal, 10:20. Patriots 41–38. **Drive: 9 plays, 53 yards, 4:40.**

**Top passers**

- KC – Trent Green – 16/25, 149 yards, 3 TD, 2 INT
- NE – Tom Brady – 39/54, 410 yards, 4 TD, INT

**Top rushers**

- KC – Priest Holmes – 30 rushes, 180 yards, 2 TD
- NE – Antowain Smith – 16 rushes, 92 yards, TD

**Top receivers**

- KC – Johnnie Morton – 2 receptions, 44 yards
- NE – Troy Brown – 16 receptions, 176 yards, TD

==== Week 4: vs. Miami Dolphins ====
Week 4: Miami Dolphins (3–0) at Kansas City Chiefs (1–2) – Game summary

Quarter	1	2	3	4	Total
Dolphins	7	9	7	7	**30**
**Chiefs**	10	14	7	17	**48**

at Arrowhead Stadium, Kansas City, Missouri

- Date: September 29
- Game time: 12:00 p.m. CDT
- Game weather: Partly cloudy, 76 °F (24 °C)
- Game attendance: 78,178
- Referee: Ed Hochuli
- TV announcers (CBS): Kevin Harlan, Randy Cross and Beasley Reece
- Recap, Game Book

Game information

**First quarter**

- MIA – Jay Fiedler 1-yard run (Olindo Mare kick), 13:07. Dolphins 7–0. **Drive: 4 plays, 52 yards, 1:53.**
- KC – Tony Gonzalez 9-yard pass from Trent Green (Morten Andersen kick), 6:53. Tied 7–7. **Drive: 11 plays, 83 yards, 6:14.**
- KC – Morten Andersen 50-yard field goal, 5:37. Chiefs 10–7. **Drive: 4 plays, 4 yards, 1:01.**

**Second quarter**

- MIA – Olindo Mare 42-yard field goal, 14:21. Tied 10–10. **Drive: 12 plays, 56 yards, 6:16.**
- KC – Priest Holmes 25-yard run (Morten Andersen kick), 12:37. Chiefs 17–10. **Drive: 4 plays, 69 yards, 1:44.**
- KC – Johnnie Morton 8-yard pass from Trent Green (Morten Andersen kick), 9:23. Chiefs 24–10. **Drive: 4 plays, 58 yards, 1:32.**
- MIA – Olindo Mare 29-yard field goal, 3:39. Chiefs 24–13. **Drive: 7 plays, 46 yards, 2:38.**
- MIA – Olindo Mare 25-yard field goal, 0:00. Chiefs 24–16. **Drive: 9 plays, 49 yards, 2:44.**

**Third quarter**

- KC – Tony Gonzalez 42-yard pass from Trent Green (Morten Andersen kick), 11:33. Chiefs 31–16. **Drive: 7 plays, 80 yards, 3:27.**
- MIA – Ricky Williams 3-yard run (Olindo Mare kick), 9:15. Chiefs 31–23. **Drive: 4 plays, 72 yards, 2:18.**

**Fourth quarter**

- KC – Tony Gonzalez 6-yard pass from Trent Green (Morten Andersen kick), 13:40. Chiefs 38–23. **Drive: 8 plays, 61 yards, 4:35.**
- MIA – Rob Konrad 6-yard pass from Jay Fiedler (Olindo Mare kick), 11:30. Chiefs 38–30. **Drive: 5 plays, 63 yards, 2:10.**
- KC – Morten Andersen 24-yard field goal, 7:33. Chiefs 41–30. **Drive: 4 plays, 9 yards, 2:04.**
- KC – Billy Baber 3-yard pass from Trent Green (Morten Andersen kick), 5:48. Chiefs 48–30. **Drive: 2 plays, 20 yards, 0:51.**

**Top passers**

- MIA – Jay Fiedler – 29/45, 310 yards, TD, 4 INT
- KC – Trent Green – 24/34, 328 yards, 5 TD

**Top rushers**

- MIA – Ricky Williams – 14 rushes, 66 yards, TD
- KC – Priest Holmes – 23 rushes, 52 yards, TD

**Top receivers**

- MIA – Chris Chambers – 6 receptions, 102 yards
- KC – Tony Gonzalez – 7 receptions, 140 yards, 3 TD

==== Week 5: at New York Jets ====
Week 5: Kansas City Chiefs (2–2) at New York Jets (1–3) – Game summary

Quarter	1	2	3	4	Total
**Chiefs**	3	9	3	14	**29**
Jets	7	8	0	10	**25**

at Giants Stadium, East Rutherford, New Jersey

- Date: October 6
- Game time: 4:05 p.m. EDT/3:05 p.m. CDT
- Game weather: Partly cloudy, 66 °F (19 °C)
- Game attendance: 78,149
- Referee: Johnny Grier
- TV announcers (CBS): Dick Enberg, Dan Dierdorf, and Bonnie Bernstein
- Recap, Game Book

Game information

**First quarter**

- KC – Morten Anderson 36-yard field goal, 7:18. Chiefs 3–0. **Drive: 7 plays, 23 yards, 3:20.**
- NYJ – Curtis Martin 17-yard run (John Hall kick), 4:56. Jets 7–3. **Drive: 5 plays, 56 yards, 2:36.**

**Second quarter**

- KC – Morten Anderson 40-yard field goal, 9:00. Jets 7–6. **Drive: 12 plays, 58 yards, 6:48.**
- KC – Priest Holmes 12-yard run (pass failed), 1:46. Chiefs 12–7. **Drive: 9 plays, 80 yards, 4:35.**
- NYJ – Anthony Becht 2-yard pass from Chad Pennington (Curtis Martin run), 0:12. Jets 15–12. **Drive: 7 plays, 61 yards, 1:32.**

**Third quarter**

- KC – Morten Anderson 27-yard field goal, 11:11. Tied 15–15. **Drive: 8 plays, 58 yards, 3:54.**

**Fourth quarter**

- NYJ – Santana Moss 27-yard pass from Chad Pennington (John Hall kick), 13:43. Jets 22–15. **Drive: 12 plays, 89 yards, 5:36.**
- KC – Dante Hall 60-yard pass from Trent Green (Morten Anderson kick), 10:32. Tied 22–22. **Drive: 5 plays, 79 yards, 3:16.**
- NYJ – John Hall 25-yard field goal, 3:11. Jets 25–22. **Drive: 14 plays, 61 yards, 7:21.**
- KC – Priest Holmes 19-yard pass from Trent Green (Morten Anderson kick), 0:35. Chiefs 29–25. **Drive: 10 plays, 78 yards, 2:27.**

**Top passers**

- KC – Trent Green – 23/33, 296 yards, 2 TD, INT
- NYJ – Chad Pennington – 22/29, 237 yards, 2 TD, INT

**Top rushers**

- KC – Priest Holmes – 23 rushes, 152 yards, TD
- NYJ – Curtis Martin – 21 rushes, 119 yards, TD

**Top receivers**

- KC – Priest Holmes – 9 receptions, 81 yards, TD
- NYJ – Laveranues Coles – 8 receptions, 116 yards

==== Week 6: at San Diego Chargers ====
Week 6: Kansas City Chiefs (3–2) at San Diego Chargers (4–1) – Game summary

Quarter	1	2	3	4	Total
Chiefs	10	7	7	10	**34**
**Chargers**	7	0	7	21	**35**

at Qualcomm Stadium, San Diego, California

- Date: October 13
- Game time: 3:15 p.m. CDT/1:15 p.m. PDT
- Game weather: Clear, 61 °F (16 °C)
- Game attendance: 58,995
- Referee: Walt Coleman
- TV announcers (CBS): Craig Bolerjack, Craig James, and Scott Kaplan
- Recap, Game Book

Game information

**First quarter**

- SD – Tim Dwight 19-yard run (Steve Christie kick), 11:50. Chargers 7–0. **Drive: 5 plays, 66 yards, 2:00.**
- KC – Morten Andersen 28-yard field goal, 5:17. Chargers 7–3. **Drive: 11 plays, 60 yards, 6:33.**
- KC – Priest Holmes 1-yard run (Morten Andersen kick), 3:51. Chiefs 10–7. **Drive: 2 plays, 1 yard, 0:10.**

**Second quarter**

- KC – Marc Boerigter 44-yard pass from Trent Green (Morten Andersen kick), 2:00. Chiefs 17–7. **Drive: 6 plays, 91 yards, 3:13.**

**Third quarter**

- SD – LaDainian Tomlinson 1-yard run (Steve Christie kick), 5:58. Chiefs 17–14. **Drive: 2 plays, 9 yards, 0:45.**
- KC – Marc Boerigter 19-yard pass from Trent Green (Morten Andersen kick), 2:24. Chiefs 24–14. **Drive: 3 plays, 28 yards, 1:29.**

**Fourth quarter**

- SD – Curtis Conway 11-yard run (Steve Christie kick), 13:16. Chiefs 24–21. **Drive: 8 plays, 59 yards, 4:08.**
- KC – Tony Gonzalez 3-yard pass from Trent Green (Morten Andersen kick), 8:06. Chiefs 31–21. **Drive: 8 plays, 60 yards, 5:10.**
- SD – Tim Dwight 11-yard pass from Drew Brees (Steve Christie kick), 4:07. Chiefs 31–28. **Drive: 9 plays, 65 yards, 3:59.**
- KC – Morten Andersen 43-yard field goal, 2:30. Chiefs 34–28. **Drive: 7 plays, 38 yard, 1:37.**
- SD – Reche Caldwell 2-yard pass from Drew Brees (Steve Christie kick), 0:14. Chargers 35–34. **Drive: 7 plays, 71 yards, 2:16.**

**Top passers**

- KC – Trent Green – 17/29, 236 yards, 3 TD, 2 INT
- SD – Drew Brees – 28/41, 319 yards, 2 TD, 2 INT

**Top rushers**

- KC – Priest Holmes – 23 rushes, 63 yards, TD
- SD – LaDainian Tomlinson – 20 rushes, 78 yards, TD

**Top receivers**

- KC – Priest Holmes – 7 receptions, 96 yards
- SD – Curtis Conway – 8 receptions, 129 yards

==== Week 7: vs. Denver Broncos ====
Week 7: Denver Broncos (4–2) at Kansas City Chiefs (3–3) – Game summary

Quarter	1	2	3	4	OT	Total
**Broncos**	3	3	14	14	3	**37**
Chiefs	7	6	14	7	0	**34**

at Arrowhead Stadium, Kansas City, Missouri

- Date: October 20
- Game time: 12:00 p.m. CDT
- Game weather: Sunny, 51 °F (11 °C)
- Game attendance: 78,446
- Referee: Bill Leavy
- TV announcers (CBS): Kevin Harlan, Randy Cross, and Beasley Reece
- Recap, Game Book

Game information

**First quarter**

- KC – Priest Holmes 1-yard run (Morten Andersen kick), 9:24. Chiefs 7–0. **Drive: 9 plays, 66 yards, 5:36.**
- DEN – Jason Elam 32-yard field goal, 2:49. Chiefs 7–3. **Drive: 12 plays, 61 yards, 6:35.**

**Second quarter**

- KC – Morten Andersen 41-yard field goal, 9:31. Chiefs 10–3. **Drive: 11 plays, 32 yards, 3:52.**
- KC – Morten Andersen 32-yard field goal, 3:06. Chiefs 13–3. **Drive: 5 plays, 23 yard, 1:31.**
- DEN – Jason Elam 33-yard field goal, 0:07. Chiefs 13–6. **Drive: 11 plays, 52 yards, 2:59.**

**Third quarter**

- DEN – Shannon Sharpe 82-yard pass from Brian Griese (Jason Elam kick), 11:38. Tied 13–13. **Drive: 2 plays, 87 yards, 0:50.**
- KC – Tony Richardson 14-yard run (Morten Andersen kick), 8:28. Chiefs 20–13. **Drive: 5 plays, 44 yards, 3:10.**
- DEN – Clinton Portis 2-yard run (Jason Elam kick), 4:37. Tied 20–20. **Drive: 9 plays, 63 yards, 3:51.**
- KC – Priest Holmes 4-yard run (Morten Andersen kick), 0:37. Chiefs 27–20. **Drive: 9 plays, 70 yards, 4:00.**

**Fourth quarter**

- KC – Priest Holmes 1-yard run (Morten Andersen kick), 12:42. Chiefs 34–20. **Drive: 2 plays, 5 yards, 0:09.**
- DEN – Shannon Sharpe 28-yard pass from Brian Griese (Jason Elam kick), 10:51. Chiefs 34–27. **Drive: 4 plays, 70 yards, 1:51.**
- DEN – Mike Anderson 2-yard run (Jason Elam kick), 0:21. Tied 34–34. **Drive: 11 plays, 67 yards, 3:26.**

**Overtime**

- DEN – Jason Elam 25-yard field goal, 12:03. Broncos 37–34. **Drive: 3 plays, 25 yards, 0:42.**

**Top passers**

- DEN – Brian Griese – 30/50, 376 yards, 2 TD
- KC – Trent Green – 20/33, 172 yards

**Top rushers**

- DEN – Clinton Portis – 15 rushes, 70 yards, TD
- KC – Priest Holmes – 24 rushes, 113 yards, 3 TD

**Top receivers**

- DEN – Shannon Sharpe – 12 receptions, 214 yards, 2 TD
- KC – Tony Gonzalez – 5 receptions, 58 yards

==== Week 8: vs. Oakland Raiders ====
Week 8: Oakland Raiders (4–2) at Kansas City Chiefs (3–4) – Game summary

Quarter	1	2	3	4	Total
Raiders	7	0	0	3	**10**
**Chiefs**	3	3	7	7	**20**

at Arrowhead Stadium, Kansas City, Missouri

- Date: October 27
- Game time: 12:00 p.m. CST
- Game weather: Overcast, 39 °F (4 °C)
- Game attendance: 78,685
- Referee: Ron Winter
- TV announcers (CBS): Dick Enberg, Dan Dierdorf and Bonnie Bernstein
- Recap, Game Book

Game information

**First quarter**

- KC – Morten Andersen 46-yard field goal, 4:41. Chiefs 3–0. **Drive: 12 plays, 9 yards, 6:10.**
- OAK – Doug Jolley 1-yard pass from Rich Gannon (Sebastian Janikowski kick), 0:12. Raiders 7–3. **Drive: 11 plays, 73 yards, 4:29.**

**Second quarter**

- KC – Morten Andersen 22-yard field goal, 2:35. Raiders 7–6. **Drive: 11 plays, 85 yards, 4:43.**

**Third quarter**

- KC – Priest Holmes 3-yard run (Morten Andersen kick), 1:22. Chiefs 13–7. **Drive: 13 plays, 77 yards, 8:05.**

**Fourth quarter**

- OAK – Sebastian Janikowski 32-yard field goal, 11:34. Chiefs 13–10. **Drive: 12 plays, 60 yards, 4:48.**
- KC – Tony Richardson 4-yard pass from Trent Green (Morten Andersen kick), 1:55. Chiefs 20–10. **Drive: 5 plays, 22 yards, 2:44.**

**Top passers**

- OAK – Rich Gannon – 35/55, 334 yards, TD, INT
- KC – Trent Green – 18/30, 208 yards, TD, 2 INT

**Top rushers**

- OAK – Charlie Garner – 10 rushes, 47 yards
- KC – Priest Holmes – 23 rushes, 91 yards, TD

**Top receivers**

- OAK – Tim Brown – 13 receptions, 144 yards
- KC – Priest Holmes – 6 receptions, 93 yards

==== Week 10: at San Francisco 49ers ====
Week 10: Kansas City Chiefs (4–4) at San Francisco 49ers (6–2) – Game summary

Quarter	1	2	3	4	Total
Chiefs	3	7	0	3	**13**
**49ers**	3	14	0	0	**17**

at 3Com Park, San Francisco, California

- Date: November 10
- Game time: 3:15 p.m. CST/1:15 p.m. PST
- Game weather: Cloudy, 61 °F (16 °C)
- Game attendance: 67,881
- Referee: Ron Blum
- TV announcers (CBS): Greg Gumbel, Phil Simms and Armen Keteyian
- Recap, Game Book

Game information

**First quarter**

- SF – José Cortez 42-yard field goal, 7:06. 49ers 3–0. **Drive: 15 plays, 56 yards, 7:54.**
- KC – Morten Andersen 33-yard field goal, 2:13. Tied 3–3. **Drive: 10 plays, 48 yards, 4:53.**

**Second quarter**

- SF – Garrison Hearst 5-yard run (José Cortez kick), 11:13. 49ers 10–3. **Drive: 11 plays, 71 yards, 6:00.**
- KC – Priest Holmes 12-yard run (Morten Andersen kick), 9:06. Tied 10–10. **Drive: 4 plays, 50 yards, 2:07.**
- SF – Kevan Barlow 6-yard run (José Cortez kick), 2:40. 49ers 17–10. **Drive: 11 plays, 58 yards, 6:26.**

**Third quarter**

- No scoring plays.

**Fourth quarter**

- KC – Morten Andersen 43-yard field goal, 14:21. 49ers 17–13. **Drive: 10 plays, 38 yards, 5:09.**

**Top passers**

- KC – Trent Green – 15/27, 193 yards
- SF – Jeff Garcia – 25/35, 175 yards, INT

**Top rushers**

- KC – Priest Holmes – 11 rushes, 51 yards, TD
- SF – Garrison Hearst – 15 rushes, 69 yards, TD

**Top receivers**

- KC – Eddie Kennison – 8 receptions, 134 yards
- SF – Terrell Owens – 7 receptions, 51 yards

==== Week 11: vs. Buffalo Bills ====
Week 11: Buffalo Bills (5–4) at Kansas City Chiefs (4–5) – Game summary

Quarter	1	2	3	4	Total
Bills	0	13	3	0	**16**
**Chiefs**	7	3	0	7	**17**

at Arrowhead Stadium, Kansas City, Missouri

- Date: November 17
- Game time: 12:00 p.m. CST
- Game weather: Sunny, 48 °F (9 °C)
- Game attendance: 77,951
- Referee: Terry McAulay
- TV announcers (CBS): Greg Gumbel, Phil Simms and Armen Keteyian
- Recap, Game Book

Game information

**First quarter**

- KC – Priest Holmes 4-yard run (Morten Andersen kick), 3:02. Chiefs 7–0. **Drive: 6 plays, 64 yards, 2:51.**

**Second quarter**

- BUF – Mike Hollis 23-yard field goal, 11:34. Chiefs 7–3. **Drive: 15 plays, 75 yards, 6:28.**
- BUF – Mike Hollis 33-yard field goal, 8:42. Chiefs 7–6. **Drive: 6 plays, 36 yards, 2:52.**
- KC – Morten Andersen 38-yard field goal, 6:40. Chiefs 10–6. **Drive: 6 plays, 49 yards, 2:02**
- BUF – Eric Moulds 7-yard pass from Drew Bledsoe (Mike Hollis kick), 0:32. Bills 13–10. **Drive: 15 plays, 85 yards, 6:08.**

**Third quarter**

- BUF – Mike Hollis 27-yard field goal, 2:29. Bills 16–10. **Drive: 15 plays, 71 yards, 8:14.**

**Fourth quarter**

- KC – Trent Green 9-yard run (Morten Andersen kick), 4:53. Chiefs 17–16. **Drive: 9 plays, 78 yards, 5:23.**

**Top passers**

- BUF – Drew Bledsoe – 24/36, 225 yards, TD, INT
- KC – Trent Green – 12/20, 197 yards

**Top rushers**

- BUF – Travis Henry – 24 rushes, 126 yards
- KC – Priest Holmes – 31 rushes, 104 yards, TD

**Top receivers**

- BUF – Josh Reed – 4 receptions, 44 yards
- KC – Eddie Kennison – 3 receptions, 93 yards

==== Week 12: at Seattle Seahawks ====
Week 12: Kansas City Chiefs (5–5) at Seattle Seahawks (3–7) – Game summary

Quarter	1	2	3	4	Total
Chiefs	10	7	0	15	**32**
**Seahawks**	0	21	7	11	**39**

at Seahawks Stadium, Seattle, Washington

- Date: November 24
- Game time: 3:05 p.m. CST/1:05 p.m. PST
- Game weather: Sunny, 50 °F (10 °C)
- Game attendance: 56,250
- Referee: Bernie Kukar
- TV announcers (CBS): Ian Eagle and Solomon Wilcots
- Recap, Game Book

Game information

**First quarter**

- KC – Priest Holmes 15-yard run (Morten Andersen kick), 10:51. Chiefs 7–0. **Drive: 8 plays, 70 yards, 4:09.**
- KC – Morten Andersen 31-yard field goal, 3:29. Chiefs 10–0. **Drive: 10 plays, 60 yards, 5:44.**

**Second quarter**

- SEA – Shaun Alexander 3-yard run (Rian Lindell kick), 7:23. Chiefs 10–7. **Drive: 3 plays, 92 yards, 1:49.**
- KC – Priest Holmes 64-yard pass from Trent Green (Morten Andersen kick), 7:08. Chiefs 17–7. **Drive: 1 play, 64 yards, 0:24.**
- SEA – Mack Strong 2-yard pass from Matt Hasselbeck (Rian Lindell kick), 2:36. Chiefs 17–14. **Drive: 8 plays, 79 yards, 4:32.**
- SEA – Jerramy Stevens 6-yard pass from Matt Hasselbeck (Rian Lindell kick), 0:06. Seahawks 21–17. **Drive: 8 plays, 80 yards, 0:53.**

**Third quarter**

- SEA – Koren Robinson 17-yard pass from Matt Hasselbeck (Rian Lindell kick), 11:47. Seahawks 28–17. **Drive: 6 plays, 74 yards, 3:13.**

**Fourth quarter**

- KC – Priest Holmes 4-yard run (Trent Green run), 14:57. Seahawks 28–25. **Drive: 8 plays, 92 yards, 4:04.**
- SEA – Rian Lindell 37-yard field goal, 10:42. Seahawks 31–25. **Drive: 9 plays, 56 yards, 4:15.**
- SEA – Shaun Alexander 46-yard run (Matt Hasselbeck run), 1:52. Seahawks 39–25. **Drive: 11 plays, 94 yards, 3:58.**
- KC – Marc Boerigter 15-yard pass from Trent Green (Morten Andersen kick), 0:31. Seahawks 39–32. **Drive: 6 plays, 70 yards, 1:21.**

**Top passers**

- KC – Trent Green – 26/34, 343 yards, 2 TD, INT
- SEA – Matt Hasselbeck – 25/36, 362 yards, 3 TD

**Top rushers**

- KC – Priest Holmes – 23 rushes, 197 yards, 2 TD
- SEA – Shaun Alexander – 23 rushes, 145 yards, 2 TD

**Top receivers**

- KC – Priest Holmes – 7 receptions, 110 yards, TD
- SEA – Koren Robinson – 8 receptions, 168 yards, TD

**Team** – pass – rush – total – to

- KC – 343 – 217 – 552 – 1
- SEA – 362 – 180 – 534 – 0

==== Week 13: vs. Arizona Cardinals ====
Week 13: Arizona Cardinals (4–7) at Kansas City Chiefs (5–6) – Game summary

Quarter	1	2	3	4	Total
Cardinals	0	0	0	0	**0**
**Chiefs**	14	21	7	7	**49**

at Arrowhead Stadium, Kansas City, Missouri

- Date: December 1
- Game time: 12:00 p.m. CST
- Game weather: Sunny, 44 °F (7 °C)
- Game attendance: 77,809
- Referee: Dick Hantak
- TV announcers (Fox): Sam Rosen, Bill Maas, and Kevin McCabe
- Recap, Game Book

Game information

**First quarter**

- KC – Priest Holmes 5-yard run (Morten Andersen kick), 1:27. Chiefs 7–0. **Drive: 8 plays, 77 yards, 3:49.**
- KC – Dante Hall 90-yard punt return (Morten Andersen kick), 0:00. Chiefs 14–0.

**Second quarter**

- KC – Tony Richardson 3-yard run (Morten Andersen kick), 5:19. Chiefs 21–0. **Drive: 6 plays, 75 yards, 3:29.**
- KC – Priest Holmes 2-yard run (Morten Andersen kick), 1:14. Chiefs 28–0. **Drive: 4 plays, 61 yards, 1:53.**
- KC – Tony Gonzalez 23-yard pass from Trent Green (Morten Andersen kick), 1:14. Chiefs 35–0. **Drive: 5 plays, 59 yards, 0:31.**

**Third quarter**

- KC – Marc Boerigter 1-yard pass from Trent Green (Morten Andersen kick), 3:53. Chiefs 42–0. **Drive: 5 plays, 40 yards, 2:48.**

**Fourth quarter**

- KC – Marc Boerigter 29-yard pass from Todd Collins (Morten Andersen kick), 7:57. Chiefs 49–0. **Drive: 9 plays, 69 yards, 4:53.**

**Top passers**

- ARI – Jake Plummer – 14/31, 88 yards, 3 INT
- KC – Trent Green – 14/20, 209 yards, 2 TD

**Top rushers**

- ARI – Marcel Shipp – 14 rushes, 26 yards
- KC – Priest Holmes – 16 rushes, 113 yards, 2 TD

**Top receivers**

- ARI – Marcel Shipp – 7 receptions, 37 yards
- KC – Tony Gonzalez – 4 receptions, 74 yards, TD

**Team** – pass – rush – total – to

- ARI – 133 – 26 – 122 – 4
- KC – 266 – 216 – 477 – 1

==== Week 14: vs. St. Louis Rams ====
Week 14: St. Louis Rams (5–7) at Kansas City Chiefs (6–6) – Game summary

Quarter	1	2	3	4	Total
Rams	10	0	0	0	**10**
**Chiefs**	14	21	0	14	**49**

at Arrowhead Stadium, Kansas City, Missouri

- Date: December 8
- Game time: 12:00 p.m. CST
- Game weather: Mostly cloudy, 38 °F (3 °C)
- Game attendance: 78,601
- Referee: Bill Leavy
- TV announcers (Fox): Sam Rosen, Bill Maas, and Joel Goldberg
- Recap, Game Book

Game information

**First quarter**

- STL – Jeff Wilkins 36-yard field goal, 12:01. Rams 3–0. **Drive: 5 plays, 13 yards, 1:47.**
- KC – Dante Hall 88-yard kickoff return (Morten Andersen kick), 11:49. Chiefs 7–3.
- KC – Duane Clemons 42-yard fumble return (Morten Andersen kick), 10:16. Chiefs 14–3.
- STL – Isaac Bruce 8-yard pass from Jamie Martin (Jeff Wilkins kick), 1:43. Chiefs 14–10. **Drive: 4 plays, 51 yards, 2:05.**

**Second quarter**

- KC – Priest Holmes 2-yard run (Morten Andersen kick), 8:52. Chiefs 21–10. **Drive: 8 plays, 66 yards, 4:56.**
- KC – Dante Hall 86-yard punt return (Morten Andersen kick), 6:58. Chiefs 28–10.
- KC – Priest Holmes 1-yard run (Morten Andersen kick), 1:57. Chiefs 35–10. **Drive: 7 plays, 57 yards, 3:25.**

**Third quarter**

- No scoring plays.

**Fourth quarter**

- KC – Marc Boerigter 6-yard pass from Trent Green (Morten Andersen kick), 9:56. Chiefs 42–10. **Drive: 12 plays, 89 yards, 7:48.**
- KC – Mike Cloud 1-yard run (Morten Andersen kick), 5:24. Chiefs 49–10. **Drive: 7 plays, 56 yards, 3:56.**

**Top passers**

- STL – Jamie Martin – 24/35, 218 yards, TD, 2 INT
- KC – Trent Green – 10/15, 100 yards, TD

**Top rushers**

- STL – Lamar Gordon – 5 rushes, 14 yards
- KC – Priest Holmes – 24 rushes, 132 yards, 2 TD

**Top receivers**

- STL – Isaac Bruce – 5 receptions, 47 yards, TD
- KC – Tony Gonzalez – 5 receptions, 38 yards

==== Week 15: at Denver Broncos ====
Week 15: Kansas City Chiefs (7–6) at Denver Broncos (7–6) – Game summary

Quarter	1	2	3	4	Total
Chiefs	0	0	14	10	**24**
**Broncos**	14	0	14	3	**31**

at Invesco Field at Mile High, Denver, Colorado

- Date: December 15
- Game time: 3:05 p.m. CST/2:05 p.m. MST
- Game weather: Mostly cloudy, 54 °F (12 °C)
- Game attendance: 75,947
- Referee: Bill Carollo
- TV announcers (CBS): Dick Enberg, Dan Dierdorf, and Bonnie Bernstein
- Recap, Game Book

Game information

**First quarter**

- DEN – Clinton Portis 51-yard run (Jason Elam kick), 12:01. Broncos 7–0. **Drive: 6 plays, 79 yards, 2:59.**
- DEN – Clinton Portis 3-yard run (Jason Elam kick), 0:33. Broncos 14–0. **Drive: 6 plays, 67 yards, 2:55.**

**Second quarter**

- No scoring plays.

**Third quarter**

- KC – Dante Hall 75-yard pass from Trent Green (Morten Andersen kick), 11:28. Broncos 14–7. **Drive: 2 plays, 75 yards, 0:24.**
- DEN – Clinton Portis 1-yard run (Jason Elam kick), 6:32. Broncos 21–7. **Drive: 10 plays, 68 yards, 4:56.**
- DEN – Clinton Portis 66-yard pass from Brian Griese (Jason Elam kick), 3:53. Broncos 28–7. **Drive: 1 play, 66 yards, 0:15.**
- KC – Mike Cloud 4-yard run (Morten Andersen kick), 0:00. Broncos 28–14. **Drive: 5 plays, 69 yards, 2:10.**

**Fourth quarter**

- DEN – Jason Elam 30-yard field goal, 10:07. Broncos 31–14. **Drive: 9 play, 54 yards, 4:53.**
- KC – Dante Hall 49-yard pass from Trent Green (Morten Andersen kick), 8:15. Broncos 31–21. **Drive: 7 plays, 80 yards, 1:52.**
- KC – Morten Andersen 21-yard field goal, 2:25. Broncos 31–24. **Drive: 9 plays, 38 yards, 4:21.**

**Top passers**

- KC – Trent Green – 18/42, 310 yards, 2 TD
- DEN – Brian Griese – 18/26, 297 yards, TD, INT

**Top rushers**

- KC – Priest Holmes – 18 rushes, 161 yards
- DEN – Clinton Portis – 21 rushes, 130 yards, 3 TD

**Top receivers**

- KC – Dante Hall – 5 receptions, 143 yards, 2 TD
- DEN – Rod Smith – 3 receptions, 83 yards

==== Week 16: vs. San Diego Chargers ====
Week 16: San Diego Chargers (8–6) at Kansas City Chiefs (7–7) – Game summary

Quarter	1	2	3	4	Total
Chargers	3	3	9	7	**22**
**Chiefs**	7	7	7	3	**24**

at Arrowhead Stadium, Kansas City, Missouri

- Date: December 22
- Game time: 12:00 p.m. CST
- Game weather: Sunny, 33 °F (1 °C)
- Game attendance: 77,899
- Referee: Ron Winter
- TV announcers (CBS): Gus Johnson and Brent Jones
- Recap, Game Book

Game information

**First quarter**

- KC – Marc Boerigter 8-yard pass from Trent Green (Michael Husted kick), 5:11. Chiefs 7–0. **Drive: 10 plays, 66 yards, 5:19.**
- SD – Steve Christie 30-yard field goal, 2:01. Chiefs 7–3. **Drive: 8 plays, 60 yards, 3:10.**

**Second quarter**

- KC – Omar Easy 6-yard pass from Trent Green (Michael Husted kick), 1:15. Chiefs 14–3. **Drive: 13 plays, 88 yards, 6:45.**
- SD – Steve Christie 49-yard field goal, 0:14. Chiefs 14–6. **Drive: 7 plays, 35 yards, 1:01.**

**Third quarter**

- KC – Marc Boerigter 99-yard pass from Trent Green (Michael Husted kick), 5:11. Chiefs 21–6. **Drive: 1 play, 98 yards, 0:13.**
- SD – Tim Dwight 9-yard pass from Drew Brees (pass failed), 7:35. Chiefs 21–12. **Drive: 7 plays, 71 yards, 3:21.**
- SD – Steve Christie 24-yard field goal, 2:27. Chiefs 21–15. **Drive: 8 plays, 64 yards, 2:59.**

**Fourth quarter**

- SD – Fred McCrary 3-yard pass from Drew Brees (Steve Christie kick), 10:58. Chargers 22–21. **Drive: 9 plays, 79 yards, 4:30.**
- KC – Michael Husted 38-yard field goal, 1:08. Chiefs 24–22. **Drive: 13 plays, 77 yards, 4:15.**

**Top passers**

- SD – Drew Brees – 26/40, 242 yards, 2 TD
- KC – Trent Green – 23/36, 337 yards, 3 TD, INT

**Top rushers**

- SD – LaDainian Tomlinson – 24 rushes, 131 yards
- KC – Mike Cloud – 16 rushes, 19 yards

**Top receivers**

- SD – Tim Dwight – 6 receptions, 63 yards, TD
- KC – Marc Boerigter – 5 receptions, 144 yards, 2 TD

==== Week 17: at Oakland Raiders ====
Week 17: Kansas City Chiefs (8–7) at Oakland Raiders (10–5) – Game summary

Quarter	1	2	3	4	Total
Chiefs	0	0	0	0	**0**
**Raiders**	0	14	3	7	**24**

at Network Associates Coliseum, Oakland, California

- Date: December 28
- Game time: 4:00 p.m. CST/2:00 p.m. PST
- Game weather: Rain, 50 °F (10 °C)
- Game attendance: 62,078
- Referee: Tony Corrente
- TV announcers (CBS): Dick Enberg, Dan Dierdorf, and Bonnie Bernstein
- Recap, Game Book

Game information

**First quarter**

- No scoring plays.

**Second quarter**

- OAK – Charlie Garner 1-yard run (Sebastian Janikowski kick), 13:11. Raiders 7–0. **Drive: 10 plays, 55 yards, 5:17.**
- OAK – Doug Jolley 15-yard pass from Rich Gannon (Sebastian Janikowski kick), 1:34. Raiders 14–0. **Drive: 14 plays, 80 yards, 6:42.**

**Third quarter**

- OAK – Sebastian Janikowski 27-yard field goal, 7:01. Raiders 17–0. **Drive: 16 plays, 57 yards, 7:59.**

**Fourth quarter**

- OAK – Zack Crockett 8-yard run (Sebastian Janikowski kick), 2:18. Raiders 24–0. **Drive: 10 plays, 70 yards, 5:57.**

**Top passers**

- KC – Trent Green – 15/32, 137 yards, INT
- OAK – Rich Gannon – 7/14, 79 yards, TD

**Top rushers**

- KC – Mike Cloud – 9 rushes, 23 yards
- OAK – Charlie Garner – 29 rushes, 135 yards, TD

**Top receivers**

- KC – Derrick Blaylock – 5 receptions, 47 yards
- OAK – Tim Brown – 2 receptions, 31 yards

=== Standings ===
AFC West
	W	L	T	PCT	DIV	CONF	PF	PA	STK
^{(1)} Oakland Raiders	11	5	0	.688	4–2	9–3	450	304	W2
Denver Broncos	9	7	0	.563	3–3	5–7	392	344	W1
San Diego Chargers	8	8	0	.500	3–3	6–6	333	367	L4
Kansas City Chiefs	8	8	0	.500	2–4	6–6	467	399	L1

==== Conference ====
AFC
#	Team	Division	W	L	T	PCT	DIV	CONF	SOS	SOV
**Division leaders**
1 (Note: Oakland finished ahead of Tennessee based on head-to-head victory.)	Oakland Raiders	West	11	5	0	.688	4–2	9–3	.529	.531
2	Tennessee Titans	South	11	5	0	.688	6–0	9–3	.479	.474
3	Pittsburgh Steelers	North	10	5	1	.656	6–0	8–4	.486	.451
4 (Note: N.Y. Jets finished ahead of New England based on win percentage in common games (8–4 to 7–5) after both finished ahead of Miami based on division record (4–2 to 2–4).)	New York Jets	East	9	7	0	.563	4–2	6–6	.500	.500
**Wild Cards**
5	Indianapolis Colts	South	10	6	0	.625	4–2	8–4	.479	.400
6 (Note: Cleveland finished ahead of Denver and New England based on conference record (7–5 vs 5–7/6–6))	Cleveland Browns	North	9	7	0	.563	3–3	7–5	.486	.413
**Did not qualify for the postseason**
7 (Note: Denver finished ahead of New England based on head-to-head victory.)	Denver Broncos	West	9	7	0	.563	3–3	5–7	.527	.486
8 (Note: New England finished ahead of Miami based on division record (4–2 to 2–4).)	New England Patriots	East	9	7	0	.563	4–2	6–6	.525	.455
9	Miami Dolphins	East	9	7	0	.563	2–4	7–5	.508	.486
10 (Note: Buffalo finished ahead of San Diego based on head-to-head victory.)	Buffalo Bills	East	8	8	0	.500	2–4	5–7	.473	.352
11 (Note: San Diego finished ahead of Kansas City based on division record (3–3 to 2–4).)	San Diego Chargers	West	8	8	0	.500	3–3	6–6	.492	.453
12	Kansas City Chiefs	West	8	8	0	.500	2–4	6–6	.527	.516
13	Baltimore Ravens	North	7	9	0	.438	3–3	7–5	.506	.384
14	Jacksonville Jaguars	South	6	10	0	.375	1–5	4–8	.506	.438
15	Houston Texans	South	4	12	0	.250	1–5	2–10	.518	.492
16	Cincinnati Bengals	North	2	14	0	.125	0–6	1–11	.537	.406
**Tiebreakers** (Note: When breaking ties for three or more teams under the NFL's rules, they are first broken within divisions, then comparing only the highest ranked remaining team from each division.)
