= 2002 Oakland Raiders season =

NFL team season

- Owner: Al Davis
- General manager: Al Davis
- Head coach: Bill Callahan
- Home stadium: Network Associates Coliseum

Results
- Record: 11–5
- Division place: 1st AFC West
- Playoffs: Won Divisional Playoffs (vs. Jets) 30–10; Won AFC Championship (vs. Titans) 41–24; Lost Super Bowl XXXVII (vs. Buccaneers) 21–48
- All-Pros: QB Rich Gannon (1st team); WR Jerry Rice (2nd team); T Lincoln Kennedy (1st team); C Barret Robbins (1st team); FS Rod Woodson (1st team)
- Pro Bowlers: QB Rich Gannon; WR Jerry Rice; T Lincoln Kennedy; C Barret Robbins; FS Rod Woodson

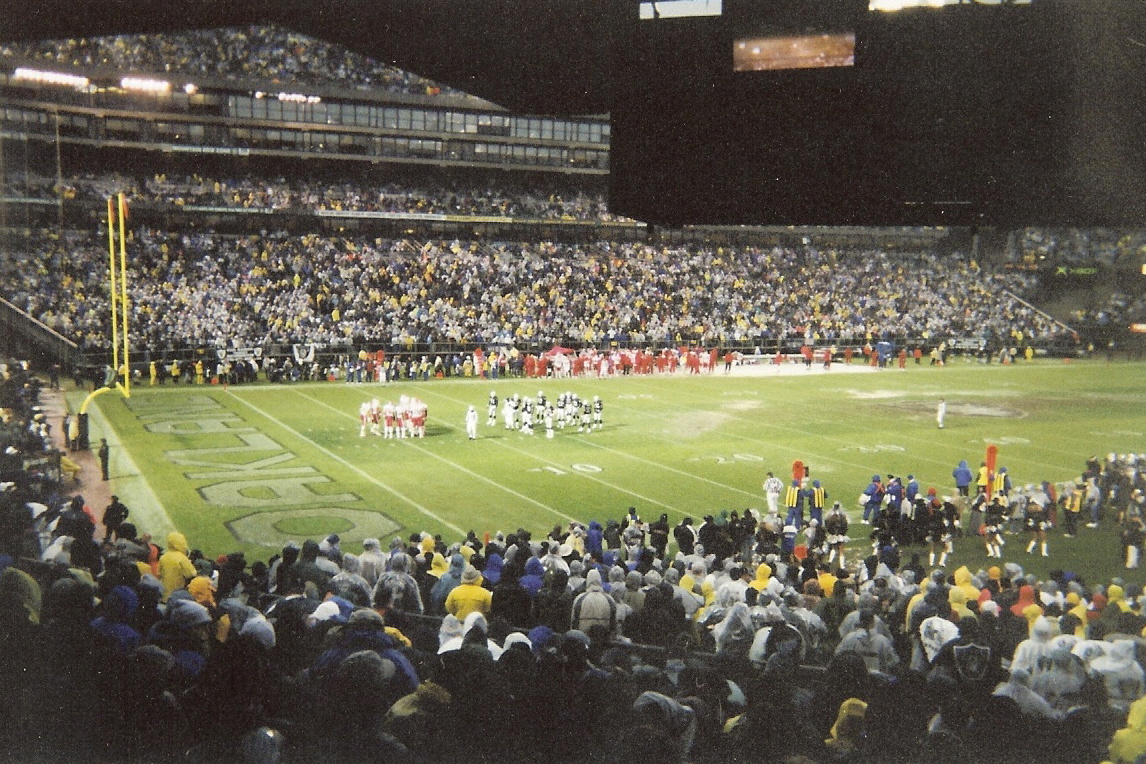
Oakland–Alameda County Coliseum during the Raiders' 2002 week 17 win over Kansas City

The 2002 season was the Oakland Raiders' 33rd in the National Football League (NFL), their 43rd overall, their eighth since returning to Oakland and their first under head coach Bill Callahan. The Raiders played their home games at Network Associates Coliseum as members of the AFC West. The Raiders had essentially traded their head coach Jon Gruden following the 2001 season. The Raiders hired Callahan, the offensive coordinator under Gruden, to serve as their new head coach.

Despite their talent, the Raiders struggled in the first half of the season. A 4–0 start was followed by four consecutive losses; the team's 4–4 record stunned many onlookers. The team, however, redeemed itself by winning seven of its final eight contests. In the third quarter of Oakland's 26–20 win on Monday Night Football over the Jets, Tim Brown became the third player in NFL history with 1,000 career catches. Finishing 11–5 in a conference where twelve teams obtained .500 or better records and nine were above .500, the Raiders won the AFC West for the third consecutive season, a first-round bye, and home-field advantage throughout the AFC's playoffs as the top seed. They routed the New York Jets and Tennessee Titans in the playoffs, by a combined score of 71–34 and +4 in the turnover differential; in doing so, they advanced to their first Super Bowl since 1984. Their opponent was the Tampa Bay Buccaneers, led by their former coach Jon Gruden.

The Raiders entered Super Bowl XXXVII as slight favorites; many predicted a hard-fought showdown between Oakland's top-ranked offense and Tampa Bay's top-ranked defense. The resulting game, however, ended in disaster for the Raiders. An early three-point lead (courtesy of a Sebastian Janikowski field goal) evaporated as the Buccaneers scored 34 unanswered points. The Buccaneers' defense, aided by Gruden's knowledge of the Raider offense and Raiders' failure to change many of the terms for their offense, intercepted Rich Gannon three times during this scoring surge. Many times, Buccaneer safety John Lynch was able to determine what play was coming based on audibles called by Raider quarterback Rich Gannon. A furious Raider rally cut the score to an almost-competitive 34–21 in the fourth quarter. However, two more Gannon interceptions sealed the Raiders' fate in a 48–21 bludgeoning.

The years following the Super Bowl loss marked a period of decline and futility for the Raiders, earning neither a winning record nor a playoff trip until 2016. As of 2025, this represents the most recent AFC West title and postseason win for the Raiders.

The last remaining active member of the 2002 Oakland Raiders was kicker Sebastian Janikowski, who played his final NFL game in the 2018 season, although he missed the 2017 season.

== Offseason ==
| Additions | Subtractions |
|---|---|
| DT Sam Adams (Ravens) | CB Eric Allen (retirement) |
| QB Rick Mirer (49ers) | LB Greg Biekert (Vikings) |
| DT John Parrella (Chargers) | QB Rodney Peete (Panthers) |
| LB Bill Romanowski (Broncos) | G Steve Wisniewski (retirement) |
| FS Rod Woodson (Ravens) | |

=== NFL draft ===
2002 Oakland Raiders draft
| Round | Pick | Player | Position | College | Notes |
| 1 | 17 | Phillip Buchanon | Cornerback | Miami | from Atlanta |
| 1 | 23 | Napoleon Harris | Linebacker | Northwestern | |
| 2 | 53 | Langston Walker | Tackle | California | from Tampa Bay |
| 2 | 55 | Doug Jolley | Tight end | BYU | |
| 5 | 147 | Kenyon Coleman | Defensive end | UCLA | |
| 6 | 189 | Keyon Nash | Safety | Albany State | |
| 6 | 197 | Larry Ned | Running back | San Diego State | |
| 7 | 235 | Ronald Curry | Wide receiver | North Carolina | |
Made roster

=== Undrafted free agents ===
2002 undrafted free agents of note
| Player | Position | College |
|---|---|---|
| Mavin Bennett | Running back | Baylor |
| Willie Ford | Cornerback | Syracuse |
| Derrick Pickens | Defensive tackle | Iowa |
| Teag Whiting | Tackle | BYU |
| Royd Williams | Wide receiver | UAB |

== Background ==
The 2002 season, due mainly to the aforementioned Super Bowl run, ranks among the most important in franchise history. The aging Raiders' controversial elimination from the prior year's playoffs set the stage for a concerted championship push. Owner Al Davis traded then-head coach Jon Gruden to the Tampa Bay Buccaneers shortly after the Raiders' 2001 playoff loss; in doing so, he received two first-round picks, two second-round picks, and cash considerations from Tampa Bay. Davis, despite team salary cap troubles, also managed to acquire veteran stars Sam Adams, Rod Woodson, and Bill Romanowski during the 2002 offseason.

The Raiders entered the season with a hugely talented, albeit aging roster of players. The offense was led by quarterback Rich Gannon, who would be named MVP for the season. The team's receiving corps of Tim Brown, Jerry Rice, and Jerry Porter ranked among the league's best; additionally, running back Charlie Garner posted 1,903 all-purpose yards. The offensive line, moreover, was anchored by pro-bowlers Lincoln Kennedy and Barret Robbins. The Raiders' offense, all told, led the league in total yardage; Gannon additionally led all NFL quarterbacks in passing with 4,689 yards. The defense, while less vaunted, nonetheless ranked among the NFL's finest; the contributions of Rod Woodson, Bill Romanowski, Charles Woodson, and Trace Armstrong aided the Raiders' cause greatly.

== Staff ==
2002 Oakland Raiders staff
| Front office: Owner / General Manager – Al Davis; Senior Executive – John Herrera; Head coaches: Head coach – Bill Callahan; Offensive coaches: Offensive coordinator – Marc Trestman; Running backs – Skip Peete; Wide receivers – Fred Biletnikoff; Tight ends – Jay Norvell; Offensive line – Aaron Kromer; Senior assistant – John Morton; Offensive assistant – Jim Harbaugh; Offensive assistant – Chris Turner | Defensive coaches: Defensive coordinator – Chuck Bresnahan; Defensive line – Mike Waufle; Linebackers – Fred Pagac; Defensive backs – Ron Lynn; Quality control/defense – Chris Griswold; Quality control/defense – Don Martin; Squad development – Willie Brown; Special teams coaches: Special teams coordinator – Bob Casullo; Strength and conditioning: Strength and conditioning coordinator – Garrett Giemont |

== Roster ==
2002 Oakland Raiders roster
| Quarterbacks (QB): 12 Rich Gannon; 3 Rick Mirer; 8 Marques Tuiasosopo; Running backs (RB): 32 Zack Crockett FB; 25 Charlie Garner; 28 Randy Jordan; 40 Jon Ritchie FB; 47 Tyrone Wheatley; Wide receivers (WR): 81 Tim Brown; 82 James Jett; 83 Marcus Knight; 84 Jerry Porter; 80 Jerry Rice; 87 Alvis Whitted; Tight ends (TE): 88 Doug Jolley; 85 Marcus Williams; 86 Roland Williams | Offensive linemen (OL): 70 Brad Badger G/T; 79 Mo Collins G; 72 Lincoln Kennedy T; 73 Frank Middleton G; 63 Barret Robbins C; 65 Barry Sims T; 78 Chad Slaughter T; 74 Matt Stinchcomb G; 62 Adam Treu C; 66 Langston Walker T; Defensive linemen (DL): 95 Sam Adams DT; 93 Trace Armstrong DE; 90 Kenyon Coleman DE; 57 Rod Coleman DT; 75 Chris Cooper DE; 99 DeLawrence Grant DE; 92 Junior Ioane DT; 97 John Parrella DT; 91 Regan Upshaw DE | Linebackers (LB): 50 Eric Barton OLB; 58 Napoleon Harris MLB; 51 Tim Johnson MLB; 53 Bill Romanowski OLB; 55 Travian Smith OLB; Defensive backs (DB): 33 Anthony Dorsett SS; 36 Derrick Gibson SS; 34 Darrien Gordon CB; 20 Tory James CB; 39 Brandon Jennings CB; 41 Eric Johnson FS; 38 Clarence Love CB; 22 Terrance Shaw CB; 24 Charles Woodson CB; 26 Rod Woodson FS; Special teams (ST): 11 Sebastian Janikowski K; 9 Shane Lechler P | Practice squad: 1 Ronald Curry QB; 23 Madre Hill RB; 37 Tony Lukins CB; 44 Keyon Nash S; 48 Ben Steele TE; Reserve: 77 Darryl Ashmore T (IR); 27 Calvin Branch S (NF-Inj.); 94 Tony Bryant DE (IR); 31 Phillip Buchanon CB/PR (IR); 89 Mondriel Fulcher TE (IR); 42 Terry Kirby RB (IR); 96 Darrell Russell DT (Susp.); Rookies in italics 53 active, 7 reserve, 5 practice squad |

Rookies in italics

== Regular season ==
=== Schedule ===
| Week | Date | Opponent | Result | Record | Venue | Attendance | Recap |
|---|---|---|---|---|---|---|---|
| 1 | September 8 | Seattle Seahawks | **W** 31–17 | 1–0 | Network Associates Coliseum | 53,260 | Recap |
| 2 | September 15 | at Pittsburgh Steelers | **W** 30–17 | 2–0 | Heinz Field | 62,260 | Recap |
| 3 | Bye | | | | | | |
| 4 | September 29 | Tennessee Titans | **W** 52–25 | 3–0 | Network Associates Coliseum | 58,719 | Recap |
| 5 | October 6 | at Buffalo Bills | **W** 49–31 | 4–0 | Ralph Wilson Stadium | 73,038 | Recap |
| 6 | October 13 | at St. Louis Rams | **L** 13–28 | 4–1 | Edward Jones Dome | 66,070 | Recap |
| 7 | October 20 | **San Diego Chargers** | **L** 21–27 (OT) | 4–2 | Network Associates Coliseum | 60,974 | Recap |
| 8 | October 27 | at **Kansas City Chiefs** | **L** 10–20 | 4–3 | Arrowhead Stadium | 78,685 | Recap |
| 9 | November 3 | San Francisco 49ers | **L** 20–23 (OT) | 4–4 | Network Associates Coliseum | 62,660 | Recap |
| 10 | November 11 | at **Denver Broncos** | **W** 34–10 | 5–4 | Invesco Field at Mile High | 76,643 | Recap |
| 11 | November 17 | New England Patriots | **W** 27–20 | 6–4 | Network Associates Coliseum | 62,552 | Recap |
| 12 | November 24 | at Arizona Cardinals | **W** 41–20 | 7–4 | Sun Devil Stadium | 58,814 | Recap |
| 13 | December 2 | New York Jets | **W** 26–20 | 8–4 | Network Associates Coliseum | 62,257 | Recap |
| 14 | December 8 | at **San Diego Chargers** | **W** 27–7 | 9–4 | Qualcomm Stadium | 67,968 | Recap |
| 15 | December 15 | at Miami Dolphins | **L** 17–23 | 9–5 | Pro Player Stadium | 73,572 | Recap |
| 16 | December 22 | **Denver Broncos** | **W** 28–16 | 10–5 | Network Associates Coliseum | 62,592 | Recap |
| 17 | December 28 | **Kansas City Chiefs** | **W** 24–0 | 11–5 | Network Associates Coliseum | 62,078 | Recap |

Note: Intra-division opponents are in bold text.

=== Game summaries ===
==== Week 1: vs. Seattle Seahawks ====
Week 1: Seattle Seahawks at Oakland Raiders – Game summary

| Quarter | 1 | 2 | 3 | 4 | Total |
|---|---|---|---|---|---|
| Seahawks | 7 | 0 | 0 | 10 | **17** |
| **Raiders** | 7 | 21 | 3 | 0 | **31** |

at Network Associates Coliseum, Oakland, California

- Date: September 8
- Game time: 1:17pm local
- Game weather: clear, 70 °F (21 °C), 47% humidity, wind W 7 miles per hour (11 km/h)
- Game attendance: 53,260
- Referee: Larry Nemmers
- TV announcers (Fox): Ron Pitts, Dave Krieg, and Brian Webber
- Gamecenter, Gamebook

Game information

**First quarter**

- OAK – Tim Brown 8-yard pass from Rich Gannon (Sebastian Janikowski kick), 10:47 (OAK 7–0)
- SEA – Itula Mili 1-yard pass from Matt Hasselbeck (Rian Lindell kick), 6:53 (Tied 7–7)

**Second quarter**

- OAK – Charlie Garner 20-yard run (Sebastian Janikowski kick), 13:51 (OAK 14–7)
- OAK – Charlie Garner 26-yard run (Sebastian Janikowski kick), 9:38 (OAK 21–7)
- OAK – Randy Jordan 12-yard run (Sebastian Janikowski kick), 3:17 (OAK 28–7)

**Third quarter**

- OAK – Sebastian Janikowski 27-yard field goal, 9:02 (OAK 31–7)

**Fourth quarter**

- SEA – Rian Lindell 19-yard field goal, 14:57 (OAK 31–10)
- SEA – Shaun Alexander 11-yard pass from Matt Hasselbeck (Rian Lindell kick), 5:44 (OAK 31–17)

**Top passers**

- SEA – Matt Hasselbeck: 23/32, 155 yds, 2 TD
- OAK – Rich Gannon: 19/28, 214 yds, 2 TD, 1 INT

**Top rushers**

- SEA – Shaun Alexander: 13 car, 36 yds
- OAK – Charlie Garner: 15 car, 127 yds, 1 TD

**Top receivers**

- SEA – Koren Robinson: 5 rec, 39 yds
- OAK – Charlie Garner: 5 rec, 64 yds, 1 TD

**Team** – pass – rush – total – to

- SEA – 143 – 43 – 186 – 0
- OAK – 202 – 221 – 423 – 2

==== Week 5: at Buffalo Bills ====
Week 5: Oakland Raiders (3–0) at Buffalo Bills (2–2) – Game summary

| Quarter | 1 | 2 | 3 | 4 | Total |
|---|---|---|---|---|---|
| **Raiders** | 7 | 14 | 7 | 21 | **49** |
| Bills | 0 | 21 | 10 | 0 | **31** |

at Ralph Wilson Stadium, Orchard Park, New York

- Date: October 6, 2002
- Game time: 1:00 pm
- Game weather: Sunny, 64 °F (18 °C)
- Game attendance: 73,038
- Referee: Bernie Kukar (86)
- TV announcers (CBS): Kevin Harlan, Randy Cross and Beasley Reece
- Recap, Game Book

Game information

**First quarter**

- OAK – Jerry Porter 29-yard pass from Rich Gannon (Sebastian Janikowski kick), 0:39 Raiders 7–0. **Drive: 10 plays, 75 yards, 4:25.**

**Second quarter**

- BUF – Peerless Price 2-yard pass from Drew Bledsoe (Mike Hollis kick), 9:48 Tied 7–7. **Drive: 11 plays, 80 yards, 5:51.**
- OAK – Rich Gannon 1-yard run (Sebastian Janikowski kick), 8:11 Raiders 14–7. **Drive: 5 plays, 70 yards, 1:37.**
- BUF – Dave Moore 2-yard pass from Drew Bledsoe (Mike Hollis kick), 6:42 Tied 14–14. **Drive: 4 plays, 80 yards, 1:29.**
- OAK – Charlie Garner 36-yard run (Sebastian Janikowski kick), 4:38 Raiders 21–14. **Drive: 5 plays, 75 yards, 2:04.**
- BUF – Larry Centers 5-yard run (Mike Hollis kick), 0:40 Tied 21–21. **Drive: 5 plays, 98 yards, 0:52.**

**Third quarter**

- BUF – Mike Hollis 30-yard field goal, 10:10 Bills 24–21. **Drive: 9 plays, 62 yards, 4:50.**
- OAK – Zack Crockett 1-yard run (Sebastian Janikowski kick), 6:17 Raiders 28–24. **Drive: 4 plays, 32 yards, 2:12.**
- BUF – Travis Henry 2-yard run (Mike Hollis kick), 2:19 Bills 31–28. **Drive: 8 plays, 80 yards, 3:58.**

**Fourth quarter**

- OAK – Charlie Garner 69-yard pass from Rich Gannon (Sebastian Janikowski kick), 11:18 Raiders 35–31. **Drive: 4 plays, 80 yards, 1:34.**
- OAK – Phillip Buchanon 81-yard interception return (Sebastian Janikowski kick), 8:02 Raiders 42–31
- OAK – Jerry Rice 20-yard pass from Rich Gannon (Sebastian Janikowski kick), 4:20 Raiders 49–31. **Drive: 4 plays, 68 yards, 2:12.**

**Top passers**

- OAK – Rich Gannon – 23/38, 357 yards, 3 TD
- BUF – Drew Bledsoe – 32/53, 417 yards, 2 TD, 3 INT

**Top rushers**

- OAK – Charlie Garner – 8 rushes, 94 yards, TD
- BUF – Travis Henry – 15 rushes, 58 yards, TD

**Top receivers**

- OAK – Jerry Porter – 7 receptions, 117 yards, TD
- BUF – Peerless Price – 7 receptions, 126 yards, TD

==== Week 7: vs. San Diego Chargers ====
Week 7: San Diego Chargers (5–1) at Oakland Raiders (4–1) – Game summary

| Quarter | 1 | 2 | 3 | 4 | OT | Total |
|---|---|---|---|---|---|---|
| **Chargers** | 0 | 7 | 7 | 7 | 6 | **27** |
| Raiders | 0 | 0 | 7 | 14 | 0 | **21** |

at Network Associates Coliseum, Oakland, California

- Date: October 20
- Game time: 1:05 p.m. PDT
- Game weather: 62 °F (17 °C), relative humidity 78%, wind 9 mph
- Game attendance: 60,974
- Referee: Tony Corrente
- TV announcers (CBS): Greg Gumbel, Phil Simms and Armen Keteyian
- Box score, Game Book

Game information

**First quarter**

- No scoring plays.

**Second quarter**

- SDG – Reche Caldwell 9-yard pass from Drew Brees (Steve Christie kick), 7:17. Chargers 7–0. **Drive: 8 plays, 58 yards, 4:17.**

**Third quarter**

- SDG – LaDainian Tomlinson 4-yard pass from Drew Brees (Steve Christie kick), 9:12. Chargers 14–0. **Drive: 10 plays, 79 yards, 5:48.**
- OAK – Jerry Rice 4-yard pass from Rich Gannon (Sebastian Janikowski kick), 5:16. Chargers 14–7. **Drive: 7 plays, 68 yards, 3:56.**

**Fourth quarter**

- OAK – Jerry Porter 17-yard pass from Rich Gannon (Sebastian Janikowski kick), 14:54. Tied 14–14. **Drive: 6 plays, 93 yards, 3:24.**
- SDG – Drew Brees 1-yard run (Steve Christie kick), 7:18. Chargers 21–14. **Drive: 9 plays, 62 yards, 4:26.**
- OAK – Jon Ritchie 7-yard pass from Rich Gannon (Sebastian Janikowski kick), 1:21. Tied 21–21. **Drive: 9 plays, 82 yards, 1:44.**

**Overtime**

- SDG – LaDainian Tomlinson 19-yard run, 11:22. Chargers 27–21. **Drive: 8 plays, 80 yards, 3:38.**

**Top passers**

- SDG – Drew Brees – 16/25, 170 yards, 2 TD
- OAK – Rich Gannon – 35/45, 361 yards, 3 TD, INT

**Top rushers**

- SDG – LaDainian Tomlinson – 39 rushes, 153 yards, TD
- OAK – Charlie Garner – 7 rushes, 24 yards

**Top receivers**

- SDG – Tim Dwight – 4 receptions, 75 yards
- OAK – Jerry Rice – 9 receptions, 86 yards, TD

==== Week 8: at Kansas City Chiefs ====
Week 8: Oakland Raiders (4–2) at Kansas City Chiefs (3–4) – Game summary

| Quarter | 1 | 2 | 3 | 4 | Total |
|---|---|---|---|---|---|
| Raiders | 7 | 0 | 0 | 3 | **10** |
| **Chiefs** | 3 | 3 | 7 | 7 | **20** |

at Arrowhead Stadium, Kansas City, Missouri

- Date: October 27
- Game time: 12:00 p.m. CST
- Game weather: Overcast, 39 °F (4 °C)
- Game attendance: 78,685
- Referee: Ron Winter
- TV announcers (CBS): Dick Enberg, Dan Dierdorf and Bonnie Bernstein
- Recap, Game Book

Game information

**First quarter**

- KC – Morten Andersen 46-yard field goal, 4:41. Chiefs 3–0. **Drive: 12 plays, 9 yards, 6:10.**
- OAK – Doug Jolley 1-yard pass from Rich Gannon (Sebastian Janikowski kick), 0:12. Raiders 7–3. **Drive: 11 plays, 73 yards, 4:29.**

**Second quarter**

- KC – Morten Andersen 22-yard field goal, 2:35. Raiders 7–6. **Drive: 11 plays, 85 yards, 4:43.**

**Third quarter**

- KC – Priest Holmes 3-yard run (Morten Andersen kick), 1:22. Chiefs 13–7. **Drive: 13 plays, 77 yards, 8:05.**

**Fourth quarter**

- OAK – Sebastian Janikowski 32-yard field goal, 11:34. Chiefs 13–10. **Drive: 12 plays, 60 yards, 4:48.**
- KC – Tony Richardson 4-yard pass from Trent Green (Morten Andersen kick), 1:55. Chiefs 20–10. **Drive: 5 plays, 22 yards, 2:44.**

**Top passers**

- OAK – Rich Gannon – 35/55, 334 yards, TD, INT
- KC – Trent Green – 18/30, 208 yards, TD, 2 INT

**Top rushers**

- OAK – Charlie Garner – 10 rushes, 47 yards
- KC – Priest Holmes – 23 rushes, 91 yards, TD

**Top receivers**

- OAK – Tim Brown – 13 receptions, 144 yards
- KC – Priest Holmes – 6 receptions, 93 yards

==== Week 11: vs. New England Patriots ====
Week 11: New England Patriots (5–4) at Oakland Raiders (5–4) – Game summary

| Quarter | 1 | 2 | 3 | 4 | Total |
|---|---|---|---|---|---|
| Patriots | 3 | 3 | 7 | 7 | **20** |
| **Raiders** | 3 | 14 | 7 | 3 | **27** |

at Network Associates Coliseum, Oakland, California

- Date: November 17, 2002
- Game time: 8:30 p.m.
- Game weather: Clear, 61 °F (16 °C)
- Game attendance: 62,552
- Referee: Ed Hochuli (85)
- TV announcers (ESPN): Mike Patrick, Paul Maguire, Joe Theismann, and Suzy Kolber
- Recap, Game Book

Game information

**First quarter**

- NE – Adam Vinatieri 36-yard field goal, 9:09. Patriots 3–0. **Drive: 11 plays, 41 yards, 5:51.**
- OAK – Sebastian Janikowski 39-yard field goal, 0:51. Tied 3–3. **Drive: 10 plays, 54 yards, 4:13.**

**Second quarter**

- OAK – Zack Crockett 2-yard run (Sebastian Janikowski kick), 9:58. Raiders 10–3. **Drive: 10 plays, 63 yards, 5:02.**
- NE – Adam Vinatieri 31-yard field goal, 4:16. Raiders 10–6. **Drive: 13 plays, 59 yards, 5:42.**
- OAK – Rich Gannon 2-yard run (Sebastian Janikowski kick), 0:52. Raiders 17–6. **Drive: 2 plays, 8 yards, 0:44.**

**Third quarter**

- OAK – Zack Crockett 2-yard run (Sebastian Janikowski kick), 5:18. Raiders 24–6. **Drive: 15 plays, 85 yards, 9:42.**
- NE – Tedy Bruschi 48-yard interception return (Adam Vinatieri kick), 1:27. Raiders 24–13.

**Fourth quarter**

- OAK – Sebastian Janikowski 28-yard field goal, 1:13. Raiders 27–13. **Drive: 7 plays, 34 yards, 2:28.**
- NE – Kevin Faulk 86-yard kickoff return (Adam Vinatieri kick), 0:59. Raiders 27–20. **Drive: 0 plays, 0 yards, 0:14.**

**Top passers**

- NE – Tom Brady – 18/30, 172 yards
- OAK – Rich Gannon – 26/38, 297 yards, INT

**Top rushers**

- NE – Antowain Smith – 15 rushes, 49 yards
- OAK – Charlie Garner – 15 rushes, 57 yards

**Top receivers**

- NE – Troy Brown – 5 receptions, 55 yards
- OAK – Tim Brown – 5 receptions, 71 yards

==== Week 12: at Arizona Cardinals ====
Week 12: Oakland Raiders (6–4) at Arizona Cardinals (4–6) – Game summary

| Quarter | 1 | 2 | 3 | 4 | Total |
|---|---|---|---|---|---|
| **Raiders** | 14 | 7 | 17 | 3 | **41** |
| Cardinals | 0 | 14 | 0 | 6 | **20** |

at Sun Devil Stadium, Tempe, Arizona

- Date: November 24
- Game time: 2:05 p.m. MST
- Game weather: 75 °F (24 °C)
- Game attendance: 58,814
- Referee: Bill Carollo
- TV announcers (CBS): Kevin Harlan, Randy Cross, Beasley Reece
- Box Score

Game information

**First quarter**

- OAK – Jerry Porter 7-yard pass from Rich Gannon (Sebastian Janikowski kick), 8:51. Raiders 7–0.
- OAK – Charlie Garner 8-yard run (Sebastian Janikowski kick), 1:14. Raiders 14–0.

**Second quarter**

- ARI – Marcel Shipp 3-yard run (Bill Gramática kick), 13:53. Raiders 14–7.
- OAK – Jerry Porter 14-yard pass from Rich Gannon (Sebastian Janikowski kick), 5:31. Raiders 21–7.
- ARI – Joel Makovicka 1-yard pass from Jake Plummer (Bill Gramática kick), 1:08. Raiders 21–14.

**Third quarter**

- OAK – Tyrone Wheatley 2-yard run (Sebastian Janikowski kick), 9:45. Raiders 28–14.
- OAK – Jerry Rice 37-yard pass from Rich Gannon (Sebastian Janikowski kick), 5:02. Raiders 35–14.
- OAK – Sebastian Janikowski 37-yard field goal, 0:43. Raiders 38–14.

**Fourth quarter**

- ARI – Arnold Jackson 11-yard pass from Jake Plummer (pass failed), 1:08. Raiders 38–20.
- OAK – Sebastian Janikowski 51-yard field goal, 1:56. Raiders 41–20.

**Top passers**

- OAK – Rich Gannon – 27/45, 340 yards, 3 TD, INT
- ARI – Jake Plummer – 16/34, 145 yards, 2 TD, 2 INT

**Top rushers**

- OAK – Charlie Garner – 16 rushes, 100 yards, TD
- ARI – Marcel Shipp – 16 rushes, 135 yards, TD

**Top receivers**

- OAK – Jerry Rice – 7 receptions, 110 yards, TD
- ARI – Frank Sanders – 3 receptions, 55 yards

**Team** – pass – rush – total – to

- OAK – 340 – 187 – 520 – 1
- ARI – 145 – 132 – 263 – 3

==== Week 13: vs. New York Jets ====
Week 13: New York Jets (6–5) at Oakland Raiders (7–4) – Game summary

| Quarter | 1 | 2 | 3 | 4 | Total |
|---|---|---|---|---|---|
| Jets | 0 | 10 | 0 | 10 | **20** |
| **Raiders** | 3 | 3 | 14 | 6 | **26** |

at Network Associates Coliseum, Oakland, California

- Date: December 2, 2002
- Game time: 9:00 pm
- Game weather: Clear, 57 °F (14 °C)
- Game attendance: 62,257
- Referee: Bernie Kukar (86)
- TV announcers (ABC): Al Michaels, John Madden and Melissa Stark
- Recap, Game Book

Game information

**First quarter**

- OAK – Sebastian Janikowski 23-yard field goal, 8:10. Raiders 3–0. **Drive: 11 plays, 62 yards, 4:48.**

**Second quarter**

- OAK – Sebastian Janikowski 48-yard field goal, 9:05. Raiders 6–0. **Drive: 9 plays, 35 yards, 4:24.**
- NYJ – Jerald Sowell 6-yard pass from Chad Pennington (John Hall kick), 2:05. Jets 7–6. **Drive: 4 plays, 80 yards, 2:03.**
- NYJ – John Hall 36-yard field goal, 0:06. Jets 10–6. **Drive: 4 plays, 11 yards, 0:37.**

**Third quarter**

- OAK – Jerry Rice 26-yard pass from Rich Gannon (Sebastian Janikowski kick), 11:06. Raiders 13–10. **Drive: 7 plays, 76 yards, 4:01.**
- OAK – Zack Crockett 1-yard run (Sebastian Janikowski kick), 3:00. Raiders 20–10. **Drive: 4 plays, 12 yards, 2:03.**

**Fourth quarter**

- NYJ – John Hall 45-yard field goal, 13:35. Raiders 20–13. **Drive: 9 plays, 43 yards, 5:18.**
- OAK – Sebastian Janikowski 36-yard field goal, 7:48. Raiders 23–13. **Drive: 10 plays, 57 yards, 4:30.**
- NYJ – Wayne Chrebet 13-yard pass from Chad Pennington (John Hall kick), 5:56. Raiders 23–20. **Drive: 7 plays, 71 yards, 2:12.**
- OAK – Sebastian Janikowski 29-yard field goal, 2:00. Raiders 26–20. **Drive: 10 plays, 63 yards, 4:20.**

**Top passers**

- NYJ – Chad Pennington – 22/34, 265 yards, 2 TD, INT
- OAK – Rich Gannon – 31/42, 342 yards, TD

**Top rushers**

- NYJ – Curtis Martin – 11 rushes, 26 yards
- OAK – Charlie Garner – 12 rushes, 52 yards

**Top receivers**

- NYJ – Laveranues Coles – 10 receptions, 158 yards
- OAK – Tim Brown – 8 receptions, 90 yards

==== Week 14: at San Diego Chargers ====
Week 14: Oakland Raiders (8–4) at San Diego Chargers (8–4) – Game summary

| Quarter | 1 | 2 | 3 | 4 | Total |
|---|---|---|---|---|---|
| **Raiders** | 10 | 3 | 7 | 7 | **27** |
| Chargers | 0 | 7 | 0 | 0 | **7** |

at Qualcomm Stadium, San Diego, California

- Date: December 8
- Game time: 1:15 p.m. PST
- Game weather: 67 °F (19 °C), relative humidity 61%, wind 8 mph
- Game attendance: 67,968
- Referee: Dick Hantak
- TV announcers (CBS): Kevin Harlan, Randy Cross and Beasley Reece
- Box score, Game Book

Game information

**First quarter**

- OAK – Charlie Garner 4-yard run (Sebastian Janikowski kick), 11:12. Raiders 7–0. **Drive: 6 plays, 36 yards, 3:48.**
- OAK – Sebastian Janikowski 51-yard field goal, 5:00. Raiders 10–0. **Drive: 6 plays, 41 yards, 3:18.**

**Second quarter**

- SDG – LaDainian Tomlinson 1-yard run (Steve Christie kick), 5:04. Raiders 10–7. **Drive: 7 plays, 45 yards, 4:10.**
- OAK – Sebastian Janikowski 20-yard field goal, 0:13. Raiders 13–7. **Drive: 10 plays, 49 yards, 1:37.**

**Third quarter**

- OAK – Zack Crockett 1-yard run (Sebastian Janikowski kick), 2:12. Raiders 20–7. **Drive: 8 plays, 87 yards, 5:02.**

**Fourth quarter**

- OAK – Tyrone Wheatley 4-yard run (Sebastian Janikowski kick), 7:25. Raiders 27–7. **Drive: 13 plays, 76 yards, 7:24.**

**Top passers**

- OAK – Rich Gannon – 26/41, 328 yards
- SDG – Drew Brees – 22/41, 239 yards, 3 INT

**Top rushers**

- OAK – Tyrone Wheatley – 9 rushes, 28 yards, TD
- SDG – LaDainian Tomlinson – 18 rushes, 57 yards, TD

**Top receivers**

- OAK – Jerry Rice – 7 receptions, 113 yards
- SDG – Eric Parker – 7 receptions, 96 yards

==== Week 15: at Miami Dolphins ====
Week 15: Oakland Raiders (9–4) at Miami Dolphins (8–5) – Game summary

| Quarter | 1 | 2 | 3 | 4 | Total |
|---|---|---|---|---|---|
| Raiders | 3 | 3 | 3 | 8 | **17** |
| **Dolphins** | 10 | 7 | 3 | 3 | **23** |

at Pro Player Stadium, Miami Gardens, Florida

- Date: December 15, 2002
- Game time: 1:00 p.m.
- Game weather: Sunny, 66 °F (19 °C)
- Game attendance: 73,572
- Referee: Terry McAulay (77)
- TV announcers (CBS): Greg Gumbel, Phil Simms, and Armen Keteyian
- Recap, Game Book

Game information

**First quarter**

- MIA – Olindo Mare 25-yard field goal, 10:24. Dolphins 3–0. **Drive: 5 plays, 49 yards, 2:24.**
- OAK – Sebastian Janikowski 26-yard field goal, 6:27. Tied 3–3. **Drive: 6 plays, 5 yards, 2:35.**
- MIA – Cris Carter 5-yard pass from Jay Fiedler (Olindo Mare kick), 4:01. Dolphins 10–3. **Drive: 5 plays, 46 yards, 2:26.**

**Second quarter**

- MIA – Travis Minor 4-yard run (Olindo Mare kick), 5:01. Dolphins 17–3. **Drive: 13 plays, 97 yards, 7:53.**
- OAK – Sebastian Janikowski 38-yard field goal, 0:45. Dolphins 17–6. **Drive: 9 plays, 48 yards, 4:16.**

**Third quarter**

- OAK – Sebastian Janikowski 45-yard field goal, 11:13. Dolphins 17–9. **Drive: 9 plays, 32 yards, 2:37.**
- MIA – Olindo Mare 27-yard field goal, 3:38. Dolphins 20–9. **Drive: 14 plays, 57 yards, 7:35.**

**Fourth quarter**

- OAK – Jerry Porter 20-yard pass from Rich Gannon (Rich Gannon–Jerry Porter pass), 14:52. Dolphins 20–17. **Drive: 8 plays, 80 yards, 3:46.**
- MIA – Olindo Mare 41-yard field goal, 2:28. Dolphins 23–17. **Drive: 5 plays, 16 yards, 2:18.**

**Top passers**

- OAK – Rich Gannon – 17/31, 204 yards, TD, INT
- MIA – Jay Fiedler – 21/32, 237 yards, TD

**Top rushers**

- OAK – Tyrone Wheatley – 4 rushes, 33 yards
- MIA – Ricky Williams – 27 rushes, 101 yards

**Top receivers**

- OAK – Doug Jolley – 3 receptions, 62 yards
- MIA – Chris Chambers – 7 receptions, 138 yards

==== Week 17: vs. Kansas City Chiefs ====
Week 17: Kansas City Chiefs (8–7) at Oakland Raiders (10–5) – Game summary

| Quarter | 1 | 2 | 3 | 4 | Total |
|---|---|---|---|---|---|
| Chiefs | 0 | 0 | 0 | 0 | **0** |
| **Raiders** | 0 | 14 | 3 | 7 | **24** |

at Network Associates Coliseum, Oakland, California

- Date: December 28
- Game time: 4:00 p.m. CST/2:00 p.m. PST
- Game weather: Rain, 50 °F (10 °C)
- Game attendance: 62,078
- Referee: Tony Corrente
- TV announcers (CBS): Dick Enberg, Dan Dierdorf, and Bonnie Bernstein
- Recap, Game Book

Game information

**First quarter**

- No scoring plays.

**Second quarter**

- OAK – Charlie Garner 1-yard run (Sebastian Janikowski kick), 13:11. Raiders 7–0. **Drive: 10 plays, 55 yards, 5:17.**
- OAK – Doug Jolley 15-yard pass from Rich Gannon (Sebastian Janikowski kick), 1:34. Raiders 14–0. **Drive: 14 plays, 80 yards, 6:42.**

**Third quarter**

- OAK – Sebastian Janikowski 27-yard field goal, 7:01. Raiders 17–0. **Drive: 16 plays, 57 yards, 7:59.**

**Fourth quarter**

- OAK – Zack Crockett 8-yard run (Sebastian Janikowski kick), 2:18. Raiders 24–0. **Drive: 10 plays, 70 yards, 5:57.**

**Top passers**

- KC – Trent Green – 15/32, 137 yards, INT
- OAK – Rich Gannon – 7/14, 79 yards, TD

**Top rushers**

- KC – Mike Cloud – 9 rushes, 23 yards
- OAK – Charlie Garner – 29 rushes, 135 yards, TD

**Top receivers**

- KC – Derrick Blaylock – 5 receptions, 47 yards
- OAK – Tim Brown – 2 receptions, 31 yards

=== Standings ===
==== Division ====
AFC West
| | W | L | T | PCT | DIV | CONF | PF | PA | STK |
|---|---|---|---|---|---|---|---|---|---|
| ^{(1)} Oakland Raiders | 11 | 5 | 0 | .688 | 4–2 | 9–3 | 450 | 304 | W2 |
| Denver Broncos | 9 | 7 | 0 | .563 | 3–3 | 5–7 | 392 | 344 | W1 |
| San Diego Chargers | 8 | 8 | 0 | .500 | 3–3 | 6–6 | 333 | 367 | L4 |
| Kansas City Chiefs | 8 | 8 | 0 | .500 | 2–4 | 6–6 | 467 | 399 | L1 |

==== Conference ====
AFC
| # | Team | Division | W | L | T | PCT | DIV | CONF | SOS | SOV |
|---|---|---|---|---|---|---|---|---|---|---|
**Division leaders**
| 1 (Note: Oakland finished ahead of Tennessee based on head-to-head victory.) | Oakland Raiders | West | 11 | 5 | 0 | .688 | 4–2 | 9–3 | .529 | .531 |
| 2 | Tennessee Titans | South | 11 | 5 | 0 | .688 | 6–0 | 9–3 | .479 | .474 |
| 3 | Pittsburgh Steelers | North | 10 | 5 | 1 | .656 | 6–0 | 8–4 | .486 | .451 |
| 4 (Note: N.Y. Jets finished ahead of New England based on win percentage in common games (8–4 to 7–5) after both finished ahead of Miami based on division record (4–2 to 2–4).) | New York Jets | East | 9 | 7 | 0 | .563 | 4–2 | 6–6 | .500 | .500 |
**Wild Cards**
| 5 | Indianapolis Colts | South | 10 | 6 | 0 | .625 | 4–2 | 8–4 | .479 | .400 |
| 6 (Note: Cleveland finished ahead of Denver and New England based on conference record (7–5 vs 5–7/6–6)) | Cleveland Browns | North | 9 | 7 | 0 | .563 | 3–3 | 7–5 | .486 | .413 |
**Did not qualify for the postseason**
| 7 (Note: Denver finished ahead of New England based on head-to-head victory.) | Denver Broncos | West | 9 | 7 | 0 | .563 | 3–3 | 5–7 | .527 | .486 |
| 8 (Note: New England finished ahead of Miami based on division record (4–2 to 2–4).) | New England Patriots | East | 9 | 7 | 0 | .563 | 4–2 | 6–6 | .525 | .455 |
| 9 | Miami Dolphins | East | 9 | 7 | 0 | .563 | 2–4 | 7–5 | .508 | .486 |
| 10 (Note: Buffalo finished ahead of San Diego based on head-to-head victory.) | Buffalo Bills | East | 8 | 8 | 0 | .500 | 2–4 | 5–7 | .473 | .352 |
| 11 (Note: San Diego finished ahead of Kansas City based on division record (3–3 to 2–4).) | San Diego Chargers | West | 8 | 8 | 0 | .500 | 3–3 | 6–6 | .492 | .453 |
| 12 | Kansas City Chiefs | West | 8 | 8 | 0 | .500 | 2–4 | 6–6 | .527 | .516 |
| 13 | Baltimore Ravens | North | 7 | 9 | 0 | .438 | 3–3 | 7–5 | .506 | .384 |
| 14 | Jacksonville Jaguars | South | 6 | 10 | 0 | .375 | 1–5 | 4–8 | .506 | .438 |
| 15 | Houston Texans | South | 4 | 12 | 0 | .250 | 1–5 | 2–10 | .518 | .492 |
| 16 | Cincinnati Bengals | North | 2 | 14 | 0 | .125 | 0–6 | 1–11 | .537 | .406 |
**Tiebreakers** (Note: When breaking ties for three or more teams under the NFL's rules, they are first broken within divisions, then comparing only the highest ranked remaining team from each division.)

== Postseason ==
=== Schedule ===
| Round | Date | Opponent (seed) | Result | Record | Venue | Attendance | Recap |
|---|---|---|---|---|---|---|---|
| Wild Card | First-round bye | | | | | | |
| Divisional | January 12 | New York Jets (4) | W 30–10 | 1–0 | Network Associates Coliseum | 62,207 | Recap |
| AFC Championship | January 19 | Tennessee Titans (2) | W 41–24 | 2–0 | Network Associates Coliseum | 62,544 | Recap |
| Super Bowl XXXVII | January 26 | vs. Tampa Bay Buccaneers (N2) | L 21–48 | 2–1 | Qualcomm Stadium | 67,603 | Recap |

=== Game summaries ===
==== AFC Divisional Playoffs: vs. (4) New York Jets ====
AFC Divisional Playoffs: (4) New York Jets at (1) Oakland Raiders – Game summary

| Quarter | 1 | 2 | 3 | 4 | Total |
|---|---|---|---|---|---|
| Jets | 3 | 7 | 0 | 0 | 10 |
| Raiders | 3 | 7 | 7 | 13 | 30 |

at Network Associates Coliseum, Oakland, California

- Date: January 12, 2003
- Game time: 4:30 pm
- Game weather: Overcast, 61 °F (16 °C)
- Game attendance: 62,207
- Referee: Dick Hantak (105)
- TV announcers (CBS): Greg Gumbel, Phil Simms and Armen Keteyian
- Recap, Game Book

Game information

First quarter

- NYJ – John Hall 38-yard field goal, 11:07. Jets 3–0. Drive: 8 plays, 45 yards, 4:02.
- OAK – Sebastian Janikowski 29-yard field goal, 6:12. Tied 3–3. Drive: 9 plays, 53 yards, 5:10.

Second quarter

- OAK – Zack Crockett 1-yard run (Sebastian Janikowski kick), 13:49. Raiders 10–3. Drive: 6 plays, 27 yards, 2:41.
- NYJ – Jerald Sowell 1-yard pass from Chad Pennington (John Hall kick), 0:37. Tied 10–10. Drive: 16 plays, 81 yards, 7:46.

Third quarter

- OAK – Jerry Porter 29-yard pass from Rich Gannon (Sebastian Janikowski kick), 4:30. Raiders 17–10. Drive: 2 plays, 45 yards, 0:30.

Fourth quarter

- OAK – Jerry Rice 9-yard pass from Rich Gannon (Sebastian Janikowski kick), 14:50. Raiders 24–10. Drive: 4 plays, 65 yards, 2:03.
- OAK – Sebastian Janikowski 34-yard field goal, 8:07. Raiders 27–10. Drive: 7 plays, 46 yards, 3:27.
- OAK – Sebastian Janikowski 31-yard field goal, 3:00. Raiders 30–10. Drive: 8 plays, 37 yards, 4:28.

Top passers

- NYJ – Chad Pennington – 21/47, 183 yards, TD, 2 INT
- OAK – Rich Gannon – 20/30, 283 yards, 2 TD, INT

Top rushers

- NYJ – Curtis Martin – 16 rushes, 74 yards
- OAK – Charlie Garner – 21 rushes, 93 yards

Top receivers

- NYJ – Santana Moss – 4 receptions, 45 yards
- OAK – Jerry Porter – 6 receptions, 123 yards, TD

==== AFC Championship: vs. (2) Tennessee Titans ====
AFC Championship Game: (2) Tennessee Titans at (1) Oakland Raiders – Game summary

| Quarter | 1 | 2 | 3 | 4 | Total |
|---|---|---|---|---|---|
| Titans | 7 | 10 | 7 | 0 | 24 |
| Raiders | 14 | 10 | 3 | 14 | 41 |

at Network Associates Coliseum, Oakland, California

- Game time: 6:30 p.m. EST/3:30 p.m. PST
- Game weather: Clear, 52 °F (11 °C)
- Game attendance: 62,544
- Referee: Ed Hochuli
- TV announcers (CBS): Greg Gumbel, Phil Simms, Armen Keteyian, and Bonnie Bernstein

The Raiders defeated the Titans and advanced to their first Super Bowl since Super Bowl XVIII, when they were based in Los Angeles. As of 2025, this was the last time Raiders won a playoff game as they would not return to the playoffs again until 2016 and would be the last playoff game to be held at the Oakland Coliseum. The Raiders were approved to relocate to Las Vegas and played their inaugural Las Vegas season in 2020.

Heavy Metal band Metallica performed an unannounced pregame concert prior to kickoff and the game's national Anthem was performed by Joe Satriani.

Until the 2019–20 NFL playoffs, this was the last AFC championship game which did not include the Baltimore Ravens, Denver Broncos, Indianapolis Colts, New England Patriots or Pittsburgh Steelers.

==== Super Bowl XXXVII: vs. (N2) Tampa Bay Buccaneers ====
Super Bowl XXXVII: (A1) Oakland Raiders vs. (N2) Tampa Bay Buccaneers – Game summary

| Quarter | 1 | 2 | 3 | 4 | Total |
|---|---|---|---|---|---|
| Raiders (AFC) | 3 | 0 | 6 | 12 | 21 |
| Buccaneers (NFC) | 3 | 17 | 14 | 14 | 48 |

at Qualcomm Stadium, San Diego, California

- Date: January 26, 2003
- Game time: 3:26 p.m. PST
- Game weather: Sunny, 81 °F (27 °C)
- Game attendance: 67,603
- Referee: Bill Carollo
- Recap

Game information
First quarter
- OAK – Sebastian Janikowski 40-yard field goal, 10:40. Raiders 3–0. Drive: 7 plays, 14 yards, 2:55.
- TB – Martín Gramática 31-yard field goal, 7:51. Tied 3–3. Drive: 9 plays, 58 yards, 2:49.

Second quarter

- TB – Martín Gramática 43-yard field goal, 11:16. Buccaneers 6–3. Drive: 9 plays, 26 yards, 3:53.
- TB – Mike Alstott 2-yard run (Martín Gramática kick), 6:24. Buccaneers 13–3. Drive: 4 plays, 27 yards, 2:02.
- TB – Keenan McCardell 5-yard pass from Brad Johnson (Martín Gramática kick), 0:30. Buccaneers 20–3. Drive: 10 plays, 77 yards, 3:15.

Third quarter

- TB – Keenan McCardell 8-yard pass from Brad Johnson (Martín Gramática kick), 5:30. Buccaneers 27–3. Drive: 14 plays, 89 yards, 7:52.
- TB – Dwight Smith 44-yard interception return (Martín Gramática kick), 4:47. Buccaneers 34–3.
- OAK – Jerry Porter 39-yard pass from Rich Gannon (pass failed), 2:14. Buccaneers 34–9. Drive: 8 plays, 82 yards, 2:33.

Fourth quarter

- OAK – Eric Johnson 13-yard return of blocked punt (pass failed), 14:16. Buccaneers 34–15.
- OAK – Jerry Rice 48-yard pass from Rich Gannon (pass failed), 6:06. Buccaneers 34–21. Drive: 8 plays, 78 yards, 2:56.
- TB – Derrick Brooks 44-yard interception return (Martín Gramática kick), 1:18. Buccaneers 41–21.
- TB – Dwight Smith 50-yard interception return (Martín Gramática kick), 0:02. Buccaneers 48–21.

== Awards and honors ==
- Rich Gannon, Bert Bell Award
- Rich Gannon, NFL MVP
