= Jarmar Julien =

American football player (born 1979)

No. 27
- Position: Running back

Personal information
- Born: December 11, 1979 (age 46); San Jose, California, U.S.
- Listed height: 5 ft 11 in (1.80 m)
- Listed weight: 240 lb (109 kg)

Career information
- High school: Oak Grove (San Jose)
- College: San Jose State
- NFL draft: 2002: undrafted

Career history
- Kansas City Chiefs (2002); Oakland Raiders (2005)*
- * Offseason or practice squad member only

Career NFL statistics
- Total tackles: 1
- Stats at Pro Football Reference

Jarmar Antwion Julien (born December 11, 1979) is an American former professional football player who was a running back for one season with the Kansas City Chiefs of the National Football League (NFL) in 2002. He played college football for the San Jose State Spartans.

== Early life and college career ==
Born and raised in San Jose, California, Julien graduated from Oak Grove High School. As a senior, Julien was honorable mention USA Today All-USA in 1997.

Julien enrolled at San Jose State University in 1998 and began playing on the San Jose State Spartans football team in 1999 as a starter at cornerback and strong safety, with 21 total tackles and four passes defended. On offense, he made one catch for eight yards, and he returned 12 kickoffs for 158 yards. In 2000, Julien moved to offense as tailback, rushing for 561 yards and eight touchdowns. He also had 87 receiving yards and a touchdown on eight catches, along with 501 kick return yards. Julien had a breakout season in 2001 rushing for 820 yards and 12 touchdowns and receiving for 108 yards, earning second-team All-Western Athletic Conference honors.

== Pro football career ==
Julien skipped his final year of football eligibility to declare for the 2002 NFL draft. However, he was not selected, and he signed with the Kansas City Chiefs as an undrafted free agent on April 29, 2002. After missing the preseason and the early regular season with an ankle injury, Julien spent time on the practice squad before being promoted to the active roster in December, and he played on special teams in the final two games of the season, making on tackle. Julien was released after the 2003 preseason.

Julien attempted a comeback in football with the Oakland Raiders, being allocated to NFL Europe in February 2005 before being cut a month later.
