= Ryan Sims =

American football player (born 1980)

No. 90, 98, 97
- Position: Defensive tackle

Personal information
- Born: May 4, 1980 (age 46); Spartanburg, South Carolina, U.S.
- Listed height: 6 ft 4 in (1.93 m)
- Listed weight: 315 lb (143 kg)

Career information
- High school: Paul M. Dorman (Roebuck, South Carolina)
- College: North Carolina (1998–2001)
- NFL draft: 2002: 1st round, 6th overall pick

Career history
- Kansas City Chiefs (2002–2006); Tampa Bay Buccaneers (2007–2010); Seattle Seahawks (2011)*
- * Offseason or practice squad member only

Awards and highlights
- Third-team All-American (2001); First-team All-ACC (2001)

Career NFL statistics
- Total tackles: 147
- Sacks: 8.5
- Forced fumbles: 1
- Fumble recoveries: 2
- Interceptions: 1
- Stats at Pro Football Reference

Ryan O'Neal Sims (born May 4, 1980) is an American former professional football player who was a defensive tackle in the National Football League (NFL). He played college football for the North Carolina Tar Heels. Sims' professional career began in 2002 with the Kansas City Chiefs, for whom he played through the end of the 2006 season. He was also a member of the Tampa Bay Buccaneers and Seattle Seahawks.

== Professional career ==
=== Kansas City Chiefs ===
Sims played college football for the University of North Carolina and was the sixth overall pick in first round of the 2002 NFL draft. Sims was a college teammate of the Carolina Panthers defensive end Julius Peppers. He graduated from Dorman High School in Spartanburg, SC. Sims is a member of Phi Beta Sigma fraternity and was initiated into the Xi Gamma chapter while at UNC-Chapel Hill during the Spring 2000 semester.

During his tenure with Kansas City, Sims played in a total of 74 games and notched 54 tackles, 5 sacks, and 1 interception.

In 2006, Herm Edwards took over as coach of the Chiefs, and Sims saw his playing time reduced. He is remembered as one of the Chiefs Worst Draft Busts of all time.

=== Tampa Bay Buccaneers ===
He was traded to the Tampa Bay Buccaneers on May 1, 2007, for an undisclosed future draft pick (which would become a 2009 NFL draft 7th round pick). On February 19, 2009, Sims signed a four-year/$8 million contract with the Buccaneers. On November 23, 2010, the Buccaneers released Sims. For the season, Sims totaled four tackles with no sacks in six games for Tampa Bay.

=== Seattle Seahawks ===
Sims signed with the Seattle Seahawks on July 31, 2011, but was released on August 20.

=== NFL season ===
Year	Team	Games	Combined tackles	Tackles	Assisted tackles	Sacks	Forced fumbles	Fumble recoveries	Fumble return yards	Interceptions	Interception return yards	Yards per interception return	Longest interception return	Interceptions returned for touchdown	Passes defended
2002	KC	6	6	5	1	0.0	0	0	0	0	0	0	0	0	1
2003	KC	16	38	34	4	3.0	1	1	0	1	8	8	8	0	1
2004	KC	15	15	13	2	2.0	0	0	0	0	0	0	0	0	0
2005	KC	6	8	8	0	0.0	0	0	0	0	0	0	0	0	0
2006	KC	16	7	4	3	0.0	0	0	0	0	0	0	0	0	0
2007	TB	9	16	11	5	1.0	0	0	0	0	0	0	0	0	0
2008	TB	15	16	9	7	1.5	0	0	0	0	0	0	0	0	2
2009	TB	16	33	25	8	1.0	0	1	0	0	0	0	0	0	1
2010	TB	6	4	3	1	0.0	0	0	0	0	0	0	0	0	0
Career		105	143	112	31	8.5	1	2	0	1	8	8	8	0	5
