= Charlie Garner =

American football player (born 1972)

No. 25, 30
- Position: Running back

Personal information
- Born: February 13, 1972 (age 54); Falls Church, Virginia, U.S.
- Listed height: 5 ft 10 in (1.78 m)
- Listed weight: 190 lb (86 kg)

Career information
- High school: J.E.B. Stuart (Falls Church)
- College: Scottsdale CC (1990–1991); Tennessee (1992–1993)
- NFL draft: 1994: 2nd round, 42nd overall pick

Career history
- Philadelphia Eagles (1994–1998); San Francisco 49ers (1999–2000); Oakland Raiders (2001–2003); Tampa Bay Buccaneers (2004)

Awards and highlights
- Pro Bowl (2000); Second-team All-SEC (1993)

Career NFL statistics
- Rushing yards: 7,097
- Rushing average: 4.6
- Rushing touchdowns: 39
- Receptions: 419
- Receiving yards: 3,711
- Receiving touchdowns: 12
- Stats at Pro Football Reference

Charlie Garner III (born February 13, 1972) is an American former professional football player who was a running back in the National Football League (NFL). He played college football for the Tennessee Volunteers. Garner was selected by the Philadelphia Eagles in the second round of the 1994 NFL draft. He also played in the NFL for the San Francisco 49ers, Oakland Raiders, and Tampa Bay Buccaneers.

== Early life ==
Garner grew up in Falls Church, Virginia and attended J.E.B. Stuart High School (now known as Justice High School). His senior year, he was selected first-team All-Metropolitan (Northern Virginia, Suburban Maryland and the District of Columbia), first-team All-State, and named Virginia's player of the year after rushing for more than 2,000 yards and 38 touchdowns.

On October 16, 2009, Garner had his JEB Stuart High School number 30 jersey retired during a halftime ceremony.

== College career ==
In 1991, Garner set junior college records for rushing yards in a game (430) and yards in two consecutive games (765) at Scottsdale (Ariz.) Community College. Garner then transferred to the University of Tennessee and graduated with a business degree. He is notable for starting ahead of fellow NFL RB James Stewart at Tennessee.

- 1992: 154 carries for 928 yards with 2 TD. 5 catches for 25 yards.
- 1993: 159 carries for 1161 yards with 8 TD. 12 catches for 81 yards.

== Professional career ==
Pre-draft measurables
Height	Weight	Arm length	Hand span
5 ft 9 1/8 in (1.76 m)	182 lb (83 kg)	31 1/2 in (0.80 m)	9 3/4 in (0.25 m)

Garner was drafted by the Philadelphia Eagles in the second round (42nd overall) of the 1994 NFL draft.

He was a multi-talented running back and an excellent receiver. In Week 6 of the 1995 season, he had nine carries for 120 yards and three touchdowns in the win over Washington. In the 2002–03 season with the Oakland Raiders, he was the team's leading rusher with 962 yards and seven touchdowns, while also leading all NFL running backs in receiving with 91 receptions for 941 yards and another four touchdowns. The 91 receptions for 941 yards were the fifth and fourth most in NFL history by a running back, respectively. He also previously held the record for most rush yards in a game by a 49er (201) later broken by Frank Gore. The crossed forearm symbol he displayed after scoring was a tribute to his neighborhood of Bailey's Crossroads, Virginia.

In August 2005, Garner was released by the Tampa Bay Buccaneers after suffering a knee injury the previous season. During his career, he rushed 1,537 times for 7,097 yards scoring 39 touchdowns, caught 419 passes for 3,711 yards and 12 touchdowns.

During his career, Garner was nicknamed "IO," which stood for "Instant Offense," because he excelled at both rushing and receiving.

== Personal life ==
In 2017, post football, doctors told Garner they believe he has chronic traumatic encephalopathy, which in recent years has become a plague for former NFL players. It can only be diagnosed post-mortem.

"I don't have all my faculties anymore," Garner said. "I can't remember things. When I go to the mall or grocery store, I have to take one of my kids with me to remember where the car is parked. I have trouble remembering conversations I had five minutes ago. Bright lights bother me. I just don't feel right all the time."

== NFL career statistics ==
Year	Team	GP	Rushing						Receiving						Fumbles	
Year	Team	GP	Att	Yds	Avg	Lng	TD	FD	Rec	Yds	Avg	Lng	TD	FD	Fum	Lost
1994	PHI	10	109	399	3.7	28	3	24	8	74	9.3	28	0	3	3	2
1995	PHI	15	108	588	5.4	55	6	25	10	61	6.1	29	0	4	2	1
1996	PHI	15	66	346	5.2	46	1	16	14	92	6.6	13	0	4	1	1
1997	PHI	16	116	547	4.7	26	3	31	24	225	9.4	27	0	9	1	1
1998	PHI	10	96	381	4.0	40	4	18	19	110	5.8	21	0	5	1	1
1999	SF	16	241	1,229	5.1	53	4	51	56	535	9.6	53	2	22	3	1
2000	SF	16	258	1,142	4.4	42	7	53	68	647	9.5	62	3	28	4	3
2001	OAK	16	211	839	4.0	38	1	31	72	578	8.0	27	2	28	2	2
2002	OAK	16	182	962	5.3	36	7	47	91	941	10.3	69	4	44	0	0
2003	OAK	14	120	553	4.6	33	3	27	48	386	8.0	46	1	15	1	0
2004	TB	3	30	111	3.7	25	0	3	9	62	6.9	31	0	1	0	0
Career		147	1,537	7,097	4.6	55	39	326	419	3,711	8.9	69	12	163	18	12
