= Tony Newson =

American football player (born 1979)

No. 66, 51
- Position: Linebacker

Personal information
- Born: September 11, 1979 (age 47); Las Vegas, Nevada, U.S.
- Listed height: 6 ft 1 in (1.85 m)
- Listed weight: 247 lb (112 kg)

Career information
- High school: Cheyenne (North Las Vegas, Nevada)
- College: Utah State (1997–2001)
- NFL draft: 2002: undrafted

Career history
- Kansas City Chiefs (2002–2003); St. Louis Rams (2004–2005); Las Vegas Gladiators (2007)

Awards and highlights
- Second-team All-Big West (1999)

Career NFL statistics
- Games played: 7
- Tackles: 3
- Stats at Pro Football Reference
- Stats at ArenaFan.com

Antonio Roderick Newson (born September 11, 1979) is an American former professional football linebacker who played for the Kansas City Chiefs and St. Louis Rams of the National Football League (NFL). He played college football for the Utah State Aggies. Newson also had a stint with the Las Vegas Gladiators of the Arena Football League (AFL).

== Early life ==
Newson was born on September 11, 1979, in Las Vegas, Nevada. He attended Cheyenne High School in North Las Vegas, Nevada.

== College career ==
Newson played college football for the Utah State Aggies from 1997 to 2001 and was a four-year letterman. In 1999, he earned second-team All-Big West honors. Newson missed the 2000 season due to a shoulder injury and used his medical redshirt to retain eligibility. He started in 16 games and had 198 tackles during his career.

== Professional career ==
=== Kansas City Chiefs ===
After going undrafted in the 2002 NFL draft, Newson signed with the Kansas City Chiefs as an undrafted free agent. On September 1, 2002, he was waived and signed to the practice squad. On December 4, Newson was elevated to the active roster and played in the final four games, recording two tackles. On September 1, 2003, he was released by the team.

=== St. Louis Rams ===
On March 11, 2004, the St. Louis Rams signed Newson. On September 6, he was waived and signed to the practice squad. On September 16, Newson was promoted to the active roster. He played in three games where he made one tackle. On October 19, Newson was released and signed to the practice squad. On January 19, 2005, he signed a reserve/futures contract with the team. On June 1, 2005, Newson was released.

=== Las Vegas Gladiators ===
In 2007, Newson played for the Las Vegas Gladiators of the Arena Football League (AFL). In two games, he had four tackles.
