= 2001 Kansas City Chiefs season =

NFL team season

- Owner: Lamar Hunt
- General manager: Carl Peterson
- Head coach: Dick Vermeil
- Offensive coordinator: Al Saunders
- Defensive coordinator: Greg Robinson
- Home stadium: Arrowhead Stadium

Results
- Record: 6–10
- Division place: 4th AFC West
- Playoffs: Did not qualify
- All-Pros: 2: RB Priest Holmes (1st team); TE Tony Gonzalez (1st team)
- Pro Bowlers: 3: RB Priest Holmes; TE Tony Gonzalez; G Will Shields

The 2001 season was the Kansas City Chiefs' 32nd in the National Football League (NFL) and their 42nd overall. It was their first year under head coach Dick Vermeil and 13th under general manager Carl Peterson. They finished the regular season with a 6–10 record.

Along with new coaches joining the team, new additions appeared on the Chiefs' roster, including running back Priest Holmes and quarterback Trent Green. Vermeil began to install a powerful offense similar to the one he installed in St. Louis to win Super Bowl XXXIV.

== Offseason ==
Additions	Subtractions
QB Trent Green (Rams)	P Todd Sauerbrun (Panthers)
RB Priest Holmes (Ravens)	QB Elvis Grbac (Ravens)
LB Glenn Cadrez (Broncos)	DT Chester McGlockton (Broncos)
CB Ray Crockett (Broncos)	TE Troy Drayton (Packers)
C Casey Wiegmann (Bears)	FB Donnell Bennett (Redskins)
DE Rich Owens (Dolphins)	G Dave Szott (Redskins)
P Dan Stryzinski (Falcons)	WR Kevin Lockett (Redskins)
CB George McCullough (Titans)	CB Carlton Gray (Bengals)
	S Jason Belser (Colts)

=== Draft ===
2001 Kansas City Chiefs draft
Round	Pick	Player	Position	College	Notes
3	75	Eric Downing	Defensive tackle	Syracuse	
3	77	Marvin Minnis	Wide receiver	Florida State	
4	107	Monty Beisel	Linebacker	Kansas State	
4	108	George Layne	Fullback	TCU	
5	141	Billy Baber	Tight end	Virginia	
5	150	Derrick Blaylock	Running back	Stephen F. Austin State	
6	176	Alex Sulfsted	Tackle	Miami (OH)	
7	212	Shaunard Harts	Safety	Boise State	
7	243	Terdell Sands	Defensive tackle	Tennessee–Chattanooga	
Made roster

=== Undrafted free agents ===
2001 undrafted free agents of note
Player	Position	College
Ian Allen	Guard	Purdue
Dyshod Carter	Cornerback	Kansas State
Ryan Helming	Quarterback	Northern Iowa
Dave Klemic	Wide receiver	Northeastern
J. J. Moses	Wide receiver	Iowa State
Wes Robertson	Linebacker	Rutgers
Lawrence Tynes	Kicker	Troy State

== Personnel ==
=== Staff ===
2001 Kansas City Chiefs staff
Front office: Founder – Lamar Hunt; President/general manager/chief executive officer – Carl Peterson; Chairman of the board – Jack Steadman; Executive vice president/assistant general manager – Dennis Thum; Vice president of football operations/player personnel – Lynn Stiles; Director of football administration – Mike White; Director of pro personnel – Bill Kuharich; Head coaches: Head coach – Dick Vermeil; Assistant head coach/offensive coordinator – Al Saunders; Offensive coaches: Quarterbacks – Terry Shea; Running backs – James Saxon; Wide receivers – Charlie Joiner; Tight ends – Keith Rowen; Offensive line – Mike Solari; Assistant offensive line – Irv Eatman; Offensive assistant/quality control – Jason Verduzco	Defensive coaches: Defensive coordinator – Greg Robinson; Defensive line – Carl Hairston; Defensive line – Bob Karmelowicz; Linebackers – Joe Vitt; Defensive backs – Peter Giunta; Defensive assistant/quality control – Darvin Wallis; Special teams coaches: Special teams – Frank Gansz Jr; Strength and conditioning: Strength and conditioning – Jeff Hurd; Assistant strength and conditioning – Billy Long

=== Roster ===
2001 Kansas City Chiefs roster
Quarterbacks (QB): 15 Todd Collins; 7 Joe Germaine; 10 Trent Green; Running backs (RB): 23 Derrick Blaylock; 34 Mike Cloud; 20 Dante Hall; 31 Priest Holmes; 49 Tony Richardson FB; Wide receivers (WR): 82 Derrick Alexander; 11 Reggie Jones; 87 Eddie Kennison; 81 Snoop Minnis; Tight ends (TE): 45 Billy Baber; 88 Tony Gonzalez; 85 Mikhael Ricks	Offensive linemen (OL): 72 Darnell Alford T; 69 Victor Allotey G; 73 Willie Jones T; 66 Victor Riley T; 68 Will Shields G; 70 Marcus Spears G/T; 76 John Tait T; 54 Brian Waters C/G; 62 Casey Wiegmann C; 60 Donald Willis G; Defensive linemen (DL): 99 Duane Clemons DE; 79 Eric Downing DT; 98 Eric Hicks DE; 94 Nate Hobgood-Chittick DT; 75 Norris McCleary DT; 97 Rich Owens DE; 95 Derrick Ransom DT; 90 Tyrone Williams DE/DT	Linebackers (LB): 50 Larry Atkins OLB; 96 Monty Beisel MLB; 56 Lewis Bush MLB; 51 Glenn Cadrez OLB; 59 Donnie Edwards OLB; 53 Marvcus Patton MLB; 55 Gary Stills OLB; Defensive backs (DB): 26 Taje Allen CB; 24 William Bartee CB; 29 Jason Belser FS; 39 Ray Crockett CB; 40 Corey Harris CB; 42 Shaunard Harts FS; 27 Bracy Walker SS; 44 Eric Warfield CB; 25 Greg Wesley SS; 21 Jerome Woods FS; Special teams (ST): 83 Kendall Gammon LS; 2 Todd Peterson K; 4 Dan Stryzinski P	Practice squad: 17 John Capel WR; 46 Ahmad Hawkins CB; 5 Dave Klemic WR; 9 J. J. Moses WR; Reserve: 93 John Browning DT (IR); 89 Jason Dunn TE (IR); 57 Mike Maslowski LB (IR); 84 Sylvester Morris WR (PUP); 80 Larry Parker WR (IR); 91 Terdell Sands DT (NF-Inj.); Rookies in italics 53 active, 6 reserve, 4 practice squad

== Preseason ==
=== Schedule ===
Week	Date	Opponent	Result	Record	Venue	Recap
1	August 12	Washington Redskins	W 20–0	1–0	Arrowhead Stadium	Recap
2	August 18	Chicago Bears	W 10–9	2–0	Arrowhead Stadium	Recap
3	August 23	at Jacksonville Jaguars	L 23–28	2–1	Alltel Stadium	Recap
4	August 31	at St. Louis Rams	L 17–21	2–2	Trans World Dome	Recap

=== Game summaries ===
==== Week 1: vs. Washington Redskins ====
Week 1: Washington Redskins at Kansas City Chiefs – Game summary

Quarter	1	2	3	4	Total
Redskins	0	0	0	0	0
Chiefs	10	10	0	0	20

at Arrowhead Stadium, Kansas City, Missouri

- Date: August 12
- Game time: 7:30 p.m. CDT
- Game weather: Clear, 86 °F (30 °C)
- Game attendance: 75,730
- Referee: Larry Nemmers
- Recap, Game Book

Game information

First quarter

- KC – Todd Peterson 23-yard field goal, 4:27. Chiefs 3–0. Drive: 14 plays, 83 yards, 6:41.
- KC – Derrick Mayes 29-yard pass from Trent Green (Todd Peterson kick), 0:43. Chiefs 10–0. Drive: 3 plays, 61 yards, 1:52.

Second quarter

- KC – Dante Hall 92-yard punt return (Lawrence Tynes kick), 12:04. Chiefs 17–0.
- KC – Lawrence Tynes 22-yard field goal, 1:57. Chiefs 20–0. Drive: 16 plays, 70 yards, 8:35.

Third quarter

- No scoring plays.

Fourth quarter

- No scoring plays.

Top passers

- WAS – Sage Rosenfels – 7/17, 41 yards
- KC – Todd Collins – 12/18, 137 yards

Top rushers

- WAS – Ki-Jana Carter – 7 rushes, 12 yards
- KC – Frank Moreau – 9 rushes, 39 yards

Top receivers

- WAS – Darnerien McCants – 1 reception, 28 yards
- KC – Larry Parker – 4 receptions, 63 yards

==== Week 2: vs. Chicago Bears ====
Week 2: Chicago Bears at Kansas City Chiefs – Game summary

Quarter	1	2	3	4	Total
Bears	0	3	3	3	9
Chiefs	0	7	3	0	10

at Arrowhead Stadium, Kansas City, Missouri

- Date: August 18
- Game time: 7:30 p.m. CDT
- Game weather: Clear, 80 °F (27 °C)
- Game attendance: 77,618
- Referee: Terry McAulay
- Recap, Game Book

Game information

First quarter

- No scoring plays.

Second quarter

- KC – Mikhael Ricks 30-yard pass from Trent Green (Todd Peterson kick), 11:20. Chiefs 7–0. Drive: 10 plays, 89 yards, 4:59.
- CHI – Paul Edinger 23-yard field goal, 4:04. Chiefs 7–3. Drive: 13 plays, 64 yards, 7:16.

Third quarter

- CHI – Paul Edinger 45-yard field goal, 10:33. Chiefs 7–6. Drive: 4 plays, 3 yards, 0:50.
- KC – Todd Peterson 43-yard field goal, 6:09. Chiefs 10–6. Drive: 9 plays, 45 yards, 4:24.

Fourth quarter

- CHI – Paul Edinger 35-yard field goal, 14:16. Chiefs 10–9. Drive: 6 plays, 20 yards, 2:18.

Top passers

- CHI – Shane Matthews – 10/18, 94 yards
- KC – Trent Green – 7/12, 104 yards, TD

Top rushers

- CHI – Skip Hicks – 14 rushes, 38 yards
- KC – Derrick Blaylock – 4 rushes, 23 yards

Top receivers

- CHI – James Allen – 3 receptions, 37 yards
- KC – Derrick Alexander – 2 receptions, 35 yards

==== Week 3: at Jacksonville Jaguars ====
Week 3: Kansas City Chiefs at Jacksonville Jaguars – Game summary

Quarter	1	2	3	4	Total
Chiefs	3	17	3	0	23
Jaguars	7	0	14	7	28

at Alltel Stadium, Jacksonville, Florida

- Date: August 23
- Game time: 7:30 p.m. EDT/6:30 p.m. CDT
- Game weather: 82 °F (28 °C)
- Game attendance: 48,623
- Referee: Bill Carollo
- Recap, Game Book

Game information

First quarter

- KC – Todd Peterson 41-yard field goal, 5:47. Chiefs 3–0. Drive: 7 plays, 17 yards, 3:08.
- JAX – Jimmy Smith 27-yard pass from Mark Brunell (Mike Hollis kick), 4:05. Jaguars 7–3. Drive: 4 plays, 72 yards, 1:42.

Second quarter

- KC – Todd Peterson 49-yard field goal, 12:45. Jaguars 7–6. Drive: 11 plays, 44 yards, 6:19.
- KC – Snoop Minnis 7-yard pass from Trent Green (Todd Peterson kick), 6:24. Chiefs 13–7. Drive: 11 plays, 74 yards, 4:03.
- KC – Mikhael Ricks 5-yard pass from Todd Collins (Todd Peterson kick), 0:13. Chiefs 20–7. Drive: 9 plays, 65 yards, 2:44.

Third quarter

- JAX – Damon Jones 12-yard pass from Mark Brunell (Mike Hollis kick), 9:28. Chiefs 20–14. Drive: 11 plays, 71 yards, 5:32.
- KC – Todd Peterson 36-yard field goal, 0:43. Chiefs 23–14. Drive: 11 plays, 37 yards, 5:25.
- JAX – R. Jay Soward 33-yard pass from Jonathan Quinn (Mike Hollis kick), 0:00. Chiefs 23–21. Drive: 2 plays, 70 yards, 0:43.

Fourth quarter

- JAX – Alvis Whitted 58-yard pass from Jamie Martin (Mike Hollis kick), 5:58. Jaguars 28–23. Drive: 1 play, 58 yards, 0:11.

Top passers

- KC – Trent Green – 14/22, 166 yards, TD, INT
- JAX – Mark Brunell – 10/15, 154 yards, 2 TD

Top rushers

- KC – Frank Moreau – 8 rushes, 24 yards
- JAX – Fred Taylor – 13 rushes, 27 yards

Top receivers

- KC – Snoop Minnis – 6 receptions, 101 yards, TD
- JAX – Jimmy Smith – 5 receptions, 78 yards, TD

==== Week 4: at St. Louis Rams ====
Week 4: Kansas City Chiefs at St. Louis Rams – Game summary

Quarter	1	2	3	4	Total
Chiefs	0	14	3	0	17
Rams	0	0	7	14	21

at Trans World Dome, St. Louis, Missouri

- Date: August 31
- Game time: 7:00 p.m. CDT
- Game weather: None (indoor stadium)
- Game attendance: 65,463
- Referee: Mark Gentry
- Recap, Game Book

Game information

First quarter

- No scoring plays.

Second quarter

- KC – Tony Richardson 3-yard run (Todd Peterson kick), 12:29. Chiefs 7–0. Drive: 7 plays, 45 yards, 3:30.
- KC – Mike Cloud 1-yard run (Todd Peterson kick), 7:54. Chiefs 14–0. Drive: 6 plays, 51 yards, 3:04.

Third quarter

- KC – Todd Peterson 24-yard field goal, 9:36. Chiefs 17–0. Drive: 9 plays, 62 yards, 4:13.
- STL – Tommy Polley 83-yard interception return (Jeff Wilkins kick), 0:58. Chiefs 17–7.

Fourth quarter

- STL – Trung Canidate 2-yard run (Jeff Wilkins kick), 10:31. Chiefs 17–14. Drive: 8 plays, 26 yards, 4:21.
- STL – Tyoka Jackson 35-yard fumble return (Jeff Wilkins kick), 8:12. Rams 21–17.

Top passers

- KC – Bubby Brister – 10/22, 118 yards, 3 INT
- STL – Marc Bulger – 18/34, 156 yards

Top rushers

- KC – Tony Richardson – 5 rushes, 23 yards, TD
- STL – Ricky Proehl – 1 rush, 8 yards

Top receivers

- KC – Larry Parker – 4 receptions, 68 yards
- STL – Az-Zahir Hakim – 3 receptions, 40 yards

== Regular season ==
=== Schedule ===
Week	Date	Opponent	Result	Record	Venue	Recap
1	September 9	**Oakland Raiders**	**L** 24–27	0–1	Arrowhead Stadium	Recap
2 (Note: The Chiefs were originally scheduled to play the Seattle Seahawks during Week 2 of the original NFL schedule (September 16) at Husky Stadium in Seattle. However, due to the September 11 attacks, the game was rescheduled to Week 17.)	September 23	New York Giants	**L** 3–13	0–2	Arrowhead Stadium	Recap
3	September 30	at Washington Redskins	**W** 45–13	1–2	FedExField	Recap
4	October 7	at **Denver Broncos**	**L** 6–20	1–3	Invesco Field at Mile High	Recap
5	October 14	Pittsburgh Steelers	**L** 17–20	1–4	Arrowhead Stadium	Recap
6	October 21	at Arizona Cardinals	**L** 16–24	1–5	Sun Devil Stadium	Recap
7	October 25	Indianapolis Colts	**L** 28–35	1–6	Arrowhead Stadium	Recap
8	November 4	at **San Diego Chargers**	**W** 25–20	2–6	Qualcomm Stadium	Recap
9	November 11	at New York Jets	**L** 7–27	2–7	Giants Stadium	Recap
10	Bye					
11	November 25	**Seattle Seahawks**	**W** 19–7	3–7	Arrowhead Stadium	Recap
12	November 29	Philadelphia Eagles	**L** 10–23	3–8	Arrowhead Stadium	Recap
13	December 9	at **Oakland Raiders**	**L** 26–28	3–9	Network Associates Coliseum	Recap
14	December 16	**Denver Broncos**	**W** 26–23 (OT)	4–9	Arrowhead Stadium	Recap
15	December 23	**San Diego Chargers**	**W** 20–17	5–9	Arrowhead Stadium	Recap
16	December 30	at Jacksonville Jaguars	**W** 30–26	6–9	Alltel Stadium	Recap
17	January 6	at **Seattle Seahawks**	**L** 18–21	6–10	Husky Stadium	Recap
Note: Intra-division opponents are in **bold** text.

=== Game summaries ===
==== Week 1: vs. Oakland Raiders ====
Week 1: Oakland Raiders at Kansas City Chiefs – Game summary

Quarter	1	2	3	4	Total
**Raiders**	6	0	8	13	**27**
Chiefs	7	7	3	7	**24**

at Arrowhead Stadium, Kansas City, Missouri

- Date: September 9
- Game time: 12:00 p.m. CDT
- Game weather: Mostly sunny, 64 °F (18 °C)
- Game attendance: 78,844
- Referee: Randall Beesley
- TV announcers (CBS): Kevin Harlan, Dan Dierdorf and Bonnie Bernstein
- Recap, Game Book

Game information

**First quarter**

- KC – Eric Warfield 51-yard interception return (Todd Peterson kick), 13:33. Chiefs 7–0.
- OAK – Sebastian Janikowski 43-yard field goal, 9:29. Chiefs 7–3. **Drive: 5 plays, 21 yards, 2:13.**
- OAK – Sebastian Janikowski 42-yard field goal, 1:26. Chiefs 7–6. **Drive: 13 plays, 56 yards, 6:19.**

**Second quarter**

- KC – Tony Richardson 3-yard run (Todd Peterson kick), 14:14. Chiefs 14–6. **Drive: 4 plays, 63 yards, 2:12.**

**Third quarter**

- KC – Todd Peterson 31-yard field goal, 5:50. Chiefs 17–6. **Drive: 5 plays, 46 yards, 1:32.**
- OAK – Tim Brown 33-yard pass from Rich Gannon (Rich Gannon run), 1:53. Chiefs 17–14. **Drive: 7 plays, 60 yards, 3:57.**

**Fourth quarter**

- OAK – Sebastian Janikowski 36-yard field goal, 9:35. Tied 17–17. **Drive: 11 plays, 50 yards, 5:05.**
- OAK – Jon Ritchie 15-yard pass from Rich Gannon (Sebastian Janikowski kick), 3:19. Raiders 24–17. **Drive: 4 plays, 60 yards, 1:37.**
- KC – Marvin Minnis 30-yard pass from Trent Green (Todd Peterson kick), 1:21. Tied 24–24. **Drive: 10 plays, 80 yards, 1:58.**
- OAK – Sebastian Janikowski 31-yard field goal, 0:15. Raiders 27–24. **Drive: 5 plays, 36 yards, 1:06.**

**Top passers**

- OAK – Rich Gannon – 31/46, 341 yards, 2 TD, INT
- KC – Trent Green – 16/37, 222 yards, TD, INT

**Top rushers**

- OAK – Tyrone Wheatley – 14 rushes, 49 yards
- KC – Priest Holmes – 7 rushes, 21 yards

**Top receivers**

- OAK – Tim Brown – 8 receptions, 133 yards, TD
- KC – Tony Gonzalez – 5 receptions, 81 yards

==== Week 2: vs. New York Giants ====
Week 2: New York Giants at Kansas City Chiefs – Game summary

Quarter	1	2	3	4	Total
**Giants**	3	10	0	0	**13**
Chiefs	0	0	3	0	**3**

at Arrowhead Stadium, Kansas City, Missouri

- Date: September 23
- Game time: 12:00 p.m. CDT
- Game weather: Mostly cloudy, 64 °F (18 °C)
- Game attendance: 77,666
- Referee: Tom White
- TV announcers (Fox): Sam Rosen, Bill Maas and Jim Hayes
- Recap, Game Book

Game information

**First quarter**

- NYG – Morten Andersen 42-yard field goal, 12:20. Giants 3–0. **Drive: 6 plays, 11 yards, 1:35.**

**Second quarter**

- NYG – Ron Dayne 7-yard run (Morten Andersen kick), 14:55. Giants 10–0. **Drive: 9 plays, 80 yards, 4:51.**
- NYG – Morten Andersen 34-yard field goal, 0:00. Giants 13–0. **Drive: 7 plays, 42 yards, 1:04.**

**Third quarter**

- KC – Todd Peterson 33-yard field goal, 6:15. Giants 13–3. **Drive: 9 plays, 67 yards, 4:31.**

**Fourth quarter**

- No scoring plays.

**Top passers**

- NYG – Kerry Collins – 20/34, 208 yards, 3 INT
- KC – Trent Green – 17/34, 184 yards, INT

**Top rushers**

- NYG – Ron Dayne – 16 rushes, 46 yards, TD
- KC – Tony Richardson – 9 rushes, 41 yards

**Top receivers**

- NYG – Joe Jurevicius – 7 receptions, 90 yards
- KC – Chris Thomas – 4 receptions, 62 yards

==== Week 3: at Washington Redskins ====
Week 3: Kansas City Chiefs at Washington Redskins – Game summary

Quarter	1	2	3	4	Total
**Chiefs**	0	28	7	10	**45**
Redskins	3	7	3	0	**13**

at FedEx Field, Landover, Maryland

- Date: September 30
- Game time: 1:00 p.m. EDT/12:00 p.m. CDT
- Game weather: Cloudy, 57 °F (14 °C)
- Game attendance: 76,573
- Referee: Jeff Triplette
- TV announcers (CBS): Kevin Harlan, Craig James and Beasley Reece
- Recap, Game Book

Game information

**First quarter**

- WAS – Brett Conway 30-yard field goal, 5:18. Redskins 3–0. **Drive: 13 plays, 71 yards, 7:00.**

**Second quarter**

- KC – Tony Richardson 4-yard run (Todd Peterson kick), 9:43. Chiefs 7–3. **Drive: 12 plays, 70 yards, 6:50.**
- KC – Priest Holmes 24-yard pass from Trent Green (Todd Peterson kick), 4:03. Chiefs 14–3. **Drive: 5 plays, 64 yards, 2:47.**
- WAS – Rod Gardner 26-yard pass from Tony Banks (Brett Conway kick), 4:03. Chiefs 14–10. **Drive: 2 plays, 57 yards, 0:24.**
- KC – Priest Holmes 7-yard run (Todd Peterson kick), 1:20. Chiefs 21–10. **Drive: 6 plays, 60 yards, 2:19.**
- KC – Priest Holmes 24-yard run (Todd Peterson kick), 0:10. Chiefs 28–10. **Drive: 3 plays, 70 yards, 0:22.**

**Third quarter**

- WAS – Brett Conway 28-yard field goal, 10:10. Chiefs 28–13. **Drive: 11 plays, 56 yards, 4:50.**
- KC – Tony Gonzalez 3-yard pass from Trent Green (Todd Peterson kick), 4:22. Chiefs 35–13. **Drive: 9 plays, 75 yards, 5:48.**

**Fourth quarter**

- KC – Todd Peterson 33-yard field goal, 14:51. Chiefs 38–13. **Drive: 7 plays, 52 yards, 2:48.**
- KC – Chris Thomas 3-yard pass from Trent Green (Todd Peterson kick), 10:21. Chiefs 45–13. **Drive: 6 plays, 63 yards, 2:59.**

**Top passers**

- KC – Trent Green – 21/26, 307 yards, 3 TD
- WAS – Tony Banks – 11/27, 116 yards, TD, INT

**Top rushers**

- KC – Priest Holmes – 23 rushes, 147 yards, 2 TD
- WAS – Stephen Davis – 13 rushes, 80 yards

**Top receivers**

- KC – Tony Gonzalez – 5 receptions, 88 yards, TD
- WAS – Rod Gardner – 5 receptions, 55 yards, TD

==== Week 4: at Denver Broncos ====
Week 4: Kansas City Chiefs at Denver Broncos – Game summary

Quarter	1	2	3	4	Total
Chiefs	0	6	0	0	**6**
**Broncos**	7	3	3	7	**20**

at Invesco Field at Mile High, Denver, Colorado

- Date: October 7
- Game time: 3:05 p.m. CDT/2:05 p.m. MDT
- Game weather: Mostly cloudy, 74 °F (23 °C)
- Game attendance: 75,037
- Referee: Mike Carey
- TV announcers (CBS): Dick Enberg, Dan Dierdorf and Bonnie Bernstein
- Recap, Game Book

Game information

**First quarter**

- DEN – Mike Anderson 62-yard run (Jason Elam kick), 5:49. Broncos 7–0. **Drive: 3 plays, 80 yards, 1:10.**

**Second quarter**

- KC – Todd Peterson 23-yard field goal, 10:54. Broncos 7–3. **Drive: 8 plays, 29 yards, 3:50.**
- DEN – Jason Elam 48-yard field goal, 5:05. Broncos 10–3. **Drive: 11 plays, 38 yards, 5:49.**
- KC – Todd Peterson 35-yard field goal, 1:18. Broncos 10–6. **Drive: 13 plays, 70 yards, 3:47.**

**Third quarter**

- DEN – Jason Elam 24-yard field goal, 3:04. Broncos 13–6. **Drive: 14 plays, 74 yards, 8:17.**

**Fourth quarter**

- DEN – Rod Smith 4-yard pass from Brian Griese (Jason Elam kick), 8:11. Broncos 20–6. **Drive: 1 play, 4 yards, 0:05.**

**Top passers**

- KC – Trent Green – 25/40, 283 yards, 4 INT
- DEN – Brian Griese – 11/20, 121 yards, TD, INT

**Top rushers**

- KC – Priest Holmes – 17 rushes, 42 yards
- DEN – Mike Anderson – 22 rushes, 155 yards, TD

**Top receivers**

- KC – Tony Gonzalez – 8 receptions, 129 yards
- DEN – Rod Smith – 8 receptions, 110 yards, TD

==== Week 5: vs. Pittsburgh Steelers ====
Week 5: Pittsburgh Steelers at Kansas City Chiefs – Game summary

Quarter	1	2	3	4	Total
**Steelers**	0	6	14	0	**20**
Chiefs	0	2	0	15	**17**

at Arrowhead Stadium, Kansas City, Missouri

- Date: October 14
- Game time: 12:00 p.m. CDT
- Game weather: Clear and sunny, 57 °F (14 °C)
- Game attendance: 78,413
- Referee: Ron Blum
- TV announcers (CBS): Gus Johnson and Brent Jones
- Recap, Game Book

Game information

**First quarter**

- No scoring plays.

**Second quarter**

- PIT – Kris Brown 42-yard field goal, 9:49. Steelers 3–0. **Drive: 12 plays, 72 yards, 5:13.**
- PIT – Kris Brown 55-yard field goal, 2:10. Steelers 6–0. **Drive: 9 plays, 46 yards, 4:27.**
- KC – Punt blocked by Mikhael Ricks out of bounds in end zone for a Safety, 0:40. Steelers 6–2.

**Third quarter**

- PIT – Chad Scott 61-yard interception return (Kris Brown kick), 12:45. Steelers 13–2.
- PIT – Hines Ward 5-yard pass from Kordell Stewart (Kris Brown kick), 0:52. Steelers 20–2. **Drive: 7 plays, 68 yards, 3:34.**

**Fourth quarter**

- KC – Priest Holmes 26-yard run (Todd Peterson kick), 13:02. Steelers 20–9. **Drive: 6 plays, 60 yards, 2:50.**
- KC – Priest Holmes 1-yard run (Trent Green–Tony Gonzalez pass), 2:39. Steelers 20–17. **Drive: 11 plays, 73 yards, 4:51.**

**Top passers**

- PIT – Kordell Stewart – 15/25, 141 yards, TD
- KC – Trent Green – 16/33, 127 yards, INT

**Top rushers**

- PIT – Jerome Bettis – 19 rushes, 112 yards
- KC – Priest Holmes – 20 rushes, 150 yards, 2 TD

**Top receivers**

- PIT – Plaxico Burress – 3 receptions, 39 yards
- KC – Tony Gonzalez – 5 receptions, 46 yards

==== Week 6: at Arizona Cardinals ====
Week 6: Kansas City Chiefs at Arizona Cardinals – Game summary

Quarter	1	2	3	4	Total
Chiefs	3	6	0	7	**16**
**Cardinals**	0	3	7	14	**24**

at Sun Devil Stadium, Tempe, Arizona

- Date: October 21
- Game time: 3:05 p.m. CDT/1:05 p.m. MST
- Game weather: Mostly cloudy, 88 °F (31 °C)
- Game attendance: 35,916
- Referee: Tony Corrente
- TV announcers (CBS): Don Criqui and Steve Tasker
- Recap, Game Book

Game information

**First quarter**

- KC – Todd Peterson 49-yard field goal, 0:39. Chiefs 3–0. **Drive: 7 plays, 20 yards, 3:45.**

**Second quarter**

- ARI – Bill Gramática 29-yard field goal, 13:08. Tied 3–3. **Drive: 5 plays, 50 yards, 2:31.**
- KC – Todd Peterson 29-yard field goal, 6:19. Chiefs 6–3. **Drive: 12 plays, 60 yards, 6:49.**
- KC – Todd Peterson 33-yard field goal, 0:00. Chiefs 9–3. **Drive: 8 plays, 65 yards, 1:11.**

**Third quarter**

- ARI – Michael Pittman Sr. 24-yard run (Bill Gramática kick), 9:17. Cardinals 10–9. **Drive: 10 plays, 80 yards, 5:43.**

**Fourth quarter**

- ARI – David Boston 23-yard pass from Jake Plummer (Bill Gramática kick), 14:16. Cardinals 17–9. **Drive: 16 plays, 95 yards, 8:51.**
- ARI – Thomas Jones 13-yard run (Bill Gramática kick), 9:43. Cardinals 24–9. **Drive: 4 plays, 40 yards, 2:08.**
- KC – Derrick Alexander 34-yard pass from Trent Green (Todd Peterson kick), 3:57. Cardinals 24–16. **Drive: 2 plays, 75 yards, 0:42.**

**Top passers**

- KC – Trent Green – 21/44, 352 yards, TD, 2 INT
- ARI – Jake Plummer – 16/25, 228 yards, TD

**Top rushers**

- KC – Priest Holmes – 15 rushes, 85 yards
- ARI – Michael Pittman Sr. – 26 rushes, 95 yards, TD

**Top receivers**

- KC – Derrick Alexander – 4 receptions, 99 yards, TD
- ARI – David Boston – 7 receptions, 131 yards, TD

==== Week 7: vs. Indianapolis Colts ====
Week 7: Indianapolis Colts at Kansas City Chiefs – Game summary

Quarter	1	2	3	4	Total
**Colts**	0	7	10	18	**35**
Chiefs	0	3	11	14	**28**

at Arrowhead Stadium, Kansas City, Missouri

- Date: October 25
- Game time: 7:30 p.m. CDT
- Game weather: Clear, 55 °F (13 °C)
- Game attendance: 74,212
- Referee: Ed Hochuli
- TV announcers (ESPN): Mike Patrick, Joe Theismann, Paul Maguire and Suzy Kolber
- Recap, Game Book

Game information

**First quarter**

- No scoring plays.

**Second quarter**

- IND – Marcus Pollard 6-yard pass from Peyton Manning (Mike Vanderjagt kick), 2:22. Colts 7–0. **Drive: 11 plays, 63 yards, 2:52.**
- KC – Todd Peterson 48-yard field goal, 0:00. Colts 7–3. **Drive: 5 plays, 29 yards, 0:45.**

**Third quarter**

- IND – Mike Vanderjagt 50-yard field goal, 9:02. Colts 10–3. **Drive: 12 plays, 44 yards, 5:58.**
- KC – Todd Peterson 22-yard field goal, 5:05. Colts 10–6. **Drive: 8 plays, 75 yards, 3:57.**
- IND – Dominic Rhodes 88-yard kickoff return (Mike Vanderjagt kick), 4:50. Colts 17–6.
- KC – Tony Gonzalez 26-yard pass from Trent Green (Trent Green run), 3:01. Colts 17–14. **Drive: 4 plays, 59 yards, 1:49.**

**Fourth quarter**

- IND – Mike Vanderjagt 42-yard field goal, 13:00. Colts 20–14. **Drive: 9 plays, 52 yards, 5:01.**
- IND – Marvin Harrison 47-yard pass from Peyton Manning (Peyton Mannning–Edgerrin James pass), 8:21. Colts 28–14. **Drive: 4 plays, 64 yards, 2:08.**
- KC – Larry Parker 11-yard pass from Trent Green (Todd Peterson kick), 4:45. Colts 28–21. **Drive: 9 plays, 83 yards, 3:36.**
- IND – Dominic Rhodes 77-yard run (Mike Vanderjagt kick), 1:02. Colts 35–21. **Drive: 3 plays, 80 yards, 0:59.**
- KC – Larry Parker 5-yard pass from Trent Green (Todd Peterson kick), 0:04. Colts 35–28. **Drive: 6 plays, 56 yards, 0:58.**

**Top passers**

- IND – Peyton Manning – 19/30, 201 yards, 2 TD
- KC – Trent Green – 22/43, 324 yards, 3 TD, 3 INT

**Top rushers**

- IND – Edgerrin James – 27 rushes, 102 yards
- KC – Priest Holmes – 15 rushes, 55 yards

**Top receivers**

- IND – Marvin Harrison – 8 receptions, 98 yards, TD
- KC – Larry Parker – 6 receptions, 76 yards, 2 TD

==== Week 8: at San Diego Chargers ====
Week 8: Kansas City Chiefs at San Diego Chargers – Game summary

Quarter	1	2	3	4	Total
**Chiefs**	9	10	0	6	**25**
Chargers	0	0	10	10	**20**

at Qualcomm Stadium, San Diego, California

- Date: November 4
- Game time: 3:15 p.m. CST/1:15 p.m. PST
- Game weather: Clear, 67 °F (19 °C)
- Game attendance: 58,789
- Referee: Ron Winter
- TV announcers (CBS): Kevin Harlan, Craig James and Beasley Reece
- Recap, Game Book

Game information

**First quarter**

- KC – Todd Peterson 37-yard field goal, 5:08. Chiefs 3–0. **Drive: 8 plays, 13 yards, 3:34.**
- KC – Tony Richardson 1-yard run (kick blocked), 1:43. Chiefs 9–0. **Drive: 5 plays, 52 yards, 2:18.**

**Second quarter**

- KC – Priest Holmes 3-yard run (Todd Peterson kick), 3:23. Chiefs 16–0. **Drive: 5 plays, 66 yards, 2:38.**
- KC – Todd Peterson 28-yard field goal, 0:00. Chiefs 19–0. **Drive: 9 plays, 56 yards, 1:15.**

**Third quarter**

- SD – Wade Richey 48-yard field goal, 9:17. Chiefs 19–3. **Drive: 8 plays, 12 yards, 2:10.**
- KC – LaDainian Tomlinson 8-yard run (Wade Richey kick), 0:25. Chiefs 19–10. **Drive: 6 plays, 89 yards, 2:52.**

**Fourth quarter**

- SD – Wade Richey 35-yard field goal, 12:35. Chiefs 19–13. **Drive: 5 plays, 38 yards, 1:26.**
- SD – Freddie Jones 20-yard pass from Drew Brees (Wade Richey kick), 6:10. Chargers 20–19. **Drive: 9 plays, 89 yards, 3:32.**
- KC – Tony Richardson 1-yard run (pass failed), 1:26. Chiefs 25–20. **Drive: 10 plays, 71 yards, 4:44.**

**Top passers**

- KC – Trent Green – 13/25, 146 yards, INT
- SD – Drew Brees – 15/27, 221 yards, TD

**Top rushers**

- KC – Priest Holmes – 30 rushes, 181 yards, TD
- SD – LaDainian Tomlinson – 13 rushes, 31 yards, TD

**Top receivers**

- KC – Marvin Minnis – 2 receptions, 44 yards
- SD – Jeff Graham – 5 receptions, 94 yards

==== Week 9: at New York Jets ====
Week 9: Kansas City Chiefs at New York Jets – Game summary

Quarter	1	2	3	4	Total
Chiefs	0	0	0	7	**7**
**Jets**	0	14	13	0	**27**

at Giants Stadium, East Rutherford, New Jersey

- Date: November 11
- Game time: 1:00 p.m. EST/12:00 p.m. CST
- Game weather: Sunny, 48 °F (9 °C)
- Game attendance: 78,234
- Referee: Tom White
- TV announcers (CBS): Kevin Harlan, Craig James and Beasley Reece
- Recap, Game Book

Game information

**First quarter**

- No scoring plays.

**Second quarter**

- NYJ – Curtis Martin 1-yard run (John Hall kick), 8:40. Jets 7–0. **Drive: 13 plays, 96 yards, 7:32.**
- NYJ – Curtis Martin 25-yard run (John Hall kick), 0:24. Jets 14–0. **Drive: 5 plays, 48 yards, 1:08.**

**Third quarter**

- NYJ – John Hall 51-yard field goal, 12:09. Jets 17–0. **Drive: 7 plays, 30 yards, 2:51.**
- NYJ – Curtis Martin 5-yard run (John Hall kick), 6:40. Jets 24–0. **Drive: 6 plays, 65 yards, 3:27.**
- NYJ – John Hall 31-yard field goal, 2:06. Jets 27–0. **Drive: 4 plays, 7 yards, 2:13.**

**Fourth quarter**

- KC – Tony Gonzalez 26-yard pass from Trent Green (Todd Peterson kick), 9:14. Jets 27–7. **Drive: 8 plays, 38 yards, 4:12.**

**Top passers**

- KC – Trent Green – 16/31, 143 yards, TD, 3 INT
- NYJ – Vinny Testaverde – 15/27, 221 yards, INT

**Top rushers**

- KC – Priest Holmes – 18 rushes, 71 yards
- NYJ – Curtis Martin – 20 rushes, 113 yards, 3 TD

**Top receivers**

- KC – Chris Thomas – 3 receptions, 48 yards
- NYJ – Wayne Chrebet – 6 receptions, 67 yards

==== Week 11: vs. Seattle Seahawks ====
Week 11: Seattle Seahawks at Kansas City Chiefs – Game summary

Quarter	1	2	3	4	Total
Seahawks	0	7	0	0	**7**
**Chiefs**	3	7	0	9	**19**

at Arrowhead Stadium, Kansas City, Missouri

- Date: November 25
- Game time: 12:00 p.m. CST
- Game weather: Fair, 49 °F (9 °C)
- Game attendance: 77,357
- Referee: Mike Carey
- TV announcers (CBS): Ian Eagle and Solomon Wilcots
- Recap, Game Book

Game information

**First quarter**

- KC – Todd Peterson 23-yard field goal, 11:42. Chiefs 3–0. **Drive: 7 plays, 58 yards, 3:18.**

**Second quarter**

- KC – Tony Richardson 1-yard run (Todd Peterson kick), 13:23. Chiefs 10–0. **Drive: 10 plays, 81 yards, 5:56.**
- SEA – Shaun Alexander 28-yard pass from Matt Hasselbeck (Rian Lindell kick), 4:33. Chiefs 10–7. **Drive: 7 plays, 78 yards, 2:51.**

**Third quarter**

- No scoring plays.

**Fourth quarter**

- KC – Todd Peterson 26-yard field goal, 11:47. Chiefs 13–7. **Drive: 17 plays, 79 yards, 7:32.**
- KC – Mike Cloud 15-yard run (run failed), 5:45. Chiefs 19–7. **Drive: 7 plays, 87 yards, 3:59.**

**Top passers**

- SEA – Matt Hasselbeck – 16/26, 162 yards, TD
- KC – Trent Green – 16/26, 256 yards

**Top rushers**

- SEA – Shaun Alexander – 13 rushes, 43 yards
- KC – Priest Holmes – 26 rushes, 120 yards

**Top receivers**

- SEA – Shaun Alexander – 6 receptions, 62 yards, TD
- KC – Tony Gonzalez – 6 receptions, 71 yards

==== Week 12: vs. Philadelphia Eagles ====
Week 12: Philadelphia Eagles at Kansas City Chiefs – Game summary

Quarter	1	2	3	4	Total
**Eagles**	3	10	7	3	**23**
Chiefs	0	3	7	0	**10**

at Arrowhead Stadium, Kansas City, Missouri

- Date: November 29
- Game time: 7:30 p.m. CST
- Game weather: Overcast, 35 °F (2 °C)
- Game attendance: 77,087
- Referee: Bill Carollo
- TV announcers (ESPN): Mike Patrick, Joe Theismann, Paul Maguire and Suzy Kolber
- Recap, Game Book

Game information

**First quarter**

- PHI – David Akers 24-yard field goal, 8:59. Eagles 3–0. **Drive: 12 plays, 54 yards, 6:01.**

**Second quarter**

- PHI – Duce Staley 46-yard pass from Donovan McNabb (David Akers kick), 11:34. Eagles 10–0. **Drive: 2 plays, 41 yards, 0:19.**
- PHI – David Akers 33-yard field goal, 5:17. Eagles 13–0. **Drive: 9 plays, 58 yards, 4:19.**
- KC – Todd Peterson 29-yard field goal, 0:16. Eagles 13–3. **Drive: 14 plays, 64 yards, 5:01.**

**Third quarter**

- PHI – Tony Stewart 1-yard pass from Donovan McNabb (David Akers kick), 8:09. Eagles 20–3. **Drive: 6 plays, 71 yards, 2:52.**
- KC – Derrick Alexander 3-yard pass from Trent Green (Todd Peterson kick), 3:02. Eagles 20–10. **Drive: 8 plays, 38 yards, 5:07.**

**Fourth quarter**

- PHI – David Akers 38-yard field goal, 12:20. Eagles 23–10. **Drive: 11 plays, 60 yards, 5:42.**

**Top passers**

- PHI – Donovan McNabb – 18/26, 269 yards, 2 TD, INT
- KC – Trent Green – 21/35, 213 yards, TD, INT

**Top rushers**

- PHI – Duce Staley – 25 rushes, 80 yards
- KC – Priest Holmes – 18 rushes, 76 yards

**Top receivers**

- PHI – Duce Staley – 4 receptions, 66 yards, TD
- KC – Priest Holmes – 8 receptions, 100 yards

==== Week 13: at Oakland Raiders ====
Week 13: Kansas City Chiefs at Oakland Raiders – Game summary

Quarter	1	2	3	4	Total
Chiefs	10	7	3	6	**26**
**Raiders**	7	14	7	0	**28**

at Network Associates Coliseum, Oakland, California

- Date: December 9
- Game time: 3:15 p.m. CST/1:15 p.m. PST
- Game weather: Patchy, 54 °F (12 °C)
- Game attendance: 60,784
- Referee: Ron Blum
- TV announcers (CBS): Kevin Harlan, Craig James and Beasley Reece
- Recap, Game Book

Game information

**First quarter**

- KC – Priest Holmes 10-yard run (Todd Peterson kick), 7:29. Chiefs 7–0. **Drive: 8 plays, 89 yards, 4:32.**
- KC – Todd Peterson 43-yard field goal, 5:20. Chiefs 10–0. **Drive: 4 plays, 4 yards, 1:58.**
- OAK – Tyrone Wheatley 6-yard run (Sebastian Janikowski kick), 1:54. Chiefs 10–7. **Drive: 6 plays, 77 yards, 3:26.**

**Second quarter**

- KC – Priest Holmes 67-yard pass from Trent Green (Todd Peterson kick), 14:49. Chiefs 17–7. **Drive: 5 plays, 88 yards, 2:05.**
- OAK – Rich Gannon 5-yard run (Sebastian Janikowski kick), 12:34. Chiefs 17–14. **Drive: 4 plays, 36 yards, 2:15.**
- OAK – Jerry Rice 8-yard pass from Rich Gannon (Sebastian Janikowski kick), 0:36. Raiders 21–17. **Drive: 6 plays, 52 yards, 1:45.**

**Third quarter**

- OAK – Tim Brown 88-yard punt return (Sebastian Janikowski kick), 11:34. Raiders 28–17.
- KC – Todd Peterson 36-yard field goal, 9:47. Raiders 28–20. **Drive: 4 plays, 7 yards, 1:47.**

**Fourth quarter**

- KC – Tony Gonzalez 24-yard pass from Trent Green (pass failed), 1:38. Raiders 28–26. **Drive: 2 plays, 27 yards, 0:11.**

**Top passers**

- KC – Trent Green – 15/32, 253 yards, 2 TD, INT
- OAK – Rich Gannon – 18/24, 195 yards, TD, INT

**Top rushers**

- KC – Priest Holmes – 28 rushes, 168 yards, TD
- OAK – Charlie Garner – 10 rushes, 36 yards

**Top receivers**

- KC – Priest Holmes – 5 receptions, 109 yards, TD
- OAK – Jerry Rice – 5 receptions, 57 yards, TD

==== Week 14: vs. Denver Broncos ====
Week 14: Denver Broncos at Kansas City Chiefs – Game summary

Quarter	1	2	3	4	OT	Total
Broncos	0	10	7	6	0	**23**
**Chiefs**	10	3	7	3	3	**26**

at Arrowhead Stadium, Kansas City, Missouri

- Date: December 16
- Game time: 12:00 p.m. CST
- Game weather: Overcast, 49 °F (9 °C)
- Game attendance: 77,778
- Referee: Bernie Kukar
- TV announcers (CBS): Kevin Harlan, Craig James and Beasley Reece
- Recap, Game Book

Game information

**First quarter**

- KC – Todd Peterson 51-yard field goal, 6:04. Chiefs 3–0. **Drive: 11 plays, 49 yards, 6:36.**
- KC – Priest Holmes 12-yard run (Todd Peterson kick), 3:23. Chiefs 10–0. **Drive: 2 plays, 66 yards, 0:59.**

**Second quarter**

- DEN – Rod Smith 11-yard pass from Gus Frerotte (Jason Elam kick), 9:29. Chiefs 10–7. **Drive: 7 plays, 63 yards, 4:09.**
- KC – Todd Peterson 43-yard field goal, 4:29. Chiefs 13–7. **Drive: 10 plays, 47 yards, 5:00.**
- DEN – Jason Elam 34-yard field goal, 0:20. Chiefs 13–10. **Drive: 10 plays, 44 yards, 4:09.**

**Third quarter**

- KC – Derrick Alexander 24-yard pass from Trent Green (Todd Peterson kick), 10:37. Chiefs 20–10. **Drive: 6 plays, 65 yards, 2:43.**
- DEN – Gus Frerotte 4-yard run (Jason Elam kick), 5:08. Chiefs 20–17. **Drive: 11 plays, 84 yards, 5:29.**

**Fourth quarter**

- DEN – Jason Elam 36-yard field goal, 14:20. Tied 20–20. **Drive: 6 plays, 26 yards, 2:25.**
- KC – Todd Peterson 41-yard field goal, 5:12. Chiefs 23–20. **Drive: 4 plays, −1 yard, 1:32.**
- DEN – Jason Elam 49-yard field goal, 1:13. Tied 23–23. **Drive: 9 plays, 40 yards, 3:59.**

**Overtime**

- KC – Todd Peterson 32-yard field goal, 5:56. Chiefs 26–23. **Drive: 2 plays, 56 yards, 0:24.**

**Top passers**

- DEN – Gus Frerotte – 16/22, 181 yards, TD
- KC – Trent Green – 17/21, 292 yards, TD, INT

**Top rushers**

- DEN – Terrell Davis – 21 rushes, 70 yards
- KC – Priest Holmes – 29 rushes, 121 yards, TD

**Top receivers**

- DEN – Rod Smith – 8 receptions, 100 yards, TD
- KC – Marvin Minnis – 5 receptions, 89 yards

==== Week 15: vs. San Diego Chargers ====
Week 15: San Diego Chargers at Kansas City Chiefs – Game summary

Quarter	1	2	3	4	Total
Chargers	7	0	7	3	**17**
**Chiefs**	7	0	3	10	**20**

at Arrowhead Stadium, Kansas City, Missouri

- Date: December 23
- Game time: 12:00 p.m. CST
- Game weather: Overcast, 28 °F (−2 °C)
- Game attendance: 76,131
- Referee: Bob McElwee
- TV announcers (CBS): Don Criqui and Steve Tasker
- Recap, Game Book

Game information

**First quarter**

- KC – Jason Dunn 3-yard pass from Trent Green (Todd Peterson kick), 6:32. Chiefs 7–0. **Drive: 16 plays, 80 yards, 8:28.**
- SD – Freddie Jones 3-yard pass from Doug Flutie (Steve Christie kick), 3:41. Tied 7–7. **Drive: 5 plays, 57 yards, 2:51.**

**Second quarter**

- No scoring plays.

**Third quarter**

- KC – Todd Peterson 33-yard field goal, 10:15. Chiefs 10–7. **Drive: 6 plays, 51 yards, 2:56.**
- SD – Curtis Conway 4-yard pass from Doug Flutie (Steve Christie kick), 1:02. Chargers 14–10. **Drive: 10 plays, 71 yards, 5:22.**

**Fourth quarter**

- KC – Todd Peterson 41-yard field goal, 13:25. Chargers 14–13. **Drive: 6 plays, 37 yards, 2:37.**
- SD – Steve Christie 27-yard field goal, 5:01. Chargers 17–13. **Drive: 10 plays, 65 yards, 4:41.**
- KC – Tony Richardson 1-yard run (Todd Peterson kick), 0:48. Chiefs 20–17. **Drive: 8 plays, 65 yards, 4:13.**

**Top passers**

- SD – Doug Flutie – 15/27, 175 yards, 2 TD
- KC – Trent Green – 19/28, 203 yards, TD, 2 INT

**Top rushers**

- SD – LaDainian Tomlinson – 27 rushes, 145 yards
- KC – Priest Holmes – 23 rushes, 80 yards

**Top receivers**

- SD – Trevor Gaylor – 5 receptions, 78 yards
- KC – Marvin Minnis – 6 receptions, 80 yards

==== Week 16: at Jacksonville Jaguars ====
Week 16: Kansas City Chiefs at Jacksonville Jaguars – Game summary

Quarter	1	2	3	4	Total
**Chiefs**	7	10	10	3	**30**
Jaguars	7	10	0	9	**26**

at Alltel Stadium, Jacksonville, Florida

- Date: December 30
- Game time: 1:00 p.m. EST/12:00 p.m. CST
- Game weather: Mostly cloudy, 53 °F (12 °C)
- Game attendance: 59,396
- Referee: Bill Leavy
- TV announcers (CBS): Don Criqui and Steve Tasker
- Recap, Game Book

Game information

**First quarter**

- KC – Priest Holmes 6-yard run (Todd Peterson kick), 12:45. Chiefs 7–0. **Drive: 3 plays, 14 yards, 1:27.**
- JAX – Stacey Mack 3-yard run (Mike Hollis kick), 8:18. Tied 7–7. **Drive: 9 plays, 79 yards, 4:27.**

**Second quarter**

- JAX – Mark Brunell 3-yard run (Mike Hollis kick), 10:36. Jaguars 14–7. **Drive: 7 plays, 69 yards, 3:10.**
- KC – Tony Gonzalez 24-yard pass from Trent Green (Todd Peterson kick), 5:38. Tied 14–14. **Drive: 9 plays, 57 yards, 4:58.**
- JAX – Mike Hollis 28-yard field goal, 2:56. Jaguars 17–14. **Drive: 6 plays, 63 yards, 2:42.**
- KC – Todd Peterson 47-yard field goal, 0:00. Tied 17–17. **Drive: 5 plays, 39 yards, 0:34.**

**Third quarter**

- KC – Todd Peterson 40-yard field goal, 6:31. Chiefs 20–17. **Drive: 11 plays, 59 yards, 5:26.**
- KC – Tony Gonzalez 12-yard pass from Trent Green (Todd Peterson kick), 3:30. Chiefs 27–17. **Drive: 4 plays, 73 yards, 1:58.**

**Fourth quarter**

- JAX – Keenan McCardell 20-yard pass from Mark Brunell (Mike Hollis kick), 13:25. Chiefs 27–24. **Drive: 8 plays, 77 yards, 3:17.**
- KC – Todd Peterson 29-yard field goal, 5:11. Chiefs 30–24. **Drive: 11 plays, 46 yards, 5:59.**
- JAX – Dan Stryzinski OB in end zone for a Safety, 0:46. Chiefs 30–26.

**Top passers**

- KC – Trent Green – 26/35, 294 yards, 2 TD, 2 INT
- JAX – Mark Brunell – 22/37, 283 yards, TD, INT

**Top rushers**

- KC – Priest Holmes – 27 rushes, 91 yards, TD
- JAX – Stacey Mack – 16 rushes, 125 yards, TD

**Top receivers**

- KC – Eddie Kennison – 6 receptions, 121 yards
- JAX – Keenan McCardell – 7 receptions, 132 yards, TD

==== Week 17: at Seattle Seahawks ====
Week 17: Kansas City Chiefs at Seattle Seahawks – Game summary

Quarter	1	2	3	4	Total
Chiefs	0	0	10	8	**18**
**Seahawks**	0	14	7	0	**21**

at Husky Stadium, Seattle, Washington

- Date: January 6
- Game time: 3:15 p.m. CST/1:15 p.m. PST
- Game weather: Rain, 49 °F (9 °C)
- Game attendance: 58,460
- Referee: Ed Hochuli
- TV announcers (CBS): Bill Macatee and Trevor Matich
- Recap, Game Book

Game information

**First quarter**

- No scoring plays

**Second quarter**

- SEA – Darrell Jackson 12-yard pass from Trent Dilfer (Rian Lindell kick), 4:41. Seahawks 7–0. **Drive: 7 plays, 71 yards, 3:00.**
- SEA – Darrell Jackson 18-yard pass from Trent Dilfer (Rian Lindell kick), 0:21. Seahawks 14–0. **Drive: 10 plays, 72 yards, 2:08.**

**Third quarter**

- KC – Mikhael Ricks 1-yard pass from Trent Green (Todd Peterson kick), 12:11. Seahawks 14–7. **Drive: 2 plays, 1 yard, 0:44.**
- KC – Todd Peterson 27-yard field goal, 5:47. Seahawks 14–10. **Drive: 7 plays, 63 yards, 2:37.**
- SEA – Shaun Alexander 44-yard run (Rian Lindell kick), 0:39. Seahawks 21–10. **Drive: 5 plays, 76 yards, 2:27.**

**Fourth quarter**

- KC – Tony Richardson 1-yard run (Trent Green–Eddie Kennison pass), 0:51. Seahawks 21–18. **Drive: 12 plays, 62 yards, 2:05.**

**Top passers**

- KC – Trent Green – 15/33, 184 yards, TD, INT
- SEA – Trent Dilfer – 22/38, 248 yards, 2 TD, 2 INT

**Top rushers**

- KC – Priest Holmes – 23 rushes, 117 yards
- SEA – Shaun Alexander – 20 rushes, 127 yards, TD

**Top receivers**

- KC – Eddie Kennison – 3 receptions, 74 yards
- SEA – Darrell Jackson – 6 receptions, 71 yards, 2 TD

=== Standings ===
AFC West
	W	L	T	PCT	PF	PA	STK
^{(3)} Oakland Raiders	10	6	0	.625	399	327	L3
Seattle Seahawks	9	7	0	.563	301	324	W2
Denver Broncos	8	8	0	.500	340	339	L1
Kansas City Chiefs	6	10	0	.375	320	344	L1
San Diego Chargers	5	11	0	.313	332	321	L9
