= 2001 Seattle Seahawks season =

American football team season

- Owner: Paul Allen
- General manager: Mike Holmgren
- Head coach: Mike Holmgren
- Offensive coordinator: Gil Haskell
- Defensive coordinator: Steve Sidwell
- Home stadium: Husky Stadium

Results
- Record: 9–7
- Division place: 2nd AFC West
- Playoffs: Did not qualify
- All-Pros: OT Walter Jones (1st team)
- Pro Bowlers: OT Walter Jones; DT John Randle

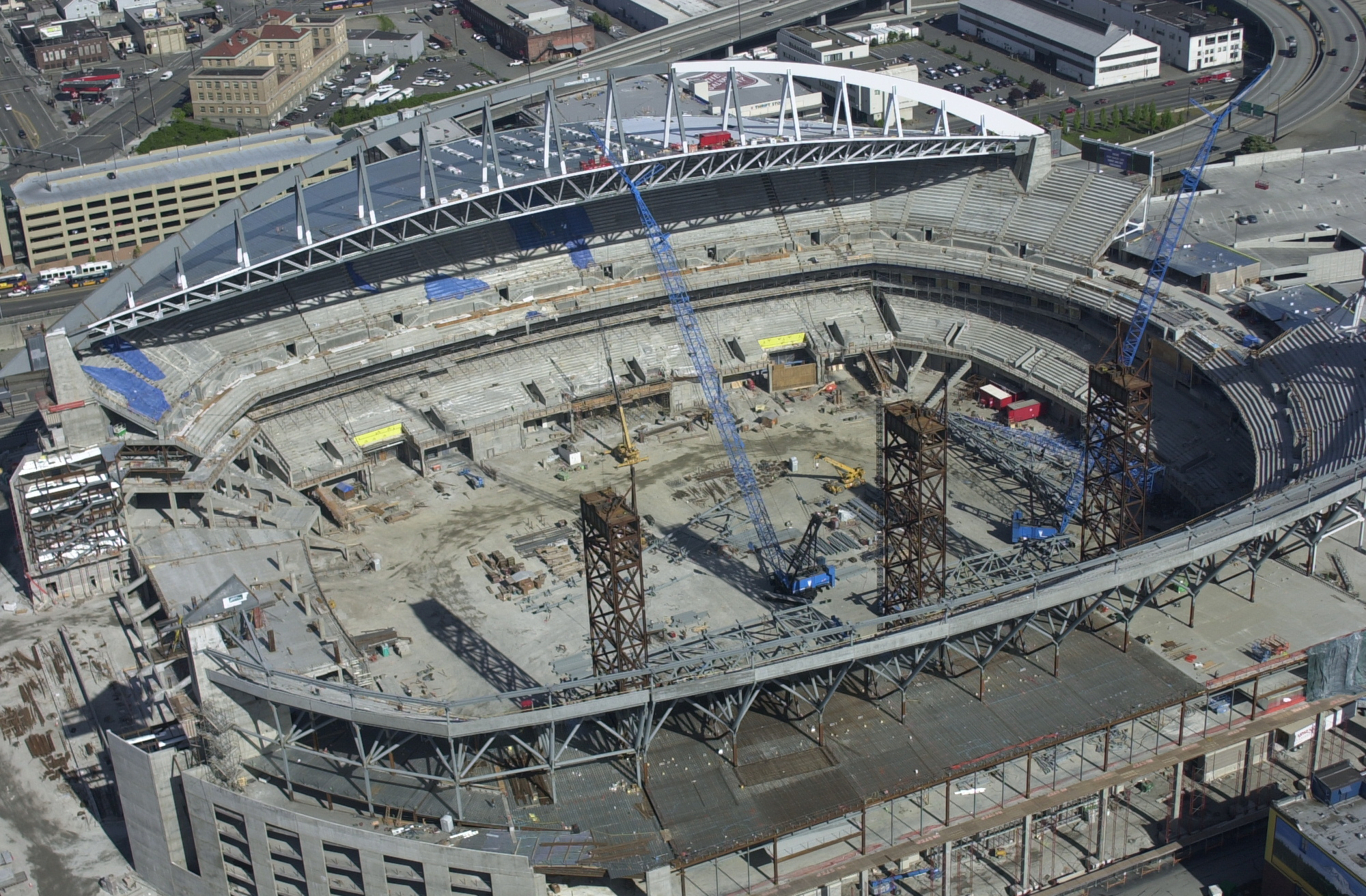
Seahawks Stadium under construction, 2001

The 2001 Seattle Seahawks season was the franchise's 26th season in the National Football League (NFL), The second of two seasons the Seahawks played at Husky Stadium while Seahawks Stadium was being built and the third under head coach Mike Holmgren. They improved on their 6–10 record from 2000 and finished the season at 9–7. The Seahawks were in the playoff hunt until the last game of the season; the Baltimore Ravens' win over the Minnesota Vikings on the last Monday Night game of the year ended Seattle's post-season bid. The 2001 season was the last season for the Seahawks in the American Football Conference (AFC).

Before the season, the Seahawks signed free agent quarterback Trent Dilfer, and traded for quarterback Matt Hasselbeck. Hasselbeck eventually won the starting position over Dilfer. The Seahawks also signed future Hall of Fame defensive tackle John Randle, who spent the last 11 seasons with the Minnesota Vikings and would make the Pro Bowl in his first season with the Seahawks.

The season saw the emergence of the second year running back Shaun Alexander after Ricky Watters was injured for most of the season. Watters retired after the season ended.

It was also the last season the Seahawks wore their traditional blue and green uniforms, and their last year in the AFC West as they returned to the NFC West in the 2002 NFL season.

== Offseason ==
Additions	Subtractions
QB Matt Hasselbeck (Packers)	QB Jon Kitna (Bengals)
DT John Randle (Vikings)	G Pete Kendall (Cardinals)
WR Bobby Engram (Bears)	DT Cortez Kennedy (retirement)
LB Levon Kirkland (Steelers)	S Jay Bellamy (Saints)
QB Trent Dilfer (Ravens)	WR Derrick Mayes (Chiefs)
DT Chad Eaton (Patriots)	
S Marcus Robertson (Titans)	

=== NFL draft ===
2001 Seattle Seahawks draft
Round	Pick	Player	Position	College	Notes
1	9	Koren Robinson *	Wide receiver	North Carolina State	
1	17	Steve Hutchinson * ^{†}	Offensive Guard	Michigan	
2	40	Ken Lucas	Cornerback	Mississippi	
3	82	Heath Evans	Fullback	Auburn	
4	104	Orlando Huff	Linebacker	Fresno State	
4	127	Curtis Fuller	Free Safety	TCU	
4	128	Floyd Womack	Offensive Guard	Mississippi State	
5	140	Alex Bannister *	Wide receiver	Eastern Kentucky	
6	172	Josh Booty	Quarterback	LSU	
7	210	Harold Blackmon	Safety	Northwestern	
7	222	Dennis Norman	Offensive tackle	Princeton	
7	237	Kris Kocurek	Defensive tackle	Texas Tech	
Made roster † Pro Football Hall of Fame * Made at least one Pro Bowl during career

=== Undrafted free agents ===
2001 undrafted free agents of note
Player	Position	College
Joe Brown	Defensive Tackle	Ohio State
Kerwin Cook	Wide receiver	Tulane
Kurtis Doerr	Punter	Oregon
Jerry Dorsey	Wide receiver	Indiana
Lloyd Garden	Fullback	Cincinnati
LaDairis Jackson	Defensive end	Oregon State
Corey Nelson	Wide receiver	Boise State
Doug Sims	Defensive tackle	Hawaii
Russell Stewart	Tight end	Stanford

== Personnel ==
2001 Seattle Seahawks staff
Front office: Chairman – Paul Allen; President – Bob Whitsitt; Senior vice president – Mike Reinfeldt; Vice president of football operations – Ted Thompson; Director of player personnel – John Schneider; Director of pro personnel – Will Lewis; Director of college scouting – Scot McCloughan; Director of football administration – Gary Reynolds; Administrative assistant/coaching – Tom Headlee; Administrative assistant/football operations/travel – Bill Nayes; Pro personnel assistant – John Jamison; Head coaches: Executive vice president of football operations/general manager/head coach – Mike Holmgren; Assistant head coach/offensive line – Tom Lovat; Offensive coaches: Offensive coordinator – Gil Haskell; Quarterbacks – Jim Zorn; Running backs – Stump Mitchell; Wide receivers – Nolan Cromwell; Tight ends – Jim Lind; Offensive quality control – Jerry Colquitt	Defensive coaches: Defensive coordinator – Steve Sidwell; Defensive line – Larry Brooks; Linebackers – Johnny Holland; Defensive backs – Ken Flajole; Defensive quality control – Clayton Lopez; Special teams coaches: Special teams coordinator – Pete Rodriguez; Assistant special teams – Mark Michaels; Strength and conditioning: Strength and conditioning – Kent Johnston; Assistant strength and conditioning – Rod Springer

== Roster ==
2001 Seattle Seahawks roster
**Quarterbacks (QB)**: 4 Trent Dilfer; **8** Matt Hasselbeck; 11 Brock Huard; **Running backs (RB)**: **37** Shaun Alexander; 44 Heath Evans FB; 35 Jay Graham; 20 Charlie Rogers; **38** Mack Strong FB; **Wide receivers (WR)**: 85 Alex Bannister; 83 Fabien Bownes; 14 Kerwin Cook; 84 Bobby Engram PR; **82** Darrell Jackson; **81** Koren Robinson; 88 James Williams KR; **Tight ends (TE)**: **86** Christian Fauria; 89 Itula Mili; 87 Russell Stewart	**Offensive linemen (OL)**: **62** Chris Gray G; **76** Steve Hutchinson G; **71** Walter Jones T; 68 Dennis Norman C; **61** Robbie Tobeck C; 69 Floyd Wedderburn G; **74** Todd Weiner T; 77 Floyd Womack T; **Defensive linemen (DL)**: 60 Joe Brown DT; 78 Antonio Cochran DE/DT; 90 Chad Eaton DT; 95 John Hilliard DE; 93 John Randle DT; 70 Michael Sinclair DE; 98 Cedric Woodard DT	**Linebackers (LB)**: 55 Marcus Bell OLB; **94** Chad Brown OLB; 57 Orlando Huff MLB; 58 Isaiah Kacyvenski OLB; **99** Levon Kirkland MLB; **51** Anthony Simmons OLB; 59 Tim Terry OLB; **Defensive backs (DB)**: 28 Harold Blackmon CB/S; 23 Ike Charlton CB; 29 Curtis Fuller FS; 36 Kerry Joseph SS; **21** Ken Lucas CB; 22 Paul Miranda CB; **31** Marcus Robertson FS; 24 Shawn Springs CB; **25** Reggie Tongue SS; **27** Willie Williams CB; **Special teams (ST)**: 52 J.P. Darche LS; 10 Jeff Feagles P; 9 Rian Lindell K	**Practice squad**: 34 Shawn Forte S; 65 Tupe Peko G; 39 Rodnick Phillips RB; 67 Nigel Tharpe DT; **Reserve**: 33 Maurice Kelly S (IR); 92 Lamar King DE (IR); 91 Matt LaBounty DE (IR); 75 Chris McIntosh T (IR); 32 Ricky Watters RB (IR); Rookies in italics 53 active, 5 reserve, 4 practice squad

- Starters in bold.
- (*) Denotes players that were selected for the 2002 Pro Bowl.

== Schedule ==
=== Preseason ===
Week	Date	Opponent	Result	Record	Game site	Recap
1	August 11	at Indianapolis Colts	**L** 21–28	0–1	RCA Dome	Recap
2	August 18	Arizona Cardinals	**L** 13–16 (OT)	0–2	Husky Stadium	Recap
3	August 25	at San Francisco 49ers	**W** 28–18	1–2	3Com Park	Recap
4	September 1	New Orleans Saints	**W** 28–14	2–2	Husky Stadium	Recap

Source: Seahawks Media Guides

=== Regular season ===
Divisional matchups have the AFC West playing the NFC East.

Week	Date	Opponent	Result	Record	Game site	Recap
1	September 9	at Cleveland Browns	**W** 9–6	1–0	Cleveland Browns Stadium	Recap
2 (Note: The Seahawks were originally scheduled to host the Kansas City Chiefs during Week 2 of the original NFL schedule (September 16) at Husky Stadium. However, due to the September 11 attacks, the game was rescheduled to Week 17.)	September 23	Philadelphia Eagles	**L** 3–27	1–1	Husky Stadium	Recap
3	September 30	at **Oakland Raiders**	**L** 14–38	1–2	Network Associates Coliseum	Recap
4	October 7	Jacksonville Jaguars	**W** 24–15	2–2	Husky Stadium	Recap
5	October 14	**Denver Broncos**	**W** 34–21	3–2	Husky Stadium	Recap
6	Bye					
7	October 28	Miami Dolphins	**L** 20–24	3–3	Husky Stadium	Recap
8	November 4	at Washington Redskins	**L** 14–27	3–4	FedExField	Recap
9	November 11	**Oakland Raiders**	**W** 34–27	4–4	Husky Stadium	Recap
10	November 18	at Buffalo Bills	**W** 23–20	5–4	Ralph Wilson Stadium	Recap
11	November 25	at **Kansas City Chiefs**	**L** 7–19	5–5	Arrowhead Stadium	Recap
12	December 2	**San Diego Chargers**	**W** 13–10 (OT)	6–5	Husky Stadium	Recap
13	December 9	at **Denver Broncos**	**L** 7–20	6–6	Invesco Field at Mile High	Recap
14	December 16	Dallas Cowboys	**W** 29–3	7–6	Husky Stadium	Recap
15	December 23	at New York Giants	**L** 24–27	7–7	Giants Stadium	Recap
16	December 30	at **San Diego Chargers**	**W** 25–22	8–7	Qualcomm Stadium	Recap
17	January 6	**Kansas City Chiefs**	**W** 21–18	9–7	Husky Stadium	Recap
Note: Intra-division opponents are in **bold** text.

Source: 2001 NFL season results

== Standings ==
AFC West
	W	L	T	PCT	PF	PA	STK
^{(3)} Oakland Raiders	10	6	0	.625	399	327	L3
Seattle Seahawks	9	7	0	.563	301	324	W2
Denver Broncos	8	8	0	.500	340	339	L1
Kansas City Chiefs	6	10	0	.375	320	344	L1
San Diego Chargers	5	11	0	.313	332	321	L9

== Game summaries ==
=== Preseason ===
==== Week P1: at Indianapolis Colts ====
Preseason Week One: Seattle Seahawks at Indianapolis Colts – Game summary

Quarter	1	2	3	4	Total
Seahawks	7	7	7	0	21
Colts	3	8	14	3	28

at RCA Dome, Indianapolis

- Date: August 11
- Game time: 7:00 pm local
- Game weather: indoors
- Game attendance: 45,089
- Referee: Bill Carollo
- TV: KCPQ
- Gamecenter, Gamebook

==== Week P2: vs. Arizona Cardinals ====
Preseason Week Two: Seattle Seahawks vs. Arizona Cardinals – Game summary

Quarter	1	2	3	4	OT	Total
Cardinals	7	0	3	3	3	16
Seahawks	0	13	0	0	0	13

at Husky Stadium, Seattle

- Date: August 18
- Game time: 6:37 pm local
- Game weather: partly cloudy, 70 °F (21 °C), 53% humidity, wind NW 6 miles per hour (9.7 km/h)
- Game attendance: 47,553
- Referee: Mark Baltz
- TV: KCPQ
- Gamecenter, Gamebook

==== Week P3: at San Francisco 49ers ====
Preseason Week Three: Seattle Seahawks at San Francisco 49ers – Game summary

Quarter	1	2	3	4	Total
Seahawks	21	0	0	7	28
49ers	0	7	3	8	18

at 3Com Park, San Francisco

- Date: August 25
- Game time: 6:05 pm local
- Game weather: clear, 62 °F (17 °C), 69% humidity, wind W 20 miles per hour (32 km/h)
- Game attendance: 63,887
- Referee: Bill Leavy
- TV: KCPQ
- Gamecenter, Gamebook

==== Week P4: vs. New Orleans Saints ====
Preseason Week Four: Seattle Seahawks vs. New Orleans Saints – Game summary

Quarter	1	2	3	4	Total
Saints	0	7	0	7	14
Seahawks	14	0	7	7	28

at Husky Stadium, Seattle

- Date: September 1
- Game time: 1:00 pm local
- Game weather: cloudy, 64 °F (18 °C), 75% humidity, wind S 15 miles per hour (24 km/h)
- Game attendance: 68,665
- Referee: James Sprenger
- TV: KCPQ
- Gamecenter, Gamebook

=== Regular season ===
==== Week 1: at Cleveland Browns ====
Week One: Seattle Seahawks at Cleveland Browns – Game summary

Quarter	1	2	3	4	Total
Seahawks	0	3	3	3	9
Browns	0	3	0	3	6

at Cleveland Browns Stadium, Cleveland

- Date: September 9
- Game time: 1:02 pm local
- Game weather: clear/partly cloudy, 81 °F (27 °C), 78% humidity, wind S 17 miles per hour (27 km/h)
- Game attendance: 72,318
- Referee: Bill Etzler
- TV announcers (CBS): Ian Eagle, Solomon Wilcots
- Gamecenter, Gamebook

Game information

First quarter

- No scoring plays

Second quarter

- CLE – Phil Dawson 48-yard field goal, 10:27 (CLE 3–0)
- SEA – Rian Lindell 49-yard field goal, 2:30 (Tied 3–3)

Third quarter

- SEA – Rian Lindell 23-yard field goal, 8:17 (SEA 6–3)

Fourth quarter

- CLE – Phil Dawson 22-yard field goal, 2:14 (Tied 6–6)
- SEA – Rian Lindell 52-yard field goal, 0:03 (SEA 9–6)

Top passers

- SEA – Matt Hasselbeck: 20/34, 178 yds, 2 INT
- CLE – Tim Couch: 17/33, 176 yds, 1 INT

Top rushers

- SEA – Ricky Watters: 16 car, 97 yds,
- CLE – Jamel White: 10 car, 52 yds

Top receivers

- SEA – Koren Robinson: 3 rec, 44 yds
- CLE – Kevin Johnson: 4 rec, 51 yds

Team – pass – rush – total – to

- SEA – 150 – 101 – 251 – 2
- CLE – 149 – 90 – 239 – 1

==== Week 2: vs. Philadelphia Eagles ====
Week Two: Seattle Seahawks vs. Philadelphia Eagles – Game summary

Quarter	1	2	3	4	Total
Eagles	3	14	0	10	27
Seahawks	0	3	0	0	3

at Husky Stadium, Seattle

- Date: September 23
- Game time: 1:17 pm local
- Game weather: clear, 65 °F (18 °C), 75% humidity, wind N 4 miles per hour (6.4 km/h)
- Game attendance: 62,826
- Referee: Dick Hantak
- TV announcers (FOX): Curt Menefee, Brian Baldinger, and Tim Ryan
- Gamecenter, Gamebook

Game information

First quarter

- PHI – David Akers 48-yard field goal, 7:01 (PHI 3–0)

Second quarter

- PHI – James Thrash 64-yard pass from Donovan McNabb (David Akers kick), 14:06 (PHI 10–0)
- SEA – Rian Lindell 41-yard field goal, 6:09 (PHI 10–3)
- PHI – James Thrash 23-yard pass from Donovan McNabb (David Akers kick), 2:13 (PHI 17–3)

Third quarter

- No scoring plays

Fourth quarter

- PHI – David Akers 21-yard field goal, 9:31 (PHI 20–3)
- PHI – Donovan McNabb 3-yard run (David Akers kick), 4:22 (PHI 27–3)

Top passers

- PHI – Donovan McNabb: 24/37, 283 yds, 2 TD
- SEA – Matt Hasselbeck: 9/24, 62 yds

Top rushers

- PHI – Correll Buckhalter: 18 car, 52 yds
- SEA – Ricky Watters: 17 car, 81 yds

Top receivers

- PHI – James Thrash: 10 rec, 165 yds, 2 TD
- SEA – Bobby Engram: 2 rec, 28 yds

Team – pass – rush – total – to

- PHI – 242 – 102 – 344 – 1
- SEA – 21 – 126 – 147 – 1

==== Week 3: at Oakland Raiders ====
Week Three: Seattle Seahawks at Oakland Raiders – Game summary

Quarter	1	2	3	4	Total
Seahawks	0	0	7	7	14
Raiders	7	17	14	0	38

at Network Associates Coliseum, Oakland, California

- Date: September 30
- Game time: 1:15 pm local
- Game weather: clear, 72 °F (22 °C), 76% humidity, wind W 7 miles per hour (11 km/h)
- Game attendance: 54,629
- Referee: Ron Blum
- TV announcers (CBS): Don Criqui, Steve Tasker
- Gamecenter, Gamebook

Game information

First quarter

- OAK – Jerry Rice 33-yard pass from Rich Gannon (Sebastian Janikowski kick), 6:22 (OAK 7–0)

Second quarter

- OAK – Sebastian Janikowski 20-yard field goal, 8:12 (OAK 10–0)
- OAK – Eric Allen 26-yard fumble return (Sebastian Janikowski kick), 7:48 (OAK 17–0)
- OAK – Jerry Rice 14-yard pass from Rich Gannon (Sebastian Janikowski kick), 1:57 (OAK 24–0)

Third quarter

- OAK – Rich Gannon 5-yard run (Sebastian Janikowski kick), 11:29 (OAK 31–0)
- OAK – Tyrone Wheatley 3-yard pass from Rich Gannon (Sebastian Janikowski kick), 7:37 (OAK 38–0)
- SEA – Shaun Alexander 4-yard run (Rian Lindell kick), 4:58 (OAK 38–7)

Fourth quarter

- SEA – Christian Fauria 3-yard pass from Brock Huard (Rian Lindell kick), 6:53 (OAK 38–14)

Top passers

- SEA – Matt Hasselbeck: 14/28, 167 yds, 1 INT
- OAK – Rich Gannon: 19/28, 217 yds, 3 TD

Top rushers

- SEA – Shaun Alexander: 10 car, 18 yds, 1 TD
- OAK – Charlie Garner: 7 car, 36 yds

Top receivers

- SEA – Darrell Jackson: 5 rec, 125 yds
- OAK – Jerry Rice: 5 rec, 91 yds, 2 TD

Team – pass – rush – total – to

- SEA – 306 – 42 – 348 – 3
- OAK – 251 – 93 – 344 – 1

==== Week 4: vs. Jacksonville Jaguars ====
Week Four: Seattle Seahawks vs. Jacksonville Jaguars – Game summary

Quarter	1	2	3	4	Total
Jaguars	3	9	3	0	15
Seahawks	14	7	0	3	24

at Husky Stadium, Seattle

- Date: October 7
- Game time: 1:05 pm local
- Game weather: overcast/sunny, 50 °F (10 °C), 89% humidity, wind SW 6 miles per hour (9.7 km/h)
- Game attendance: 54,524
- Referee: Tony Corrente
- TV announcers (CBS): Ian Eagle, Solomon Wilcots
- Gamecenter, Gamebook

Game information

First quarter

- JAX – Mike Hollis 32-yard field goal, 9:12 (JAX 3–0)
- SEA – Itula Mili 1-yard pass from Trent Dilfer (Rian Lindell kick), 6:11 (SEA 7–3)
- SEA – Shaun Alexander 14-yard run (Rian Lindell kick), 2:03 (SEA 14–3)

Second quarter

- JAX – Mike Hollis 48-yard field goal, 8:41 (SEA 14–6)
- JAX – Elvis Joseph 18-yard pass from Mark Brunell (PAT failed), 8:19 (SEA 14–12)
- SEA – Shaun Alexander 3-yard run (Rian Lindell kick), 5:06 (SEA 21–12)

Third quarter

- JAX – Mike Hollis 48-yard field goal, 9:26 (SEA 21–15)

Fourth quarter

- SEA – Rian Lindell 25-yard field goal, 7:39 (SEA 24–15)

Top passers

- JAX – Mark Brunell: 21/39, 233 yds, 1 TD
- SEA – Trent Dilfer: 15/23, 219 yds, 1 TD, 1 INT

Top rushers

- JAX – Elvis Joseph: 12 car, 39 yds
- SEA – Shaun Alexander: 31 car, 176 yds, 2 TD

Top receivers

- JAX – Keenan McCardell: 7 rec, 97 yds
- SEA – Bobby Engram: 5 rec, 71 yds

Team – pass – rush – total – to

- JAX – 199 – 57 – 256 – 2
- SEA – 210 – 185 – 395 – 2

==== Week 5: vs. Denver Broncos ====
Week Five: Seattle Seahawks vs. Denver Broncos – Game summary

Quarter	1	2	3	4	Total
Broncos	0	14	0	7	21
Seahawks	10	14	7	3	34

at Husky Stadium, Seattle

- Date: October 14
- Game time: 1:16 pm local
- Game weather: cloudy, 54 °F (12 °C), 90% humidity, wind NE 7 miles per hour (11 km/h)
- Game attendance: 61,837
- Referee: Larry Nemmers
- TV announcers (CBS): Kevin Harlan, Craig James, and Beasley Reece
- Gamecenter, Gamebook

Game information

First quarter

- SEA – Shaun Alexander 60-yard run (Rian Lindell kick), 11:54 (SEA 7–0)
- SEA – Rian Lindell 44-yard field goal, 5:41 (SEA 10–0)

Second quarter

- SEA – Reggie Tongue 55-yard interception return (Rian Lindell kick), 14:48 (SEA 17–0)
- DEN – Eddie Kennison 8-yard pass from Brian Griese (Jason Elam kick), 6:18 (SEA 17–7)
- SEA – Shaun Alexander 1-yard run (Rian Lindell kick), 3:14 (SEA 24–7)
- DEN – Rod Smith 1-yard pass from Brian Griese (Jason Elam kick), 0:09 (SEA 24–14)

Third quarter

- SEA – Alex Bannister 9-yard blocked punt return (Rian Lindell kick), 5:34 (SEA 31–14)

Fourth quarter

- SEA – Rian Lindell 23-yard field goal, 11:21 (SEA 34–14)
- DEN – Deltha O'Neal 86-yard punt return (Jason Elam kick), 1:40 (SEA 34–21)

Top passers

- DEN – Brian Griese: 24/36, 209 yds, 2 TD, 3 INT
- SEA – Trent Dilfer: 12/18, 110 yds

Top rushers

- DEN – Mike Anderson: 17 car, 51 yds
- SEA – Shaun Alexander: 33 car, 142 yds, 2 TD

Top receivers

- DEN – Eddie Kennison: 6 rec, 84 yds, 1 TD
- SEA – Darrell Jackson: 4 rec, 38 yds

Team – pass – rush – total – to

- DEN – 189 – 92 – 281 – 3
- SEA – 93 – 161 – 254 – 1

==== Week 7: vs. Miami Dolphins ====
Week Seven: Seattle Seahawks vs. Miami Dolphins – Game summary

Quarter	1	2	3	4	Total
Dolphins	0	10	7	7	24
Seahawks	0	14	3	3	20

at Husky Stadium, Seattle

- Date: October 28
- Game time: 1:15 pm local
- Game weather: clear, 43 °F (6 °C), 82% humidity, wind NE 7 miles per hour (11 km/h)
- Game attendance: 59,108
- Referee: Bob McElwee
- TV announcers (CBS): Ian Eagle, Solomon Wilcots
- Gamecenter, Gamebook

Game information

First quarter

- No scoring plays

Second quarter

- MIA – Olindo Mare 46-yard field goal, 13:34 (MIA 3–0)
- MIA – Travis Minor recovered fumble in end zone (Olindo Mare kick), 5:39 (MIA 10–0)
- SEA – Itula Mili 15-yard pass from Matt Hasselbeck (Rian Lindell kick), 3:18 (MIA 10–7)
- SEA – Darrell Jackson 17-yard pass from Matt Hasselbeck (Rian Lindell kick), 0:42 (SEA 14–10)

Third quarter

- SEA – Rian Lindell 19-yard field goal, 6:45 (SEA 17–10)
- MIA – Lamar Smith 1-yard run (Olindo Mare kick), 0:07 (Tied 17–17)

Fourth quarter

- SEA – Rian Lindell 42-yard field goal, 8:37 (SEA 20–17)
- MIA – James McKnight 39-yard pass from Jay Fiedler (Olindo Mare kick), 6:16 (MIA 24–20)

Top passers

- MIA – Jay Fiedler: 15/21, 213 yds, 1 TD, 2 INT
- SEA – Matt Hasselbeck: 16/28, 230 yds, 2 TD

Top rushers

- MIA – Jay Fiedler: 8 car, 41 yds
- SEA – Shaun Alexander: 23 car, 87 yds

Top receivers

- MIA – James McKnight: 8 rec, 94 yds, 1 TD
- SEA – Darrell Jackson: 5 rec, 121 yds, 1 TD

Team – pass – rush – total – to

- MIA – 213 – 76 – 289 – 4
- SEA – 206 – 96 – 302 – 2

==== Week 8: at Washington Redskins ====
Week Eight: Seattle Seahawks at Washington Redskins – Game summary

Quarter	1	2	3	4	Total
Seahawks	7	0	7	0	14
Redskins	10	10	7	0	27

at FedEx Field, Landover, Maryland

- Date: November 4
- Game time: 4:15 pm local
- Game weather: clear, 65 °F (18 °C), 42% humidity, wind E 6 miles per hour (9.7 km/h)
- Game attendance: 82,352
- Referee: Tom White
- TV announcers (CBS): Gus Johnson, Brent Jones
- Gamecenter, Gamebook

Game information

First quarter

- WAS – Walter Rasby 7-yard pass from Tony Banks (Brett Conway kick), 10:26 (WAS 7–0)
- SEA – Shaun Alexander 41-yard run (Rian Lindell kick), 7:02 (Tied 7–7)
- WAS – Brett Conway 43-yard field goal, 1:52 (WAS 10–7)

Second quarter

- WAS – Brett Conway 23-yard field goal, 14:51 (WAS 13–7)
- WAS – Stephen Davis 1-yard run (Brett Conway kick), 5:29 (WAS 20–7)

Third quarter

- WAS – Michael Westbrook 13-yard pass from Tony Banks (Brett Conway kick), 7:56 (WAS 27–7)
- SEA – Darrell Jackson 46-yard pass from Trent Dilfer (Rian Lindell kick), 2:09 (WAS 27–14)

Fourth quarter

- No scoring plays

Top passers

- SEA – Matt Hasselbeck: 6/12, 127 yds, 2 INT
- WAS – Tony Banks: 15/23, 152 yds, 2 TD, 1 INT

Top rushers

- SEA – Shaun Alexander: 13 car, 60 yds, 1 TD
- WAS – Stephen Davis: 32 car, 142 yds, 1 TD

Top receivers

- SEA – James Williams: 2 rec, 69 yds
- WAS – Bryan Johnson: 1 rec, 29 yds

Team – pass – rush – total – to

- SEA – 215 – 60 – 275 – 4
- WAS – 139 – 226 – 365 – 1

==== Week 9: vs. Oakland Raiders ====
Week Nine: Seattle Seahawks vs. Oakland Raiders – Game summary

Quarter	1	2	3	4	Total
Raiders	3	7	10	7	27
Seahawks	6	7	14	7	34

at Husky Stadium, Seattle

- Date: November 11
- Game time: 5:36 pm local
- Game weather: rain, 50 °F (10 °C), 100% humidity, wind calm
- Game attendance: 67,231
- Referee: Walt Coleman
- TV announcers (ESPN): Mike Patrick, Paul Maguire, Joe Theismann, Suzy Kolber
- Gamecenter, Gamebook

Game information

First quarter

- SEA – Rian Lindell 33-yard field goal, 11:18 (SEA 3–0)
- OAK – Sebastian Janikowski 52-yard field goal, 8:19 (Tied 3–3)
- SEA – Rian Lindell 20-yard field goal, 0:52 (SEA 6–3)

Second quarter

- OAK – Tim Brown 4-yard pass from Rich Gannon (Sebastian Janikowski kick), 4:20 (OAK 10–6)
- SEA – Darrell Jackson 9-yard pass from Matt Hasselbeck (Rian Lindell kick), 0:20 (SEA 13–10)

Third quarter

- OAK – Terry Kirby 90-yard kickoff return (Sebastian Janikowski kick), 14:44 (OAK 17–13)
- OAK – Sebastian Janikowski 37-yard field goal, 8:33 (OAK 20–13)
- SEA – Shaun Alexander 6-yard run (Rian Lindell kick), 4:18 (Tied 20–20)
- SEA – Shaun Alexander 88-yard run (Rian Lindell kick), 1:05 (SEA 27–20)

Fourth quarter

- SEA – Shaun Alexander 10-yard run (Rian Lindell kick), 7:03 (SEA 34–20)
- OAK – Roland Williams 5-yard pass from Rich Gannon (Sebastian Janikowski kick), 3:40 (SEA 34–27)

Top passers

- OAK – Rich Gannon: 24/38, 257 yds, 2 TD
- SEA – Matt Hasselbeck: 19/35, 250 yds, 1 TD

Top rushers

- OAK – Charlie Garner: 13 car, 57 yds
- SEA – Shaun Alexander: 35 car, 226 yds, 3 TD

Top receivers

- OAK – Tim Brown: 7 rec, 86 yds, 1 TD
- SEA – Darrell Jackson: 7 rec, 102 yds, 1 TD

Team – pass – rush – total – to

- OAK – 250 – 88 – 338 – 1
- SEA – 178 – 319 – 497 – 0

==== Week 10: at Buffalo Bills ====
Week Ten: Seattle Seahawks at Buffalo Bills – Game summary

Quarter	1	2	3	4	Total
Seahawks	3	7	7	6	23
Bills	0	10	3	7	20

at Ralph Wilson Stadium, Orchard Park, New York

- Date: November 18
- Game time: 1:02 pm local
- Game weather: clear, 55 °F (13 °C), 56% humidity, wind SW 14 miles per hour (23 km/h)
- Game attendance: 60,836
- Referee: Bernie Kukar
- TV announcers (CBS): Don Criqui, Steve Tasker, Jim Kelly
- Gamecenter, Gamebook

Game information

First quarter

- SEA – Rian Lindell 19-yard field goal, 2:14 (SEA 3–0)

Second quarter

- SEA – Koren Robinson 7-yard pass from Matt Hasselbeck (Rian Lindell kick), 9:10 (SEA 10–0)
- BUF – Peerless Price 16-yard pass from Alex Van Pelt (Jake Arians kick), 7:40 (SEA 10–7)
- BUF – Jake Arians 25-yard field goal, 0:19 (Tied 10–10)

Third quarter

- SEA – Shaun Alexander 1-yard run (Rian Lindell kick), 10:41 (SEA 17–10)
- BUF – Jake Arians 26-yard field goal, 4:52 (SEA 17–13)

Fourth quarter

- SEA – Rian Lindell 38-yard field goal, 5:22 (SEA 20–13)
- SEA – Rian Lindell 51-yard field goal, 3:12 (SEA 23–13)
- BUF – Jay Riemersma 6-yard pass from Alex Van Pelt (Jake Arians kick), 1:23 (SEA 23–20)

Top passers

- SEA – Matt Hasselbeck: 16/23, 134 yds, 1 TD
- BUF – Alex Van Pelt: 28/42, 316 yds, 2 TD

Top rushers

- SEA – Shaun Alexander: 25 car, 93 yds, 1 TD
- BUF – Travis Henry: 13 car, 29 yds

Top receivers

- SEA – Darrell Jackson: 4 rec, 39 yds
- BUF – Peerless Price: 10 rec, 138 yds, 1 TD

Team – pass – rush – total – to

- SEA – 134 – 112 – 246 – 0
- BUF – 303 – 60 – 372 – 2

==== Week 11: at Kansas City Chiefs ====
Week Eleven: Seattle Seahawks at Kansas City Chiefs – Game summary

Quarter	1	2	3	4	Total
Seahawks	0	7	0	0	7
Chiefs	3	7	0	9	19

at Arrowhead Stadium, Kansas City, Missouri

- Date: November 25
- Game time: 12:00 pm local
- Game weather: clear, 49 °F (9 °C), 76% humidity, wind S 5 miles per hour (8.0 km/h)
- Game attendance: 77,357
- Referee: Mike Carey
- TV announcers (CBS): Ian Eagle, Solomon Wilcots
- Gamecenter, Gamebook

Game information

First quarter

- KC – Todd Peterson 23-yard field goal, 11:42 (KC 3–0)

Second quarter

- KC – Tony Richardson 1-yard run (Todd Peterson kick), 13:23 (KC 10–0)
- SEA – Shaun Alexander 28-yard pass from Matt Hasselbeck (Rian Lindell kick), 4:33 (KC 10–7)

Third quarter

- No scoring plays

Fourth quarter

- KC – Todd Peterson 26-yard field goal, 11:47 (KC 13–7)
- KC – Mike Cloud 15-yard run (PAT failed), 5:45 (KC 19–7)

Top passers

- SEA – Matt Hasselbeck: 16/26, 162 yds, 1 TD
- KC – Trent Green: 16/26, 256 yds

Top rushers

- SEA – Shaun Alexander: 13 car, 43 yds
- KC – Priest Holmes: 26 car, 120 yds

Top receivers

- SEA – Shaun Alexander: 6 rec, 62 yds, 1 TD
- KC – Tony Gonzalez: 6 rec, 71 yds

Team – pass – rush – total – to

- SEA – 139 – 65 – 204 – 0
- KC – 245 – 188 – 433 – 0

==== Week 12: vs. San Diego Chargers ====
Week Twelve: Seattle Seahawks vs. San Diego Chargers – Game summary

Quarter	1	2	3	4	OT	Total
Chargers	0	3	7	0	0	10
Seahawks	7	0	3	0	3	13

at Husky Stadium, Seattle

- Date: December 2
- Game time: 1:05 pm local
- Game weather: overcast/rain, 41 °F (5 °C), 82% humidity, wind NE 12 miles per hour (19 km/h)
- Game attendance: 55,466
- Referee: Larry Nemmers
- TV announcers (CBS): Kevin Harlan, Craig James and Beasley Reece
- Gamecenter, Gamebook

Game information

First quarter

- SEA – Shaun Alexander 1-yard run (Rian Lindell kick), 7:29 (SEA 7–0)

Second quarter

- SD – Steve Christie 26-yard field goal, 5:11 (SEA 7–3)

Third quarter

- SD – LaDainian Tomlinson 1-yard run (Steve Christie kick), 6:18 (SD 10–7)
- SEA – Rian Lindell 43-yard field goal, 2:40 (Tied 10–10)

Fourth quarter

- No scoring plays

Overtime

- SEA – Rian Lindell 24-yard field goal, 8:37 (SEA 13–10)

Top passers

- SD – Doug Flutie: 19/33, 195 yds, 2 INT
- SEA – Matt Hasselbeck: 19/35, 202 yds

Top rushers

- SD – LaDainian Tomlinson: 24 car, 87 yds, 1 TD
- SEA – Shaun Alexander: 29 car, 87 yds, 1 TD

Top receivers

- SD – Tim Dwight: 5 rec, 59 yds
- SEA – Darrell Jackson: 6 rec, 76 yds

Team – pass – rush – total – to

- SD – 185 – 107 – 292 – 3
- SEA – 192 – 117 – 309 – 0

==== Week 13 at Denver Broncos ====
Week Thirteen: Seattle Seahawks at Denver Broncos – Game summary

Quarter	1	2	3	4	Total
Seahawks	0	7	0	0	7
Broncos	7	3	10	0	20

at Invesco Field at Mile High, Denver

- Date: December 9
- Game time: 6:35 pm local
- Game weather: cloudy, 38 °F (3 °C), 38% humidity, wind E 3 miles per hour (4.8 km/h)
- Game attendance: 74,524
- Referee: Jeff Triplette
- TV announcers (ESPN): Mike Patrick, Paul Maguire, Joe Theismann, Suzy Kolber
- Gamecenter, Gamebook

Game information

First quarter

- DEN – Desmond Clark 11-yard pass from Brian Griese (Jason Elam kick), 3:10 (DEN 7–0)

Second quarter

- DEN – Jason Elam 42-yard field goal, 13:47 (DEN 10–0)
- SEA – Darrell Jackson 24-yard pass from Matt Hasselbeck (Rian Lindell kick), 1:05 (DEN 10–7)

Third quarter

- DEN – Patrick Hape 11-yard pass from Gus Frerotte (Jason Elam kick), 7:39 (DEN 17–7)
- DEN – Jason Elam 20-yard field goal, 0:43 (DEN 20–7)

Fourth quarter

- No scoring plays

Top passers

- SEA – Matt Hasselbeck: 17/37, 243 yds, 1 TD, 2 INT
- DEN – Brian Griese: 11/17, 81 yds, 1 TD, 1 INT

Top rushers

- SEA – Shaun Alexander: 12 car, 28 yds
- DEN – Terrell Davis: 19 car, 109 yds

Top receivers

- SEA – Darrell Jackson: 4 rec, 104 yds, 1 TD
- DEN – Rod Smith: 8 rec, 66 yds

Team – pass – rush – total – to

- SEA – 207 – 70 – 277 – 2
- DEN – 144 – 165 – 309 – 2

==== Week 14: vs. Dallas Cowboys ====
Week Fourteen: Seattle Seahawks vs. Dallas Cowboys – Game summary

Quarter	1	2	3	4	Total
Cowboys	0	3	0	0	3
Seahawks	10	0	2	17	29

at Husky Stadium, Seattle

- Date: December 16
- Game time: 1:17 pm local
- Game weather: rain, 46 °F (8 °C), 100% humidity, wind SE 20 miles per hour (32 km/h)
- Game attendance: 63,366
- Referee: Tony Corrente
- TV announcers (FOX): Curt Menefee, Ray Bentley, and Tim Ryan
- Gamecenter, Gamebook

Game information

First quarter

- SEA – Ricky Watters 1-yard run (Rian Lindell kick), 10:17 (SEA 7–0)
- SEA – Rian Lindell 22-yard field goal, 2:58 (SEA 10–0)

Second quarter

- DAL – Jon Hilbert 37-yard field goal, 12:42 (SEA 10–3)

Third quarter

- SEA – Safety, Reggie Swinton fumbles punt return out of end zone, 3:48 (SEA 12–3)

Fourth quarter

- SEA – Rian Lindell 37-yard field goal, 13:10 (SEA 15–3)
- SEA – Shaun Alexander 7-yard run (Rian Lindell kick), 6:37 (SEA 22–3)
- SEA – Ike Charlton 38-yard interception return (Rian Lindell kick), 6:19 (SEA 29–3)

Top passers

- DAL – Quincy Carter: 14/33, 135 yds, 1 INT
- SEA – Matt Hasselbeck: 13/25, 152 yds

Top rushers

- DAL – Quincy Carter: 6 car, 40 yds
- SEA – Ricky Watters: 28 car, 104 yds, 1 TD

Top receivers

- DAL – Joey Galloway: 7 rec, 82 yds
- SEA – Darrell Jackson: 4 rec, 85 yds

Team – pass – rush – total – to

- DAL – 116 – 102 – 218 – 1
- SEA – 139 – 173 – 312 – 0

==== Week 15: at New York Giants ====
Week Fifteen: Seattle Seahawks at New York Giants – Game summary

Quarter	1	2	3	4	Total
Seahawks	7	10	7	0	24
Giants	7	10	0	10	27

at Giants Stadium, East Rutherford, New Jersey

- Date: December 23
- Game time: 1:03 pm local
- Game weather: partly cloudy, 43 °F (6 °C), 47% humidity, wind S 7 miles per hour (11 km/h)
- Game attendance: 78,119
- Referee: Ron Winter
- TV announcers (CBS): Kevin Harlan, Craig James, and Beasley Reece
- Gamecenter, Gamebook

Game information

First quarter

- SEA – Shaun Alexander 29-yard run (Rian Lindell kick), 5:43 (SEA 7–0)
- NYG – Ron Dayne 31-yard run (Morten Andersen kick), 2:53 (Tied 7–7)

Second quarter

- SEA – Rian Lindell 20-yard field goal, 11:31 (SEA 10–7)
- NYG – Michael Strahan 13-yard fumble return (Morten Andersen kick), 5:52 (NYG 14–10)
- SEA – John Randle recovered fumble in end zone (Rian Lindell kick), 3:24 (SEA 17–14)
- NYG – Morten Andersen 32-yard field goal, 0:15 (Tied 17–17)

Third quarter

- SEA – Shaun Alexander 16-yard pass from Matt Hasselbeck (Rian Lindell kick), 12:53 (SEA 24–17)

Fourth quarter

- NYG – Morten Andersen 33-yard field goal, 12:41 (SEA 24–20)
- NYG – Ike Hilliard 7-yard pass from Kerry Collins (Morten Andersen kick), 0:20 (NYG 27–24)

Top passers

- SEA – Matt Hasselbeck: 15/26, 185 yds, 1 TD, 1 INT
- NYG – Kerry Collins: 30/47, 338 yds, 1 TD

Top rushers

- SEA – Shaun Alexander: 28 car, 96 yds, 1 TD
- NYG – Tiki Barber: 12 car, 47 yds

Top receivers

- SEA – Koren Robinson: 3 rec, 58 yds
- NYG – Amani Toomer: 8 rec, 124 yds

Team – pass – rush – total – to

- SEA – 161 – 98 – 259 – 2
- NYG – 332 – 88 – 420 – 2

==== Week 16: at San Diego Chargers ====
Week Sixteen: Seattle Seahawks at San Diego Chargers – Game summary

Quarter	1	2	3	4	Total
Seahawks	0	14	8	3	25
Chargers	10	3	3	6	22

at Qualcomm Stadium, San Diego, California

- Date: December 30
- Game time: 1:15 pm local
- Game weather: overcast, 63 °F (17 °C), 53% humidity, wind WSW 8 miles per hour (13 km/h)
- Game attendance: 51,412
- Referee: Tom White
- TV announcers (CBS): Bill Macatee, Trevor Matich, and Scott Kaplan
- Gamecenter, Gamebook

Game information

First quarter

- SD – Curtis Conway 4-yard pass from Doug Flutie (Steve Christie kick), 7:55 (SD 7–0)
- SD – Steve Christie 32-yard field goal, 4:39 (SD 10–0)

Second quarter

- SD – Steve Christie 25-yard field goal, 13:31 (SD 13–0)
- SEA – Darrell Jackson 43-yard pass from Trent Dilfer (Rian Lindell kick), 12:01 (SD 13–7)
- SEA – Darrell Jackson 48-yard pass from Trent Dilfer (Rian Lindell kick), 7:19 (SEA 14–13)

Third quarter

- SD – Steve Christie 40-yard field goal, 9:33 (SD 16–14)
- SEA – James Williams 37-yard pass from Trent Dilfer (2-pt PAT: Christian Fauria pass from Trent Dilfer), 6:21 (SEA 22–16)

Fourth quarter

- SD – Steve Christie 41-yard field goal, 10:11 (SEA 22–19)
- SD – Steve Christie 36-yard field goal, 0:16 (Tied 22–22)
- SEA – Rian Lindell 54-yard field goal, 0:00 (SEA 25–22)

Top passers

- SEA – Trent Dilfer: 14/23, 267 yds, 3 TD
- SD – Doug Flutie: 34/53, 377 yds, 1 TD, 2 INT

Top rushers

- SEA – Shaun Alexander: 23 car, 59 yds
- SD – LaDainian Tomlinson: 14 car, 38 yds

Top receivers

- SEA – Darrell Jackson: 5 rec, 114 yds, 2 TD
- SD – Curtis Conway: 11 rec, 156 yds, 1 TD

Team – pass – rush – total – to

- SEA – 246 – 61 – 307 – 0
- SD – 346 – 52 – 398 – 2

==== Week 17: vs. Kansas City Chiefs ====
Week Seventeen: Seattle Seahawks vs. Kansas City Chiefs – Game summary

Quarter	1	2	3	4	Total
Chiefs	0	0	10	8	18
Seahawks	0	14	7	0	21

at Husky Stadium, Seattle

- Date: January 6
- Game time: 1:16 pm local
- Game weather: rain, 49 °F (9 °C), 69% humidity, wind calm
- Game attendance: 58,460
- Referee: Ed Hochuli
- TV announcers (CBS): Bill Macatee, Trevor Matich
- Gamecenter, Gamebook

Game information

First quarter

- No scoring plays

Second quarter

- SEA – Darrell Jackson 12-yard pass from Trent Dilfer (Rian Lindell kick), 4:41 (SEA 7–0)
- SEA – Darrell Jackson 18-yard pass from Trent Dilfer (Rian Lindell kick), 0:21 (SEA 14–0)

Third quarter

- KC – Mikhael Ricks 1-yard pass from Trent Green (Todd Peterson kick), 12:11 (SEA 14–7)
- KC – Todd Peterson 27-yard field goal, 5:47 (SEA 14–10)
- SEA – Shaun Alexander 44-yard run (Rian Lindell kick), 0:39 (SEA 21–10)

Fourth quarter

- KC – Tony Richardson 1-yard run (2-pt PAT: Eddie Kennison pass from Trent Green), 0:51 (SEA 21–18)

Top passers

- KC – Trent Green: 15/33, 184 yds, 1 TD, 1 INT
- SEA – Trent Dilfer: 22/38, 248 yds, 2 TD, 2 INT

Top rushers

- KC – Priest Holmes: 23 car, 117 yds
- SEA – Shaun Alexander: 20 car, 127 yds, 1 TD

Top receivers

- KC – Eddie Kennison: 3 rec, 74 yds
- SEA – Darrell Jackson: 6 rec, 71 yds, 2 TD

Team – pass – rush – total – to

- KC – 182 – 126 – 308 – 1
- SEA – 239 – 150 – 389 – 2
