= Eric Downing =

American football player (born 1978)

No. 79, 92, 93
- Position: Defensive tackle

Personal information
- Born: September 16, 1978 (age 48); Ahoskie, North Carolina, U.S.
- Listed height: 6 ft 4 in (1.93 m)
- Listed weight: 315 lb (143 kg)

Career information
- High school: Paterson (NJ) John F. Kennedy
- College: Syracuse
- NFL draft: 2001: 3rd round, 75th overall pick

Career history
- Kansas City Chiefs (2001–2003); San Diego Chargers (2004)

Career NFL statistics
- Tackles: 50
- Sacks: 2
- Passes defended: 2
- Stats at Pro Football Reference

Eric Lamont Downing (born September 16, 1978), is an American former professional football player who was a defensive tackle in the National Football League (NFL). He played for Syracuse and was selected in the third round of the 2001 NFL Draft.

== Early life and college ==
Downing attended John F. Kennedy High School, in Paterson, New Jersey, where he was selected for the first-team All-State.

Downing played college football at Syracuse University for Paul Pasqualoni. He was named to the ALL-Big East team in 2000.

== NFL career statistics ==
Legend
**Bold**	Career high

Year	Team	Games		Tackles					Interceptions					Fumbles			
Year	Team	GP	GS	Cmb	Solo	Ast	Sck	TFL	Int	Yds	TD	Lng	PD	FF	FR	Yds	TD
2001	KAN	15	9	**25**	**18**	**7**	**1.5**	**3**	0	0	0	0	**1**	0	0	0	0
2002	KAN	13	4	14	10	4	0.5	1	0	0	0	0	**1**	0	0	0	0
2003	KAN	14	0	10	7	3	0.0	1	0	0	0	0	0	0	0	0	0
2004	SDG	3	0	1	1	0	0.0	0	0	0	0	0	0	0	0	0	0
Career		45	13	50	36	14	2.0	5	0	0	0	0	2	0	0	0	0
