= Eric Warfield =

American football player (born 1976)

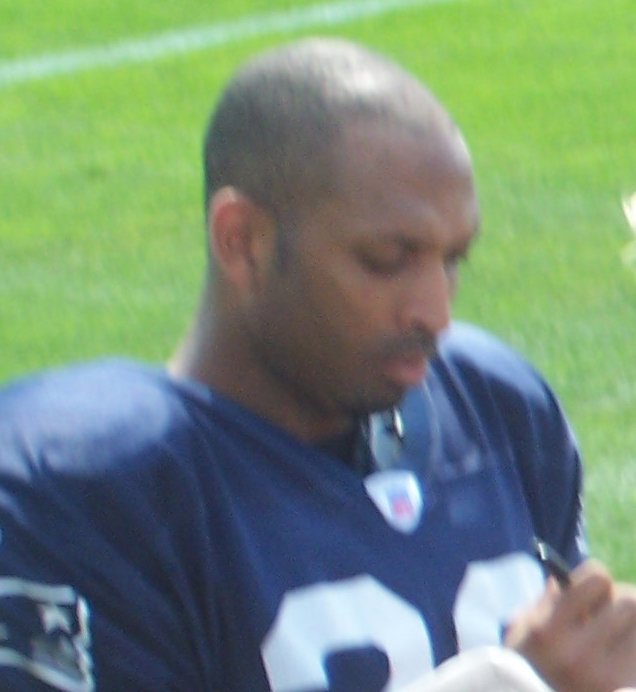
- Warfield at 2006 New England Patriots training camp

No. 44, 23
- Position: Cornerback

Personal information
- Born: March 3, 1976 (age 50); Texarkana, Arkansas, U.S.
- Listed height: 6 ft 0 in (1.83 m)
- Listed weight: 200 lb (91 kg)

Career information
- High school: Arkansas (Texarkana)
- College: Nebraska
- NFL draft: 1998: 7th round, 216th overall pick

Career history
- Kansas City Chiefs (1998–2005); New England Patriots (2006)*
- * Offseason or practice squad member only

Awards and highlights
- 3× National champion (1994, 1995, 1997)

Career NFL statistics
- Tackles: 385
- Sacks: 1
- Interceptions: 20
- Stats at Pro Football Reference

Eric Andrew Warfield (born March 3, 1976) is an American former professional football player who was a cornerback for the Kansas City Chiefs of the National Football League (NFL). He played college football for the Nebraska Cornhuskers and was selected by the Kansas City Chiefs in the seventh round of the 1998 NFL draft. Warfield also spent a portion of the 2006 offseason with the New England Patriots.

== Professional career ==
=== Kansas City Chiefs ===
Warfield finished the 2004 NFL season with 45 tackles after three straight years of over 70. He also intercepted four passes (one for a touchdown), and forced two fumbles in 2004.

In 2005, Warfield struggled with legal issues that threatened his NFL career. On March 3, he was convicted of a third DUI charge and was sentenced to 10 days in jail and 80 days of house arrest. In the wake of this incident, the NFL suspended Warfield for the first four games of the 2005 season.

=== New England Patriots ===
On April 3, 2006, Warfield was signed by the New England Patriots but was released shortly after training camp, never playing in a regular season game for the team.

== NFL career statistics ==
Legend
**Bold**	Career high

Year	Team	Games		Tackles				Interceptions				Fumbles			
Year	Team	GP	GS	Comb	Solo	Ast	Sck	Int	Yds	TD	Lng	FF	FR	Yds	TD
1998	KAN	12	0	0	0	0	0.0	0	0	0	0	0	0	0	0
1999	KAN	16	1	37	32	5	0.0	3	0	0	0	0	0	0	0
2000	KAN	13	3	26	22	4	0.0	0	0	0	0	0	0	0	0
2001	KAN	16	16	**77**	**69**	**8**	0.0	**4**	**61**	**1**	51	**3**	0	0	0
2002	KAN	16	16	64	56	**8**	0.0	**4**	30	0	19	0	1	0	0
2003	KAN	15	15	66	62	4	**1.0**	**4**	39	0	20	1	0	0	0
2004	KAN	16	16	58	50	**8**	0.0	**4**	49	**1**	43	1	0	0	0
2005	KAN	11	10	57	53	4	0.0	1	57	**1**	**57**	0	**2**	0	0
		115	77	385	344	41	1.0	20	236	3	57	5	3	0	0
