= Ike Charlton =

American gridiron football player and coach (born 1977)

Personal information
- Born: October 6, 1977 (age 49); Orlando, Florida, U.S.
- Listed height: 6 ft 0 in (1.83 m)
- Listed weight: 207 lb (94 kg)

Career information
- High school: Dr. Phillips (Orlando)
- College: Virginia Tech
- NFL draft: 2000: 2nd round, 52nd overall pick

Career history

Playing
- Seattle Seahawks (2000–2001); Jacksonville Jaguars (2002); New York Giants (2003); Oakland Raiders (2004)*; New England Patriots (2005)*; Winnipeg Blue Bombers (2005–2006); Detroit Lions (2007)*; Winnipeg Blue Bombers (2007–2010); Montreal Alouettes (2010)
- * Offseason or practice squad member only

Coaching
- Ottawa Redblacks (DBC) (2014–2017); Lake Erie Storm (STC/DBC) (2019); Toronto Argonauts (DBC) (2020)

Awards and highlights
- Grey Cup champion (2016); First-team All-American (1999)
- Stats at Pro Football Reference

Isaiah "Ike" Charlton (born October 6, 1977) is an American football coach and former player who is the defensive backs coach for the Toronto Argonauts of the Canadian Football League (CFL). As a player, he was a defensive back who spent most of his professional career playing for the Winnipeg Blue Bombers of the CFL. He was selected by the Seattle Seahawks of the National Football League (NFL) in the second round (52nd overall) of the 2000 NFL draft. He played college football for the Virginia Tech Hokies.

Charlton has also been a member of the Jacksonville Jaguars, New York Giants, Oakland Raiders, New England Patriots, Detroit Lions, and Montreal Alouettes.

== Early life ==
Charlton was born in Orlando, Florida and played high school football at Dr. Phillips High School. He played offense and defense, but mainly quarterback his senior season.

== Professional career ==
He has spent time with the Seahawks (2000–2001), the Jaguars (2002), NY Giants (2003) and the Raiders (2004) where he did not make the final roster cut. Charlton was cut by the Raiders in September 2004, and joined the Patriots in February 2005 for the 2005 season.

Charlton signed with the Winnipeg Blue Bombers of the Canadian Football League on October 13, near the end of the 2005 CFL season and, besides a break in 2007, when he attended the Detroit Lions training camp, has remained with the Blue Bombers. He re-signed as a free agent with Winnipeg on February 17, 2009, after receiving a matching offer from the Hamilton Tiger-Cats.

On August 2, 2010, Charlton was released by the Blue Bombers.

On October 19, 2010, the Montreal Alouettes signed Charlton to the practice roster.

=== NFL statistics ===
Year	Team	Games	Combined tackles	Tackles	Assisted tackles	Sacks	Forced fumbles	Fumble recoveries	Fumble return yards	Interceptions	Interception return yards	Yards per interception return	Longest interception return	Interceptions returned for touchdown	Passes defended
2000	SEA	16	14	10	4	0.0	1	0	0	0	0	0	0	0	0
2001	SEA	15	31	29	2	1.0	3	0	0	2	43	22	38	1	4
2002	JAX	15	24	23	1	1.0	0	0	0	0	0	0	0	0	2
2003	NYG	7	12	9	3	0.0	0	0	0	0	0	0	0	0	1
Career		53	81	71	10	2.0	4	0	0	2	43	22	38	1	7

== Coaching career ==
Charlton coached for Freedom High School in Orlando, Florida.

After guest coaching with the Calgary Stampeders and Edmonton Eskimos in 2012 and 2013 respectively, Charlton was hired as the defensive backs coach for the Ottawa Redblacks on December 20, 2013. He was a coach with Ottawa for four years and won his first Grey Cup championship in 2016.

On February 6, 2020, it was announced that Charlton was joining the Toronto Argonauts as the team's defensive backs coach.
