= Shaunard Harts =

American football player (born 1978)

No. 42
- Position: Safety

Personal information
- Born: August 4, 1978 (age 48); Pittsburg, California, U.S.
- Listed height: 6 ft 0 in (1.83 m)
- Listed weight: 207 lb (94 kg)

Career information
- College: Boise State
- NFL draft: 2001: 7th round, 212th overall pick

Career history
- Kansas City Chiefs (2001–2004); Seattle Seahawks (2006)*
- * Offseason or practice squad member only

Career NFL statistics
- Tackles: 171
- Interceptions: 2
- Touchdowns: 1
- Stats at Pro Football Reference

Shaunard Trudell Harts (born August 4, 1978) is an American former professional football player who was a safety for the Kansas City Chiefs of the National Football League (NFL) from 2001 to 2004. He played college football for the Boise State Broncos.

Born and raised in Pittsburg, California; Shaunard excelled at basketball and football while attending Pittsburg High School. Although he played as a safety at Boise State University and in the NFL, Shaunard starred as a wide receiver in high school. He was selected in the seventh round of the 2001 NFL draft, as was fellow Pittsburg native, Joe Tafoya.
