= Larry Parker (American football) =

American football player (born 1976)

No. 80
- Position: Wide receiver

Personal information
- Born: July 14, 1976 (age 50); Bakersfield, California, U.S.
- Listed height: 6 ft 1 in (1.85 m)
- Listed weight: 205 lb (93 kg)

Career information
- High school: Bakersfield
- College: USC
- NFL draft: 1999: 4th round, 108th overall pick

Career history
- Kansas City Chiefs (1999–2001)

Career NFL statistics
- Games played: 38
- Receptions: 18
- Yards: 240
- Touchdowns: 2
- Stats at Pro Football Reference

Larry Parker Jr. (born July 14, 1976) is an American former professional football player who was a wide receiver for the Kansas City Chiefs of the National Football League (NFL). He played college football for the USC Trojans. Parker was selected by the Chiefs in the fourth round of the 1999 NFL draft.
