= Harold Blackmon =

American football player (born 1978)

No. 28
- Position: Safety

Personal information
- Born: May 20, 1978 (age 48); Chicago, Illinois, U.S.
- Listed height: 5 ft 11 in (1.80 m)
- Listed weight: 216 lb (98 kg)

Career information
- High school: Leo (Chicago)
- College: Northwestern
- NFL draft: 2001: 7th round, 210th overall pick

Career history
- Seattle Seahawks (2001–2002)

Career NFL statistics
- Games played: 9
- Total tackles: 3
- Pass deflections: 1
- Stats at Pro Football Reference

Harold Blackmon (born May 20, 1978) is an American former professional football player who was a safety in the National Football League (NFL) for the Seattle Seahawks. He played college football for the Northwestern Wildcats and was selected in the seventh round of the 2001 NFL draft. The Seahawks cut Blackmon on August 13, 2003, prior to the start of the season. After leaving the NFL, Blackmon became a college and high school football coach in the Chicagoland area. This includes tenures as a head coach at St. Laurence High School, Oak Lawn Community High School, and De La Salle Institute, where he currently serves as the head football coach. He also served as an assistant coach at Northwestern University, North Park University, and Leo Catholic High School.
