= Chris Thomas (American football) =

American football player (born 1971)

No. 89, 83, 87
- Position: Wide receiver

Personal information
- Born: July 16, 1971 (age 55); Burbank, California, U.S.
- Listed height: 6 ft 0 in (1.83 m)
- Listed weight: 190 lb (86 kg)

Career information
- College: Cal Poly
- NFL draft: 1993: undrafted

Career history
- San Diego Chargers (1993–1994)*; San Francisco 49ers (1995); Washington Redskins (1997–1999); St. Louis Rams (1999); Minnesota Vikings (2000)*; St. Louis Rams (2000); Kansas City Chiefs (2001)
- * Offseason or practice squad member only

Awards and highlights
- Cal Poly Hall of Fame, 2007

Career NFL statistics
- Receptions: 51
- Receiving yards: 592
- Touchdowns: 1
- Stats at Pro Football Reference

Chris Eric Thomas (born July 16, 1971) is an American former professional football player who was a wide receiver in the National Football League (NFL). He played college football for the Cal Poly Mustangs. He played in the NFL for the San Francisco 49ers, the Washington Redskins, the St. Louis Rams, and the Kansas City Chiefs.

Thomas attended Ventura College before transferring to California Polytechnic State University, San Luis Obispo, where he majored in English and was a preseason Harlon Hill Award candidate with the Mustangs in 1992. Although he played sparingly his final year of NCAA football due to injuries, he launched his pro career by signing with the then-San Diego Chargers in May 1993.

Collegiate Statistics
School	Season	Rec.	Rec. Yds.	Avg.	LG	TD	KR	Kick. Ret. Yds.	Avg.	LG	TD
Ventura (Fr.)	1989	18	288	16.0	n/a	4	16	392	24.5	unknown	0
Ventura (So.)	1990	33	381	11.5	n/a	5	33	737	22.3	unknown	2
Cal Poly (Jr.)	1991	48	877	18.3	89t	5	16	461	28.8	91t	1
Cal Poly (Sr.)	1992	7	96	13.7	n/a	n/a	n/a	n/a	n/a	n/a	n/a
Totals		106	1,642	15.5	89t	14	65	1,590	24.5	n/a	3
