= 2000 Kansas City Chiefs season =

NFL team season

- Owner: Lamar Hunt
- General manager: Carl Peterson
- Head coach: Gunther Cunningham
- Offensive coordinator: Jimmy Raye II
- Defensive coordinator: Kurt Schottenheimer
- Home stadium: Arrowhead Stadium

Results
- Record: 7–9
- Division place: 3rd AFC West
- Playoffs: Did not qualify
- All-Pros: 1: TE Tony Gonzalez (1st team)
- Pro Bowlers: 3: QB Elvis Grbac; TE Tony Gonzalez; G Will Shields

The 2000 season was the Kansas City Chiefs' 31st in the National Football League (NFL), their 41st overall and their second and final season under head coach Gunther Cunningham. They failed to improve on their 9–7 record from 1999 and finished the season 7–9, marked by a series of on and off-field struggles and incidents.

In the offseason, 9-time Pro Bowl linebacker, team captain, and fan favorite Derrick Thomas died of a pulmonary embolism that occurred due to becoming paralyzed following a January car accident. He was the first of three active NFL players to die in the 2000 offseason, along with Raiders safety Eric Turner (cancer) and Panthers running back Fred Lane (homicide).

In the Week 10 game against the Oakland Raiders, Chiefs quarterback Elvis Grbac set a franchise record for passing yards in a single game with 504.

The Chiefs gave the San Diego Chargers their only victory of the season, losing to them in Week 13.

After the season, Warren Moon, who had been in the NFL since 1984, retired.

== Offseason ==
Additions	Subtractions
P Todd Sauerbrun (Bears)	C Jeff Smith (Jaguars)
TE Troy Drayton (Dolphins)	LB Derrick Thomas (Car Crash)
DT Steve Martin (Eagles)	WR Joe Horn (Saints)
LB Lewis Bush (Chargers)	CB Cris Dishman (Vikings)
TE Jason Dunn (Eagles)	WR Andre Rison (Raiders)
DE Duane Clemons (Vikings)	DT Tom Barndt (Bengals)
	T Glenn Parker (Giants)
	DE Leslie O'Neal (retirement)

=== Draft ===
2000 Kansas City Chiefs draft
Round	Pick	Player	Position	College	Notes
1	21	Sylvester Morris	Wide receiver	Jackson State	
2	54	William Bartee	Cornerback	Oklahoma	
3	85	Greg Wesley	Safety	Arkansas–Pine Bluff	
4	115	Frank Moreau	Running back	Louisville	
5	153	Dante Hall *	Wide receiver	Texas A&M	
5	162	Pat Dennis	Cornerback	Louisiana–Monroe	
6	188	Darnell Alford	Guard	Boston College	
7	208	Desmond Kitchings	Wide receiver	Furman	
Made roster * Made at least one Pro Bowl during career

=== Undrafted free agents ===
2000 undrafted free agents of note
Player	Position	College
Arland Bruce	Wide receiver	Minnesota
Brian Hinton	Cornerback	Southeast Missouri State
Jonathan Jackson	Linebacker	Oregon State
Percy King	Safety	Ohio State
Norris McCleary	Defensive tackle	East Carolina
Brock McGrew	Wide receiver	North Texas
Kirk McMullen	Tight end	Pittsburgh
Andre O'Neal	Linebacker	Marshall
Joe Perez	Wide receiver	Murray State
Josh Rawlings	Tackle	Minnesota

== Personnel ==
=== Staff / Coaches ===
2000 Kansas City Chiefs staff
Front office: Founder – Lamar Hunt; Chairman of the board – Jack Steadman; President/general manager/chief executive officer – Carl Peterson; Executive vice president/assistant general manager – Dennis Thum; Director of pro personnel – Bill Kuharich; Head coaches: Head coach – Gunther Cunningham; Assistant head coach/defensive backs – Willie Shaw; Offensive coaches: Offensive coordinator – Jimmy Raye; Quarterbacks – Tom Clements; Running backs – Al Lavan; Wide receivers – Richard Mann; Tight ends – Keith Rowen; Offensive line – Mike Solari; Offensive assistant/quality control – Jim Hostler	Defensive coaches: Defensive coordinator – Kurt Schottenheimer; Defensive line – Bob Karmelowicz; Assistant defensive line – Tom Pratt; Linebackers – Joe Vitt; Defensive assistant/quality control – Darvin Wallis; Special teams coaches: Special teams – Mike Stock; Strength and conditioning: Strength and conditioning – Jeff Hurd; Assistant strength and conditioning – Jeff Fish

=== Roster ===
2000 Kansas City Chiefs roster
Quarterbacks (QB): 15 Todd Collins; 18 Elvis Grbac; 1 Warren Moon; Running backs (RB): 38 Kimble Anders; 30 Donnell Bennett FB; 34 Mike Cloud; 20 Dante Hall; 46 Frank Moreau; 49 Tony Richardson FB; Wide receivers (WR): 82 Derrick Alexander; 81 Kevin Lockett; 84 Sylvester Morris; 80 Larry Parker; Tight ends (TE): 87 Troy Drayton; 89 Jason Dunn; 88 Tony Gonzalez; 85 Mikhael Ricks	Offensive linemen (OL): 72 Darnell Alford T; 69 Jeff Blackshear G; 61 Tim Grunhard C; 73 Willie Jones T; 66 Victor Riley T; 68 Will Shields G; 76 John Tait T; 54 Brian Waters G; 60 Donald Willis C; Defensive linemen (DL): 93 John Browning DT; 99 Duane Clemons DE; 98 Eric Hicks DE; 90 Steve Martin DT; 71 Norris McCleary DT; 75 Chester McGlockton DT; 95 Derrick Ransom DT; 92 Dan Williams DT; 96 Tyrone Williams DT	Linebackers (LB): 51 Lewis Bush OLB; 59 Donnie Edwards OLB; 55 Ron George OLB; 57 Mike Maslowski OLB; 53 Marvcus Patton MLB; 56 Gary Stills OLB; Defensive backs (DB): 35 Larry Atkins FS; 24 William Bartee CB; 41 Pat Dennis CB; 23 Carlton Gray CB; 40 James Hasty CB; 27 Bracy Walker SS; 44 Eric Warfield CB; 25 Greg Wesley SS; 21 Jerome Woods FS; Special teams (ST): 83 Kendall Gammon LS; 2 Todd Peterson K; 5 Todd Sauerbrun P	Practice squad: 65 John Blick T; 6 Arland Bruce WR; 94 Kendrick Gholston DE; 17 Ricky Hall WR; 50 Casey Tisdale LB; Reserve: 67 Brad Kubik G (IR); 52 Andre O'Neal LB (IR); 97 Ty Parten DT (IR); 12 Joe Perez WR (IR); 70 Marcus Spears T (IR); 79 Dave Szott G (IR); 64 Thomas Washington DT (IR); Rookies in italics 53 active, 7 reserve, 5 practice squad

== Preseason ==
=== Schedule ===
Week	Date	Opponent	Result	Record	Venue	Recap
1	August 5	at Tennessee Titans	L 10–14	0–1	Adelphia Coliseum	Recap
2	August 13	San Francisco 49ers	L 10–33	0–2	Arrowhead Stadium	Recap
3	August 19	Jacksonville Jaguars	L 22–26	0–3	Arrowhead Stadium	Recap
4	August 25	at Tampa Bay Buccaneers	L 14–37	0–4	Raymond James Stadium	Recap

=== Game summaries ===
==== Week 1: at Tennessee Titans ====
Week 1: Kansas City Chiefs at Tennessee Titans – Game summary

Quarter	1	2	3	4	Total
Chiefs	7	3	0	0	10
Titans	0	14	0	0	14

at Adelphia Coliseum, Nashville, Tennessee

- Date: August 5
- Game time: 7:00 p.m. CDT
- Game weather: Sunny, 86 °F (30 °C)
- Game attendance: 68,016
- Referee: Tom White
- Recap, Game Book

Game information

First quarter

- KC – Tony Gonzalez 15-yard pass from Elvis Grbac (Pete Stoyanovich kick), 0:12. Chiefs 7–0. Drive: 11 plays, 91 yards, 6:02.

Second quarter

- TEN – Carl Pickens 2-yard pass from Steve McNair (Al Del Greco kick), 14:52. Tied 7–7. Drive: 10 plays, 72 yards, 5:19.
- TEN – Rodney Thomas 1-yard run (Al Del Greco kick), 3:39. Titans 14–7. Drive: 7 plays, 63 yards, 3:25.
- KC – Pete Stoyanovich 34-yard field goal, 0:46. Titans 14–10. Drive: 6 plays, 63 yards, 0:51.

Third quarter

- No scoring plays.

Fourth quarter

- No scoring plays.

Top passers

- KC – Ted White – 9/23, 99 yards, INT
- TEN – Neil O'Donnell – 7/12, 78 yards

Top rushers

- KC – Dante Hall – 1 rush, 17 yards
- TEN – Mike Green – 12 rushes, 29 yards

Top receivers

- KC – Kevin Lockett – 3 receptions, 34 yards
- TEN – Gerald Harris – 1 reception, 47 yards

==== Week 2: vs. San Francisco 49ers ====
Week 2: San Francisco 49ers at Kansas City Chiefs – Game summary

Quarter	1	2	3	4	Total
49ers	14	16	0	3	33
Chiefs	0	0	7	3	10

at Arrowhead Stadium, Kansas City, Missouri

- Date: August 13
- Game time: 7:30 p.m. CDT
- Game weather: Clear, 91 °F (33 °C)
- Game attendance: 76,682
- Referee: Phil Luckett
- Recap, Game Book

Game information

First quarter

- SF – Jeff Garcia 2-yard run (Wade Richey kick), 9:45. 49ers 7–0. Drive: 7 plays, 54 yards, 3:46.
- SF – Terrell Owens 2-yard pass from Jeff Garcia (Wade Richey kick), 0:46. 49ers 14–0. Drive: 12 plays, 80 yards, 6:36.

Second quarter

- SF – Jerry Rice 75-yard pass from Rick Mirer (kick failed, wide left), 10:41. 49ers 20–0. Drive: 5 plays, 96 yards, 2:36.
- SF – Wade Richey 40-yard field goal, 5:51. 49ers 23–0. Drive: 6 plays, 13 yards, 3:09.
- SF – Terry Jackson 1-yard run (Wade Richey kick), 4:05. 49ers 30–0. Drive: 3 plays, 14 yards, 1:25.

Third quarter

- KC – Larry Parker 25-yard pass from Warren Moon (Pete Stoyanovich kick), 7:32. 49ers 30–7. Drive: 11 plays, 66 yards, 5:22.

Fourth quarter

- KC – Pete Stoyanovich 25-yard field goal, 14:20. 49ers 30–10. Drive: 15 plays, 60 yards, 7:48.
- SF – Wade Richey 29-yard field goal, 2:25. 49ers 33–10. Drive: 4 plays, 9 yards, 2:06.

Top passers

- SF – Rick Mirer – 5/6, 114 yards, TD, INT
- KC – Warren Moon – 12/19, 113 yards, TD, INT

Top rushers

- SF – Jonas Lewis – 11 rushes, 62 yards
- KC – Frank Moreau – 8 rushes, 41 yards

Top receivers

- SF – Jerry Rice – 3 receptions, 84 yards, TD
- KC – Larry Parker – 4 receptions, 50 yards, TD

==== Week 3: vs. Jacksonville Jaguars ====
Week 3: Jacksonville Jaguars at Kansas City Chiefs – Game summary

Quarter	1	2	3	4	Total
Jaguars	0	10	3	13	26
Chiefs	3	3	3	13	22

at Arrowhead Stadium, Kansas City, Missouri

- Date: August 19
- Game time: 7:30 p.m. CDT
- Game weather: Overcast, 73 °F (23 °C)
- Game attendance: 75,120
- Referee: Ron Blum
- Recap, Game Book

Game information

First quarter

- KC – Pete Stoyanovich 27-yard field goal, 1:51. Chiefs 3–0. Drive: 16 plays, 79 yards, 7:42.

Second quarter

- JAX – Jimmy Smith 32-yard pass from Mark Brunell (Mike Hollis kick), 13:35. Jaguars 7–3. Drive: 8 plays, 64 yards, 3:16.
- KC – Pete Stoyanovich 38-yard field goal, 0:34. Jaguars 7–6. Drive: 6 plays, 40 yards, 0:56.
- JAX – Mike Hollis 46-yard field goal, 0:00. Jaguars 10–6. Drive: 5 plays, 42 yards, 0:34.

Third quarter

- JAX – Mike Hollis 37-yard field goal, 9:29. Jaguars 13–6. Drive: 7 plays, 35 yards, 3:28.
- KC – Pete Stoyanovich 22-yard field goal, 3:45. Jaguars 13–9. Drive: 13 plays, 67 yards, 5:44.

Fourth quarter

- KC – Bracy Walker 20-yard fumble return (Pete Stoyanovich kick), 13:10. Chiefs 16–13.
- JAX – Mike Hollis 32-yard field goal, 8:23. Tied 16–16. Drive: 9 plays, 67 yards, 4:47.
- JAX – Mike Hollis 27-yard field goal, 6:15. Jaguars 19–16. Drive: 4 plays, 2 yards, 0:50.
- JAX – Shyrone Stith 78-yard run (Mike Hollis kick), 3:50. Jaguars 26–16. Drive: 2 plays, 81 yards, 0:57.
- KC – Kirby Dar Dar 6-yard pass from Todd Collins (pass failed), 2:51. Jaguars 26–22. Drive: 6 plays, 69 yards, 0:59.

Top passers

- JAX – Mark Brunell – 9/14, 115 yards, TD
- KC – Todd Collins – 12/24, 125 yards, TD

Top rushers

- JAX – Shyrone Stith – 9 rushes, 103 yards, TD
- KC – Mike Cloud – 9 rushes, 35 yards

Top receivers

- JAX – Keenan McCardell – 5 receptions, 89 yards
- KC – Tony Gonzalez – 3 receptions, 44 yards

==== Week 4: at Tampa Bay Buccaneers ====
Week 4: Kansas City Chiefs at Tampa Bay Buccaneers – Game summary

Quarter	1	2	3	4	Total
Chiefs	7	0	0	7	14
Buccaneers	7	13	7	10	37

at Raymond James Stadium, Tampa, Florida

- Date: August 24
- Game time: 7:30 p.m. EDT/6:30 p.m. CDT
- Game weather: Partly cloudy, 87 °F (31 °C)
- Game attendance: 64,267
- Referee: Bob McElwee
- Recap, Game Book

Game information

First quarter

- TB – Mike Alstott 3-yard run (Martín Gramática kick), 12:22. Buccaneers 7–0. Drive: 3 plays, 12 yards, 1:24.
- KC – Donnie Edwards 61-yard interception return (Pete Stoyanovich kick), 6:15. Tied 7–7.

Second quarter

- TB – Mike Alstott 1-yard run (Martín Gramática kick), 14:51. Buccaneers 14–7. Drive: 10 plays, 84 yards, 6:24.
- TB – Martín Gramática 27-yard field goal, 2:15. Buccaneers 17–7. Drive: 9 plays, 62 yards, 4:54.
- TB – Martín Gramática 36-yard field goal, 0:07. Buccaneers 20–7. Drive: 8 plays, 36 yards, 1:19.

Third quarter

- TB – Aaron Stecker 3-yard run (Martín Gramática kick), 11:59. Buccaneers 27–7. Drive: 1 play, 3 yards, 0:06.

Fourth quarter

- TB – Martín Gramática 41-yard field goal, 11:17. Buccaneers 30–7. Drive: 8 plays, 32 yards, 3:58.
- TB – David Gibson 3-yard fumble return (Martín Gramática kick), 11:03. Buccaneers 37–7.
- KC – Frank Moreau 23-yard run (Pete Stoyanovich kick), 8:05. Buccaneers 37–14. Drive: 6 plays, 75 yards, 2:58.

Top passers

- KC – Warren Moon – 4/9, 81 yards
- TB – Eric Zeier – 8/16, 88 yards

Top rushers

- KC – Frank Moreau – 11 rushes, 66 yards, TD
- TB – Warrick Dunn – 5 rushes, 60 yards

Top receivers

- KC – Kirby Dar Dar – 2 receptions, 57 yards
- TB – Andre Hastings – 2 receptions, 43 yards

== Regular season ==
=== Schedule ===
Week	Date	Opponent	Result	Record	Venue	Recap
1	September 3	Indianapolis Colts	**L** 14–27	0–1	Arrowhead Stadium	Recap
2	September 10	at Tennessee Titans	**L** 14–17 (OT)	0–2	Adelphia Coliseum	Recap
3	September 17	**San Diego Chargers**	**W** 42–10	1–2	Arrowhead Stadium	Recap
4	September 24	at **Denver Broncos**	**W** 23–22	2–2	Mile High Stadium	Recap
5	October 2	**Seattle Seahawks**	**W** 24–17	3–2	Arrowhead Stadium	Recap
6	Bye					
7	October 15	**Oakland Raiders**	**L** 17–20	3–3	Arrowhead Stadium	Recap
8	October 22	St. Louis Rams	**W** 54–34	4–3	Arrowhead Stadium	Recap
9	October 29	at **Seattle Seahawks**	**W** 24–19	5–3	Husky Stadium	Recap
10	November 5	at **Oakland Raiders**	**L** 31–49	5–4	Network Associates Coliseum	Recap
11	November 12	at San Francisco 49ers	**L** 7–21	5–5	3Com Park	Recap
12	November 19	Buffalo Bills	**L** 17–21	5–6	Arrowhead Stadium	Recap
13	November 26	at **San Diego Chargers**	**L** 16–17	5–7	Qualcomm Stadium	Recap
14	December 4	at New England Patriots	**L** 24–30	5–8	Foxboro Stadium	Recap
15	December 10	Carolina Panthers	**W** 15–14	6–8	Arrowhead Stadium	Recap
16	December 17	**Denver Broncos**	**W** 20–7	7–8	Arrowhead Stadium	Recap
17	December 24	at Atlanta Falcons	**L** 13–29	7–9	Georgia Dome	Recap
Note: Intra-division opponents are in **bold** text.

=== Game summaries ===
==== Week 1: vs. Indianapolis Colts ====
Week 1: Indianapolis Colts at Kansas City Chiefs – Game summary

Quarter	1	2	3	4	Total
**Colts**	0	7	7	13	**27**
Chiefs	0	7	7	0	**14**

at Arrowhead Stadium, Kansas City, Missouri

- Date: September 3
- Game time: 12:00 p.m. CDT
- Game weather: Mostly sunny, 90 °F (32 °C)
- Game attendance: 78,357
- Referee: Larry Nemmers
- TV announcers (CBS): Verne Lundquist, Dan Dierdorf and Bonnie Bernstein
- Recap, Game Book

Game information

**First quarter**

- No scoring plays.

**Second quarter**

- IND – Edgerrin James 1-yard run (Mike Vanderjagt kick), 14:15. Colts 7–0. **Drive: 11 plays, 92 yards, 6:20.**
- KC – Tony Richardson 11-yard pass from Elvis Grbac (Pete Stoyanovich kick), 5:23. Tied 7–7. **Drive: 3 plays, 51 yards, 1:22.**

**Third quarter**

- IND – Edgerrin James 27-yard pass from Peyton Manning (Mike Vanderjagt kick), 8:23. Colts 14–7. **Drive: 5 plays, 54 yards, 2:44.**
- KC – Derrick Alexander 21-yard pass from Elvis Grbac (Pete Stoyanovich kick), 4:25. Tied 14–14. **Drive: 9 plays, 76 yards, 3:58.**

**Fourth quarter**

- IND – Mike Vanderjagt 23-yard field goal, 13:37. Colts 17–14. **Drive: 9 plays, 27 yards, 3:56.**
- IND – Jeff Burris 27-yard interception return (Mike Vanderjagt kick), 12:38. Colts 24–14.
- IND – Mike Vanderjagt 40-yard field goal, 4:01. Colts 27–14. **Drive: 9 plays, 58 yards, 4:50.**

**Top passers**

- IND – Peyton Manning – 22/32, 273 yards, TD, INT
- KC – Elvis Grbac – 16/37, 212 yards, 2 TD, INT

**Top rushers**

- IND – Edgerrin James – 28 rushes, 124 yards, TD
- KC – Tony Richardson – 13 rushes, 58 yards

**Top receivers**

- IND – Marvin Harrison – 9 receptions, 115 yards
- KC – Sylvester Morris – 3 receptions, 58 yards

==== Week 2: at Tennessee Titans ====
Week 2: Kansas City Chiefs at Tennessee Titans – Game summary

Quarter	1	2	3	4	OT	Total
Chiefs	0	7	0	7	0	**14**
**Titans**	0	7	0	7	3	**17**

at Adelphia Coliseum, Nashville, Tennessee

- Date: September 10
- Game time: 12:00 p.m. CDT
- Game weather: Cloudy and humid, 80 °F (27 °C)
- Game attendance: 68,203
- Referee: Mike Carey
- TV announcers (CBS): Ian Eagle and Mark May
- Recap, Game Book

Game information

**First quarter**

- No scoring plays.

**Second quarter**

- TEN – Kevin Dyson 30-yard pass from Frank Wycheck (Al Del Greco kick), 1:42. Titans 7–0. **Drive: 11 plays, 91 yards, 6:02.**
- KC – Donnie Edwards 42-yard interception return (Pete Stoyanovich kick), 0:12. Tied 7–7.

**Third quarter**

- No scoring plays.

**Fourth quarter**

- KC – Derrick Alexander 16-yard pass from Elvis Grbac (Pete Stoyanovich kick), 14:55. Chiefs 14–7. **Drive: 6 plays, 31 yards, 2:58.**
- TEN – Yancey Thigpen 8-yard pass from Neil O'Donnell (Al Del Greco kick), 0:50. Tied 14–14. **Drive: 8 plays, 56 yards, 1:53.**

**Overtime**

- TEN – Al Del Greco 36-yard field goal, 12:02. Titans 17–14. **Drive: 5 plays, 48 yards, 2:58.**

**Top passers**

- KC – Elvis Grbac – 13/21, 144 yards, TD
- TEN – Neil O'Donnell – 11/17, 132 yards, TD

**Top rushers**

- KC – Tony Richardson – 14 rushes, 28 yards
- TEN – Eddie George – 21 rushes, 80 yards

**Top receivers**

- KC – Derrick Alexander – 5 receptions, 54 yards, TD
- TEN – Kevin Dyson – 6 receptions, 104 yards, TD

==== Week 3: vs. San Diego Chargers ====
Week 3: San Diego Chargers at Kansas City Chiefs – Game summary

Quarter	1	2	3	4	Total
Chargers	10	0	0	0	**10**
**Chiefs**	0	14	14	14	**42**

at Arrowhead Stadium, Kansas City, Missouri

- Date: September 17
- Game time: 3:05 p.m. CDT
- Game weather: Clear, 88 °F (31 °C)
- Game attendance: 77,604
- Referee: Johnny Grier
- TV announcers (CBS): Ian Eagle and Mark May
- Recap, Game Book

Game information

**First quarter**

- SD – Mike Dumas 56-yard interception return (John Carney kick), 10:22. Chargers 7–0.
- SD – John Carney 54-yard field goal, 1:19. Chargers 10–0. **Drive: 10 plays, 39 yards, 3:36.**

**Second quarter**

- KC – Sylvester Morris 36-yard pass from Elvis Grbac (Pete Stoyanovich kick), 10:12. Chargers 10–7. **Drive: 4 plays, 73 yards, 2:02.**
- KC – Tony Richardson 1-yard pass from Elvis Grbac (Pete Stoyanovich kick), 0:47. Chiefs 14–10. **Drive: 2 plays, 45 yards, 0:24.**

**Third quarter**

- KC – Sylvester Morris 9-yard pass from Elvis Grbac (Pete Stoyanovich kick), 7:26. Chiefs 21–10. **Drive: 7 plays, 59 yards, 2:52.**
- KC – Troy Drayton 2-yard pass from Elvis Grbac (Pete Stoyanovich kick), 4:38. Chiefs 28–10. **Drive: 6 plays, 20 yards, 2:34.**

**Fourth quarter**

- KC – Sylvester Morris 20-yard pass from Elvis Grbac (Pete Stoyanovich kick), 12:26. Chiefs 35–10. **Drive: 5 plays, 57 yards, 2:19.**
- KC – Frank Moreau 1-yard run (Pete Stoyanovich kick), 1:57. Chiefs 42–10. **Drive: 13 plays, 60 yards, 7:50.**

**Top passers**

- SD – Moses Moreno – 11/22, 107 yards
- KC – Elvis Grbac – 20/33, 235 yards, 5 TD, INT

**Top rushers**

- SD – Moses Moreno – 4 rushes, 20 yards
- KC – Frank Moreau – 18 rushes, 58 yards, TD

**Top receivers**

- SD – Terrell Fletcher – 7 receptions, 66 yards
- KC – Sylvester Morris – 6 receptions, 112 yards, 3 TD

==== Week 4: at Denver Broncos ====
Week 4: Kansas City Chiefs at Denver Broncos – Game summary

Quarter	1	2	3	4	Total
**Chiefs**	7	0	7	9	**23**
Broncos	3	9	10	0	**22**

at Mile High Stadium, Denver, Colorado

- Date: September 24
- Game time: 3:15 p.m. CDT/2:15 p.m. MDT
- Game weather: Mostly cloudy, 36 °F (2 °C)
- Game attendance: 74,596
- Referee: Tom White
- TV announcers (CBS): Kevin Harlan, Randy Cross and Beasley Reece
- Recap, Game Book

Game information

**First quarter**

- KC – Tony Richardson 1-yard run (Pete Stoyanovich kick), 10:22. Chiefs 7–0. **Drive: 11 plays, 80 yards, 5:50.**
- DEN – Joe Nedney 22-yard field goal, 2:02. Chiefs 7–3. **Drive: 14 plays, 79 yards, 7:08.**

**Second quarter**

- DEN – Joe Nedney 20-yard field goal, 8:53. Chiefs 7–6. **Drive: 9 plays, 60 yards, 4:33.**
- DEN – Ray Crockett 26-yard interception return (pass failed), 6:40. Broncos 12–7.

**Third quarter**

- DEN – Mike Anderson 16-yard run (Joe Nedney kick), 11:26. Broncos 19–7. **Drive: 7 plays, 77 yards, 3:54.**
- KC – Tony Gonzalez 15-yard pass from Elvis Grbac (Pete Stoyanovich kick), 7:23. Broncos 19–14. **Drive: 7 plays, 74 yards, 4:03.**
- DEN – Joe Nedney 43-yard field goal, 3:56. Broncos 22–14. **Drive: 6 plays, 47 yards, 3:27.**

**Fourth quarter**

- KC – Pete Stoyanovich 42-yard field goal, 8:19. Broncos 22–17. **Drive: 4 plays, 1 yard, 0:50.**
- KC – Derrick Alexander 22-yard pass from Elvis Grbac (pass failed), 2:21. Chiefs 23–22. **Drive: 8 plays, 80 yards, 3:24.**

**Top passers**

- KC – Elvis Grbac – 21/33, 250 yards, 2 TD, 2 INT
- DEN – Gus Frerotte – 18/31, 208 yards, INT

**Top rushers**

- KC – Tony Richardson – 14 rushes, 35 yards, TD
- DEN – Mike Anderson – 22 rushes, 85 yards, TD

**Top receivers**

- KC – Tony Gonzalez – 10 receptions, 127 yards, TD
- DEN – Rod Smith – 8 receptions, 134 yards

==== Week 5: vs. Seattle Seahawks ====
Week 5: Seattle Seahawks at Kansas City Chiefs – Game summary

Quarter	1	2	3	4	Total
Seahawks	7	7	3	0	**17**
**Chiefs**	0	7	7	10	**24**

at Arrowhead Stadium, Kansas City, Missouri

- Date: October 2
- Game time: 8:00 p.m. CDT
- Game weather: Clear, 74 °F (23 °C)
- Game attendance: 78,502
- Referee: Ed Hochuli
- TV announcers (ABC): Al Michaels, Dan Fouts, Dennis Miller, Melissa Stark and Eric Dickerson
- Recap, Game Book

Game information

**First quarter**

- SEA – Itula Mili 1-yard pass from Jon Kitna (Rian Lindell kick), 1:34. Seahawks 7–0. **Drive: 14 plays, 72 yards, 9:00.**

**Second quarter**

- KC – Tony Gonzalez 15-yard pass from Elvis Grbac (Pete Stoyanovich kick), 6:59. Tied 7–7. **Drive: 8 plays, 78 yards, 4:18.**
- SEA – Shaun Alexander 7-yard run (Rian Lindell kick), 0:48. Seahawks 14–7. **Drive: 13 plays, 75 yards, 6:11.**

**Third quarter**

- SEA – Rian Lindell 27-yard field goal, 6:24. Seahawks 17–7. **Drive: 9 plays, 63 yards, 3:41.**
- KC – Derrick Alexander 17-yard pass from Elvis Grbac (Pete Stoyanovich kick), 2:15. Seahawks 17–14. **Drive: 3 plays, 95 yards, 1:12.**

**Fourth quarter**

- KC – Pete Stoyanovich 27-yard field goal, 11:42. Tied 17–17. **Drive: 10 plays, 44 yards, 3:21.**
- KC – Mike Cloud 15-yard run (Pete Stoyanovich kick), 4:26. Chiefs 24–17. **Drive: 4 plays, 51 yards, 1:42.**

**Top passers**

- SEA – Jon Kitna – 17/28, 140 yards, TD, INT
- KC – Elvis Grbac – 16/27, 256 yards, 2 TD

**Top rushers**

- SEA – Ricky Watters – 16 rushes, 97 yards
- KC – Tony Richardson – 11 rushes, 53 yards

**Top receivers**

- SEA – Darrell Jackson – 4 receptions, 51 yards
- KC – Derrick Alexander – 5 receptions, 153 yards, TD

==== Week 7: vs. Oakland Raiders ====
Week 7: Oakland Raiders at Kansas City Chiefs – Game summary

Quarter	1	2	3	4	Total
**Raiders**	7	0	3	10	**20**
Chiefs	0	17	0	0	**17**

at Arrowhead Stadium, Kansas City, Missouri

- Date: October 15
- Game time: 12:00 p.m. CDT
- Game weather: Overcast, 62 °F (17 °C)
- Game attendance: 79,025
- Referee: Tony Corrente
- TV announcers (CBS): Ian Eagle, Mark May and Marcus Allen
- Recap, Game Book

Game information

**First quarter**

- OAK – Napoleon Kaufman 4-yard pass from Rich Gannon (Sebastian Janikowski kick), 5:09. Raiders 7–0. **Drive: 14 plays, 80 yards, 7:05.**

**Second quarter**

- KC – Todd Peterson 27-yard field goal, 6:38. Raiders 7–3. **Drive: 12 plays, 55 yards, 6:26.**
- KC – Tony Gonzalez 14-yard pass from Elvis Grbac (Todd Peterson kick), 2:49. Chiefs 10–7. **Drive: 5 plays, 50 yards, 1:58.**
- KC – Tony Richardson 15-yard pass from Elvis Grbac (Todd Peterson kick), 0:12. Chiefs 17–7. **Drive: 7 plays, 60 yards, 0:52.**

**Third quarter**

- OAK – Sebastian Janikowski 47-yard field goal, 10:16. Chiefs 17–10. **Drive: 9 plays, 28 yards, 4:44.**

**Fourth quarter**

- OAK – Tyrone Wheatley 7-yard pass from Rich Gannon (Sebastian Janikowski kick), 9:25. Tied 17–17. **Drive: 14 plays, 80 yards, 8:08.**
- OAK – Sebastian Janikowski 43-yard field goal, 0:25. Raiders 20–17. **Drive: 8 plays, 64 yards, 2:15.**

**Top passers**

- OAK – Rich Gannon – 28/33, 244 yards, 2 TD
- KC – Elvis Grbac – 23/40, 288 yards, 2 TD

**Top rushers**

- OAK – Tyrone Wheatley – 15 rushes, 76 yards
- KC – Tony Richardson – 5 rushes, 25 yards

**Top receivers**

- OAK – Tim Brown – 5 receptions, 89 yards
- KC – Tony Gonzalez – 7 receptions, 100 yards, TD

==== Week 8: vs. St. Louis Rams ====
Week 8: St. Louis Rams at Kansas City Chiefs – Game summary

Quarter	1	2	3	4	Total
Rams	0	14	14	6	**34**
**Chiefs**	20	7	13	14	**54**

at Arrowhead Stadium, Kansas City, Missouri

- Date: October 22
- Game time: 12:00 p.m. CDT
- Game weather: Overcast, 64 °F (18 °C)
- Game attendance: 79,142
- Referee: Mike Carey
- TV announcers (Fox): Dick Stockton, Matt Millen and Pam Oliver
- Recap, Game Book

Game information

**First quarter**

- KC – Frank Moreau 2-yard run (Todd Peterson kick), 13:04. Chiefs 7–0. **Drive: 4 plays, 25 yards, 1:33.**
- KC – Todd Peterson 34-yard field goal, 9:09. Chiefs 10–0. **Drive: 5 plays, 33 yards, 2:03.**
- KC – Todd Peterson 20-yard field goal, 4:33. Chiefs 13–0. **Drive: 5 plays, 33 yards, 1:41.**
- KC – Mike Cloud 6-yard return of blocked punt (Todd Peterson kick), 2:56. Chiefs 20–0.

**Second quarter**

- STL – Marshall Faulk 1-yard run (Pete Stoyanovich kick), 9:43. Chiefs 20–7. **Drive: 14 plays, 80 yards, 8:13.**
- KC – Tony Gonzalez 9-yard pass from Elvis Grbac (Todd Peterson kick), 6:49. Chiefs 27–7. **Drive: 5 plays, 71 yards, 2:54.**
- STL – Torry Holt 18-yard pass from Kurt Warner (Pete Stoyanovich kick), 5:15. Chiefs 27–14. **Drive: 3 plays, 52 yards, 1:34.**

**Third quarter**

- KC – Derrick Alexander 30-yard pass from Elvis Grbac (Todd Peterson kick), 13:30. Chiefs 34–14. **Drive: 3 plays, 65 yards, 1:30.**
- STL – Roland Williams 31-yard pass from Trent Green (Pete Stoyanovich kick), 8:50. Chiefs 34–21. **Drive: 8 plays, 87 yards, 4:40.**
- KC – Kimble Anders 6-yard run (pass failed), 1:26. Chiefs 40–21. **Drive: 6 plays, 52 yards, 1:29.**
- STL – Isaac Bruce 22-yard pass from Trent Green (Pete Stoyanovich kick), 0:18. Chiefs 40–28. **Drive: 3 plays, 34 yards, 1:08.**

**Fourth quarter**

- KC – Kimble Anders 4-yard run (Todd Peterson kick), 10:51. Chiefs 47–28. **Drive: 5 plays, 77 yards, 2:47.**
- KC – Troy Drayton 8-yard pass from Warren Moon (Todd Peterson kick), 5:27. Chiefs 54–28. **Drive: 5 plays, 80 yards, 2:03.**
- STL – Isaac Bruce 4-yard pass from Trent Green (pass failed), 2:53. Chiefs 54–34. **Drive: 7 plays, 51 yards, 2:34.**

**Top passers**

- STL – Trent Green – 15/25, 185 yards, 3 TD, INT
- KC – Elvis Grbac – 15/21, 205 yards, 2 TD

**Top rushers**

- STL – Marshall Faulk – 17 rushes, 67 yards, TD
- KC – Kimble Anders – 13 rushes, 102 yards, 2 TD

**Top receivers**

- STL – Isaac Bruce – 8 receptions, 129 yards, 2 TD
- KC – Derrick Alexander – 5 receptions, 117 yards, TD

==== Week 9: at Seattle Seahawks ====
Week 9: Kansas City Chiefs at Seattle Seahawks – Game summary

Quarter	1	2	3	4	Total
**Chiefs**	7	14	0	3	**24**
Seahawks	3	7	0	9	**19**

at Husky Stadium, Seattle, Washington

- Date: October 29
- Game time: 3:15 p.m. CST/1:15 p.m. PST
- Game weather: Mostly sunny, 52 °F (11 °C)
- Game attendance: 62,141
- Referee: Ron Blum
- TV announcers (CBS): Kevin Harlan, Daryl Johnston and Beasley Reece
- Recap, Game Book

Game information

**First quarter**

- SEA – Rian Lindell 50-yard field goal, 2:23. Seahawks 3–0. **Drive: 5 plays, 15 yards, 2:58.**
- KC – Derrick Alexander 59-yard pass from Elvis Grbac (Todd Peterson kick), 0:53. Chiefs 7–3. **Drive: 4 plays, 85 yards, 1:30.**

**Second quarter**

- SEA – Christian Fauria 2-yard pass from Jon Kitna (Rian Lindell kick), 8:30. Seahawks 10–7. **Drive: 6 plays, 40 yards, 2:55.**
- KC – Derrick Alexander 50-yard pass from Elvis Grbac (Todd Peterson kick), 5:54. Chiefs 14–10. **Drive: 6 plays, 76 yards, 3:26.**
- KC – Kevin Lockett 34-yard pass from Elvis Grbac (Todd Peterson kick), 2:20. Chiefs 21–10. **Drive: 4 plays, 54 yards, 1:48.**

**Third quarter**

- No scoring plays.

**Fourth quarter**

- SEA – Rian Lindell 24-yard field goal, 14:57. Chiefs 21–13. **Drive: 9 plays, 70 yards, 4:31.**
- SEA – Ricky Watters 14-yard pass from Jon Kitna (pass failed), 5:53. Chiefs 21–19. **Drive: 3 plays, 26 yards, 1:07.**
- KC – Todd Peterson 37-yard field goal, 0:42. Chiefs 24–19. **Drive: 5 plays, 17 yards, 1:06.**

**Top passers**

- KC – Elvis Grbac – 22/35, 342 yards, 3 TD, 3 INT
- SEA – Jon Kitna – 26/42, 224 yards, TD, 3 INT

**Top rushers**

- KC – Kimble Anders – 19 rushes, 54 yards
- SEA – Ricky Watters – 21 rushes, 90 yards

**Top receivers**

- KC – Derrick Alexander – 4 receptions, 137 yards, 2 TD
- SEA – Sean Dawkins – 7 receptions, 64 yards

==== Week 10: at Oakland Raiders ====
Week 10: Kansas City Chiefs at Oakland Raiders – Game summary

Quarter	1	2	3	4	Total
Chiefs	0	10	7	14	**31**
**Raiders**	14	14	7	14	**49**

at Network Associates Coliseum, Oakland, California

- Date: November 5
- Game time: 3:15 p.m. CST/1:15 p.m. PST
- Game weather: Mostly cloudy, 66 °F (19 °C)
- Game attendance: 62,428
- Referee: Ron Winter
- TV announcers (CBS): Kevin Harlan, Daryl Johnston and Beasley Reece
- Recap, Game Book

Game information

**First quarter**

- OAK – Andre Rison 10-yard pass from Rich Gannon (Shane Lechler kick), 9:37. Raiders 7–0. **Drive: 8 plays, 80 yards, 3:55.**
- OAK – Zack Crockett 1-yard run (Shane Lechler kick), 1:03. Raiders 14–0. **Drive: 12 plays, 72 yards, 6:43.**

**Second quarter**

- KC – Tony Richardson 1-yard run (Todd Peterson kick), 13:47. Raiders 14–7. **Drive: 5 plays, 60 yards, 2:16.**
- OAK – Andre Rison 6-yard pass from Rich Gannon (Shane Lechler kick), 7:40. Raiders 21–7. **Drive: 11 plays, 71 yards, 6:07.**
- OAK – Tyrone Wheatley 1-yard run (Shane Lechler kick), 3:21. Raiders 28–7. **Drive: 3 plays, 58 yards, 1:17.**
- KC – Todd Peterson 28-yard field goal, 0:27. Raiders 28–10. **Drive: 12 plays, 62 yards, 2:54.**

**Third quarter**

- OAK – Rickey Dudley 20-yard pass from Rich Gannon (Shane Lechler kick), 4:49. Raiders 35–10. **Drive: 8 plays, 67 yards, 4:51.**
- KC – Derrick Alexander 9-yard pass from Elvis Grbac (Todd Peterson kick), 1:07. Raiders 35–17. **Drive: 9 plays, 55 yards, 3:42.**

**Fourth quarter**

- KC – Derrick Alexander 48-yard pass from Elvis Grbac (Todd Peterson kick), 8:19. Raiders 35–24. **Drive: 4 plays, 77 yards, 0:51.**
- OAK – Rickey Dudley 2-yard pass from Rich Gannon (Shane Lechler kick), 3:53. Raiders 42–24. **Drive: 8 plays, 53 yards, 4:26.**
- KC – Elvis Grbac 3-yard run (Todd Peterson kick), 1:47. Raiders 42–31. **Drive: 10 plays, 72 yards, 2:06.**
- OAK – Randy Jordan 43-yard run (Shane Lechler kick), 1:37. Raiders 49–31. **Drive: 1 play, 43 yards, 0:10.**

**Top passers**

- KC – Elvis Grbac – 39/53, 504 yards, 2 TD, 2 INT
- OAK – Rich Gannon – 20/31, 242 yards, 4 TD

**Top rushers**

- KC – Kimble Anders – 2 rushes, 20 yards
- OAK – Tyrone Wheatley – 20 rushes, 112 yards, TD

**Top receivers**

- KC – Derrick Alexander – 9 receptions, 139 yards, 2 TD
- OAK – Tim Brown – 5 receptions, 74 yards

Quarterback Elvis Grbac threw for 504 yards, setting the franchise record for most passing yards in a game.

==== Week 11: at San Francisco 49ers ====
Week 11: Kansas City Chiefs at San Francisco 49ers – Game summary

Quarter	1	2	3	4	Total
Chiefs	0	0	0	7	**7**
**49ers**	0	21	0	0	**21**

at 3Com Park, San Francisco, California

- Date: November 12
- Game time: 3:05 p.m. CST/1:05 p.m. PST
- Game weather: Sunny and clear, 54 °F (12 °C)
- Game attendance: 68,002
- Referee: Johnny Grier
- TV announcers (CBS): Greg Gumbel, Phil Simms and Armen Keteyian
- Recap, Game Book

Game information

**First quarter**

- No scoring plays.

**Second quarter**

- SF – Charlie Garner 1-yard run (Wade Richey kick), 14:16. 49ers 7–0. **Drive: 4 plays, 80 yards, 1:36.**
- SF – Jeff Garcia 2-yard run (Wade Richey kick), 6:44. 49ers 14–0. **Drive: 10 plays, 56 yards, 5:22.**
- SF – Jeff Garcia 1-yard run (Wade Richey kick), 0:23. 49ers 21–0. **Drive: 8 plays, 65 yards, 3:33.**

**Third quarter**

- No scoring plays.

**Fourth quarter**

- KC – Donnell Bennett 1-yard run (Todd Peterson kick), 6:27. 49ers 21–7. **Drive: 10 plays, 79 yards, 4:46.**

**Top passers**

- KC – Elvis Grbac – 22/40, 276 yards, INT
- SF – Jeff Garcia – 20/25, 244 yards

**Top rushers**

- KC – Kimble Anders – 3 rushes, 21 yards
- SF – Charlie Garner – 25 rushes, 102 yards, TD

**Top receivers**

- KC – Tony Richardson – 8 receptions, 81 yards
- SF – J. J. Stokes – 3 receptions, 66 yards

==== Week 12: vs. Buffalo Bills ====
Week 12: Buffalo Bills at Kansas City Chiefs – Game summary

Quarter	1	2	3	4	Total
**Bills**	7	0	0	14	**21**
Chiefs	0	3	7	7	**17**

at Arrowhead Stadium, Kansas City, Missouri

- Date: November 19
- Game time: 12:00 p.m. CST
- Game weather: Clear, 46 °F (8 °C)
- Game attendance: 78,457
- Referee: Dick Hantak
- TV announcers (CBS): Gus Johnson and Brent Jones
- Recap, Game Book

Game information

**First quarter**

- BUF – Eric Moulds 9-yard pass from Rob Johnson (Steve Christie kick), 9:59. Bills 7–0. **Drive: 10 plays, 71 yards, 5:01.**

**Second quarter**

- KC – Todd Peterson 19-yard field goal, 5:12. Bills 7–3. **Drive: 10 plays, 87 yards, 5:32.**

**Third quarter**

- KC – Tony Gonzalez 13-yard pass from Elvis Grbac (Todd Peterson kick), 9:07. Chiefs 10–7. **Drive: 7 plays, 71 yards, 3:29.**

**Fourth quarter**

- BUF – Jay Riemersma 18-yard pass from Rob Johnson (Steve Christie kick), 13:35. Bills 14–10. **Drive: 9 plays, 63 yards, 3:22.**
- KC – Tony Gonzalez 9-yard pass from Elvis Grbac (Todd Peterson kick), 7:55. Chiefs 17–14. **Drive: 13 plays, 63 yards, 5:40.**
- BUF – Rob Johnson 12-yard run (Steve Christie kick), 2:58. Bills 21–17. **Drive: 11 plays, 67 yards, 4:57.**

**Top passers**

- BUF – Rob Johnson – 21/36, 196 yards, 2 TD
- KC – Elvis Grbac – 28/48, 341 yards, 2 TD, INT

**Top rushers**

- BUF – Rob Johnson – 4 rushes, 42 yards, TD
- KC – Tony Richardson – 8 rushes, 44 yards

**Top receivers**

- BUF – Eric Moulds – 8 receptions, 67 yards, TD
- KC – Derrick Alexander – 7 receptions, 146 yards

==== Week 13: at San Diego Chargers ====
Week 13: Kansas City Chiefs at San Diego Chargers – Game summary

Quarter	1	2	3	4	Total
Chiefs	3	3	10	0	**16**
**Chargers**	7	7	0	3	**17**

at Qualcomm Stadium, San Diego, California

- Date: November 26
- Game time: 3:15 p.m. CST/1:15 p.m. PST
- Game weather: Clear and sunny, 69 °F (21 °C)
- Game attendance: 47,228
- Referee: Bernie Kukar
- TV announcers (CBS): Ian Eagle and Mark May
- Recap, Game Book

Game information

**First quarter**

- KC – Todd Peterson 39-yard field goal, 6:34. Chiefs 3–0. **Drive: 4 plays, 2 yards, 0:36.**
- SD – Freddie Jones 20-yard pass from Ryan Leaf (John Carney kick), 4:23. Chargers 7–3. **Drive: 5 plays, 68 yards, 2:11.**

**Second quarter**

- SD – Freddie Jones 7-yard pass from Ryan Leaf (John Carney kick), 13:12. Chargers 14–3. **Drive: 8 plays, 80 yards, 4:40.**
- KC – Todd Peterson 34-yard field goal, 4:32. Chargers 14–6. **Drive: 7 plays, 8 yards, 3:32.**

**Third quarter**

- KC – Marvcus Patton 24-yard interception return (Todd Peterson kick), 13:58. Chargers 14–13.
- KC – Todd Peterson 30-yard field goal, 1:51. Chiefs 16–14. **Drive: 6 plays, 39 yards, 2:40.**

**Fourth quarter**

- KC – John Carney 52-yard field goal, 2:14. Chargers 17–16. **Drive: 4 plays, 3 yards, 1:24.**

**Top passers**

- KC – Warren Moon – 12/31, 130 yards, INT
- SD – Ryan Leaf – 17/30, 177 yards, 2 TD, 2 INT

**Top rushers**

- KC – Tony Richardson – 9 rushes, 52 yards
- SD – Terrell Fletcher – 14 rushes, 40 yards

**Top receivers**

- KC – Derrick Alexander – 4 receptions, 67 yards
- SD – Jeff Graham – 3 receptions, 48 yards

The loss dropped the Chiefs to 5–7. Additionally, this would be the only game the Chargers would win all season. The Chiefs failed to score an offensive touchdown, with the team's only touchdown coming on a Marvcus Patton pick six in the third quarter.

==== Week 14: at New England Patriots ====
Week 14: Kansas City Chiefs at New England Patriots – Game summary

Quarter	1	2	3	4	Total
Chiefs	3	7	0	14	**24**
**Patriots**	10	10	7	3	**30**

at Foxboro Stadium, Foxborough, Massachusetts

- Date: December 4
- Game time: 9:00 p.m. EST/8:00 p.m. CST
- Game weather: Clear and cold, 45 °F (7 °C)
- Game attendance: 60,292
- Referee: Bob McElwee
- TV announcers (ABC): Al Michaels, Dan Fouts, Dennis Miller, Melissa Stark and Eric Dickerson
- Recap, Game Book

Game information

**First quarter**

- NE – Adam Vinatieri 48-yard field goal, 12:18. Patriots 3–0. **Drive: 6 plays, 17 yards, 2:42.**
- KC – Todd Peterson 42-yard field goal, 8:27. Tied 3–3. **Drive: 9 plays, 45 yards, 3:51.**
- NE – Kevin Faulk 1-yard run (Adam Vinatieri kick), 1:29. Patriots 10–3. **Drive: 15 plays, 67 yards, 6:58.**

**Second quarter**

- KC – Derrick Alexander 81-yard pass from Elvis Grbac (Todd Peterson kick), 8:29. Tied 10–10. **Drive: 1 play, 81 yards, 0:10.**
- NE – Troy Brown 17-yard pass from Drew Bledsoe (Adam Vinatieri kick), 2:00. Patriots 17–10. **Drive: 5 plays, 32 yards, 0:36.**
- NE – Adam Vinatieri 53-yard field goal, 0:00. Patriots 20–10. **Drive: 6 plays, 41 yards, 1:01.**

**Third quarter**

- NE – Jermaine Wiggins 1-yard pass from Drew Bledsoe (Adam Vinatieri kick), 7:09. Patriots 27–10. **Drive: 8 plays, 63 yards, 3:42.**

**Fourth quarter**

- KC – Tony Gonzalez 4-yard pass from Elvis Grbac (Todd Peterson kick), 13:43. Patriots 27–17. **Drive: 12 plays, 73 yards, 4:20.**
- NE – Adam Vinatieri 27-yard field goal, 7:23. Patriots 30–17. **Drive: 4 plays, 2 yards, 1:30.**
- KC – Kevin Lockett 19-yard pass from Elvis Grbac (Todd Peterson kick), 3:58. Patriots 30–24. **Drive: 2 plays, 44 yards, 0:28.**

**Top passers**

- KC – Elvis Grbac – 25/46, 350 yards, 3 TD, INT
- NE – Drew Bledsoe – 33/48, 282 yards, 2 TD

**Top rushers**

- KC – Tony Richardson – 6 rushes, 30 yards
- NE – Kevin Faulk – 22 rushes, 52 yards, TD

**Top receivers**

- KC – Tony Gonzalez – 11 receptions, 147 yards, TD
- NE – Troy Brown – 12 receptions, 119 yards, TD

==== Week 15: vs. Carolina Panthers ====
Week 15: Carolina Panthers at Kansas City Chiefs – Game summary

Quarter	1	2	3	4	Total
Panthers	0	7	7	0	**14**
**Chiefs**	0	3	3	9	**15**

at Arrowhead Stadium, Kansas City, Missouri

- Date: December 10
- Game time: 12:00 p.m. CST
- Game weather: Overcast, 30 °F (−1 °C)
- Game attendance: 77,481
- Referee: Gerry Austin
- TV announcers (Fox): Curt Menefee, Brian Baldinger and Jim Hayes
- Recap, Game Book

Game information

**First quarter**

- No scoring plays.

**Second quarter**

- CAR – Chris Hetherington 1-yard run (Joe Nedney kick), 4:00. Panthers 7–0. **Drive: 8 plays, 68 yards, 3:46.**
- KC – Todd Peterson 35-yard field goal, 1:33. Panthers 7–3. **Drive: 8 plays, 51 yards, 2:27.**

**Third quarter**

- CAR – Kris Mangum 15-yard pass from Steve Beuerlein (Joe Nedney kick), 9:32. Panthers 14–3. **Drive: 10 plays, 73 yards, 5:28.**
- KC – Todd Peterson 24-yard field goal, 3:46. Panthers 14–6. **Drive: 14 plays, 69 yards, 5:46.**

**Fourth quarter**

- KC – Tony Gonzalez 6-yard pass from Elvis Grbac (pass failed), 12:31. Panthers 14–12. **Drive: 12 plays, 85 yards, 4:52.**
- KC – Todd Peterson 33-yard field goal, 3:43. Chiefs 15–14. **Drive: 8 plays, 43 yards, 3:28.**

**Top passers**

- CAR – Steve Beuerlein – 23/31, 252 yards, TD, INT
- KC – Elvis Grbac – 31/44, 315 yards, TD, 2 INT

**Top rushers**

- CAR – Brad Hoover – 10 rushes, 13 yards
- KC – Tony Richardson – 17 rushes, 89 yards

**Top receivers**

- CAR – Muhsin Muhammad – 8 receptions, 102 yards
- KC – Tony Gonzalez – 10 receptions, 96 yards, TD

==== Week 16: vs. Denver Broncos ====
Week 16: Denver Broncos at Kansas City Chiefs – Game summary

Quarter	1	2	3	4	Total
Broncos	0	7	0	0	**7**
**Chiefs**	3	0	7	10	**20**

at Arrowhead Stadium, Kansas City, Missouri

- Date: December 17
- Game time: 12:00 p.m. CST
- Game weather: Clear, 9 °F (−13 °C)
- Game attendance: 78,406
- Referee: Ron Winter
- TV announcers (CBS): Kevin Harlan, Daryl Johnston and Beasley Reece
- Recap, Game Book

Game information

**First quarter**

- KC – Todd Peterson 40-yard field goal, 7:29. Chiefs 3–0. **Drive: 12 plays, 73 yards, 5:52.**

**Second quarter**

- DEN – Jason Suttle fumble recovery in end zone (Jason Elam kick), 11:26. Broncos 7–3.

**Third quarter**

- KC – Frank Moreau 2-yard run (Todd Peterson kick), 9:23. Chiefs 10–7. **Drive: 6 plays, 70 yards, 3:23.**

**Fourth quarter**

- KC – Tony Richardson 28-yard run (Todd Peterson kick), 7:14. Chiefs 17–7. **Drive: 8 plays, 73 yards, 4:24.**
- KC – Todd Peterson 27-yard field goal, 0:33. Chiefs 20–7. **Drive: 10 plays, 42 yards, 5:01.**

**Top passers**

- DEN – Gus Frerotte – 22/34, 234 yards
- KC – Elvis Grbac – 14/28, 160 yards

**Top rushers**

- DEN – Mike Anderson – 12 rushes, 62 yards
- KC – Tony Richardson – 23 rushes, 156 yards, TD

**Top receivers**

- DEN – Rod Smith – 6 receptions, 101 yards
- KC – Derrick Alexander – 5 receptions, 79 yards

==== Week 17: at Atlanta Falcons ====
Week 17: Kansas City Chiefs at Atlanta Falcons – Game summary

Quarter	1	2	3	4	Total
Chiefs	7	0	0	6	**13**
**Falcons**	7	6	6	10	**29**

at Georgia Dome, Atlanta, Georgia

- Date: December 24
- Game time: 1:00 p.m. EST/12:00 p.m. CST
- Game weather: None (indoor stadium)
- Game attendance: 41,017
- Referee: Larry Nemmers
- TV announcers (CBS): Ian Eagle and Mark May
- Recap, Game Book

Game information

**First quarter**

- ATL – Shawn Jefferson 17-yard pass from Chris Chandler (Morten Andersen kick), 6:48. Falcons 7–0. **Drive: 15 plays, 75 yards, 8:12.**
- KC – Tony Gonzalez 21-yard pass from Elvis Grbac (Todd Peterson kick), 0:19. Tied 7–7. **Drive: 4 plays, 48 yards, 2:02.**

**Second quarter**

- ATL – Morten Andersen 24-yard field goal, 6:38. Falcons 10–7. **Drive: 13 plays, 58 yards, 8:41.**
- ATL – Morten Andersen 48-yard field goal, 2:40. Falcons 13–7. **Drive: 7 plays, 26 yards, 2:19.**

**Third quarter**

- ATL – Morten Andersen 42-yard field goal, 4:41. Falcons 16–7. **Drive: 11 plays, 37 yards, 9:04.**
- ATL – Morten Andersen 23-yard field goal, 0:14. Falcons 19–7. **Drive: 6 plays, 30 yards, 2:25.**

**Fourth quarter**

- ATL – Brian Kozlowski 6-yard pass from Chris Chandler (Morten Andersen kick), 6:56. Falcons 26–7. **Drive: 2 plays, 8 yards, 0:49.**
- ATL – Morten Andersen 36-yard field goal, 1:56. Falcons 29–7. **Drive: 7 plays, 23 yards, 2:46.**
- KC – Frank Moreau 2-yard run (pass failed), 0:10. Falcons 29–13. **Drive: 9 plays, 78 yards, 1:46.**

**Top passers**

- KC – Elvis Grbac – 18/32, 230 yards, TD
- ATL – Chris Chandler – 20/29, 163 yards, 2 TD

**Top rushers**

- KC – Tony Richardson – 8 rushes, 30 yards
- ATL – Jamal Anderson – 28 rushes, 107 yards

**Top receivers**

- KC – Tony Gonzalez – 5 receptions, 86 yards, TD
- ATL – Shawn Jefferson – 3 receptions, 37 yards, TD

=== Standings ===
AFC West
	W	L	T	PCT	PF	PA	STK
^{(2)} Oakland Raiders	12	4	0	.750	479	299	W1
^{(5)} Denver Broncos	11	5	0	.688	485	369	W1
Kansas City Chiefs	7	9	0	.438	355	354	L1
Seattle Seahawks	6	10	0	.375	320	405	L1
San Diego Chargers	1	15	0	.063	269	440	L4
