= 2000 Denver Broncos season =

American football team season

- Owner: Pat Bowlen
- General manager: Neal Dahlen and Mike Shanahan
- President: Pat Bowlen
- Head coach: Mike Shanahan
- Offensive coordinator: Gary Kubiak
- Defensive coordinator: Greg Robinson
- Home stadium: Mile High Stadium

Results
- Record: 11–5
- Division place: 2nd AFC West
- Playoffs: Lost Wild Card Playoffs (at Ravens) 3–21
- Pro Bowlers: QB Brian Griese; WR Rod Smith; C Tom Nalen; DT Trevor Pryce

The 2000 season was the Denver Broncos' 31st in the National Football League (NFL) and their 41st overall. It also was the team's final year at Mile High Stadium.

The Broncos rebounded from their previous output, winning 11 games and finished 2nd in the AFC West. Denver's season ended with a 21–3 defeat to the Baltimore Ravens in the Wildcard round. With running back Terrell Davis still struggling with injuries, Denver turned to rookie Mike Anderson, who had a successful rookie campaign and was named Offensive Rookie of the Year following the season.

== Offseason ==
=== NFL draft ===
2000 Denver Broncos draft
Round	Pick	Player	Position	College	Notes
1	15	Deltha O'Neal *	Cornerback	California	from Baltimore (Note: No. 15: Baltimore → Denver (PD). see No. 15: Baltimore → Denver.)
2	40	Ian Gold *	Linebacker	Michigan	
2	45	Kenoy Kennedy	Safety	Arkansas	from Baltimore
3	70	Chris Cole	Wide receiver	Texas A&M	
4	101	Jerry Johnson	Defensive tackle	Florida State	
4	112	Cooper Carlisle	Guard	Florida	from Carolina
5	154	Muneer Moore	Wide receiver	Richmond	from San Francisco via Seattle
6	189	Mike Anderson	Running back	Utah	from St. Louis
7	214	Jarious Jackson	Quarterback	Notre Dame	
7	246	Leroy Fields	Wide receiver	Jackson State	
Made roster † Pro Football Hall of Fame * Made at least one Pro Bowl during career

=== Undrafted free agents ===
2000 undrafted free agents of note
Player	Position	College
Darius Clark	Safety	Duke

== Staff ==
2000 Denver Broncos staff
Front office: President and chief executive officer – Pat Bowlen; General manager – Neal Dahlen; Head coaches: Head coach/vice president of football operations – Mike Shanahan; Assistant head coach/offensive line – Alex Gibbs; Offensive coaches: Offensive coordinator/quarterbacks – Gary Kubiak; Running backs – Bobby Turner; Wide receivers – Karl Dorrell; Tight ends – Brian Pariani; Offensive assistant – Pat McPherson	Defensive coaches: Defensive coordinator – Greg Robinson; Defensive line – George Dyer; Linebackers – Larry Coyer; Defensive backs – Ron Milus; Nickel package/secondary – Frank Bush; Defensive assistant – Terry Tumey; Pass rush specialist – John Teerlinck; Special teams coaches: Special teams – Rick Dennison; Special teams assistant – Anthony Lynn; Strength and conditioning: Strength and conditioning – Rich Tuten; Assistant strength and conditioning – Greg Saporta

== Roster ==
2000 Denver Broncos roster
Quarterbacks (QB): 12 Gus Frerotte; 14 Brian Griese; 17 Jarious Jackson; Running backs (RB): 38 Mike Anderson; 46 KaRon Coleman; 30 Terrell Davis; 29 Howard Griffith FB; 42 Detron Smith FB; Wide receivers (WR): 84 Chris Cole; 85 Chafie Fields; 87 Ed McCaffrey; 83 Travis McGriff; 81 Scottie Montgomery; 80 Rod Smith; Tight ends (TE): 89 Dwayne Carswell; 86 Byron Chamberlain; 88 Desmond Clark; 82 Billy Miller	Offensive linemen (OL): 65 Cooper Carlisle G; 64 Lennie Friedman G; 60 K. C. Jones C; 77 Tony Jones T; 78 Matt Lepsis T; 66 Tom Nalen C; 62 Dan Neil G; Defensive linemen (DL): 92 Lester Archambeau DE; 96 Harald Hasselbach DE; 90 Jerry Johnson DT; 97 Mike Lodish DT; 95 Kavika Pittman DE; 93 Trevor Pryce DT; 99 Montae Reagor DT; 98 Maa Tanuvasa DE; 94 Keith Traylor NT	Linebackers (LB): 55 Keith Burns MLB; 59 Glenn Cadrez MLB; 52 Ian Gold OLB; 51 John Mobley OLB; 53 Bill Romanowski OLB; 56 Al Wilson MLB; Defensive backs (DB): 26 Eric Brown FS; 27 Terrell Buckley CB; 47 Darius Clark SS; 48 George Coghill FS; 39 Ray Crockett CB; 32 Billy Jenkins SS; 28 Kenoy Kennedy SS; 24 Deltha O'Neal CB; 33 Jimmy Spencer CB; 35 Jason Suttle CB; Special teams (ST): 1 Jason Elam K; 2 Steve Lindsey K; 16 Tom Rouen P	Practice squad: 43 DeAuntae Brown CB; 21 Keith Brown RB; 74 John Feugill T; 79 Steve Herndon G; 75 Donnie Young G; Reserve: 73 Cyron Brown DE (Susp.); 40 Dale Carter CB (Susp.); -- Chris Doering WR (IR); 22 Olandis Gary RB (IR); 45 Chris Jones LB (NF-Inj.); 19 Muneer Moore WR (IR); 31 Darryl Pounds CB (IR); 69 Mark Schlereth G (IR); 70 Trey Teague LS (IR); Rookies in italics 53 active, 9 reserve, 5 practice squad

== Preseason ==
Week	Date	Opponent	Result	Record	Venue
1	August 5	at Arizona Cardinals	W 31–17	1–0	Sun Devil Stadium
2	August 13	Green Bay Packers	W 26–20	2–0	Mile High Stadium
3	August 19	Dallas Cowboys	W 36–23	3–0	Mile High Stadium
4	August 25	at San Francisco 49ers	W 28–24	4–0	3Com Park

== Regular season ==
=== Schedule ===
Week	Date	Opponent	Result	Record	Venue	Attendance
1	September 4	at St. Louis Rams	**L** 36–41	0–1	Trans World Dome	65,956
2	September 10	Atlanta Falcons	**W** 42–14	1–1	Mile High Stadium	75,466
3	September 17	at **Oakland Raiders**	**W** 33–24	2–1	Network Associates Coliseum	62,078
4	September 24	**Kansas City Chiefs**	**L** 22–23	2–2	Mile High Stadium	74,596
5	October 1	New England Patriots	**L** 19–28	2–3	Mile High Stadium	75,684
6	October 8	at **San Diego Chargers**	**W** 21–7	3–3	Qualcomm Stadium	56,079
7	October 15	Cleveland Browns	**W** 44–10	4–3	Mile High Stadium	75,811
8	October 22	at Cincinnati Bengals	**L** 21–31	4–4	Paul Brown Stadium	61,603
9	Bye					
10	November 5	at New York Jets	**W** 30–23	5–4	Giants Stadium	78,305
11	November 13	**Oakland Raiders**	**W** 27–24	6–4	Mile High Stadium	75,951
12	November 19	**San Diego Chargers**	**W** 38–37	7–4	Mile High Stadium	75,218
13	November 26	at **Seattle Seahawks**	**W** 38–31	8–4	Husky Stadium	68,661
14	December 3	at New Orleans Saints	**W** 38–23	9–4	Louisiana Superdome	64,900
15	December 10	**Seattle Seahawks**	**W** 31–24	10–4	Mile High Stadium	75,218
16	December 17	at **Kansas City Chiefs**	**L** 7–20	10–5	Arrowhead Stadium	78,406
17	December 23	San Francisco 49ers	**W** 38–9	11–5	Mile High Stadium	76,098
Note: Intra-division opponents are in **bold** text.

== Standings ==
AFC West
	W	L	T	PCT	PF	PA	STK
^{(2)} Oakland Raiders	12	4	0	.750	479	299	W1
^{(5)} Denver Broncos	11	5	0	.688	485	369	W1
Kansas City Chiefs	7	9	0	.438	355	354	L1
Seattle Seahawks	6	10	0	.375	320	405	L1
San Diego Chargers	1	15	0	.063	269	440	L4

== Postseason ==
Playoff round	Date	Opponent	Result	Record	Game site	Game recap
Wild Card	December 31	at Baltimore Ravens (4)	L 3–21	0–1	PSINet Stadium	Recap

== Awards and records ==
- Mike Anderson, franchise record, most rushing yards in one game, 251 yards (December 3, 2000)
- Mike Anderson, NFL record, most rushing yards in one game for a rookie, 251 yards (December 3, 2000)
- Gus Frerotte, franchise record, most passing yards in one game, 462 yards (November 19, 2000)
- Ed McCaffrey, franchise record, most receptions in one season, 101 receptions
- Trevor Pryce, AFC Pro Bowl selection,
- Rod Smith, AFC Pro Bowl selection,
- Rod Smith, franchise record, most receiving yards in one season, 1,602 receiving yards-

=== Milestones ===
QB Brian Griese named to the Pro Bowl.
