= Fullback (gridiron football) =

Position in American or Canadian football

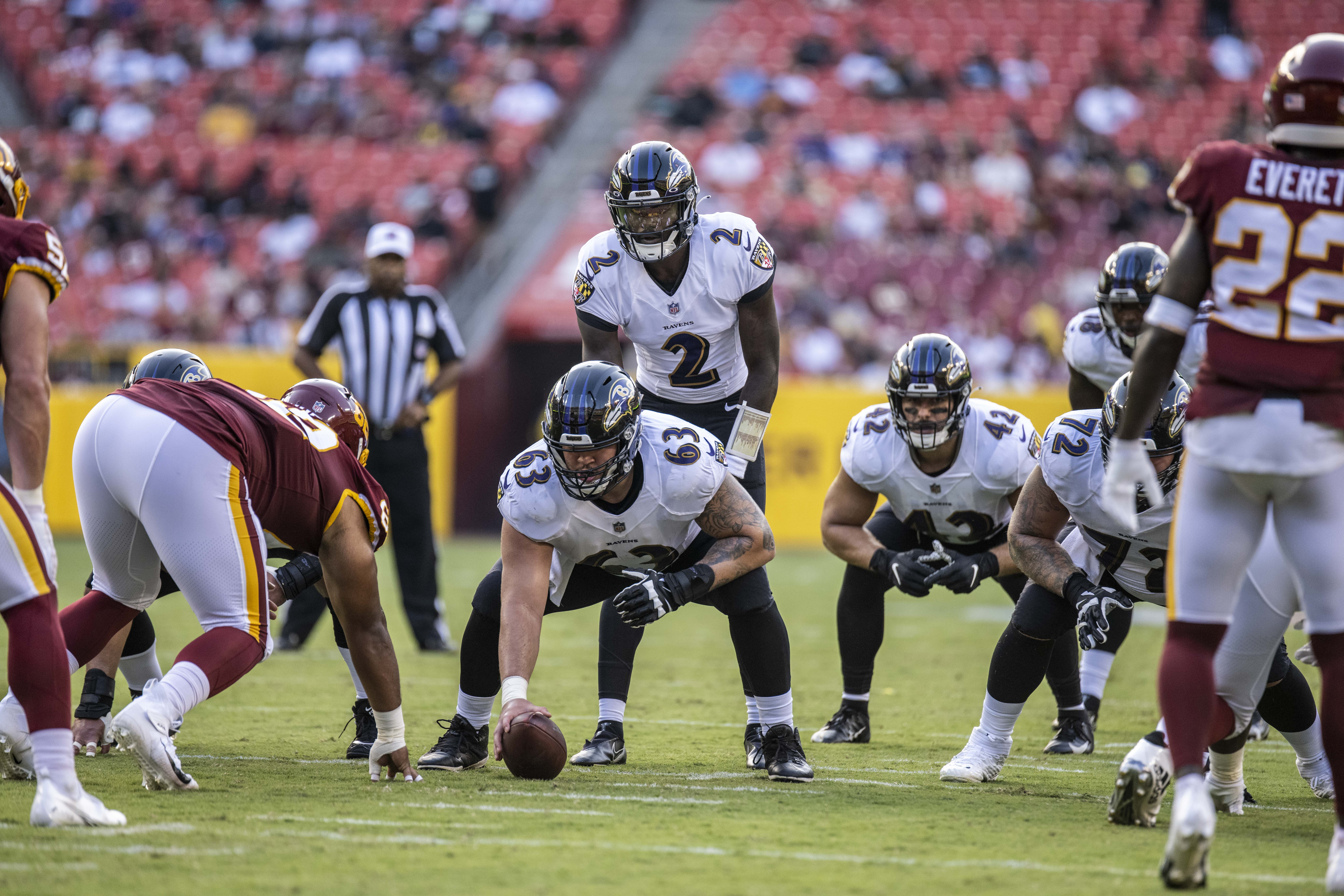
Baltimore Ravens fullback Patrick Ricard (No. 42) lines up behind quarterback Tyler Huntley during a 2021 preseason game.

A fullback (FB) is a position in the offensive backfield in gridiron football and is one of the two running back positions along with the halfback. Fullbacks are typically larger than halfbacks, and, in most offensive schemes, the fullback's duties are split among power running, pass catching, and blocking for both the quarterback and the other running back.

Many great runners in the history of American football have been fullbacks, including Jim Brown, Marion Motley, Bronko Nagurski, Jim Taylor, Franco Harris, Larry Csonka, Tom Rathman, John Riggins, Christian Okoye, and Levi Jackson. However, many of these runners would retroactively be labeled as halfbacks, due to their position as the primary ball carrier. They were mainly listed as fullbacks because of their size and did not typically perform the run blocking duties expected of modern fullbacks. Examples of players who have excelled at the hybrid running–blocking–pass catching role include Mike Alstott, Larry Centers, C. J. Ham, William Henderson, Daryl Johnston, Kyle Juszczyk, John Kuhn, Vonta Leach, Le'Ron McClain, Lorenzo Neal, Marcel Reece and Patrick Ricard.

A decline in the usage of fullbacks, particularly at the professional level, occurred during the late 2000s to mid 2010s. Moreover, the term fullback is increasingly used to refer to specifically running backs focused on blocking, much like how the original quarterback is the blocking back. This is likely due to teams beginning to focus more on passing, as well as the increased popularity of personnel groupings and formations which omit the position. As a result, the role of fullbacks as ball-carriers in the run game has decreased, and most fullbacks only run the ball in rare instances, generally in short-yardage situations. The position's decline was at its peak in the early 2010s, where many NFL teams began phasing the position out of their offenses entirely. However, after the 2017 NFL season, the position saw a gradual resurgence and evolution as teams began using the position again. By the early 2020s, most NFL teams had returned to using the position in some capacity in their offenses. Most NFL teams either carry a designated fullback, a hybrid player who plays fullback in addition to playing another position (usually tight end), or use a rotation of players at the position.

== History ==
Example of fullback positioning in the "I-Form" offense.

In the days before two platoons, the fullback was normally the team's punter and drop kicker. When, at the beginning of the 20th century, a penalty was introduced for hitting the opposing kicker after a kick, the foul was at first called "running into the fullback", inasmuch as the deepest back usually did the kicking.

Before the emergence of the T-formation in the 1940s, most teams used four offensive backs, lined up behind the offensive line, on every play: a quarterback, two halfbacks, and a fullback. The quarterback began each play a quarter of the way "back" behind the offensive line, the halfbacks began each play side by side and halfway "back" behind the offensive line, and the fullback began each play the furthest "back" behind the offensive line.

As the game evolved and alternate formations came in and went out of fashion, halfbacks (typically reduced to one rather than two) emerged as the offensive backs most likely to run the ball. "Halfback" came to be synonymous with "running back". Formations started to favor placing the fullback—the back most entrusted with blocking for the running back—closer to the line of scrimmage than the running back. These blocking backs retained the name "fullback" even though they were closer to the offensive line than the halfback. The term "halfback" declined in usage, replaced variously with the more descriptive term "tailback" or the generic term "running back". The term "fullback" is eventually used specifically for blocking backs.

Fullbacks in modern football are usually lined up behind the quarterback (directly behind in formations like the standard I-formation or offset to either side of the quarterback in formations like the strong I, where they line up on the side with the tight end, or in the weak I where they line up on the side of the formation without the tight end), but with the rise of shotgun and pistol formations, they sometimes line up next to or in front of the quarterbacks in these formations. When fullbacks are used in pistol formations, they are often lined up next to the quarterback on either side while the running back lines up directly behind the quarterback. In shotgun formations, they are sometimes placed closer to the offensive line if used as blockers or next to the quarterback where they line up parallel to the running back, who will line up parallel to the fullback on the other side of the quarterback either slightly in front or behind the quarterback.

== Characteristics ==
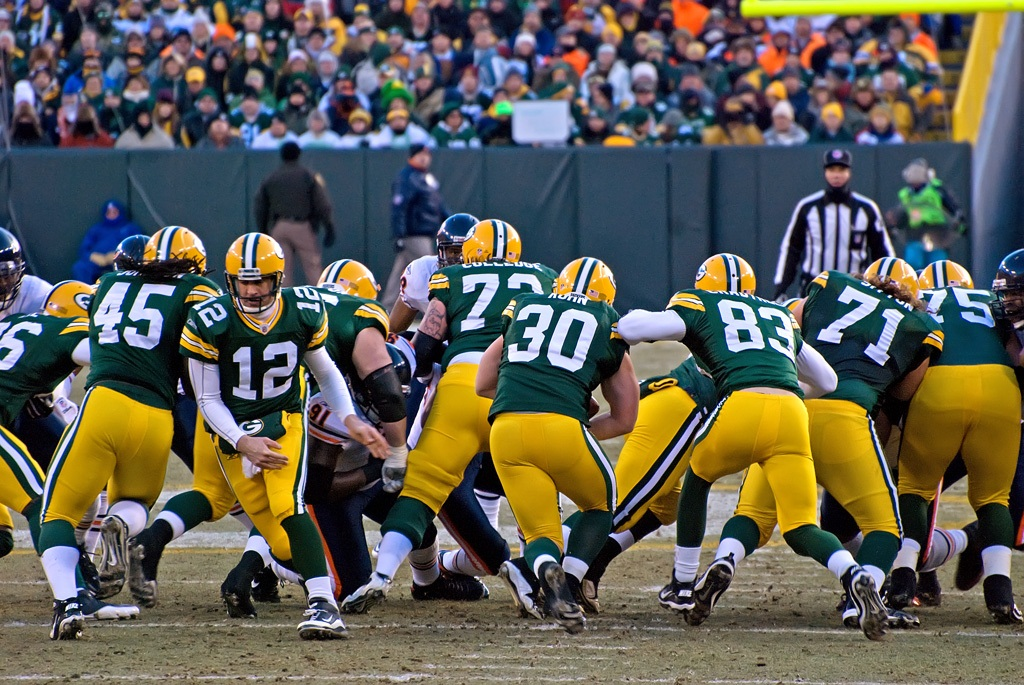
Green Bay Packers fullback John Kuhn (#30) carrying the football after receiving the hand-off from quarterback Aaron Rodgers (#12).

=== Runners ===
Fullbacks in the run game are historically more valued as power runners used for their ability to fight for yards as opposed to being fast backs valued for their elusiveness and ability to make explosive plays on the ground.

While rare, some fullbacks have been their teams leading rushers. Prominent examples include Le'Ron McClain who was the rushing leader for the 2008 Ravens with 902 yards. The 2000 Chiefs rushing leader was Tony Richardson with only 697 yards. In 2010, Peyton Hillis led the Cleveland Browns in rushing yards with 1,177 yards as a fullback.

In the contemporary NFL, the role of fullbacks as ball-carriers is extremely rare and most are limited to running the ball in select short-yardage situations.

=== Blocking ===
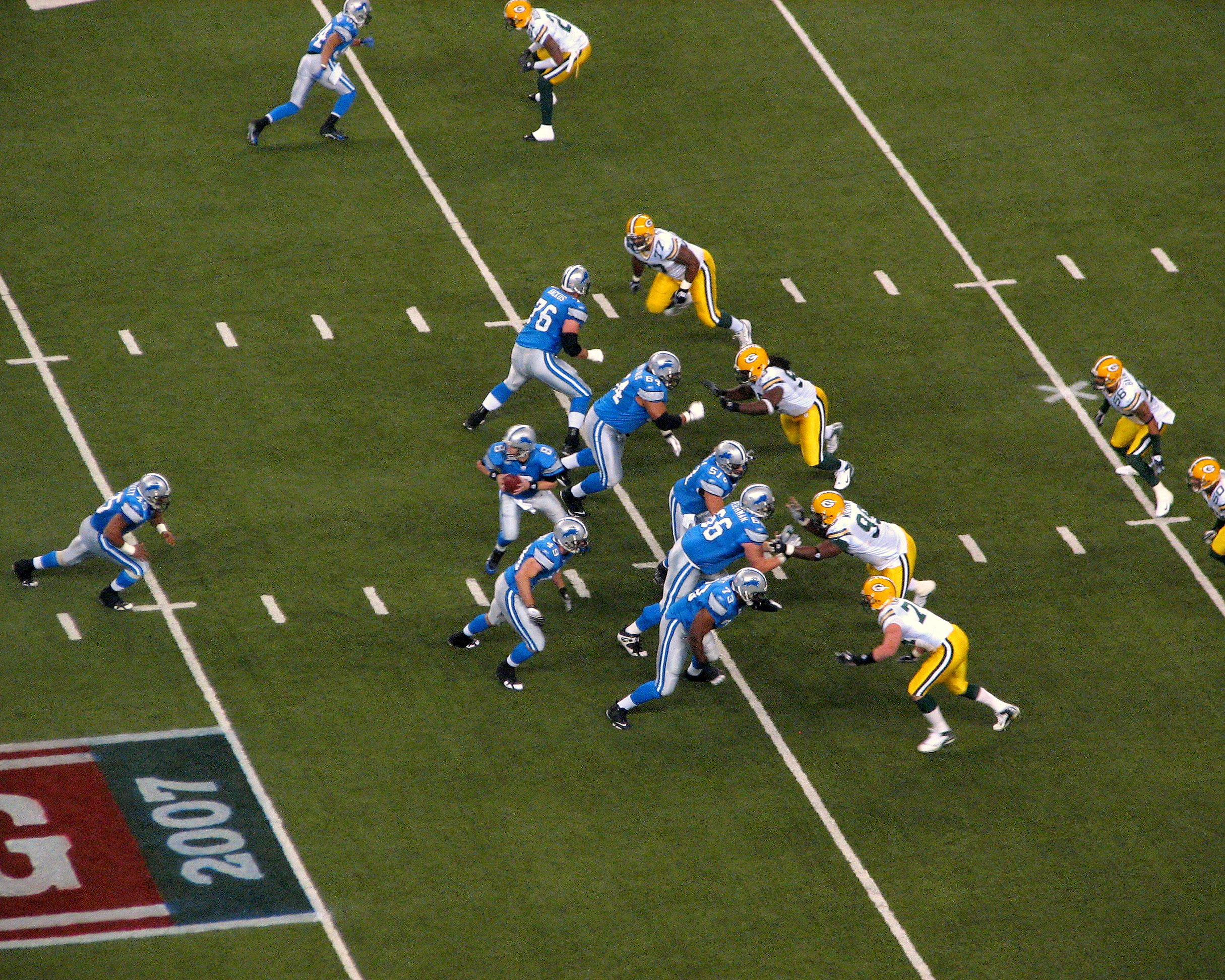
Running behind the fullback: Detroit Lions quarterback Jon Kitna (#8) is about to hand the football to halfback T. J. Duckett (#45), who will run behind the fullback Sean McHugh (#49).

Although technically running backs, a fullback's main responsibility, especially in modern football, is generally blocking. The most common and simple runs—the dive and the blast—both employ the fullback as the primary blocker for the halfback. In the flexbone formation, however, the fullback (sometimes referred to as the B-back) can often be used as the primary rushing threat.

In selected plays, some teams have had a lineman, either offensive or defensive, report as an eligible receiver to line up as a fullback. These packages are often referred to as "Jumbo" or "Heavy Jumbo", other times these linemen will report as eligible and line up as a tight end for similar purposes in packages like in the "Miami" package).

Some contemporary NFL teams have gone even further and have made hybrid or fully converted linemen into their primary fullbacks.

Some teams also use fullbacks for pass blocking.

=== Receivers ===
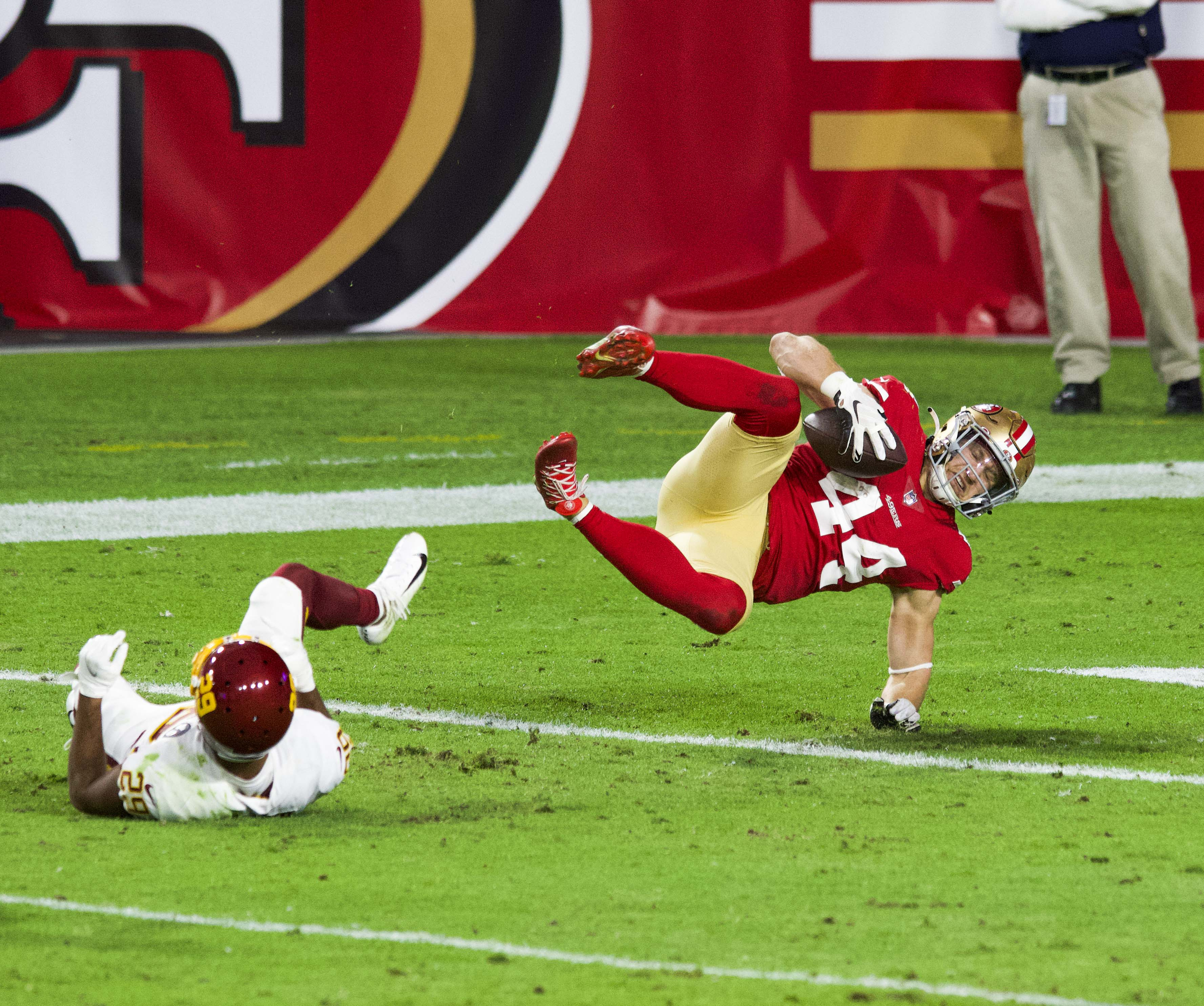
San Francisco 49ers fullback Kyle Juszczyk (#44) catching a touchdown.

As a skill position player, a fullback is an eligible receiver and can therefore be used on passing plays to catch the ball. Most contemporary fullbacks have roles as pass-catchers and in many modern offenses, a fullback's role as a pass catcher may even be more significant than their role as a ball carrier/runner. Fullback Larry Centers, who played from 1990 to 2003, holds the NFL record for most career receptions by a running back (halfback/fullback) with 827. Centers was the first fullback selected to the AP All-Pro Team in 1996, the year he caught a career-high seven touchdowns. Other examples of pass-catcher fullbacks are Kimble Anders and John Williams.

Fullbacks may switch to play tight end. A notable example is Todd Christensen, who played fullback for the BYU Cougars and his early years in the NFL, then switched to tight end when he signed with the Oakland Raiders in 1979. He later led the league in receptions twice in the 1983 and 1986 seasons. Keith Byars also played both fullback and tight end throughout his 13-year career.

=== Canadian football ===
The fullback position is also used in Canadian football.
