= Greg Wesley =

American football player (born 1978)

No. 25
- Position: Safety

Personal information
- Born: March 19, 1978 (age 48); Little Rock, Arkansas, U.S.
- Listed height: 6 ft 2 in (1.88 m)
- Listed weight: 206 lb (93 kg)

Career information
- High school: England (England, Arkansas)
- College: Arkansas–Pine Bluff (1996–1999)
- NFL draft: 2000: 3rd round, 85th overall pick

Career history
- Kansas City Chiefs (2000–2007); Oakland Raiders (2008)*
- * Offseason or practice squad member only

Awards and highlights
- PFWA All-Rookie Team (2000); Second-team All-SWAC (1998)

Career NFL statistics
- Total tackles: 592
- Sacks: 6
- Forced fumbles: 11
- Fumble recoveries: 4
- Interceptions: 29
- Stats at Pro Football Reference

Gregory Lashon Wesley (born March 19, 1978) is an American former professional football player who was a safety in the National Football League (NFL). He played college football at University of Arkansas at Pine Bluff and was selected by the Kansas City Chiefs in the third round of the 2000 NFL draft.

Wesley was also a member of the Oakland Raiders.

== College career ==
He played in 33 games (22 starts) during his collegiate career at the University of Arkansas-Pine Bluff, totaling 121 tackles, nine tackles for a loss, eight interceptions, a fumble recovery, a forced fumble and 21 passes defensed. Wesley was selected in the 2000 NFL draft by Kansas City in the 3rd round of the draft.

== Professional career ==
=== Kansas City Chiefs ===
Wesley played eight seasons for the Kansas City Chiefs after being drafted by the team in the third round of the 2000 NFL draft. During that time, he recorded 497 tackles (430 solo), six sacks, 56 defended passes, 11 forced fumbles and 29 interceptions (for 542 yards). In 2007, he lost his starting job with the Chiefs to safety Bernard Pollard.

On July 17, 2008, Wesley was released by the Chiefs.

=== Oakland Raiders ===
On July 22, 2008, Wesley signed with the Oakland Raiders, but was released on August 11, before appearing in any games.

=== NFL statistics ===
Year	Team	Games	Combined tackles	Tackles	Assisted tackles	Sacks	Forced fumbles	Fumble recoveries	Fumble return yards	Interceptions	Interception return yards	Yards per interception return	Longest interception return	Interceptions returned for touchdown	Passes defended
2000	KC	16	84	68	16	1.0	2	1	0	2	28	14	28	0	7
2001	KC	16	84	73	11	2.0	1	2	0	2	44	22	30	0	7
2002	KC	13	64	54	10	1.0	0	1	0	6	170	28	50	0	8
2003	KC	16	104	89	15	2.0	1	0	0	6	63	11	27	0	12
2004	KC	12	66	59	7	0.0	4	0	0	4	92	23	65	0	7
2005	KC	16	82	65	17	0.0	1	0	0	6	106	18	51	0	8
2006	KC	14	69	64	5	0.0	2	0	0	3	39	13	29	0	7
2007	KC	15	30	28	2	0.0	1	0	0	0	0	0	0	0	3
Career		118	583	500	83	6.0	12	4	0	29	542	19	65	0	59

== Personal life ==
Wesley's younger brother, Broderick Green, was a running back at the University of Southern California. He transferred in Oct. 2008 and joined the University of Arkansas football team in 2009.
