= Tony Richardson (American football) =

American football player (born 1971)

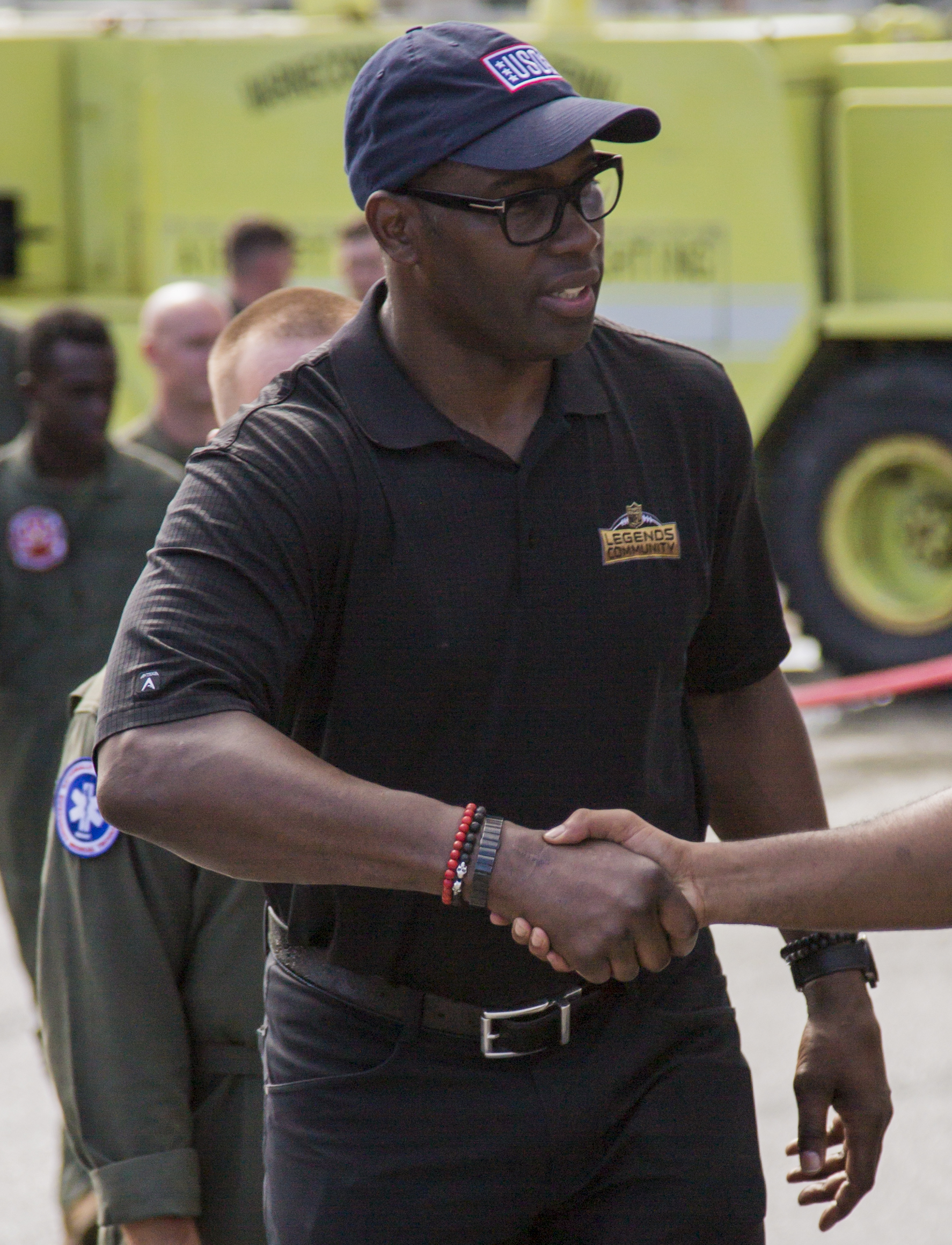
- Richardson visiting Marine Corps Air Station Futenma in 2018

No. 49
- Position: Fullback

Personal information
- Born: December 17, 1971 (age 54); Frankfurt, West Germany
- Listed height: 6 ft 1 in (1.85 m)
- Listed weight: 240 lb (109 kg)

Career information
- High school: Daleville (Daleville, Alabama, U.S.)
- College: Auburn
- NFL draft: 1994: undrafted

Career history
- Dallas Cowboys (1994)*; Kansas City Chiefs (1995–2005); Minnesota Vikings (2006–2007); New York Jets (2008–2010)
- * Offseason or practice squad member only

Awards and highlights
- 2× Second-team All-Pro (2004, 2007); 3× Pro Bowl (2003, 2004, 2007); "Whizzer" White NFL Man of the Year (2010); Walter Payton Award (2010); NFL 2000s All-Decade Team; Kansas City Chiefs Hall of Fame

Career NFL statistics
- Rushing yards: 1,727
- Rushing average: 4.0
- Rushing touchdowns: 15
- Receptions: 210
- Receiving yards: 1,543
- Receiving touchdowns: 9
- Stats at Pro Football Reference

Antonio Richardson (born December 17, 1971) is an American former professional football player who was a fullback for the Dallas Cowboys, Kansas City Chiefs, Minnesota Vikings, and New York Jets of the National Football League (NFL). He was signed by the Cowboys as an undrafted free agent in 1994. He played college football for the Auburn Tigers.

He is considered one of the best fullbacks in NFL history having blocked for 1,000 yards rushers in nine consecutive NFL seasons in addition to leading the Kansas City Chiefs in rushing yards in 2000. During those seasons he blocked for multiple Pro Bowl running backs including Priest Holmes, Larry Johnson, Adrian Peterson, Thomas Jones and LaDainian Tomlinson.

== Early life ==
Richardson did not start playing football until attending Daleville High School in Daleville, Alabama. As a senior, he posted 1,003 rushing yards. He also competed in basketball and baseball.

He accepted a football scholarship from Auburn University, where he was a three-year starter. As a true freshman, he became the second player to start his first game at Auburn for head coach Pat Dye.

As a junior, he began blocking for two-time All-SEC running back James Bostic. As a senior, he started all 11 games at fullback, contributing to the team having an undefeated season with an 11–0 record and finishing ranked #4 in the AP Poll. He registered 58 carries for 249 yards (third on the team), 4 rushing touchdowns, 28 receptions for 273 yards and 2 receiving touchdowns.

He finished his college career with 162 carries for 715 rushing yards, 9 rushing touchdowns, 44 receptions for 395 receiving yards and 2 receiving touchdowns.

In 2015, he was inducted into the Alabama Sports Hall of Fame.

== Professional career ==
=== Dallas Cowboys ===
Richardson was signed as an undrafted free agent by the Dallas Cowboys after the 1994 NFL draft. He was waived on April 29. He was later brought back to the team and given the chance to finish training camp. On August 28, he was released for a second time. On August 30, he was signed to the practice squad, where he remained the rest of the season as part of a team that included Pro Bowlers Emmitt Smith and Daryl Johnston. At the end of the year, he was declared a free agent.

=== Kansas City Chiefs ===
On February 28, 1995, Richardson signed as a free agent with the Kansas City Chiefs. He started one game in that season, and was noted for blocking for Hall of Famer Marcus Allen on his way to his 100th career touchdown.

In 1999, he became the starting fullback for the team, blocking for Donnell Bennett and Bam Morris. He later blocked for record setting running back Priest Holmes and the most productive seasons of Larry Johnson's career.

In 2000, he was given a chance to be the team's featured back in the fifteenth game against the Denver Broncos, posting 23 carries for 156 rushing yards and one touchdown. In 2001, the Chiefs signed free agent Priest Holmes and Richardson helped him lead the NFL in rushing yards (1,555). In 2002, with Richardson's blocking contribution, Holmes had the best season by a running back in Chiefs history, registering 1,615 rushing yards, 672 receiving yards and 24 touchdowns.

Richardson was named to USA Today's All-Joe Team in 2000 and 2001. He was selected to represent the AFC in the 2004 and 2005 Pro Bowls.

In 2016, he was inducted into the team's Hall of Fame during the 2016 season.

=== Minnesota Vikings ===
On March 21, 2006, Richardson signed with the Minnesota Vikings. He suffered a broken forearm in the ninth game against the Green Bay Packers. On November 22, he was placed on the injured reserve list. He was replaced with second year player Jeff Dugan. Richardson contributed to running back Chester Taylor's only career 1,000 rushing yard season.

In 2007, he appeared in 14 games with 3 starts and blocked for rookie Adrian Peterson. He was selected to represent the NFC in the 2008 Pro Bowl. At the end of the season, the Vikings did not re-sign Richardson, opting to pay for the cheaper Thomas Tapeh.

=== New York Jets ===
On March 6, 2008, Richardson signed a one-year contract with the New York Jets, reuniting with his former Chiefs running back coach Jimmy Raye II. He was re-signed by the team on February 27, 2009. Following the expiration of his previous contract, Richardson, once again, signed with the team on March 16, 2010. He was released on September 5, but a day later he was re-signed after the Jets reached a deal with cornerback Darrelle Revis. He wasn't re-signed after the season.

He was the recipient of the "Whizzer" White NFL Man of the Year Award at the end of the 2010 season. During his time with the Jets, Richardson helped Thomas Jones to two 1,000+ yard seasons.

== NFL career statistics ==
Legend
| **Bold** | Career high |

| Year | Team | Games | | Rushing | | | | | Receiving | | | | |
| Year | Team | GP | GS | Att | Yds | Avg | Lng | TD | Rec | Yds | Avg | Lng | TD |
|---|---|---|---|---|---|---|---|---|---|---|---|---|---|
| 1995 | KAN | 14 | 1 | 8 | 18 | 2.3 | 5 | 0 | 0 | 0 | 0.0 | 0 | 0 |
| 1996 | KAN | 13 | 0 | 4 | 10 | 2.5 | 4 | 0 | 2 | 18 | **9.0** | 17 | 1 |
| 1997 | KAN | 14 | 0 | 2 | 11 | 5.5 | 6 | 0 | 3 | 6 | 2.0 | 3 | **3** |
| 1998 | KAN | 14 | 1 | 20 | 45 | 2.3 | 6 | 2 | 2 | 13 | 6.5 | 15 | 0 |
| 1999 | KAN | 16 | 16 | 84 | 387 | 4.6 | 26 | 1 | 24 | 141 | 5.9 | 29 | 0 |
| 2000 | KAN | 16 | 16 | **147** | **697** | 4.7 | **33** | 3 | **58** | **468** | 8.1 | 24 | **3** |
| 2001 | KAN | 14 | 8 | 66 | 191 | 2.9 | 19 | **7** | 30 | 265 | 8.8 | **47** | 0 |
| 2002 | KAN | 14 | 12 | 22 | 81 | 3.7 | 14 | 2 | 18 | 125 | 6.9 | 23 | 1 |
| 2003 | KAN | 16 | 10 | 24 | 60 | 2.5 | 8 | 0 | 12 | 76 | 6.3 | 14 | 0 |
| 2004 | KAN | 16 | 16 | 12 | 56 | 4.7 | 13 | 0 | 19 | 118 | 6.2 | 22 | 0 |
| 2005 | KAN | 16 | 16 | 6 | 20 | 3.3 | 8 | 0 | 9 | 68 | 7.6 | 22 | 1 |
| 2006 | MIN | 9 | 7 | 5 | 12 | 2.4 | 3 | 0 | 13 | 111 | 8.5 | 25 | 0 |
| 2007 | MIN | 14 | 3 | 7 | 13 | 1.9 | 4 | 0 | 11 | 89 | 8.1 | 12 | 0 |
| 2008 | NYJ | 16 | 7 | 10 | 65 | 6.5 | 16 | 0 | 1 | 4 | 4.0 | 4 | 0 |
| 2009 | NYJ | 16 | 10 | 7 | 48 | **6.9** | 19 | 0 | 3 | 10 | 3.3 | 5 | 0 |
| 2010 | NYJ | 16 | 10 | 5 | 13 | 2.6 | 4 | 0 | 5 | 31 | 6.2. | 14 | 0 |
| | | 234 | 133 | 429 | 1,727 | 4.0 | 33 | 15 | 210 | 1,543 | 7.3 | 47 | 9 |

== Personal life ==
His father, sergeant major Ben Richardson, was stationed in Germany when Tony was born, and he lived there for the first eight years of his life. When they returned to the U.S., the family lived in Daleville, Alabama.

He received his Bachelor of Education degree in 2000, and later got his MBA from Webster University in 2004. Off the field, Richardson is very involved with local charities. He hosts the Kansas City chapter of the annual Special Olympics Punt, Pass & Kick competition, and has served as chairman of many charitable organizations and fundraisers. In 2002, he was nominated by his team for the NFL Man of the Year award. Richardson was elected to the NFLPA executive committee in 2008 for a two-year term.
