= Sylvester Morris =

American football player (born 1977)

No. 84
- Position: Wide receiver

Personal information
- Born: October 6, 1977 (age 49); New Orleans, Louisiana, U.S.
- Listed height: 6 ft 3 in (1.91 m)
- Listed weight: 212 lb (96 kg)

Career information
- High school: McDonogh No. 35 (New Orleans)
- College: Jackson State (1996–1999)
- NFL draft: 2000: 1st round, 21st overall pick

Career history
- Kansas City Chiefs (2000–2003); Tampa Bay Buccaneers (2004)*
- * Offseason or practice squad member only

Career NFL statistics
- Receptions: 48
- Receiving yards: 678
- Touchdowns: 3
- Stats at Pro Football Reference

Sylvester Morris Jr. (born October 6, 1977) is an American former professional football player who was a wide receiver for the Kansas City Chiefs of the National Football League (NFL).

Morris was an alum of McDonogh 35 High School in New Orleans before playing college football for the Jackson State Tigers. He was selected by the Chiefs in the first round (21st overall) of the 2000 NFL draft. In 2000, the only NFL season he actually played, he appeared in 15 games and had 48 receptions for 678 yards (14.1 yards per reception) and 3 touchdowns.

Morris signed with the Tampa Bay Buccaneers in 2004, though he sustained a season-ending injury during the offseason. His career was cut short by repeated knee injuries causing him to only actually play in one season despite being on the Chiefs roster for four seasons.
