= Darius Clark (American football) =

American football player (born 1977)

No. 47
- Position: Safety

Personal information
- Born: April 13, 1977 (age 49); Tampa, Florida, U.S.
- Listed height: 5 ft 10 in (1.78 m)
- Listed weight: 210 lb (95 kg)

Career information
- High school: Hillsborough (Tampa)
- College: Duke (1996–1999)
- NFL draft: 2000: undrafted

Career history
- Denver Broncos (2000–2002)

Career NFL statistics
- Games played: 7
- Tackles: 3
- Stats at Pro Football Reference

Darius Clark (born April 13, 1977) is an American former professional football safety who played in the National Football League (NFL) for the Denver Broncos. He played college football for the Duke Blue Devils.

== Early life ==
Clark was born on April 13, 1977, in Tampa, Florida. He attended Hillsborough High School in Tampa. Clark played at defensive back, wide receiver and kicker. He was a first-team All-State and All-Conference recipient.

== College career ==
Clark played college football for the Duke Blue Devils from 1996 to 1999 and was a four-year letterman. He had eight interceptions for 110 yards.

== Professional career ==
After going undrafted in the 2000 NFL draft, Clark signed with the Denver Broncos as an undrafted free agent. On August 27, he was released and signed to the practice squad the following day. On December 21, Clark was signed to the active roster but did not play in a game.

On September 2, 2001, Clark was released by the team and signed to the practice squad on September 4. On October 23, he was signed to the active roster and made his debut on October 28. Clark played in seven games and made three tackles before he tore his ACL in his left knee, ending his season. On August 26, 2002, he was released by the team.
