= Andre O'Neal =

American football player and Actor (born 1975)

No. 52, 53, 96
- Position: Linebacker

Personal information
- Born: December 12, 1975; Decatur, Georgia, U.S.
- Listed height: 6 ft 1 in (1.85 m)
- Listed weight: 235 lb (107 kg)

Career information
- High school: Cedar Grove (Ellenwood, Georgia)
- College: Marshall
- NFL draft: 2000: undrafted

Career history
- Kansas City Chiefs (2000–2001); Green Bay Packers (2001); Minnesota Vikings (2001)

Awards and highlights
- NCAA I-AA national champion (1996); Second-team All-MAC (1999)

Career NFL statistics
- Tackles: 42
- Sacks: 0
- Interceptions: 0
- Stats at Pro Football Reference

Andre T. O'Neal (born December 12, 1975) is an American former professional football player who was a linebacker in the National Football League (NFL) for the Kansas City Chiefs, Green Bay Packers, and Minnesota Vikings. O'Neal played college football for the Marshall Thundering Hers before playing in the NFL for three seasons.
