= Jerry Johnson (defensive tackle) =

American football player (born 1977)

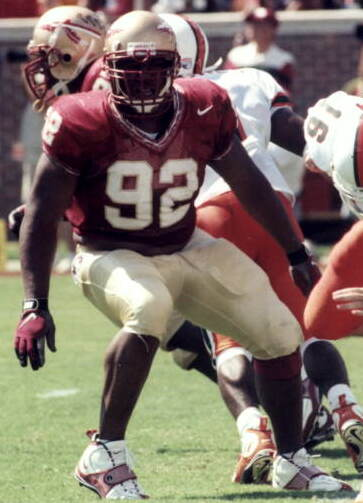
- Johnson with the Florida State Seminoles in 1997

No. 90
- Position: Defensive tackle

Personal information
- Born: July 11, 1977 (age 49); Fort Pierce, Florida, U.S.
- Listed height: 6 ft 0 in (1.83 m)
- Listed weight: 290 lb (132 kg)

Career information
- High school: Central (Fort Pierce)
- College: Florida State
- NFL draft: 2000: 4th round, 101st overall pick

Career history
- Denver Broncos (2000–2001)

Awards and highlights
- BCS national champion (1999); First-team All-ACC (1999)

Career NFL statistics
- Games played: 9
- Total tackles: 12
- Stats at Pro Football Reference

Jerry Johnson (born July 11, 1977) is an American former professional football player who was a defensive tackle in the National Football League (NFL). After playing college football for the Florida State Seminoles, he was selected in the fourth round, 101st overall, in the 2000 NFL draft, and spent two seasons with the NFL's Denver Broncos until being released in August 2002.

His sons, Jerry Johnson III and Chantz Johnson, also play football.
