= Frank Moreau =

American football player (born 1976)

No. 46, 22, 32
- Position: Running back

Personal information
- Born: September 9, 1976 (age 50); Pineville, Louisiana, U.S.
- Listed height: 6 ft 0 in (1.83 m)
- Listed weight: 223 lb (101 kg)

Career information
- High school: Central Hardin (Elizabethtown, Kentucky)
- College: Louisville (1995–1999)
- NFL draft: 2000: 4th round, 115th overall pick

Career history
- Kansas City Chiefs (2000); Jacksonville Jaguars (2001); Houston Texans (2002)*; Kansas City Chiefs (2002)*; Rhein Fire (2003); New England Patriots (2003–2004)*; Jacksonville Jaguars (2004)*
- * Offseason or practice squad member only

Career NFL statistics
- Rushing attempts: 75
- Rushing yards: 206
- Yards per attempt: 2.7
- Touchdowns: 5
- Stats at Pro Football Reference

Franklin H. Moreau (born September 9, 1976) is an American former professional football player who was a running back for the Kansas City Chiefs and Jacksonville Jaguars of the National Football League (NFL). He was selected by the Chiefs in the fourth round of the 2000 NFL draft after playing college football for the Louisville Cardinals. He was also a member of the Houston Texans and New England Patriots but did not appear in any games for either team.

== Early life ==
Moreau was born on September 9, 1976, in Pineville, Louisiana. He played high school football at Central Hardin High School in Elizabethtown, Kentucky. He rushed for 1,514 yards and 11 touchdowns his senior year, including a (since broken) single-game school record of 291 yards. Moreau also earned all-state honors that year and was named to the Kentucky-Tennessee All-Star Game.

== College career ==
Moreau played college football for the Louisville Cardinals from 1995 to 1999. After a series of injuries to the team's running backs, Moreau saw significant playing time during the final five games of the 1995 season, rushing 96 times for 416 yards and two touchdowns. He earned the starting job to begin the 1996 season but suffered a season-ending knee injury during the first game. He returned to the team in 1997 as a backup but regained the starting job partway through the season, recording 120 carries for 573 yards and five touchdowns. Moreau spent the 1998 season as a backup to Leroy Collins, rushing 43 times for 307 yards and three touchdowns. After Collins declared for the NFL draft, Moreau returned as the starter for his redshirt senior year in 1999, totaling 233 rushing attempts for 1,289 yards and 17 touchdowns while also catching 38 passes for 285 yards. He also played the majority of his senior season with a broken hand.

His 2,599 career rushing yards were fifth best in school history. He graduated from Louisville with a master's degree in Sports Administration.

== Professional career ==
Moreau was selected by the Kansas City Chiefs in the fourth round, with the 115th overall pick, of the 2000 NFL draft. He officially signed with the team on June 6. He played in 11 games during his rookie season in 2000, rushing 67 times for 179 yards and four touchdowns. Moreau was waived by the Chiefs on September 2, 2001.

He was claimed off waivers by the Jacksonville Jaguars on September 3, 2001. He played in three games, starting one, for the Jaguars in 2001, recording eight carries for 27 yards and one touchdown. Moreau was waived on November 27, 2001.

He signed a reserve/future contract with the Houston Texans on January 9, 2002. He was waived by the Texans on June 13, 2002.

Moreau was signed by the Chiefs again on August 13, 2002, but was soon released on August 26, 2002.

He appeared in all 10 games, starting three, for the Rhein Fire of NFL Europe in 2003, rushing 99 times for 462 yards and two touchdowns. He also caught three passes for 21 yards.

Moreau signed with the New England Patriots on August 1, 2003, but was waived on August 28, 2003. He later signed a reserve/future contract with the Patriots on January 7, 2004. He was waived on June 8, 2004.

Moreau was signed by the Jaguars on August 23, 2004. He was waived on August 30, 2004.
