= Norris McCleary =

American football player (born 1977)

No. 71, 75
- Position: Defensive tackle

Personal information
- Born: May 10, 1977 (age 49); Shelby, North Carolina, U.S.
- Listed height: 6 ft 6 in (1.98 m)
- Listed weight: 305 lb (138 kg)

Career information
- High school: Bessemer City (Bessemer City, North Carolina)
- College: East Carolina
- NFL draft: 2000: undrafted

Career history
- Kansas City Chiefs (2000–2001); → Frankfurt Galaxy (2002); Seattle Seahawks (2002); Cincinnati Bengals (2004)*; Columbus Destroyers (2005); Dallas Desperados (2006)
- * Offseason or practice squad member only
- Stats at Pro Football Reference
- Stats at ArenaFan.com

Norris Ellington McCleary (born May 10, 1977) is an American former professional football defensive tackle. He played for the Kansas City Chiefs from 2000 to 2001. He is a defensive line coach for Southern Durham High School.
