= 2002 Denver Broncos season =

American football team season

- Owner: Pat Bowlen
- General manager: Ted Sundquist and Mike Shanahan
- President: Pat Bowlen
- Head coach: Mike Shanahan
- Home stadium: Invesco Field at Mile High

Results
- Record: 9–7
- Division place: 2nd AFC West
- Playoffs: Did not qualify
- All-Pros: None
- Pro Bowlers: DE Trevor Pryce; LB Al Wilson

The 2002 season was the Denver Broncos' 43rd in professional football and their 33rd in the National Football League.

With the sudden retirement of Terrell Davis in the preseason, Denver had to rely on rookie Clinton Portis, who provided an instant spark to the Broncos running game. Despite his contribution, however, the Broncos finished with a 9–7 record and narrowly missed the postseason.

== Offseason ==
Additions	Subtractions
TE Shannon Sharpe (Ravens)
T Blake Brockermeyer (Bears)	S Eric Brown (Texans)
DT Lional Dalton (Ravens)	RB Tony Carter (Packers)
S Izell Reese (Cowboys)	QB Gus Frerotte (Bengals)
T Ephraim Salaam (Falcons)	LB Bill Romanowski (Raiders)
	FB Detron Smith (Colts)
	T Trey Teague (Bills)
	RB Terrell Davis (retirement)

=== NFL draft ===
2002 Denver Broncos draft
Round	Pick	Player	Position	College	Notes
1	19	Ashley Lelie	Wide receiver	Hawaii	
2	51	Clinton Portis *	Running back	Miami	
3	96	Dorsett Davis	Defensive tackle	Mississippi State	from New England viaWashington and Baltimore
4	131	Sam Brandon	Safety	UNLV	from New England
5	144	Herb Haygood	Wide receiver	Michigan State	from Jacksonville via New England
6	191	Jeb Putzier	Tight end	Boise State	
7	228	Chris Young	Safety	Georgia Tech	from Atlanta
7	231	Monsanto Pope	Defensive tackle	Virginia	
Made roster * Made at least one Pro Bowl during career

=== Undrafted free agents ===
2002 undrafted free agents of note
Player	Position	College
Charlie Adams	Wide receiver	Hofstra
Will Bartholomew	Fullback	Tennessee
Jared Peck	Tackle	North Dakota State
Jason Scukanec	Center	BYU
Lenny Walls	Cornerback	Boston College

== Personnel ==
=== Staff / Coaches ===
2002 Denver Broncos staff
Front office: President and chief executive officer – Pat Bowlen; General manager – Ted Sundquist; Director of football administration – Neal Dahlen; Director of pro personnel – Rick Smith; Director of college scouting – Jim Goodman; Head coaches: Executive vice president of football operations/head coach – Mike Shanahan; Assistant head coach/offensive line – Alex Gibbs; Assistant to head coach – George Dyer; Offensive coaches: Offensive coordinator/quarterbacks – Gary Kubiak; Running backs – Bobby Turner; Wide receivers – Karl Dorrell; Tight ends – Brian Pariani; Offensive line – Rick Dennison; Offensive assistant – Pat McPherson	Defensive coaches: Defensive coordinator – Ray Rhodes; Defensive line – Jacob Burney; Assistant defensive line/pass rush specialist – Keith Millard; Linebackers – Larry Coyer; Secondary – David Gibbs; Nickel backs – Ron Milus; Defensive assistant – Steve Watson; Special teams coaches: Special teams – Frank Bush; Special teams assistant – Anthony Lynn; Strength and conditioning: Strength and conditioning – Rich Tuten; Assistant strength and conditioning – Greg Saporta; Assistant strength and conditioning – Cedric Smith

=== Roster ===
2002 Denver Broncos roster
Quarterbacks (QB): 11 Steve Beuerlein; 14 Brian Griese; 17 Jarious Jackson; Running backs (RB): 38 Mike Anderson; 21 KaRon Coleman; 34 Reuben Droughns; 22 Olandis Gary; 39 Kyle Johnson; 26 Clinton Portis; Wide receivers (WR): 82 Herb Haygood; 85 Ashley Lelie; 87 Ed McCaffrey; 83 Scottie Montgomery; 80 Rod Smith; Tight ends (TE): 89 Dwayne Carswell; 86 Patrick Hape; 88 Jeb Putzier; 84 Shannon Sharpe	Offensive linemen (OL): 71 Blake Brockermeyer T; 65 Cooper Carlisle T; 64 Lennie Friedman G; 50 Ben Hamilton C; 79 Steve Herndon G; 78 Matt Lepsis T; 62 Dan Neil G; 74 Ephraim Salaam T; Defensive linemen (DL): 92 Bertrand Berry DE; 91 Lional Dalton DT; 96 Dorsett Davis DE; 91 Chester McGlockton DT; 75 Monsanto Pope DT; 95 Kavika Pittman DE; 93 Trevor Pryce DE; 99 Montae Reagor DT; 97 Keith Washington DE	Linebackers (LB): 55 Keith Burns MLB; 52 Ian Gold OLB; 51 John Mobley OLB; 59 Donnie Spragan OLB; 56 Al Wilson MLB; Defensive backs (DB): 42 Sam Brandon SS; 31 Kelly Herndon CB; 28 Kenoy Kennedy SS; 23 Willie Middlebrooks CB; 24 Deltha O'Neal CB; 33 Jimmy Spencer CB; 37 Tyrone Poole CB; 43 Izell Reese FS; 25 Denard Walker CB; 35 Lenny Walls CB; Special teams (ST): 1 Jason Elam K; 4 Micah Knorr P; 48 Mike Leach LS	Practice squad: 12 Charlie Adams WR; 15 Frank Rice WR; 57 Jashon Sykes LB; 67 Chris Watton G; 32 Chris Young S; Reserve: 81 Chris Cole WR (IR); 30 Terrell Davis RB (IR); 49 Matt Dominguez TE (IR); 98 Reggie Hayward DE (IR); -- Phil McGeoghan WR (NF-Inj.); 66 Tom Nalen C (IR); Rookies in italics 53 active, 6 reserve, 5 practice squad

== Regular season ==
=== Schedule ===
Week	Date	Opponent	Result	Record	Venue	Attendance
1	September 8	St. Louis Rams	W 23–16	1–0	Invesco Field at Mile High	75,710
2	September 15	at San Francisco 49ers	W 24–14	2–0	3Com Park	67,685
3	September 22	Buffalo Bills	W 28–23	3–0	Invesco Field at Mile High	75,359
4	September 30	at Baltimore Ravens	L 23–34	3–1	Ravens Stadium	69,538
5	October 6	San Diego Chargers	W 26–9	4–1	Invesco Field at Mile High	75,065
6	October 13	Miami Dolphins	L 22–24	4–2	Invesco Field at Mile High	75,941
7	October 20	at Kansas City Chiefs	W 37–34 (OT)	5–2	Arrowhead Stadium	78,446
8	October 27	at New England Patriots	W 24–16	6–2	Gillette Stadium	68,436
9	Bye					
10	November 11	Oakland Raiders	L 10–34	6–3	Invesco Field at Mile High	76,643
11	November 17	at Seattle Seahawks	W 31–9	7–3	Seahawks Stadium	65,495
12	November 24	Indianapolis Colts	L 20–23 (OT)	7–4	Invesco Field at Mile High	75,075
13	December 1	at San Diego Chargers	L 27–30 (OT)	7–5	Qualcomm Stadium	66,357
14	December 8	at New York Jets	L 13–19	7–6	The Meadowlands	78,521
15	December 15	Kansas City Chiefs	W 31–24	8–6	Invesco Field at Mile High	75,947
16	December 22	at Oakland Raiders	L 16–28	8–7	Network Associates Coliseum	62,592
17	December 29	Arizona Cardinals	W 37–7	9–7	Invesco Field at Mile High	75,164

=== Game summaries ===
==== Week 3: vs. Buffalo Bills ====
Week 3: Buffalo Bills (1–1) at Denver Broncos (2–0) – Game summary

Quarter	1	2	3	4	Total
Bills	0	7	3	13	23
Broncos	7	7	7	7	28

at Invesco Field at Mile High, Denver, Colorado

- Date: September 22, 2002
- Game time: 4:05 pm
- Game weather: Sunny, 59 °F or 15 °C
- Game attendance: 75,359
- Referee: Walt Coleman (65)
- TV announcers (CBS): Kevin Harlan, Randy Cross and Beasley Reece
- Recap, Game Book

Game information

First quarter

- DEN – Chester McGlockton 24-yard fumble return (Jason Elam kick), 4:40. Broncos 7–0.

Second quarter

- DEN – Clinton Portis 1-yard run (Jason Elam kick), 9:51. Broncos 14–0. Drive: 10 plays, 85 yards, 5:09.
- BUF – Travis Henry 1-yard run (Mike Hollis kick), 2:54. Broncos 14–7. Drive: 9 plays, 80 yards, 4:59.

Third quarter

- BUF – Mike Hollis 38-yard field goal, 10:02. Broncos 14–10. Drive: 10 plays, 68 yards, 5:02.
- DEN – Dwayne Carswell 1-yard pass from Brian Griese (Jason Elam kick), 2:00. Broncos 21–10. Drive: 11 plays, 80 yards, 5:22.

Fourth quarter

- BUF – Josh Reed 4-yard pass from Drew Bledsoe (2 Pt failed), 7:40. Broncos 21–16. Drive: 3 plays, 12 yards, 0:43.
- DEN – Rod Smith 26-yard pass from Brian Griese (Jason Elam kick), 2:45. Broncos 28–16. Drive: 10 plays, 80 yards, 4:56.
- BUF – Eric Moulds 2-yard pass from Drew Bledsoe (Mike Hollis Kick), 1:40. Broncos 28–23. Drive: 7 plays, 70 yards, 1:27.

Top passers

- BUF – Drew Bledsoe – 27/41, 283 yards, 2 TD
- DEN – Brian Griese – 19/31, 211 yards, 2 TD

Top rushers

- BUF – Travis Henry – 12 rushes, 35 yards, TD
- DEN – Clinton Portis – 18 rushes, 103 yards, TD

Top receivers

- BUF – Eric Moulds – 9 receptions, 96 yards, TD
- DEN – Rod Smith – 7 receptions, 94 yards, TD

==== Week 5: vs. San Diego Chargers ====
Week 5: San Diego Chargers (4–0) at Denver Broncos (3–1) – Game summary

Quarter	1	2	3	4	Total
Chargers	0	0	3	6	9
Broncos	7	12	0	7	26

at Invesco Field at Mile High, Denver, Colorado

- Date: October 6
- Game time: 2:05 p.m. MDT
- Game weather: 57 °F (14 °C), relative humidity 45%, wind 9 mph
- Game attendance: 75,065
- Referee: Dick Hantak
- TV announcers (CBS): Ian Eagle and Solomon Wilcots
- Box score, Game Book

Game information

First quarter

- DEN – Ed McCaffrey 69-yard pass from Brian Griese (Jason Elam kick), 12:57. Broncos 7–0. Drive: 2 plays, 72 yards, 0:43.

Second quarter

- DEN – Clinton Portis 8-yard pass from Brian Griese (Jason Elam kick), 4:25. Broncos 14–0. Drive: 13 plays, 84 yards, 7:55.
- DEN – Punt blocked by Sam Brandon out of bounds in end zone for a Safety, 2:22. Broncos 16–0.
- DEN – Jason Elam 36-yard field goal, 0:00. Broncos 19–0. Drive: 12 plays, 60 yards, 2:22.

Third quarter

- SDG – Steve Christie 24-yard field goal, 10:40. Broncos 19–3. Drive: 8 plays, 44 yards, 2:49.

Fourth quarter

- DEN – Deltha O'Neal 28-yard interception return (Jason Elam kick), 2:54. Broncos 26–3.
- SDG – Curtis Conway 8-yard pass from Drew Brees (pass failed), 1:31. Broncos 26–9. Drive: 11 plays, 78 yards, 1:23.

Top passers

- SDG – Drew Brees – 26/42, 235 yards, TD, 2 INT
- DEN – Brian Griese – 26/35, 316 yards, 2 TD, INT

Top rushers

- SDG – LaDainian Tomlinson – 14 rushes, 48 yards
- DEN – Clinton Portis – 20 rushes, 102 yards

Top receivers

- SDG – Curtis Conway – 6 receptions, 68 yards, TD
  SDG – Tim Dwight – 5 receptions, 68 yards
- DEN – Ed McCaffrey – 6 receptions, 113 yards, TD

==== Week 6: vs. Miami Dolphins ====
Week 6: Miami Dolphins (4–1) at Denver Broncos (4–1) – Game summary

Quarter	1	2	3	4	Total
Dolphins	0	7	0	17	24
Broncos	6	3	3	10	22

at Invesco Field at Mile High, Denver, Colorado

- Date: October 13, 2002
- Game time: 8:35 p.m.
- Game weather: Clear, 58 °F (14 °C)
- Game attendance: 75,941
- Referee: Tony Corrente (99)
- TV announcers (ESPN): Mike Patrick, Paul Maguire, Joe Theismann and Suzy Kolber
- Recap, Game Book

Game information

First quarter

- DEN – Jason Elam 33-yard field goal, 12:09. Broncos 3–0. Drive: 7 plays, 24 yards, 2:51.
- DEN – Jason Elam 52-yard field goal, 4:14. Broncos 6–0. Drive: 11 plays, 40 yards, 6:18.

Second quarter

- DEN – Jason Elam 23-yard field goal, 11:25. Broncos 9–0. Drive: 13 plays, 57 yards, 6:00.
- MIA – Ricky Williams 10-yard run (Olindo Mare kick), 7:11. Broncos 9–7. Drive: 8 plays, 76 yards, 4:14.

Third quarter

- DEN – Jason Elam 40-yard field goal, 13:44. Broncos 12–7. Drive: 4 plays, 0 yards, 0:20.

Fourth quarter

- MIA – Ricky Williams 2-yard run (Olindo Mare kick), 9:48. Dolphins 14–12. Drive: 6 plays, 52 yards, 3:08.
- MIA – Patrick Surtain 40-yard interception return (Olindo Mare kick), Dolphins 21–12.
- DEN – Mike Anderson 1-yard pass from Brian Griese (Jason Elam kick), 3:37. Dolphins 21–19. Drive: 11 plays, 80 yards, 4:36.
- DEN – Jason Elam 55-yard field goal, 0:45. Broncos 22–21. Drive: 6 plays, 43 yards, 1:06.
- MIA – Olindo Mare 53-yard field goal, 0:06. Dolphins 24–22. Drive: 5 plays, 39 yards, 0:39.

Top passers

- MIA – Jay Fiedler – 19/29, 210 yards, INT
- DEN – Brian Griese – 27/46, 335 yards, TD, 2 INT

Top rushers

- MIA – Ricky Williams – 20 rushes, 49 yards, 2 TD
- DEN – Clinton Portis – 18 rushes, 75 yards

Top receivers

- MIA – Oronde Gadsden – 5 receptions, 77 yards
- DEN – Rod Smith – 9 receptions, 88 yards

==== Week 7: at Kansas City Chiefs ====
Week 7: Denver Broncos (4–2) at Kansas City Chiefs (3–3) – Game summary

Quarter	1	2	3	4	OT	Total
Broncos	3	3	14	14	3	37
Chiefs	7	6	14	7	0	34

at Arrowhead Stadium, Kansas City, Missouri

- Date: October 20
- Game time: 12:00 p.m. CDT
- Game weather: Sunny, 51 °F (11 °C)
- Game attendance: 78,446
- Referee: Bill Leavy
- TV announcers (CBS): Kevin Harlan, Randy Cross, and Beasley Reece
- Recap, Game Book

Game information

First quarter

- KC – Priest Holmes 1-yard run (Morten Andersen kick), 9:24. Chiefs 7–0. Drive: 9 plays, 66 yards, 5:36.
- DEN – Jason Elam 32-yard field goal, 2:49. Chiefs 7–3. Drive: 12 plays, 61 yards, 6:35.

Second quarter

- KC – Morten Andersen 41-yard field goal, 9:31. Chiefs 10–3. Drive: 11 plays, 32 yards, 3:52.
- KC – Morten Andersen 32-yard field goal, 3:06. Chiefs 13–3. Drive: 5 plays, 23 yard, 1:31.
- DEN – Jason Elam 33-yard field goal, 0:07. Chiefs 13–6. Drive: 11 plays, 52 yards, 2:59.

Third quarter

- DEN – Shannon Sharpe 82-yard pass from Brian Griese (Jason Elam kick), 11:38. Tied 13–13. Drive: 2 plays, 87 yards, 0:50.
- KC – Tony Richardson 14-yard run (Morten Andersen kick), 8:28. Chiefs 20–13. Drive: 5 plays, 44 yards, 3:10.
- DEN – Clinton Portis 2-yard run (Jason Elam kick), 4:37. Tied 20–20. Drive: 9 plays, 63 yards, 3:51.
- KC – Priest Holmes 4-yard run (Morten Andersen kick), 0:37. Chiefs 27–20. Drive: 9 plays, 70 yards, 4:00.

Fourth quarter

- KC – Priest Holmes 1-yard run (Morten Andersen kick), 12:42. Chiefs 34–20. Drive: 2 plays, 5 yards, 0:09.
- DEN – Shannon Sharpe 28-yard pass from Brian Griese (Jason Elam kick), 10:51. Chiefs 34–27. Drive: 4 plays, 70 yards, 1:51.
- DEN – Mike Anderson 2-yard run (Jason Elam kick), 0:21. Tied 34–34. Drive: 11 plays, 67 yards, 3:26.

Overtime

- DEN – Jason Elam 25-yard field goal, 12:03. Broncos 37–34. Drive: 3 plays, 25 yards, 0:42.

Top passers

- DEN – Brian Griese – 30/50, 376 yards, 2 TD
- KC – Trent Green – 20/33, 172 yards

Top rushers

- DEN – Clinton Portis – 15 rushes, 70 yards, TD
- KC – Priest Holmes – 24 rushes, 113 yards, 3 TD

Top receivers

- DEN – Shannon Sharpe – 12 receptions, 214 yards, 2 TD
- KC – Tony Gonzalez – 5 receptions, 58 yards

==== Week 8: at New England Patriots ====
Week 8: Denver Broncos (5–2) at New England Patriots (3–3) – Game summary

Quarter	1	2	3	4	Total
Broncos	7	14	0	3	24
Patriots	0	7	3	6	16

at Gillette Stadium, Foxborough, Massachusetts

- Date: October 27, 2002
- Game time: 4:15 p.m.
- Game weather: Sunny, 60 °F (16 °C)
- Game attendance: 68,436
- Referee: Tom White (123)
- TV announcers (CBS): Greg Gumbel, Phil Simms, and Armen Keteyian
- Recap, Game Book

Game information

First quarter

- DEN – Clinton Portis 1-yard run (Jason Elam kick), 10:08. Broncos 7–0. Drive: 7 plays, 48 yards, 3:10.

Second quarter

- DEN – Shannon Sharpe 8-yard pass from Brian Griese (Jason Elam kick), 14:55. Broncos 14–0. Drive: 9 plays, 72 yards, 4:56.
- NE – Antowain Smith 3-yard run (Adam Vinatieri kick), 7:16. Broncos 14–7. Drive: 6 plays, 42 yards, 2:54.
- DEN – Clinton Portis 4-yard run (Jason Elam kick), 2:45. Broncos 21–7. Drive: 8 plays, 70 yards, 4:31.

Third quarter

- NE – Adam Vinatieri 26-yard field goal, 7:26. Broncos 21–10. Drive: 7 plays, 54 yards, 2:51.

Fourth quarter

- NE – Christian Fauria 8-yard pass from Tom Brady (pass failed), 14:55. Broncos 21–16. Drive: 4 plays, 35 yards, 1:07.
- DEN – Jason Elam 19-yard field goal, 9:45. Broncos 24–16. Drive: 11 plays, 67 yards, 5:10.

Top passers

- DEN – Brian Griese – 18/23, 229 yards, TD, INT
- NE – Tom Brady – 15/29, 130 yards, TD

Top rushers

- DEN – Clinton Portis – 26 rushes, 111 yards, 2 TD
- NE – Antowain Smith – 13 rushes, 58 yards, TD

Top receivers

- DEN – Ed McCaffrey – 8 receptions, 116 yards
- NE – Troy Brown – 7 receptions, 59 yards

==== Week 11: at Seattle Seahawks ====
Week 11: Denver Broncos (6–3) at Seattle Seahawks (3–6) – Game summary

Quarter	1	2	3	4	Total
Broncos	0	3	7	21	31
Seahawks	0	0	6	3	9

at Seahawks Stadium, Seattle

- Date: November 17
- Game time: 1:16pm local
- Game weather: partly cloudy, 53 °F (12 °C), 71% humidity, wind SW 8 miles per hour (13 km/h)
- Game attendance: 65,495
- Referee: Larry Nemmers
- TV announcers (CBS): Dick Enberg, Dan Dierdorf, and Bonnie Bernstein
- Gamecenter, Gamebook

Game information

First quarter

- No scoring plays

Second quarter

- DEN – Jason Elam 45-yard field goal, 5:02 (DEN 3–0)

Third quarter

- SEA – Rian Lindell 52-yard field goal, 13:06 (Tied 3–3)
- DEN – Mike Anderson 9-yard run (Jason Elam kick), 11:15 (DEN 10–3)
- SEA – Rian Lindell 37-yard field goal, 6:00 (DEN 10–6)

Fourth quarter

- DEN – Patrick Hape 1-yard pass from Steve Beuerlein (Jason Elam kick), 14:55 (DEN 17–6)
- SEA – Rian Lindell 29-yard field goal, 8:57 (DEN 17–9)
- DEN – Rod Smith 14-yard pass from Steve Beuerlein (Jason Elam kick), 5:20 (DEN 24–9)
- DEN – Deltha O'Neal 22-yard interception return (Jason Elam kick), 0:14 (DEN 31–9)

Top passers

- DEN – Brian Griese: 17/27, 194 yds, 1 INT
- SEA – Matt Hasselbeck: 22/36, 180 yds, 2 INT

Top rushers

- DEN – Clinton Portis: 23 car, 136 yds
- SEA – Shaun Alexander: 11 car, 18 yds

Top receivers

- DEN – Rod Smith: 5 rec, 58 yds, 1 TD
- SEA – Itula Mili: 4 rec, 41 yds

Team – pass – rush – total – to

- DEN – 199 – 202 – 401 – 1
- SEA – 153 – 51 – 204 – 3

==== Week 13: at San Diego Chargers ====
Week 13: Denver Broncos (7–4) at San Diego Chargers (7–4) – Game summary

Quarter	1	2	3	4	OT	Total
Broncos	10	7	7	3	0	27
Chargers	0	24	0	3	3	30

at Qualcomm Stadium, San Diego, California

- Date: December 1
- Game time: 1:05 p.m. PST
- Game weather: 65 °F (18 °C), relative humidity 68%, wind 7 mph
- Game attendance: 66,357
- Referee: Tony Corrente
- TV announcers (CBS): Dick Enberg, Dan Dierdorf and Bonnie Bernstein
- Box score, Game Book

Game information

First quarter

- DEN – Jason Elam 54-yard field goal, 6:44. Broncos 3–0. Drive: 7 plays, 44 yards, 3:19.
- DEN – Clinton Portis 43-yard run (Jason Elam kick), 0:20. Broncos 10–0. Drive: 3 plays, 68 yards, 1:10.

Second quarter

- SDG – LaDainian Tomlinson 3-yard run (Steve Christie kick), 14:56. Broncos 10–7. Drive: 2 plays, 82 yards, 0:24.
- SDG – LaDainian Tomlinson 1-yard run (Steve Christie kick), 9:26. Chargers 14–10. Drive: 5 plays, 41 yards, 2:11.
- SDG – LaDainian Tomlinson 5-yard run (Steve Christie kick), 4:38. Chargers 21–10. Drive: 6 plays, 17 yards, 3:52.
- DEN – Clinton Portis 8-yard run (Jason Elam kick), 3:08. Chargers 21–17. Drive: 3 plays, 60 yards, 1:30.
- SDG – Steve Christie 20-yard field goal, 0:07. Chargers 24–17. Drive: 11 plays, 67 yards, 3:01.

Third quarter

- DEN – Reuben Droughns 22-yard pass from Steve Beuerlein (Jason Elam kick), 9:39. Tied 24–24. Drive: 10 plays, 65 yards, 5:21.

Fourth quarter

- SDG – Steve Christie 40-yard field goal, 13:12. Chargers 27–24. Drive: 4 plays, 8 yards, 1:42.
- DEN – Jason Elam 24-yard field goal, 1:39. Tied 27–27. Drive: 11 plays, 53 yards, 3:28.

Overtime

- SDG – Steve Christie 27-yard field goal, 3:01. Chargers 30–27. Drive: 9 plays, 48 yards, 4:25.

Top passers

- DEN – Steve Beuerlein – 22/39, 288 yards, TD, 2 INT
- SDG – Drew Brees – 27/41, 217 yards

Top rushers

- DEN – Clinton Portis – 23 rushes, 159 yards, 2 TD
- SDG – LaDainian Tomlinson – 37 rushes, 220 yards, 3 TD

Top receivers

- DEN – Ed McCaffrey – 7 receptions, 126 yards
- SDG – LaDainian Tomlinson – 11 receptions, 51 yards

==== Week 14: at New York Jets ====
Week 14: Denver Broncos (7–5) at New York Jets (6–6) – Game summary

Quarter	1	2	3	4	Total
Broncos	3	10	0	0	13
Jets	0	6	3	10	19

at Giants Stadium, East Rutherford, New Jersey

- Date: December 8, 2002
- Game time: 4:15 p.m.
- Game attendance: 78,521
- Referee: Tom White (123)
- TV announcers (CBS): Dick Enberg, Dan Dierdorf, and Bonnie Bernstein
- Recap, Game Book

Game information

First quarter

- DEN – Jason Elam 22-yard field goal, 6:59. Broncos 3–0. Drive: 14 plays, 68 yards, 8:01..

Second quarter

- NYJ – Curtis Martin 1-yard run (kick blocked), 14:57. Jets 6–3. Drive: 13 plays, 76 yards, 7:02..
- DEN – Jason Elam 23-yard field goal, 8:34. Tied 6–6. Drive: 13 plays, 60 yards, 6:23..
- DEN – Ashley Lelie 10-yard pass from Brian Griese (Jason Elam kick), 0:11. Broncos 13–6. Drive: 8 plays, 67 yards, 1:36..

Third quarter

- NYJ – John Hall 43-yard field goal, 10:21. Broncos 13–9. Drive: 9 plays, 30 yards, 4:39..

Fourth quarter

- NYJ – Laveranues Coles 28-yard pass from Chad Pennington (John Hall kick), 14:43. Jets 16–13. Drive: 8 plays, 64 yards, 3:25..
- NYJ – John Hall 24-yard field goal, 5:56. Jets 19–13. Drive: 14 plays, 72 yards, 7:19..

Top passers

- DEN – Brian Griese – 28/37, 266 yards, TD, INT
- NYJ – Chad Pennington – 19/30, 244 yards, TD

Top rushers

- DEN – Clinton Portis – 24 rushes, 103 yards
- NYJ – Curtis Martin – 18 rushes, 57 yards, TD

Top receivers

- DEN – Shannon Sharpe – 9 receptions, 100 yards
- NYJ – Laveranues Coles – 6 receptions, 126 yards, TD

==== Week 15: vs. Kansas City Chiefs ====
Week 15: Kansas City Chiefs (7–6) at Denver Broncos (7–6) – Game summary

Quarter	1	2	3	4	Total
Chiefs	0	0	14	10	24
Broncos	14	0	14	3	31

at Invesco Field at Mile High, Denver, Colorado

- Date: December 15
- Game time: 3:05 p.m. CST/2:05 p.m. MST
- Game weather: Mostly cloudy, 54 °F (12 °C)
- Game attendance: 75,947
- Referee: Bill Carollo
- TV announcers (CBS): Dick Enberg, Dan Dierdorf, and Bonnie Bernstein
- Recap, Game Book

Game information

First quarter

- DEN – Clinton Portis 51-yard run (Jason Elam kick), 12:01. Broncos 7–0. Drive: 6 plays, 79 yards, 2:59.
- DEN – Clinton Portis 3-yard run (Jason Elam kick), 0:33. Broncos 14–0. Drive: 6 plays, 67 yards, 2:55.

Second quarter

- No scoring plays.

Third quarter

- KC – Dante Hall 75-yard pass from Trent Green (Morten Andersen kick), 11:28. Broncos 14–7. Drive: 2 plays, 75 yards, 0:24.
- DEN – Clinton Portis 1-yard run (Jason Elam kick), 6:32. Broncos 21–7. Drive: 10 plays, 68 yards, 4:56.
- DEN – Clinton Portis 66-yard pass from Brian Griese (Jason Elam kick), 3:53. Broncos 28–7. Drive: 1 play, 66 yards, 0:15.
- KC – Mike Cloud 4-yard run (Morten Andersen kick), 0:00. Broncos 28–14. Drive: 5 plays, 69 yards, 2:10.

Fourth quarter

- DEN – Jason Elam 30-yard field goal, 10:07. Broncos 31–14. Drive: 9 play, 54 yards, 4:53.
- KC – Dante Hall 49-yard pass from Trent Green (Morten Andersen kick), 8:15. Broncos 31–21. Drive: 7 plays, 80 yards, 1:52.
- KC – Morten Andersen 21-yard field goal, 2:25. Broncos 31–24. Drive: 9 plays, 38 yards, 4:21.

Top passers

- KC – Trent Green – 18/42, 310 yards, 2 TD
- DEN – Brian Griese – 18/26, 297 yards, TD, INT

Top rushers

- KC – Priest Holmes – 18 rushes, 161 yards
- DEN – Clinton Portis – 21 rushes, 130 yards, 3 TD

Top receivers

- KC – Dante Hall – 5 receptions, 143 yards, 2 TD
- DEN – Rod Smith – 3 receptions, 83 yards

== Standings ==
AFC West
	W	L	T	PCT	DIV	CONF	PF	PA	STK
^{(1)} Oakland Raiders	11	5	0	.688	4–2	9–3	450	304	W2
Denver Broncos	9	7	0	.563	3–3	5–7	392	344	W1
San Diego Chargers	8	8	0	.500	3–3	6–6	333	367	L4
Kansas City Chiefs	8	8	0	.500	2–4	6–6	467	399	L1
