= 2004 Denver Broncos season =

American football team season

- Owner: Pat Bowlen
- General manager: Ted Sundquist and Mike Shanahan
- President: Pat Bowlen
- Head coach: Mike Shanahan
- Home stadium: Invesco Field at Mile High

Results
- Record: 10–6
- Division place: 2nd AFC West
- Playoffs: Lost Wild Card Playoffs (at Colts) 24–49
- Pro Bowlers: FS John Lynch; CB Champ Bailey

The 2004 Denver Broncos season was the franchise's 35th season in the National Football League (NFL) and the 45th overall. Under head coach Mike Shanahan the Broncos equalled their 10–6 record from 2003, and again finished second in the AFC West. In a repeat of 2003, the Broncos’ season ended in defeat to the Indianapolis Colts 49–24 in the AFC Wild Card playoffs.

Starting quarterback Jake Plummer finished the season with 4,089 passing yards (4th in the league). During the offseason, the Broncos traded running back Clinton Portis to the Washington Redskins in exchange for cornerback Champ Bailey.

It was the last time the Broncos qualified for the playoffs as a wild card team until 2024.

== Offseason ==
The Broncos acquired cornerback Champ Bailey in a trade with the Washington Redskins, sending running back Clinton Portis to Washington in return.

During the offseason, the Broncos failed to retain linebackers Keith Burns and Ian Gold. Both would sign with the Tampa Bay Buccaneers, but however, both players would return to the team in the following season. Also, the Broncos failed to retain defensive end Bertrand Berry, who would sign with the Arizona Cardinals as a free agent.

The Broncos also signed safety John Lynch as a free agent after he was released by the Tampa Bay Buccaneers.

=== NFL draft ===
2004 Denver Broncos draft
Round	Pick	Player	Position	College	Notes
1	17	D. J. Williams	Linebacker	Miami (FL)	from Cincinnati
2	41	Tatum Bell	Running back	Oklahoma State	from Washington
2	54	Darius Watts	Wide receiver	Marshall	
3	85	Jeremy LeSueur	Cornerback	Michigan	
5	152	Jeff Shoate	Cornerback	San Diego State	
6	171	Triandos Luke	Wide receiver	Alabama	
6	190	Josh Sewell	Center	Nebraska	
7	225	Matt Mauck	Quarterback	LSU	
7	247	Brandon Miree	Fullback	Pittsburgh	
7	250	Bradlee Van Pelt	Quarterback	Colorado State	
Made roster * Made at least one Pro Bowl during career

== Personnel ==
=== Staff / Coaches ===
2004 Denver Broncos staff
Front office: President and chief executive officer – Pat Bowlen; General manager – Ted Sundquist; Director of pro personnel – Rick Smith; Director of college scouting – Jim Goodman; Head coaches: Executive vice president of football operations/head coach – Mike Shanahan; Offensive coaches: Offensive coordinator – Gary Kubiak; Quarterbacks – Pat McPherson; Running backs – Bobby Turner; Wide receivers – Steve Watson; Tight ends – Brian Pariani; Offensive line – Rick Dennison; Offensive assistant/special teams – Troy Calhoun	Defensive coaches: Defensive coordinator – Larry Coyer; Defensive line – Jacob Burney; Assistant defensive line/pass rush specialist – Keith Millard; Defensive backs – David Gibbs; Assistant defensive backs – Jimmy Spencer; Defensive assistant/special teams – Kirk Doll; Special teams coaches: Special teams – Ronnie Bradford; Strength and conditioning: Strength and conditioning – Rich Tuten; Assistant strength and conditioning – Greg Saporta; Assistant strength and conditioning – Cedric Smith

=== Roster ===
2004 Denver Broncos roster
Quarterbacks (QB): 13 Danny Kanell; 16 Jake Plummer; Running backs (RB): 26 Tatum Bell; 34 Reuben Droughns; 39 Kyle Johnson FB; 27 Jonathan Reese; 37 Cecil Sapp FB; Wide receivers (WR): 81 Charlie Adams; 85 Ashley Lelie; 10 Triandos Luke; 80 Rod Smith; 17 Darius Watts; Tight ends (TE): 89 Dwayne Carswell; 86 Patrick Hape; 88 Jeb Putzier	Offensive linemen (OL): 69 P. J. Alexander C; 65 Cooper Carlisle G; 70 Tyson Clabo OT; 72 George Foster OT; 74 Cornell Green OT; 50 Ben Hamilton G; 78 Matt Lepsis OT; 66 Tom Nalen C; 62 Dan Neil G; 63 Tim Stuber G; Defensive linemen (DL): 92 Marco Coleman DE; 68 Mario Fatafehi DT; 98 Reggie Hayward DE; 61 Ellis Johnson DT; 99 Raylee Johnson DE; 95 Anton Palepoi DE; 75 Monsanto Pope DT; 93 Trevor Pryce DT; 97 Demetrin Veal DT	Linebackers (LB): 55 Patrick Chukwurah OLB; 53 Louis Green OLB; 58 Terry Pierce MLB; 59 Donnie Spragan OLB; 57 Jashon Sykes OLB; 52 D.J. Williams OLB; 56 Al Wilson MLB; Defensive backs (DB): 45 Roc Alexander CB; 24 Champ Bailey CB; 42 Sam Brandon FS; 25 Nick Ferguson FS; 31 Kelly Herndon CB; 28 Kenoy Kennedy SS; 47 John Lynch FS; 40 Jeff Shoate CB; 32 Chris Young SS; Special teams (ST): 6 Jason Baker P; 1 Jason Elam K; 83 Mike Leach LS	Practice squad: 30 Santonio Beard RB; 36 Curome Cox S; 3 Romar Crenshaw WR; 18 Grant Mattos WR; 8 Matt Mauck QB; 71 D.J. Renteria DE; 79 Josh Sewell C; 9 Bradlee Van Pelt QB; Reserve: 38 Mike Anderson FB (IR); 96 Dorsett Davis DT (IR); 94 Luther Elliss DT (IR); 22 Quentin Griffin RB (IR); 20 Garrison Hearst RB (IR); 14 Nate Jackson WR (IR); 12 B.J. Johnson WR (IR); 43 Jeremy LeSueur CB (IR); 23 Willie Middlebrooks CB (IR); 48 Brandon Miree FB (IR); 35 Lenny Walls CB (IR); Rookies in italics 53 active, 11 reserve, 8 practice squad

== Schedule ==
In addition to their regular home-and-away series with AFC West rivals the Raiders, the Chiefs and the Chargers, the Broncos played teams from the AFC South and NFC South as per the schedule rotation established in 2002, and also played intraconference games against the Miami Dolphins and the Cincinnati Bengals based on their common divisional position vis-à-vis the Broncos from 2003.

The Christmas Day game was the first occasion the Broncos had played the Titans since they were the Houston Oilers, whom they previously met in 1995. This is because between 1978 and 2002 non-divisional conference games were scheduled exclusively based upon the preceding season’s finish.

Week	Date	Opponent	Result	Record	Venue	Attendance
1	September 12	**Kansas City Chiefs**	**W** 34–24	1–0	Invesco Field at Mile High	75,939
2	September 19	at Jacksonville Jaguars	**L** 6–7	1–1	Alltel Stadium	69,127
3	September 26	**San Diego Chargers**	**W** 23–13	2–1	Invesco Field at Mile High	74,533
4	October 3	at Tampa Bay Buccaneers	**W** 16–13	3–1	Raymond James Stadium	65,341
5	October 10	Carolina Panthers	**W** 20–17	4–1	Invesco Field at Mile High	75,072
6	October 17	at **Oakland Raiders**	**W** 31–3	5–1	Network Associates Coliseum	57,293
7	October 25	at Cincinnati Bengals	**L** 10–23	5–2	Paul Brown Stadium	65,806
8	October 31	Atlanta Falcons	**L** 28–41	5–3	Invesco Field at Mile High	75,083
9	November 7	Houston Texans	**W** 31–13	6–3	Invesco Field at Mile High	74,292
10	Bye					
11	November 21	at New Orleans Saints	**W** 34–13	7–3	Louisiana Superdome	64,900
12	November 28	**Oakland Raiders**	**L** 24–25	7–4	Invesco Field at Mile High	75,936
13	December 5	at **San Diego Chargers**	**L** 17–20	7–5	Qualcomm Stadium	65,395
14	December 12	Miami Dolphins	**W** 20–17	8–5	Invesco Field at Mile High	75,027
15	December 19	at **Kansas City Chiefs**	**L** 17–45	8–6	Arrowhead Stadium	77,702
16	December 25	at Tennessee Titans	**W** 37–16	9–6	The Coliseum	68,809
17	January 2	Indianapolis Colts	**W** 33–14	10–6	Invesco Field at Mile High	75,149
Note: Intra-division opponents are in **bold** text.

== Playoffs ==
Week	Date	Opponent	Result	Record	Venue	Attendance
Wild Card	January 9, 2005	at Indianapolis Colts	L 24–49	0–1	RCA Dome	56,609

== Standings ==
AFC West
	W	L	T	PCT	DIV	CONF	PF	PA	STK
^{(4)} San Diego Chargers	12	4	0	.750	5–1	9–3	446	313	W1
^{(6)} Denver Broncos	10	6	0	.625	3–3	7–5	381	304	W2
Kansas City Chiefs	7	9	0	.438	3–3	6–6	483	435	L1
Oakland Raiders	5	11	0	.313	1–5	3–9	320	442	L2

AFC
#	Team	Division	W	L	T	PCT	DIV	CONF	SOS	SOV	STK
Division leaders
1	Pittsburgh Steelers	North	15	1	0	.938	5–1	11–1	.484	.479	W14
2	New England Patriots	East	14	2	0	.875	5–1	10–2	.492	.478	W2
3 (Note: Indianapolis clinched the AFC #3 seed instead of San Diego based upon head-to-head victory.)	Indianapolis Colts	South	12	4	0	.750	5–1	8–4	.500	.458	L1
4	San Diego Chargers	West	12	4	0	.750	5–1	9–3	.477	.411	W1
Wild cards
5 (Note: New York Jets clinched the AFC #5 seed instead of Denver based upon better record against common opponents (New York Jets were 5–0 to Denver’s 3–2 against San Diego, Cincinnati, Houston, and Miami).)	New York Jets	East	10	6	0	.625	3–3	7–5	.523	.406	L2
6	Denver Broncos	West	10	6	0	.625	3–3	7–5	.484	.450	W2
Did not qualify for the postseason
7 (Note: Jacksonville and Baltimore finished ahead of Buffalo because they each defeated Buffalo head-to-head.) (Note: Jacksonville finished ahead of Baltimore based upon better record against common opponents (Jacksonville were 3–2 against Baltimore’s 2–3 versus Pittsburgh, Indianapolis, Buffalo and Kansas City).)	Jacksonville Jaguars	South	9	7	0	.563	2–4	6–6	.527	.479	W1
8	Baltimore Ravens	North	9	7	0	.563	3–3	6–6	.551	.472	W1
9	Buffalo Bills	East	9	7	0	.563	3–3	5–7	.512	.382	L1
10	Cincinnati Bengals	North	8	8	0	.500	2–4	4–8	.543	.453	W2
11 (Note: Houston finished ahead of Kansas City based upon head-to-head victory.)	Houston Texans	South	7	9	0	.438	4–2	6–6	.504	.402	L1
12	Kansas City Chiefs	West	7	9	0	.438	3–3	6–6	.551	.509	L1
13 (Note: Oakland finished ahead of Tennessee based upon head-to-head victory.)	Oakland Raiders	West	5	11	0	.313	1–5	3–9	.570	.450	L2
14	Tennessee Titans	South	5	11	0	.313	1–5	3–9	.512	.463	W1
15 (Note: Miami finished ahead of Cleveland based upon head-to-head victory.)	Miami Dolphins	East	4	12	0	.250	1–5	2–10	.555	.438	L1
16	Cleveland Browns	North	4	12	0	.250	1–5	3–9	.590	.469	W1
Tiebreakers (Note: When breaking ties for three or more teams under the NFL's rules, they are first broken within divisions, then comparing only the highest-ranked remaining team from each division.)
