= 2003 Denver Broncos season =

American football team season

- Owner: Pat Bowlen
- General manager: Ted Sundquist and Mike Shanahan
- President: Pat Bowlen
- Head coach: Mike Shanahan
- Home stadium: Invesco Field at Mile High

Results
- Record: 10–6
- Division place: 2nd AFC West
- Playoffs: Lost Wild Card Playoffs (at Colts) 10–41
- All-Pros: C Tom Nalen (1st team)
- Pro Bowlers: RB Clinton Portis; C Tom Nalen; ILB Al Wilson

The 2003 Denver Broncos season was the franchise's 34th season in the National Football League (NFL) and the 44th overall.

After the departure of Brian Griese, who signed with his father's team, the Dolphins, the Broncos acquired Jake Plummer, who had been struggling in recent years with Arizona.

After two seasons of mediocrity, the Broncos rebounded with a 10–6 record. They also earned their first playoff berth since 2000. But Denver's season ended with a 41–10 blowout to the Indianapolis Colts in the Wild Card round. Following the season, Clinton Portis was traded to the Washington Redskins, and Shannon Sharpe and Ed McCaffrey both retired.

== Offseason ==
=== NFL draft ===
2003 Denver Broncos draft
Round	Pick	Player	Position	College	Notes
1	20	George Foster	Offensive tackle	Georgia	
2	51	Terry Pierce	Linebacker	Kansas State	
4	108	Quentin Griffin	Running back	Oklahoma	from Carolina (Note: #108: Carolina → Denver (D). see #82: Denver → Carolina)
4	114	Nick Eason	Defensive tackle	Clemson	
4	128	Bryant McNeal	Defensive end	Clemson	
5	157	Ben Claxton	Center	Ole Miss	from New England (Note: #157: New England → Denver (D). see #120: Denver → New England.)
5	158	Adrian Madise	Wide receiver	TCU	
6	194	Aaron Hunt	Defensive end	Texas Tech	
7	227	Clint Mitchell	Defensive end	Florida	from Carolina (Note: #227: Carolina → Denver (D). see #82: Denver → Carolina)
7	235	Ahmaad Galloway	Running back	Alabama	
Made roster * Made at least one Pro Bowl during career

== Personnel ==
=== Staff / Coaches ===
2003 Denver Broncos staff
Front office: President and chief executive officer – Pat Bowlen; General manager – Ted Sundquist; Director of pro personnel – Rick Smith; Director of college scouting – Jim Goodman; Head coaches: Executive vice president of football operations/head coach – Mike Shanahan; Assistant head coach/offensive line – Alex Gibbs; Offensive coaches: Offensive coordinator – Gary Kubiak; Quarterbacks – Pat McPherson; Running backs – Bobby Turner; Wide receivers – Steve Watson; Tight ends – Brian Pariani; Offensive line – Rick Dennison	Defensive coaches: Defensive coordinator – Larry Coyer; Defensive line – Jacob Burney; Assistant defensive line/pass rush specialist – Keith Millard; Defensive backs – David Gibbs; Assistant defensive backs – Jimmy Spencer; Defensive assistant – Troy Calhoun; Special teams coaches: Special teams – Frank Bush; Special teams assistant – Ronnie Bradford; Strength and conditioning: Strength and conditioning – Rich Tuten; Assistant strength and conditioning – Greg Saporta; Assistant strength and conditioning – Cedric Smith

=== Roster ===
2003 Denver Broncos roster
Quarterbacks (QB): 17 Jarious Jackson; 13 Danny Kanell; 16 Jake Plummer; Running backs (RB): 38 Mike Anderson; 34 Reuben Droughns KR; 22 Quentin Griffin; 26 Clinton Portis; 37 Cecil Sapp; Wide receivers (WR): 12 Charlie Adams; 14 Nate Jackson; 85 Ashley Lelie; 82 Adrian Madise KR; 87 Ed McCaffrey; 80 Rod Smith; Tight ends (TE): 89 Dwayne Carswell; 86 Patrick Hape; 88 Jeb Putzier; 84 Shannon Sharpe	Offensive linemen (OL): 69 P. J. Alexander C/G; 71 Blake Brockermeyer T; 65 Cooper Carlisle G; 72 George Foster T; 50 Ben Hamilton G; 79 Steve Herndon G; 78 Matt Lepsis T; 66 Tom Nalen C; 62 Dan Neil G; 74 Ephraim Salaam T; Defensive linemen (DL): 92 Bertrand Berry DE; 96 Dorsett Davis DE/DT; 68 Mario Fatafehi DT; 98 Reggie Hayward DE; 90 Darius Holland DT; 75 Monsanto Pope DT; 93 Trevor Pryce DE/DT	Linebackers (LB): 55 Keith Burns MLB; 53 Johnny Rutledge OLB; 59 Donnie Spragan OLB; 57 Jashon Sykes OLB; 56 Al Wilson MLB; Defensive backs (DB): 42 Sam Brandon FS; 31 Kelly Herndon CB; 28 Kenoy Kennedy SS; 47 Ryan McNeil CB; 23 Willie Middlebrooks CB/SS; 24 Deltha O'Neal CB/KR/PR; 35 Lenny Walls CB; 33 Jimmy Spencer CB; 21 Scott Turner CB; 32 Chris Young FS; Special teams (ST): 1 Jason Elam K; 4 Micah Knorr P; 83 Mike Leach LS	Practice squad: 19 Atnaf Harris WR; 39 Kyle Johnson RB; 67 Chris Watton G; Reserve: 11 Steve Beuerlein QB (IR); 81 Chris Cole WR/KR (IR); 97 Nick Eason DT (IR); 25 Nick Ferguson S (IR); 27 Ahmaad Galloway RB (IR); 99 Daryl Gardener DT (NF-Ill.); 52 Ian Gold LB (IR); 91 Bryant McNeal DE (IR); 95 Clint Mitchell DE (IR); 51 John Mobley LB (IR); 58 Terry Pierce LB (IR); Rookies in italics 53 active, 11 reserve, 3 practice squad

== Regular season ==
=== Schedule ===
Week	Date	Opponent	Result	Record	Venue	Attendance
1	September 7	at Cincinnati Bengals	W 30–10	1–0	Paul Brown Stadium	63,820
2	September 14	at San Diego Chargers	W 37–13	2–0	Qualcomm Stadium	65,445
3	September 22	Oakland Raiders	W 31–10	3–0	Invesco Field at Mile High	76,753
4	September 28	Detroit Lions	W 20–16	4–0	Invesco Field at Mile High	75,719
5	October 5	at Kansas City Chiefs	L 23–24	4–1	Arrowhead Stadium	78,903
6	October 12	Pittsburgh Steelers	W 17–14	5–1	Invesco Field at Mile High	75,974
7	October 19	at Minnesota Vikings	L 20–28	5–2	Hubert H. Humphrey Metrodome	64,381
8	October 26	at Baltimore Ravens	L 6–26	5–3	M&T Bank Stadium	69,721
9	November 3	New England Patriots	L 26–30	5–4	Invesco Field at Mile High	76,203
10	Bye					
11	November 16	San Diego Chargers	W 37–8	6–4	Invesco Field at Mile High	75,217
12	November 23	Chicago Bears	L 10–19	6–5	Invesco Field at Mile High	75,540
13	November 30	at Oakland Raiders	W 22–8	7–5	Network Associates Coliseum	57,201
14	December 7	Kansas City Chiefs	W 45–27	8–5	Invesco Field at Mile High	76,403
15	December 14	Cleveland Browns	W 23–20 (OT)	9–5	Invesco Field at Mile High	75,358
16	December 21	at Indianapolis Colts	W 31–17	10–5	RCA Dome	57,149
17	December 28	at Green Bay Packers	L 3–31	10–6	Lambeau Field	70,299

=== Game summaries ===
==== Week 1 ====
Week 1: Denver Broncos at Cincinnati Bengals

Quarter	1	2	3	4	Total
Broncos	3	17	7	3	30
Bengals	0	3	0	7	10

at Paul Brown Stadium, Cincinnati, Ohio

- Game time: 1:00 p.m. EDT/11:00 a.m. MDT
- Game weather: 72 °F (22 °C), Partly Cloudy & Fair
- Game attendance: 63,820
- Referee: Gerry Austin
- TV announcers (CBS): Don Criqui and Steve Tasker
- Recap, Game Book

Game information

First quarter

- DEN – Jason Elam 51-yard field goal, 9:04. Broncos 3–0. Drive: 7 plays, 27 yards, 3:55.

Second quarter

- DEN – Clinton Portis 2-yard run (Jason Elam kick), 10:54. Broncos 10–0. Drive: 8 plays, 46 yards, 3:51.
- CIN – Shayne Graham 26-yard field goal, 3:13. Broncos 10–3. Drive: 10 plays, 45 yards, 5:57.
- DEN – Clinton Portis 8-yard run (Jason Elam kick), 1:13. Broncos 17–3. Drive: 5 plays, 66 yards, 2:00.
- DEN – Jason Elam 27-yard field goal, 0:11. Broncos 20–3. Drive: 7 plays, 20 yards, 0:56.

Third quarter

- DEN – Ian Gold 12-yard interception return (Jason Elam kick), 10:18. Broncos 27–3.

Fourth quarter

- DEN – Jason Elam 39-yard field goal, 4:16. Broncos 30–3. Drive: 8 plays, 29 yards, 4:00.
- CIN – Chad Johnson 41-yard pass from Jon Kitna (Shayne Graham kick), 3:04. Broncos 30–10. Drive: 4 plays, 75 yards, 1:12.

Top passers

- DEN – Jake Plummer – 12/25, 115 yards, 3 INT
- CIN – Jon Kitna – 20/37, 264 yards, TD, 2 INT

Top rushers

- DEN – Clinton Portis – 24 rushes, 120 yards, 2 TD
- CIN – Corey Dillon – 14 rushes, 34 yards

Top receivers

- DEN – Rod Smith – 5 receptions, 43 yards
- CIN – Chad Johnson – 6 receptions, 95 yards, TD

==== Week 2 ====
Week 2: Denver Broncos at San Diego Chargers

Quarter	1	2	3	4	Total
Broncos	14	10	10	3	37
Chargers	3	7	3	0	13

at Qualcomm Stadium, San Diego, California

- Game time: 2:15 p.m. MDT/1:15 p.m. PDT
- Game weather: 73 °F (23 °C), Clear and Sunny
- Game attendance: 65,445
- Referee: Tony Corrente
- TV announcers (CBS): Gus Johnson, Brent Jones, and Scott Kaplan
- Recap, Game Book

Game information

First quarter

- DEN – Reuben Droughns 12-yard pass from Jake Plummer (Jason Elam kick), 12:18. Broncos 7–0. Drive: 7 plays, 69 yards, 2:42.
- SD – Steve Christie 19-yard field goal, 6:21. Broncos 7–3. Drive: 9 plays, 58 yards, 5:57.
- DEN – Shannon Sharpe 1-yard pass from Jake Plummer (Jason Elam kick), 1:36. Broncos 14–3. Drive: 7 plays, 88 yards, 4:45.

Second quarter

- DEN – Cooper Carlisle 6-yard pass from Jake Plummer (Jason Elam kick), 6:58. Broncos 21–3 Drive: 10 plays, 54 yards, 6:01.
- SD – Eric Parker 23-yard pass from Drew Brees (Steve Christie kick), 1:05. Broncos 21–10. Drive: 12 plays, 80 yards, 5:53.
- DEN – Jason Elam 30-yard field goal, 0:05. Broncos 24–10. Drive: 8 plays, 56 yards, 1:00.

Third quarter

- SD – Steve Christie 25-yard field goal, 9:31. Broncos 24–13. Drive: 11 plays, 67 yards, 5:29.
- DEN – Mike Anderson 1-yard run (Jason Elam kick), 4:48. Broncos 31–13. Drive: 7 plays, 51 yards, 4:43.
- DEN – Jason Elam 45-yard field goal, 1:05. Broncos 34–13. Drive: 6 plays, 18 yards, 2:16.

Fourth quarter

- DEN – Jason Elam 34-yard field goal, 14:21. Broncos 37–13. Drive: 4 plays, 8 yards, 1:26.

Top passers

- DEN – Jake Plummer – 9/13, 94 yards, 3 TD
- SD – Drew Brees – 20/41, 182 yards, TD, INT

Top rushers

- DEN – Clinton Portis – 12 rushes, 129 yards
- SD – LaDainian Tomlinson – 16 rushes, 93 yards

Top receivers

- DEN – Rod Smith – 5 receptions, 71 yards
- SD – Eric Parker – 5 receptions, 59 yards, TD

==== Week 3 ====
Week 3: Oakland Raiders at Denver Broncos

Quarter	1	2	3	4	Total
Raiders	0	0	7	3	10
Broncos	21	3	7	0	31

at Invesco Field at Mile High, Denver, Colorado

- Game time: 7:00 p.m. MDT
- Game weather: 72 °F (22 °C), Clear
- Game attendance: 76,753
- Referee: Larry Nemmers
- TV announcers (ABC): Al Michaels, John Madden and Lisa Guerrero
- Recap, Game Book

Game information

First quarter

- DEN – Shannon Sharpe 18-yard pass from Jake Plummer (Jason Elam kick), 9:28. Broncos 7–0. Drive: 7 plays, 60 yards, 4:03.
- DEN – Ashley Lelie 44-yard pass from Jake Plummer (Jason Elam kick), 4:14. Broncos 14–0. Drive: 6 plays, 55 yards, 2:51.
- DEN – Jake Plummer 6-yard run (Jason Elam kick), 0:54. Broncos 21–0. Drive: 4 plays, 50 yards, 2:23.

Second quarter

- DEN – Jason Elam 20-yard field goal, 2:28. Broncos 24–0. Drive: 12 plays, 78 yards, 6:14.

Third quarter

- DEN – Mike Anderson 1-yard run (Jason Elam kick), 12:11. Broncos 31–0. Drive: 6 plays, 80 yards, 2:49.
- OAK – Zack Crockett 4-yard run (Sebastian Janikowski kick), 5:21. Broncos 31–7. Drive: 13 plays, 80 yards, 6:50.

Fourth quarter

- OAK – Sebastian Janikowski 41-yard field goal, 12:26. Broncos 31–10. Drive: 4 plays, -2 yards, 0:53.

Top passers

- OAK – Rich Gannon – 14/29, 149 yards
- DEN – Jake Plummer – 14/21, 197 yards, 2 TD

Top rushers

- OAK – Tyrone Wheatley – 5 rushes, 16 yards
- DEN – Mike Anderson – 14 rushes, 70 yards, TD

Top receivers

- OAK – Jerry Rice – 4 receptions, 61 yards
- DEN – Ashley Lelie – 3 receptions, 108 yards, TD

==== Week 4 ====
Week 4: Detroit Lions at Denver Broncos

Quarter	1	2	3	4	Total
Lions	7	3	0	6	16
Broncos	7	7	3	3	20

at Invesco Field at Mile High, Denver, Colorado

- Game time: 2:15 p.m. MDT
- Game weather: 66 °F (19 °C), Clear/Sunny
- Game attendance: 75,519
- Referee: Ron Blum
- TV announcers (Fox): Sam Rosen and Bill Maas
- Recap, Game Book

Game information

First quarter

- DET – Charles Rogers 33-yard pass from Joey Harrington (Jason Hanson kick), 7:07. Lions 7–0. Drive: 5 plays, 73 yards, 3:01.
- DEN – Ashley Lelie 29-yard pass from Jake Plummer (Jason Elam kick), 1:56. Tied 7–7. Drive: 9 plays, 80 yards, 5:11.

Second quarter

- DEN – Shannon Sharpe 1-yard pass from Jake Plummer (Jason Elam kick), 10:36. Broncos 14–7. Drive: 8 plays, 56 yards, 4:41.
- DET – Jason Hanson 53-yard field goal, 6:00. Broncos 14–10. Drive: 10 plays, 45 yards, 4:36.

Third quarter

- DEN – Jason Elam 37-yard field goal, 1:17. Broncos 17–10. Drive: 9 plays, 57 yards, 4:43.

Fourth quarter

- DET – Scotty Anderson 43-yard pass from Joey Harrington (kick short), 13:36. Broncos 17–16. Drive: 7 plays, 70 yards, 2:41.
- DEN – Jason Elam 41-yard field goal, 3:13. Broncos 20–16. Drive: 10 plays, 57 yards, 4:29.

Top passers

- DET – Joey Harrington – 15/33, 149 yards, 2 TD
- DEN – Jake Plummer – 25/34, 277 yards, 2 TD

Top rushers

- DET – Shawn Bryson – 13 rushes, 73 yards
- DEN – Jake Plummer – 6 rushes, 40 yards

Top receivers

- DET – Charles Rogers – 4 receptions, 62 yards, TD
- DEN – Shannon Sharpe – 7 receptions, 74 yards, TD

==== Week 5 ====
Week 5: Denver Broncos at Kansas City Chiefs

Quarter	1	2	3	4	Total
Broncos	7	6	7	3	23
Chiefs	7	3	7	7	24

at Arrowhead Stadium, Kansas City, Missouri

- Game time: 12:00 p.m. CDT/11:00 a.m. MDT
- Game weather: 69 °F (21 °C), Clear
- Game attendance: 78,903
- Referee: Bill Leavy
- TV announcers (CBS): Kevin Harlan and Randy Cross
- Recap, Game Book

Game information

First quarter

- DEN – Dwayne Carswell 6-yard pass from Jake Plummer (Jason Elam kick), 5:16. Broncos 7–0. Drive: 3 plays, 80 yards, 1:21.
- KC – Tony Gonzalez 20-yard pass from Trent Green (Morten Andersen kick), 3:08. Tied 7–7. Drive: 3 plays, 25 yards, 0:54.

Second quarter

- DEN – Jason Elam 48-yard field goal, 12:28. Broncos 10–7. Drive: 8 plays, 17 yards, 3:17.
- KC – Morten Andersen 23-yard field goal, 5:54. Tied 10–10. Drive: 13 plays, 71 yards, 6:34.
- DEN – Jason Elam 29-yard field goal, 0:05. Broncos 13–10. Drive: 10 plays, 62 yards, 1:16.

Third quarter

- DEN – Clinton Portis 65-yard run (Jason Elam kick), 13:30. Broncos 20–10. Drive: 3 plays, 74 yards, 1:30.
- KC – Johnnie Morton 28-yard pass from Trent Green (Morten Andersen kick), 10:49. Broncos 20–17. Drive: 5 plays, 77 yards, 2:41.

Fourth quarter

- DEN – Jason Elam 21-yard field goal, 13:42. Broncos 23–17. Drive: 15 plays, 68 yards, 7:41.
- KC – Dante Hall 93-yard kickoff return (Morten Andersen kick), 8:20. Chiefs 24–23.

Top passers

- DEN – Jake Plummer – 20/38, 220 yards, TD
- KC – Trent Green – 15/28, 129 yards, 2 TD, INT

Top rushers

- DEN – Clinton Portis – 23 rushes, 141 yards, TD
- KC – Priest Holmes – 17 rushes, 97 yards

Top receivers

- DEN – Rod Smith – 8 receptions, 130 yards
- KC – Tony Gonzalez – 3 receptions, 47 yards, TD

==== Week 6 ====
Week 6: Pittsburgh Steelers at Denver Broncos

Quarter	1	2	3	4	Total
Steelers	3	3	0	8	14
Broncos	0	7	0	10	17

at Invesco Field at Mile High, Denver, Colorado

- Game time: 2:15 p.m. MDT
- Game weather: 73 °F (23 °C), Sunny
- Game attendance: 75,974
- Referee: Mike Carey
- TV announcers (CBS): Greg Gumbel, Phil Simms and Armen Keteyian
- Recap, Game Book

Game information

First quarter

- PIT – Jeff Reed 24-yard field goal, 9:00. Steelers 3–0. Drive: 4 plays, 4 yards, 1:32.

Second quarter

- DEN – Shannon Sharpe 10-yard pass from Steve Beuerlein (Jason Elam kick), 12:09. Broncos 7–3. Drive: 8 plays, 64 yards, 4:31.
- PIT – Jeff Reed 26-yard field goal, 6:15. Broncos 7–6. Drive: 4 plays, 11 yards, 1:40.

Third quarter

- No scoring plays

Fourth quarter

- DEN – Rod Smith 11-yard pass from Steve Beuerlein (Jason Elam kick), 9:22. Broncos 14–6. Drive: 4 plays, 52 yards, 2:01.
- PIT – Jerome Bettis 1-yard run (Jerome Bettis run), 2:41. Tied 14–14. Drive: 13 plays, 74 yards, 6:41.
- DEN – Jason Elam 47-yard field goal, 0:00. Broncos 17–14. Drive: 10 plays, 51 yards, 2:41.

Top passers

- PIT – Tommy Maddox – 19/30, 182 yards
- DEN – Steve Beuerlein – 17/28, 172 yards, 2 TD, 2 INT

Top rushers

- PIT – Jerome Bettis – 14 rushes, 34 yards, TD
- DEN – Clinton Portis – 15 rushes, 47 yards

Top receivers

- PIT – Hines Ward – 8 receptions, 81 yards
- DEN – Rod Smith – 4 receptions, 70 yards, TD

==== Week 7 ====
Week 7: Denver Broncos at Minnesota Vikings

Quarter	1	2	3	4	Total
Broncos	0	7	3	10	20
Vikings	7	7	14	0	28

at Hubert H. Humphrey Metrodome, Minneapolis, Minnesota

- Game time: 12:00 p.m. CDT/11:00 a.m. MDT
- Game weather: Game played indoors (Domed stadium)
- Game attendance: 64,381
- Referee: Bill Carollo
- TV announcers (CBS): Greg Gumbel, Phil Simms and Armen Keteyian
- Recap, Game Book

Game information

First quarter

- MIN – Kelly Campbell 47-yard pass from Daunte Culpepper (Aaron Elling kick), 6:10. Vikings 7–0. Drive: 7 plays, 77 yards, 3:33.

Second quarter

- DEN – Clinton Portis 4-yard run (Jason Elam kick), 1:51. Tied 7–7. Drive: 9 plays, 83 yards, 5:16.
- MIN – Moe Williams 59-yard pass from Daunte Culpepper (Aaron Elling kick), 0:00. Vikings 14–7. Drive: 6 plays, 81 yards, 1:51.

Third quarter

- MIN – Onterrio Smith 5-yard run (Aaron Elling kick), 9:24. Vikings 21–7. Drive: 10 plays, 71 yards, 5:36.
- MIN – Lance Johnstone 33-yard interception return (Aaron Elling kick), 7:57. Vikings 28–7.
- DEN – Jason Elam 46-yard field goal, 5:20. Vikings 28–10. Drive: 8 plays, 48 yards, 2:37.

Fourth quarter

- DEN – Jason Elam 46-yard field goal, 14:17. Vikings 28–13. Drive: 10 plays, 35 yards, 4:14.
- DEN – Mike Anderson 1-yard run pass from Danny Kanell (Jason Elam kick), 6:45. Vikings 28–20. Drive: 12 plays, 61 yards, 4:38.

Top passers

- DEN – Danny Kanell – 12/18, 104 yards, TD
- MIN – Daunte Culpepper – 19/26, 277 yards, 2 TD

Top rushers

- DEN – Clinton Portis – 25 rushes, 117 yards, TD
- MIN – Moe Williams – 14 rushes, 42 yards

Top receivers

- DEN – Shannon Sharpe – 7 receptions, 79 yards
- MIN – Randy Moss – 10 receptions, 151 yards

==== Week 8 ====
Week 8: Denver Broncos at Baltimore Ravens

Quarter	1	2	3	4	Total
Broncos	3	0	3	0	6
Ravens	0	9	0	17	26

at M&T Bank Stadium, Baltimore, Maryland

- Game time: 1:00 p.m. EST/11:00 a.m. MST
- Game weather: 67 °F (19 °C), Mostly Cloudy
- Game attendance: 69,721
- Referee: Ron Winter
- TV announcers (CBS): Kevin Harlan and Randy Cross
- Recap, Game Book

Game information

First quarter

- DEN – Jason Elam 28-yard field goal, 5:31. Broncos 3–0. Drive: 9 plays, 55 yards, 4:48.

Second quarter

- BAL – Matt Stover 25-yard field goal, 10:40. Tied 3–3. Drive: 11 plays, 41 yards, 5:27.
- BAL – Matt Stover 39-yard field goal, 7:41. Ravens 6–3. Drive: 7 plays, 19 yards, 2:01.
- BAL – Matt Stover 22-yard field goal, 0:00. Ravens 9–3. Drive: 14 plays, 55 yards, 6:06.

Third quarter

- DEN – Jason Elam 22-yard field goal, 7:10. Ravens 9–6. Drive: 11 plays, 58 yards, 5:48.

Fourth quarter

- BAL – Terry Jones 5-yard pass from Kyle Boller (Matt Stover kick), 7:35. Ravens 16–6. Drive: 4 plays, 20 yards, 2:05.
- BAL – Matt Stover 29-yard field goal, 3:00. Ravens 19–6. Drive: 4 plays, 3 yards, 1:03.
- BAL – Jamal Lewis 28-yard run (Matt Stover kick), 1:56. Ravens 26–6. Drive: 1 play, 28 yards, 0:07.

Top passers

- DEN – Danny Kanell – 16/31, 114 yards, 2 INT
- BAL – Kyle Boller – 15/27, 137 yards, TD

Top rushers

- DEN – Clinton Portis – 22 rushes, 86 yards
- BAL – Jamal Lewis – 32 rushes, 134 yards, TD

Top receivers

- DEN – Clinton Portis – 6 receptions, 29 yards
- BAL – Todd Heap – 3 receptions, 54 yards

==== Week 9 ====
Week 9: New England Patriots at Denver Broncos

Quarter	1	2	3	4	Total
Patriots	7	6	7	10	30
Broncos	7	10	7	2	26

at Invesco Field at Mile High, Denver, Colorado

- Game time: 7:00 p.m. MST
- Game weather: 35 °F (2 °C), foggy
- Game attendance: 76,203
- Referee: Pete Morelli
- TV announcers (ABC): Al Michaels, John Madden and Lisa Guerrero
- Recap, Game Book

Game information

First quarter

- DEN – Clinton Portis 15-yard run (Jason Elam kick), 10:51. Broncos 7–0. Drive: 4 plays, 28 yards, 1:55.
- NE – Deion Branch 66-yard pass from Tom Brady (Adam Vinatieri kick), 5:55. Tied 7–7. Drive: 1 play, 66 yards, 0:09.

Second quarter

- DEN – Jason Elam 43-yard field goal, 11:29. Broncos 10–7. Drive: 5 plays, 17 yards, 1:38.
- NE – Adam Vinatieri 40-yard field goal, 7:57. Tied 10–10. Drive: 7 plays, 58 yards, 3:32.
- DEN – Mike Anderson 1-yard pass from Danny Kanell (Micah Knorr kick), 0:24. Broncos 17–10. Drive: 14 plays, 72 yards, 7:33.
- NE – Adam Vinatieri 46-yard field goal, 0:01. Broncos 17–13. Drive: 2 plays, 8 yards, 0:23.

Third quarter

- NE – Daniel Graham 6-yard pass from Tom Brady (Adam Vinatieri kick), 5:57. Patriots 20–17. Drive: 8 plays, 56 yards, 3:46.
- DEN – Deltha O'Neal 57-yard punt return (Micah Knorr kick), 3:13. Broncos 24–20.

Fourth quarter

- NE – Adam Vinatieri 28-yard field goal, 11:08. Broncos 24–23. Drive: 11 plays, 59 yards, 7:05.
- DEN – Lonie Paxton fumble out of bounds in the end zone for a Safety, 2:49. Broncos 26–23
- NE – David Givens 18-yard pass from Tom Brady (Adam Vinatieri kick), 0:30. Patriots 30–26. Drive: 6 plays, 58 yards, 1:45.

Top passers

- NE – Tom Brady – 20/35, 350 yards, 3 TD, INT
- DEN – Danny Kanell – 16/35, 163 yards, TD, INT

Top rushers

- NE – Antowain Smith – 17 rushes, 55 yards
- DEN – Clinton Portis – 26 rushes, 111 yards, TD

Top receivers

- NE – Deion Branch – 3 receptions, 107 yards, TD
- DEN – Rod Smith – 4 receptions, 58 yards

==== Week 11 ====
Week 11: San Diego Chargers at Denver Broncos

Quarter	1	2	3	4	Total
Chargers	0	0	0	8	8
Broncos	10	17	7	3	37

at Invesco Field at Mile High, Denver, Colorado

- Game time: 2:00 p.m. MDT
- Game weather: 52 °F (11 °C), Mostly Cloudy
- Game attendance: 75,217
- Referee: Larry Nemmers
- TV announcers (CBS): Ian Eagle and Solomon Wilcots
- Recap, Game Book

Game information

First quarter

- DEN – Shannon Sharpe 11-yard pass from Jake Plummer (Jason Elam kick), 13:06. Broncos 7–0. Drive: 2 plays, 11 yards, 0:11.
- DEN – Jason Elam 42-yard field goal, 6:14. Broncos 10–0. Drive: 11 plays, 31 yards, 5:07.

Second quarter

- DEN – Jason Elam 22-yard field goal, 9:46. Broncos 13–0. Drive: 15 plays, 86 yards, 8:13.
- DEN – Rod Smith 65-yard punt return (Jason Elam kick), 8:25. Broncos 20–0.
- DEN – Shannon Sharpe 26-yard pass from Jake Plummer (Jason Elam kick), 0:32. Broncos 27–0. Drive: 5 plays, 55 yards, 0:50.

Third quarter

- DEN – Shannon Sharpe 26-yard pass from Jake Plummer (Jason Elam kick), 1:28. Broncos 34–0. Drive: 8 plays, 85 yards, 4:44.

Fourth quarter

- DEN – Micah Knorr 27-yard field goal, 13:11. Broncos 37–0. Drive: 7 plays, 19 yards, 2:49.
- SD – Kassim Osgood 19-yard pass from Doug Flutie (Doug Flutie–Stephen Alexander pass), 10:12. Broncos 37–8. Drive: 8 plays, 67 yards, 2:59.

Top passers

- SD – Doug Flutie – 9/25, 70 yards, TD, INT
- DEN – Jake Plummer – 23/34, 253 yards, 3 TD, INT

Top rushers

- SD – LaDainian Tomlinson – 8 rushes, 29 yards
- DEN – Clinton Portis – 25 rushes, 106 yards

Top receivers

- SD – LaDainian Tomlinson – 4 receptions, 16 yards
- DEN – Shannon Sharpe – 7 receptions, 101 yards, 3 TD

==== Week 12 ====
Week 12: Chicago Bears at Denver Broncos

Quarter	1	2	3	4	Total
Bears	3	6	0	10	19
Broncos	7	0	3	0	10

at Invesco Field at Mile High, Denver, Colorado

- Game time: 2:00 p.m. MDT
- Game weather: 18 °F (−8 °C), Sunny
- Game attendance: 75,540
- Referee: Bill Leavy
- TV announcers (Fox): Kenny Albert and Brian Baldinger
- Recap, Game Book

Game information

First quarter

- DEN – Rod Smith 1-yard pass from Jake Plummer (Jason Elam kick), 3:59. Broncos 7–0. Drive: 12 plays, 78 yards, 7:31.
- CHI – Paul Edinger 33-yard field goal, 1:31. Broncos 7–3. Drive: 6 plays, 30 yards, 2:28.

Second quarter

- CHI – Paul Edinger 23-yard field goal, 1:57. Broncos 7–6. Drive: 7 plays, 65 yards, 3:31.
- CHI – Paul Edinger 54-yard field goal, 0:03. Bears 9–7. Drive: 6 plays, 30 yards, 0:54.

Third quarter

- DEN – Jason Elam 25-yard field goal, 11:41. Broncos 10–9. Drive: 8 plays, 73 yards, 3:19.

Fourth quarter

- CHI – Kordell Stewart 1-yard run (Paul Edinger kick), 12:45. Bears 16–10. Drive: 15 plays, 55 yards, 8:38.
- CHI – Paul Edinger 47-yard field goal, 8:46. Bears 19–10. Drive: 7 plays, 32 yards, 2:27.

Top passers

- CHI – Chris Chandler – 8/18, 79 yards
- DEN – Jake Plummer – 19/35, 176 yards, TD

Top rushers

- CHI – Anthony Thomas – 21 rushes, 60 yards
- DEN – Clinton Portis – 14 rushes, 165 yards

Top receivers

- CHI – Marty Booker – 4 receptions, 43 yards
- DEN – Rod Smith – 9 receptions, 86 yards, TD

==== Week 13 ====
Week 13: Denver Broncos at Oakland Raiders

Quarter	1	2	3	4	Total
Broncos	0	14	0	8	22
Raiders	5	3	0	0	8

at Network Associates Coliseum, Oakland, California

- Game time: 2:15 p.m. MST/1:15 p.m. PST
- Game weather: 55 °F (13 °C), Light Rain
- Game attendance: 57,201
- Referee: Ron Blum
- TV announcers (CBS): Kevin Harlan and Randy Cross
- Recap, Game Book

Game information

First quarter

- OAK – Punt blocked by O. J. Santiago out of bounds in the end zone for a safety, 7:49. Raiders 2–0
- OAK – Sebastian Janikowski 46-yard field goal, 4:36. Raiders 5–0. Drive: 8 plays, 34 yards, 3:13.

Second quarter

- DEN – Shannon Sharpe 4-yard pass from Jake Plummer (Jason Elam kick), 11:00. Broncos 7–5. Drive: 13 plays, 65 yards, 8:36.
- OAK – Sebastian Janikowski 48-yard field goal, 9:03. Raiders 8–7. Drive: 5 plays, 47 yards, 1:57.
- DEN – Clinton Portis 1-yard run (Jason Elam kick), 4:24. Broncos 14–8. Drive: 9 plays, 60 yards, 4:39.

Third quarter

- No scoring plays

Fourth quarter

- DEN – Clinton Portis 1-yard run (Clinton Portis run), 3:15. Broncos 22–8. Drive: 10 plays, 68 yards, 6:04.

Top passers

- DEN – Jake Plummer – 11/20, 105 yards, TD, INT
- OAK – Rick Mirer – 13/30, 153 yards

Top rushers

- DEN – Clinton Portis – 34 rushes, 170 yards, 2 TD
- OAK – Tyrone Wheatley – 8 rushes, 85 yards

Top receivers

- DEN – Ed McCaffrey – 4 receptions, 39 yards
- OAK – Jerry Porter – 3 receptions, 49 yards

==== Week 14 ====
Week 14: Kansas City Chiefs at Denver Broncos

Quarter	1	2	3	4	Total
Chiefs	7	14	0	6	27
Broncos	7	10	14	14	45

at Invesco Field at Mile High, Denver, Colorado

- Game time: 2:15 p.m. MST
- Game weather: 63 °F (17 °C), Partly Cloudy
- Game attendance: 76,403
- Referee: Tony Corrente
- TV announcers (CBS): Greg Gumbel, Phil Simms and Armen Keteyian
- Recap, Game Book

Game information

First quarter

- DEN – Clinton Portis 11-yard run (Jason Elam kick), 9:24. Broncos 7–0. Drive: 10 plays, 74 yards, 5:36.
- KC – Priest Holmes 2-yard run (Morten Andersen kick), 3:03. Tied 7–7. Drive: 13 plays, 66 yards, 6:21.

Second quarter

- DEN – Clinton Portis 1-yard run (Jason Elam kick), 11:18. Broncos 14–7. Drive: 11 plays, 69 yards, 6:45.
- KC – Priest Holmes 1-yard run (Morten Andersen kick), 7:36. Tied 14–14. Drive: 7 plays, 36 yards, 3:42.
- DEN – Jason Elam 47-yard field goal, 5:28. Broncos 17–14. Drive: 6 plays, 42 yards, 2:08.
- KC – Eddie Kennison 42-yard pass from Trent Green (Morten Andersen kick), 1:19. Chiefs 21–17. Drive: 11 plays, 86 yards, 4:09.

Third quarter

- DEN – Reuben Droughns 3-yard pass from Jake Plummer (Jason Elam kick), 5:58. Broncos 24–21. Drive: 12 plays, 78 yards, 7:27.
- DEN – Clinton Portis 59-yard run (Jason Elam kick), 2:42. Broncos 31–21. Drive: 4 plays, 79 yards, 1:20.

Fourth quarter

- DEN – Clinton Portis 28-yard run (Jason Elam kick), 11:24. Broncos 38–21. Drive: 8 plays, 74 yards, 4:02.
- DEN – Clinton Portis 53-yard run (Jason Elam kick), 7:58. Broncos 45–21. Drive: 1 play, 53 yards, 0:10.
- KC – Trent Green 1-yard run (run failed), 0:02. Broncos 45–27. Drive: 8 plays, 75 yards, 2:13.

Top passers

- KC – Trent Green – 34/47, 397 yards, TD
- DEN – Jake Plummer – 20/29, 238 yards, TD

Top rushers

- KC – Priest Holmes – 12 rushes, 44 yards, 2 TD
- DEN – Clinton Portis – 22 rushes, 218 yards, 5 TD

Top receivers

- KC – Dante Hall – 11 receptions, 124 yards
- DEN – Rod Smith – 7 receptions, 85 yards

==== Week 15 ====
Week 15: Cleveland Browns at Denver Broncos

Quarter	1	2	3	4	OT	Total
Browns	0	10	0	10	0	20
Broncos	10	0	0	10	3	23

at Invesco Field at Mile High, Denver, Colorado

- Game time: 2:00 p.m. MDT
- Game weather: 52 °F (11 °C), Partly Cloudy
- Game attendance: 75,358
- Referee: Mike Carey
- TV announcers (CBS): Kevin Harlan and Randy Cross
- Recap, Game Book

Game information

First quarter

- DEN – Clinton Portis 1-yard run (Jason Elam kick), 10:06. Broncos 7–0. Drive: 7 plays, 38 yards, 3:29.
- DEN – Jason Elam 51-yard field goal, 1:33. Broncos 10–0. Drive: 11 plays, 39 yards, 6:12.

Second quarter

- CLE – Brett Conway 39-yard field goal, 6:00. Broncos 10–3. Drive: 5 plays, 35 yards, 1:44.
- CLE – Keith Heinrich 1-yard pass from Tim Couch (Brett Conway kick), 0:00. Tied 10–10. Drive: 10 plays, 87 yards, 3:03.

Third quarter

- No scoring plays

Fourth quarter

- DEN – Clinton Portis 13-yard run (Jason Elam kick), 10:43. Broncos 17–10. Drive: 6 plays, 46 yards, 3:20.
- CLE – Andre Davis 35-yard pass from Tim Couch (Brett Conway kick), 7:48. Tied 17–17. Drive: 3 plays, 34 yards, 0:53.
- CLE – Brett Conway 48-yard field goal, 1:11. Browns 20–17. Drive: 7 plays, 42 yards, 3:04.
- DEN – Jason Elam 36-yard field goal, 0:06. Tied 20–20. Drive: 5 plays, 58 yards, 1:05.

Overtime

- DEN – Jason Elam 25-yard field goal, 9:50. Broncos 23–20. Drive: 8 plays, 46 yards, 4:10.

Top passers

- CLE – Tim Couch – 8/18, 181 yards, 2 TD, INT
- DEN – Jake Plummer – 22/36, 269 yards, INT

Top rushers

- CLE – Jamel White – 20 rushes, 55 yards
- DEN – Clinton Portis – 38 rushes, 139 yards, 2 TD

Top receivers

- CLE – Dennis Northcutt – 3 receptions, 115 yards
- DEN – Shannon Sharpe – 8 receptions, 97 yards

==== Week 16 ====
Week 16: Denver Broncos at Indianapolis Colts

Quarter	1	2	3	4	Total
Broncos	14	14	0	3	31
Colts	7	10	0	0	17

at RCA Dome, Indianapolis, Indiana

- Game time: 8:30 p.m. EST/6:30 p.m MST
- Game weather: Game played indoors (Domed stadium)
- Game attendance: 57,149
- Referee: Jeff Triplette
- TV announcers (ESPN): Mike Patrick, Joe Theismann, Paul Maguire and Suzy Kolber
- Recap, Game Book

Game information

First quarter

- IND – Gary Brackett 31-yard interception return (Mike Vanderjagt kick), 12:59. Colts 7–0.
- DEN – Mike Anderson 2-yard run (Jason Elam kick), 9:55. Tied 7–7. Drive: 6 plays, 75 yards, 3:04.
- DEN – Jake Plummer 6-yard run (Jason Elam kick), 2:06. Broncos 14–7. Drive: 8 plays, 57 yards, 5:44.

Second quarter

- IND – Edgerrin James 16-yard run (Mike Vanderjagt kick), 14:10. Tied 14–14. Drive: 6 plays, 57 yards, 2:56.
- DEN – Jake Plummer 1-yard run (Jason Elam kick), 6:20. Broncos 21–14. Drive: 12 plays, 81 yards, 7:50.
- DEN – Rod Smith 15-yard pass from Jake Plummer (Jason Elam kick), 1:11. Broncos 28–14. Drive: 7 plays, 67 yards, 3:58.
- IND – Mike Vanderjagt 40-yard field goal, 0:04. Broncos 28–17. Drive: 7 plays, 45 yards, 1:07.

Third quarter

- No scoring plays

Fourth quarter

- DEN – Jason Elam 24-yard field goal, 4:26. Broncos 31–17. Drive: 15 plays, 82 yards, 9:34.

Top passers

- DEN – Jake Plummer – 14/17, 238 yards, TD, INT
- IND – Peyton Manning – 12/23, 146 yards

Top rushers

- DEN – Quentin Griffin – 28 rushes, 136 yards
- IND – Edgerrin James – 10 rushes, 42 yards, TD

Top receivers

- DEN – Ashley Lelie – 5 receptions, 115 yards
- IND – Marvin Harrison – 6 receptions, 85 yards

==== Week 17 ====
Week 17: Denver Broncos at Green Bay Packers

Quarter	1	2	3	4	Total
Broncos	0	0	3	0	3
Packers	7	3	7	14	31

at Lambeau Field, Green Bay, Wisconsin

- Game time: 3:15 p.m. CST/2:15 p.m. MST
- Game weather: 45 °F (7 °C), Mostly Cloudy
- Game attendance: 70,299
- Referee: Bill Carollo
- TV announcers (CBS): Greg Gumbel, Phil Simms and Armen Keteyian
- Recap, Game Book

Game information

First quarter

- GB – Bubba Franks 2-yard pass from Brett Favre (Ryan Longwell kick), 8:49. Packers 7–0. Drive: 12 plays, 80 yards, 6:11.

Second quarter

- GB – Ryan Longwell 33-yard field goal, 4:43. Packers 10–0. Drive: 10 plays, 32 yards, 5:25.

Third quarter

- DEN – Jason Elam 31-yard field goal, 4:00. Packers 10–3. Drive: 8 plays, 35 yards, 4:06.
- GB – Ahman Green 2-yard run (Ryan Longwell kick), 1:35. Packers 17–3. Drive: 4 plays, 69 yards, 2:25.

Fourth quarter

- GB – Ahman Green 98-yard run (Ryan Longwell kick), 13:18. Packers 24–3. Drive: 1 play, 98 yards, 0:13.
- GB – Marcus Wilkins fumble recovery in the end zone (Ryan Longwell kick), 13:10. Packers 31–3.

Top passers

- DEN – Danny Kanell – 9/18, 61 yards, INT
- GB – Brett Favre – 12/21, 116 yards, TD, INT

Top rushers

- DEN – Quentin Griffin – 21 rushes, 74 yards
- GB – Ahman Green – 20 rushes, 218 yards, 2 TD

Top receivers

- DEN – Jeb Putzier – 4 receptions, 34 yards
- GB – Javon Walker – 3 receptions, 41 yards

=== Standings ===
AFC West
	W	L	T	PCT	DIV	CONF	PF	PA	STK
^{(2)} Kansas City Chiefs	13	3	0	.813	5–1	10–2	484	332	W1
^{(6)} Denver Broncos	10	6	0	.625	5–1	9–3	381	301	L1
Oakland Raiders	4	12	0	.250	1–5	3–9	270	379	L2
San Diego Chargers	4	12	0	.250	1–5	2–10	313	441	W1

== Postseason ==
Round	Date	Opponent (seed)	Result	Record	Venue	Recap
AFC Wild Card	January 4	at Indianapolis Colts (3)	L 10–41	0-1	RCA Dome	Recap

=== Game summaries ===
==== AFC Wild Card Playoffs: at (#3) Indianapolis Colts ====
AFC Wild Card Playoffs: (6) Denver Broncos at (3) Indianapolis Colts

Quarter	1	2	3	4	Total
Broncos	3	0	0	7	10
Colts	14	17	10	0	41

at RCA Dome, Indianapolis, Indiana

- Game time: 4:30 p.m. EST/2:30 p.m. MST
- Game weather: Indoors (dome)
- Game attendance: 56,586
- Referee: Johnny Grier
- TV announcers (CBS): Greg Gumbel, Phil Simms and Armen Keteyian
- Recap, Game Book

Game information

First quarter

- IND – Brandon Stokley 31-yard pass from Peyton Manning (Mike Vanderjagt kick), 11:55. Colts 7–0. Drive: 6 plays, 70 yards, 3:05.
- DEN – Jason Elam 49-yard field goal, 3:41. Colts 7–3. Drive: 12 plays, 47 yards, 8:14.
- IND – Marvin Harrison 46-yard pass from Peyton Manning (Mike Vanderjagt kick), 0:24. Colts 14–3. Drive: 8 plays, 81 yards, 3:17.

Second quarter

- IND – Marvin Harrison 23-yard pass from Peyton Manning (Mike Vanderjagt kick), 7:28. Colts 21–3. Drive: 8 plays, 80 yards, 3:49.
- IND – Brandon Stokley 87-yard pass from Peyton Manning (Mike Vanderjagt kick), 1:51. Colts 28–3. Drive: 1 play, 87 yards, 0:10.
- IND – Mike Vanderjagt 27-yard field goal, 0:00. Colts 31–3. Drive: 6 plays, 49 yards, 0:55.

Third quarter

- IND – Reggie Wayne 7-yard pass from Peyton Manning (Mike Vanderjagt kick), 5:19. Colts 38–3. Drive: 12 plays, 64 yards, 5:45.
- IND – Mike Vanderjagt 20-yard field goal, 0:55. Colts 41–3. Drive: 6 plays, 17 yards, 3:38.

Fourth quarter

- DEN – Rod Smith 7-yard pass from Jake Plummer (Jason Elam kick), 7:04. Colts 41–10. Drive: 12 plays, 62 yards, 6:18.

Top passers

- DEN – Jake Plummer – 20/33, 181 yards, TD, 2 INT
- IND – Peyton Manning – 22/26, 377 yards, 5 TD

Top rushers

- DEN – Clinton Portis – 17 rushes, 68 yards
- IND – Edgerrin James – 17 rushes, 78 yards

Top receivers

- DEN – Rod Smith – 5 receptions, 66 yards, TD
- IND – Brandon Stokley – 4 receptions, 144 yards, 2 TD
