= Terry Pierce =

American football player (born 1981)

No. 58, 95
- Position: Linebacker

Personal information
- Born: June 21, 1981 (age 45); Fort Worth, Texas, U.S.
- Listed height: 6 ft 1 in (1.85 m)
- Listed weight: 251 lb (114 kg)

Career information
- High school: Western Hills (Benbrook, Texas)
- College: Kansas State
- NFL draft: 2003: 2nd round, 51st overall pick

Career history

Playing
- Denver Broncos (2003–2004); Houston Texans (2006)*
- * Offseason or practice squad member only

Coaching
- Bishop Miege (KS) (2025–present) Co-defensive coordinator / Safeties

Awards and highlights
- Big 12 Defensive Freshman of the Year (2000)

Career NFL statistics
- Tackles: 9
- Forced fumbles: 1
- Passes defended: 1
- Stats at Pro Football Reference

Terry Pierce (born June 21, 1981) is an American former professional football player who was a linebacker of the National Football League (NFL). He played college football for the Kansas State Wildcats and was selected by the Denver Broncos in the second round of the 2003 NFL draft.

== Early life ==
Pierce attended Western Hills High School in Benbrook, Texas.

== College career ==
Pierce first came to Kansas State University and was redshirted. He played in all but one game in 2000, including the Cotton Bowl Classic. After racking up 38 tackles (six for a loss) and three pass break-ups, he was named the Big 12 Defensive Freshman of the Year.

In 10 starts in 2001, Pierce recorded 68 tackles and three sacks while earning Academic All-Big 12 honors. His junior season, he posted 104 tackles and five sacks. He subsequently declared for the NFL draft with a year of college eligibility remaining.

== Professional career ==
Pre-draft measurables
Height	Weight	Arm length	Hand span	Vertical jump	Bench press
6 ft 1 in (1.85 m)	251 lb (114 kg)	32 1/4 in (0.82 m)	9 7/8 in (0.25 m)	27 1/2 in (0.70 m)	28 reps
All values from NFL Combine.

=== Denver Broncos ===
Pierce was chosen by the Denver Broncos in the second round (51st overall) in the 2003 NFL draft. On July 25, he signed a four-year, $2.7 million contract that included a $1.32 million signing bonus.

During his rookie season in 2004, Pierce was inactive for the first seven games of the regular season. He made his NFL debut on October 26 against the Baltimore Ravens, but did not record any statistics. The following week, he posted three tackles (two solo) against the New England Patriots. On November 16, Pierce suffered a torn pectoral muscle and was subsequently placed on injured reserve, ending his season.

In 2004, Pierce was to battle Donnie Spragan and Jashon Sykes for the starting strong-side linebacker job. However, Pierce suffered a sprained medial collateral ligament in August, losing his chance at the job. He was able to recover in time for the regular season opener, but played primarily on special teams during the season and recorded just five tackles in 15 games.

Pierce was moved from inside to outside linebacker in the 2005 offseason, and worked there throughout the preseason. However, he was waived on September 3 at the conclusion of the preseason. He worked out for the Seattle Seahawks and Dallas Cowboys on separate occasions in October 2005, but was not signed.

=== Houston Texans ===
On January 18, 2006, the Houston Texans signed Pierce to a future contract. However, he was released on July 14, before training camp began.

== Coaching career ==
On March 24, 2025, Cozart was hired to serve as the co-defensive coordinator and safeties coach at Bishop Miege High School.
