= Jason Elam =

American football player (born 1970)

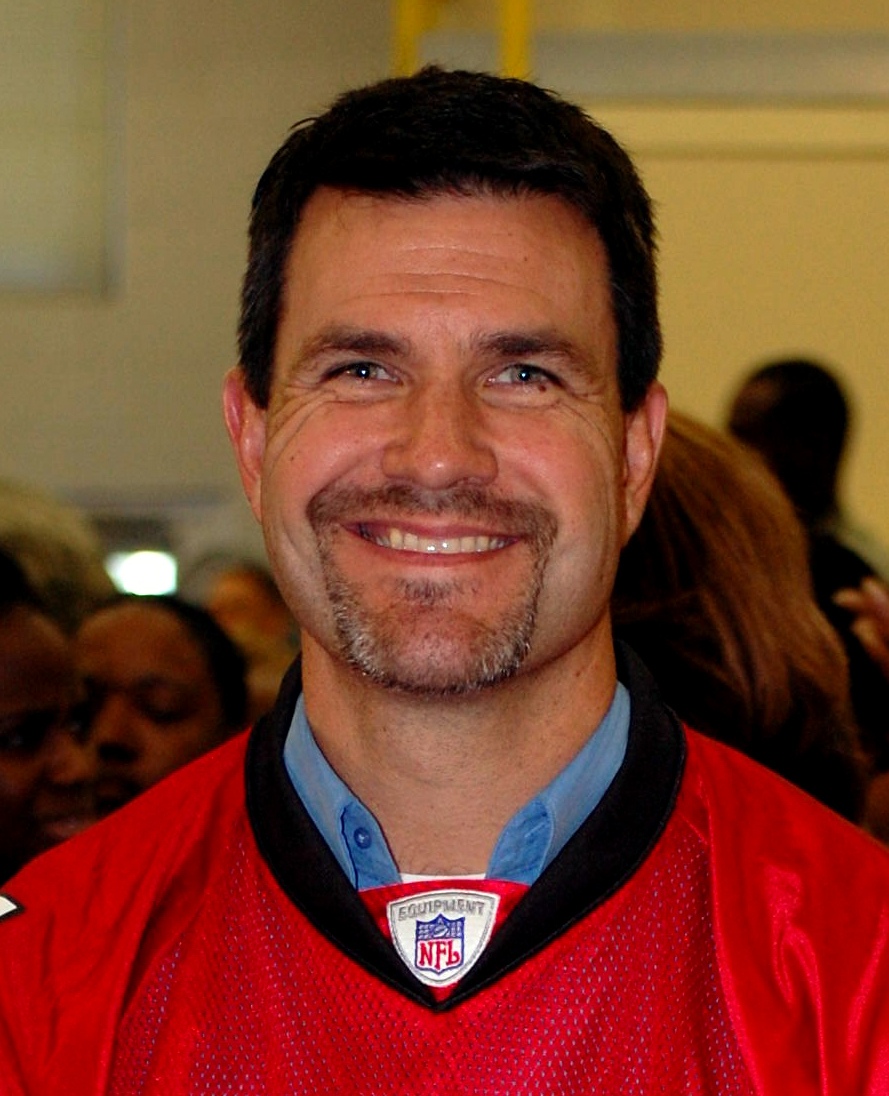
- Elam in 2009

No. 1
- Position: Placekicker

Personal information
- Born: March 8, 1970 (age 56); Fort Walton Beach, Florida, U.S.
- Listed height: 5 ft 11 in (1.80 m)
- Listed weight: 194 lb (88 kg)

Career information
- High school: Brookwood (Snellville, Georgia)
- College: Hawaii (1988–1992)
- NFL draft: 1993: 3rd round, 70th overall pick

Career history
- Denver Broncos (1993–2007); Atlanta Falcons (2008–2009)

Awards and highlights
- 2x Super Bowl champion (XXXII, XXXIII); 3× Second-team All-Pro (1995, 1998, 2001); 3× Pro Bowl (1995, 1998, 2001); PFWA All-Rookie Team (1993); Denver Broncos Ring of Fame; Denver Broncos 50th Anniversary Team; First-team All-American (1992); Third-team All-American (1991); WAC Special Teams Player of the Year (1992); 3× First-team All-WAC (1989, 1991-1992); Second-team All-WAC (1988)

Career NFL statistics
- Field goals made: 436
- Field goals attempted: 550
- Field goal %: 80.7
- Longest field goal: 63
- Points scored: 1,983
- Stats at Pro Football Reference

Jason Douglas Elam (EE-ləm; born March 8, 1970) is an American former professional football player who was a placekicker in the National Football League (NFL), primarily with the Denver Broncos. He was selected by Denver in the third round of the 1993 NFL draft and played 15 seasons with the Broncos and two with the Atlanta Falcons.

A three-time Pro Bowl selection, Elam won two Super Bowl rings with the Broncos and was tied with Tom Dempsey, Sebastian Janikowski, and David Akers for the longest field goal in NFL history at 63 yards. The record has since been broken.

== Early life ==
Elam attended Brookwood High School in Snellville, Georgia where he was the placekicker and punter for the football team. As a junior, he connected on 2 of 4 field goal attempts, hit all five point after attempts and averaged 38 yards per punt. As a senior, Elam went 11-18 on field goal attempts with misses form 57, 62, 63, and 65 yards. His longest successful kick was from 52 yards which set a school record. He was perfect on 26 extra points in his career and averaged 44 yards punting. He was named first team all-county for both place kicker and punter and class AAAA all-state honorable mention as a place kicker.

Elam also lettered in swimming and track and field.

== College career ==
In four years (1988–1992) as the placekicker for the University of Hawaii at Mānoa football team, Elam scored the third-most points in NCAA history (397) and tied for the second-most field goals kicked (79). He held the record for all-time leading scorer in the Western Athletic Conference until 2010 and an All-American as well as a three-time All-WAC selection. He is Hawaii's career leader in field goals made and field goal percentage. Elam majored in communications at the University of Hawaii and was awarded Second-team Academic All-American and was the male recipient of the 1992 Stan Bates Award, presented to the WAC's top scholar-athlete .

== Professional career ==
Pre-draft measurables
Height	Weight	Arm length	Hand span
5 ft 11 1/8 in (1.81 m)	192 lb (87 kg)	28 5/8 in (0.73 m)	8 1/2 in (0.22 m)

=== Denver Broncos ===
Elam was drafted by the Broncos in the third round (70th pick overall) of the 1993 NFL draft.

Elam holds NFL records for best extra point conversion percentage (.995), most consecutive seasons with at least 100 points (15), fastest to 300 successful field goals, and fastest to 1,600 and 1,700 points. Elam was also the first player in NFL history to score at least 200 points against three or more teams: the San Diego Chargers (222), Oakland Raiders (215), and Kansas City Chiefs (203). Elam is tied with Steve Christie, Jason Hanson, and Jim Breech for the most overtime field goals with nine. Elam was named to the Denver Broncos 50th Anniversary Team in 2009.

==== 1994 ====
Elam scored 119 points throughout his rookie season, placing him fourth in the AFC (seventh in NFL) for points scored, while his 26 field goals tied for the fourth-highest total in team history. Elam was successful on four of six field goal attempts longer than 50 yards. His 54-yarder against San Diego Chargers was the fourth-longest in team history.

==== 1995 ====
In 1995, he finished tied for third in the NFL in scoring with 132 points and tied for second in field goals made with 31 as he was voted to his first Pro Bowl. On the season, he was 31 for 38 (.816) on field-goal attempts and 39 for 39 on extra-point attempts. His breakthrough season also included second-team All-Pro honors from both Associated Press and All-AFC honors from Pro Football Weekly. He set the tone for his stellar season in the opener vs. Buffalo Bills, tying a Broncos single-game record with five successful field goals in six attempts (22, 52, 20, 38 and 37 yards). His 56-yarder at Houston was the longest of his career and the second longest in franchise history behind Steinfort 57-yarder vs. Washington in 1980. Elam made a franchise-record 13 consecutive field goals during the middle of the season, beginning with a 30-yarder at Seattle Seahawks and ending with a 35-yarder vs. the Chargers. On December 24 vs. the Oakland Raiders, Elam scored 11 points, including the game-winning 37-yard field goal with 48 seconds remaining, in Denver's 31–28 victory. It was the second time in 1995 that Elam had kicked a game-winning field goal in the final minute.

==== 1996 ====
In 1996, he converted 21 of 28 field goal attempts with a .750 percentage and all 46 extra-point attempts to lead the Broncos with 109 points. He also tied the team record for most extra points in a game with six against the Baltimore Ravens in a 45–34 Broncos win. He connected on his only 50-yard-plus field goal of the 1996 season at San Diego in the regular-season finale.

==== 1997 ====
In the 1997 season, he converted 26 of 36 field-goal attempts (.722) and tied his own franchise record for extra points in a season by going a perfect 46 of 46. His 124 total points on the season ranked second in the AFC (fourth in the NFL), and his 46 extra points led the AFC and were second in the NFL. During the postseason, he was perfect, converting all 15 extra-point attempts and both field goal attempts of 43 and 51 yards. His 51-yard field goal in Super Bowl XXXII against the Green Bay Packers was the second longest in Super Bowl history since Steve Christie's 54-yarder for the Buffalo Bills in Super Bowl XXVIII as well as the longest in Broncos postseason history. He passed the 500-point plateau with his final extra-point attempt at Seattle, becoming only the third Bronco in history to do so and the fastest in terms of games played (66). He also kicked the game-winning 33-yard field goal in overtime at Buffalo, the second time in his career that Elam had won a game for the Broncos in overtime. He tied his own franchise record with five field goals at Kansas City Chiefs, matching the standard achieved previously by himself.

==== 1998 ====
In 1998, Elam was selected to his second Pro Bowl and was named second-team All-NFL by the Associated Press and All-AFC by Pro Football Weekly and Football News. He enjoyed his finest season statistically in 1998, converting 23 of 27 field goal attempts for a career-best and franchise-record percentage of .852. He also made all 58 extra-point attempts for 127 total points.

On October 25, 1998, Elam kicked a 63-yard field goal to end the first half against the Jacksonville Jaguars, tying Tom Dempsey's 28-year-old record for the longest field goal in NFL history. His cleats from the game are currently on display in the Pro Football Hall of Fame. Elam also scored the 20,000th televised point on ABC Monday Night Football. He tied for third in the AFC (tied for fifth in the NFL) in scoring by kickers, and his 58 extra-point conversions ranked second in the NFL while also representing a team record for a single season. He also made six of eight field goal attempts and all 11 extra-point attempts for a team-leading 29 points in three postseason contests to move into second place in all-time postseason scoring by a Bronco. Elam converted two of four field goal attempts in Super Bowl XXXIII versus Atlanta Falcons and all four extra points for 10 points in the Broncos 34–19 win, earning his second Super Bowl Ring in his career. Against the Dallas Cowboys, he tied a franchise record that he already shared with four other players by converting six extra-point attempts. He set a franchise record for consecutive field goals made at Kansas City on Monday Night Football, converting his 14th in a row to top Rich Karlis' previous standard of 13 (1984–85), and he ran his streak to 19 consecutive before having a 37-yard attempt blocked vs. the Chiefs.

==== 1999 ====
In 1999, he converted all 29 extra-point attempts and was 29 of 36 (.806) on field-goal attempts to account for 116 points on the season, tied for fifth in the AFC and tied for sixth in the league. He was 5–7 on field-goal attempts between 50 and 59 yards in 1999 to improve his career percentage from that range to 63.7 percent (21–33). He was successful from 50 yards at Kansas City, 51 yards against the New York Jets, 55 yards at San Diego, 53 yards against Oakland and 50 against San Diego again. The 55-yarder at San Diego was the third longest of his career, the effort earned Elam AFC Special Teams Player of the Week honors for Week 9 as he made four field goals and scored 15 points in the game, his highest single-game totals for both categories since setting career highs with five field goals and 16 points at Kansas on November 16, 1997. Elam matched the four field goal effort vs. Oakland on Monday Night Football with one of the most pressure-filled conversions of his career from 53 yards with seven seconds remaining to tie the score at 21 and send the game to overtime. It proved to be the eighth game-winning or game-saving field goal of his career as the Broncos went on to win 27–21.

==== 2000 ====
In 2000, Elam was 18 of 24 (.750) on field-goal attempts and 49 of 49 on extra-point attempts to account for 103 points on the season, 10th most in the AFC. With his three PAT attempts at the New York Jets, he passed Jim Turner for most PAT attempts in Denver history and became the first Bronco to make 200 field goals in a career with his successful boot from 26 yards vs. San Diego. His five extra points at New Orleans gave him an NFL record for consecutive extra points, breaking Norm Johnson's standard of 301 (Elam finished the season having made 313 consecutive PATs).

==== 2001 ====
In 2001, he was voted to his third Pro Bowl was also named the NFL 2001 Special Teams Player of the Year by the NFL Alumni and voted second-team All-NFL. He led the NFL in field goals with a franchise record-tying 31 while also tying for third in the league with 124 points. The AFC Special Teams Player of the Month for November, Elam converted a franchise-record 86.1 percent of his field goals (31 of 36) and all 31 extra-point attempts to extend his NFL record for consecutive extra points to 344. Elam enjoyed a record-setting night at Oakland, hitting two field goals, including a 39-yarder that gave him his 1,000th career point to make him the 30th NFL player to reach that plateau as well as extend his franchise scoring record. He scored 14 points against San Diego with a season-high four field goals, hitting from 25, 29, 26 and 33 yards, as well as two PATs.

For the second time in three games, he scored a season-high 14 points at Dallas, hitting four field goals (24, 50, 46 and 28 yds.) and both extra-point opportunities. He was named AFC Special Teams Player of the Month for November when he led all NFL kickers with 38 points and 11 field goals. He converted 11 of 12 field-goal attempts (.917) during the month, including two from beyond 45 yards, tied his career single-season high with his 31st field goal of the year in the season finale vs. the Indianapolis Colts, matching his mark from 1995.

==== 2002 ====
In the 2002 season, he converted 26 of 36 field-goal attempts (.722) and 42 of 43 (.977) extra-point attempts to account for a team-leading 120 points, marking his 10th consecutive season with 100 or more points. Also in 2002, he tied his career-high with five field goals (on five attempts) vs. the Miami Dolphins, including a 55-yard kick. He also tied a career-high by scoring 16 points in the contest, he made all three field-goal attempts at Kansas City, including the game-winner from 25 yards in overtime. It was his 11th career game-winning or game-saving field goal and his third in an overtime situation, Elam, who at the time owned the NFL record for consecutive extra points (371, later broken by Matt Stover), saw the streak end against Indianapolis Colts.

==== 2003 ====
In 2003, he played all 16 regular-season games and converted 27 of 31 field goal attempts (.871) and all 39 extra point attempts to account for 120 points, third most in the AFC (fourth in NFL) among kickers. In the season opener at the Cincinnati Bengals, he made all three field goal attempts (51, 27, 39) and totaled 12 points to eclipse the 1,200-point plateau (1,205), doing so in fewer games than any player in NFL history (157 games). Against the Pittsburgh Steelers, Elam made his first game-winning field goal of the season when he connected on a 47-yarder as time expired. With the field goal, he surpassed Jim Breech and moved into 19th place on the NFL's all-time scoring list with 1,249 points. He added three field goals, including a 51-yarder, against the Cleveland Browns and became the fastest player in NFL history to reach 1,300 points in 170 games and the first player in NFL history to score more than 100 points in each of his first 11 seasons. He earned AFC Special Teams Player of the Week honors. It marked the first time in Elam's career that he made field goals to send a game to overtime and then win the game in overtime. The overtime field goal was his sixth career “walk-off” field goal (four OT, two at the end of regulation).

==== 2004 ====
In 2004, Elam connected on 29 of 34 field-goal attempts (.853) with a long of 52 yards for the Broncos. He accounted for 129 of Denver 381 points in 2004 (87 points on field goals, 42 on PATs) for his 12th consecutive 100-point season. Also in 2004, he notched in 300th career field goal against the Carolina Panthers, becoming the fastest kicker in NFL history to reach that mark and one of only 16 kickers with 300 or more field goals. He helped Denver overcome a stingy defense vs. the Tampa Bay Buccaneers by hitting all three field goals that day to earn AFC Special Teams Player of the Week honors for the fourth time in his career. In addition to making a 50-yard field goal against the Buccaneers in the second quarter, he added a clutch fourth-quarter 23-yarder to secure a win that marked his 16th career game-winning or game-tying field goal. Elam took over sole possession of second place on the NFL all-time consecutive scoring streak list (187 games with at least one point) vs. the Tennessee Titans, making three of four field goals and all four PATs against the Titans while passing Matt Bahr for 15th place on the NFL all-time scoring list.

==== 2005 ====
In 2005, he connected on 24 of 32 field goals for a .750 percentage and 43 of 44 PATs to total 115 points that ranked fifth in the AFC and ninth in the NFL among kickers. He also surpassed the 1,500-point plateau faster than any player in league history, doing so in just 197 games. With his performance versus the New England Patriots in an AFC Divisional Playoff Game, he became the Broncos postseason leader in field goals (15) and points (84). He converted both extra-point attempts and connected on field goals of 41 and 45 yards in the home opener against San Diego. The 41-yarder came with five seconds remaining in regulation and gave the Broncos a 20–17 win, marking the 18th game-winning field goal of his career. He set career highs in PAT attempts and conversions in a game by connecting on all seven extra-point attempts vs. the Philadelphia Eagles. He also reached the 1,500-point plateau faster than any player in league history as he eclipsed the milestone with an extra point in the second quarter against the Oakland Raiders in his 197th career game. On Thanksgiving Day against the Dallas Cowboys, Elam connected on his only field-goal attempt of 24 yards in overtime as well as all three PATs. The overtime field goal was the 19th game-winning field goal of his career.

==== 2006 ====
In 2006, his 14th season with the Broncos, Elam moved into seventh place on the league's all-time field goals made list (368) and ninth on the league all-time points scored list (1,672) as he connected on 27 of 29 field goal attempts (.931), setting a Denver single-season record for accuracy, along with all 34 PATs. His 115 points ranked ninth in the NFL, and he became the first kicker in league history to post at least 100 points in each of his first 14 seasons. Elam scored at least once in every game to extend his scoring streak to 220 games, in every game of his career, marking the second-longest such streak in league history. He accounted for all of the Broncos points as he connected on three of four field goals, including a 39-yarder in overtime, in the home opener versus Kansas City. He tied Eddie Murray for eighth on the league all-time points scored list with 352 successful field goals as he hit his lone attempt against Indianapolis and became the fastest player in NFL history to reach the 1,600-point mark in 211 games. Against the Arizona Cardinals, he moved into a tie with Fred Cox (455) for twelfth in league history in field goal attempts and passed Nick Lowery (562) to move into seventh place in league history in extra points made by making three field goals.

==== 2007 ====
In his last season as a Denver Bronco, he scored in all 16 games, connecting on 27 of 31 field goal tries and all 33 extra point attempts for 114 points. Against the San Diego Chargers, he surpassed the record of 233 games played as a Bronco by John Elway. He hit three game-winning field goals on the last play of those games as well as hitting one as time expired to send a game into overtime. He nailed the game-winning 42-yard field goal as time expired for the 21st game-winning or game-saving kick of his career in the season opener against the Buffalo Bills. He earned AFC Special Teams Player of the Week for his performance in the home opener as he connected on field goals of 23, 20 and 23 yards and both extra points vs. Oakland, then made the winning field goal in OT. He reached the 1,700-point plateau faster than any player (224 games) as he tallied eight points (two FG and two PAT) at the Indianapolis Colts and connected on field goals from 21 and 39 yards as well as all four extra point attempts on Monday Night Football vs. the Tennessee Titans and moved into sixth all-time in points scored in the NFL with 1,746. He hit both field goal attempts of 43 and 30 yards, including the overtime winner in the season finale vs. the Minnesota Vikings.

While with the Broncos, Elam reached seventh place on the NFL's all-time points scored list. He reached that position with a game-winning 48-yard field goal on October 21, 2007, giving him 1,712 career points, converted four extra points and a 49-yard field goal on Sunday Night Football vs. Pittsburgh. He connected on attempts from 45 and 21 yards as well as an extra point on Monday Night Football against the Green Bay Packers. His 21-yard field goal against the Packers was his 24th either game-winning or game-saving field goal as it tied the score at 13 as regulation time expired. He booted an extra point and missed a 48-yard field goal against the Detroit Lions. The overtime kick against the Vikings was also the 12th walk-off kick of his career. His two successful field goals extended his streak of successful kicks to 15, the third-longest streak in team history. He also moved into sole possession of seventh place in field goal attempts (490) and became just the sixth player in league history to make 600 extra points. Elam also kicked four game-winning field goals, becoming the first player to do so since at least 1990.

=== Atlanta Falcons ===
==== 2008 ====
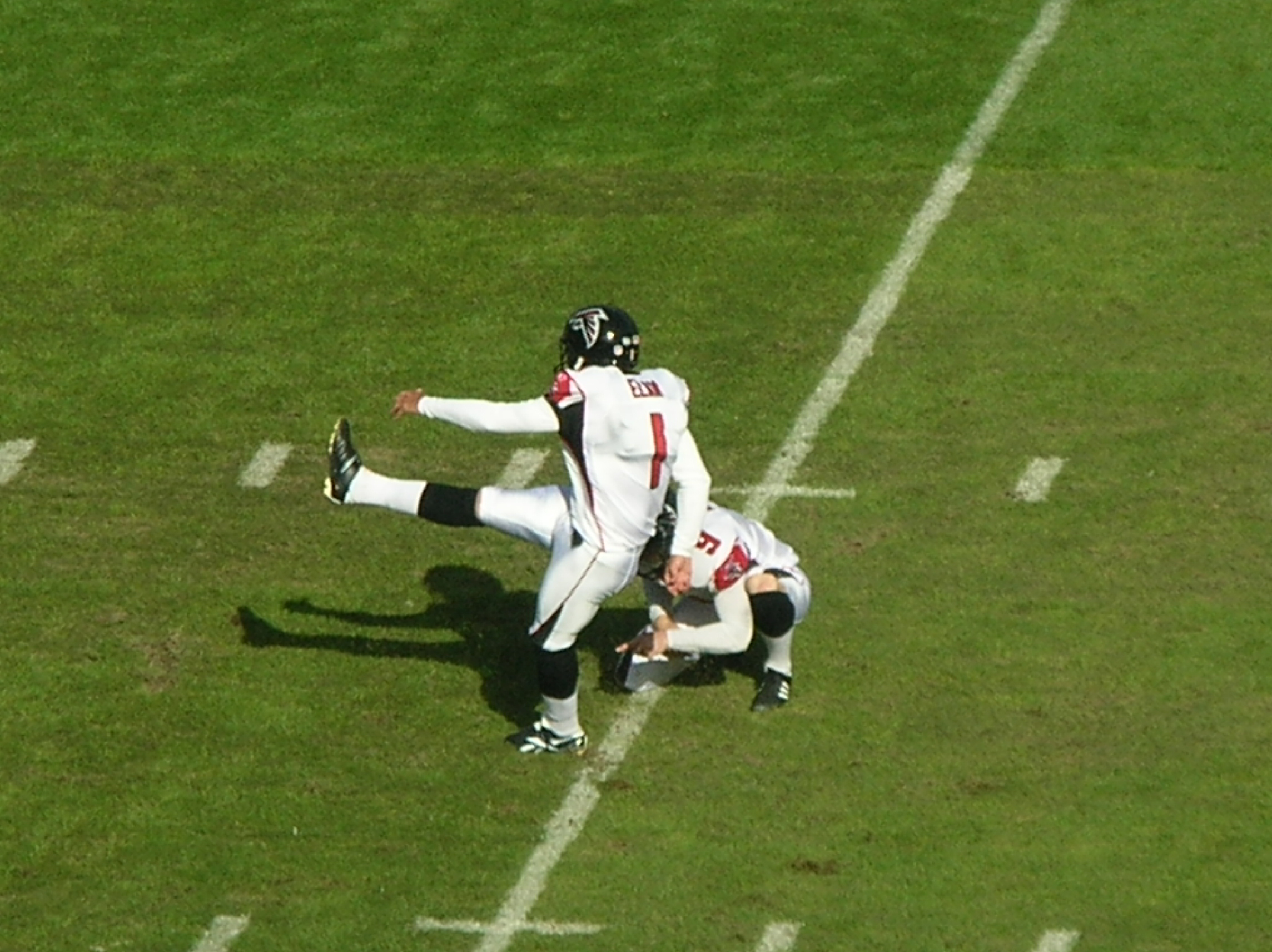
Elam kicks a PAT in a road game against the Oakland Raiders on November 2, 2008.

On March 21, 2008, the Atlanta Falcons signed Elam to a four-year, $9 million contract with $3.3 million guaranteed. Against the Detroit Lions, he split the uprights on both attempts, his first two in a Falcons uniform. Elam extended his streak of consecutive field goals to 17 and also notched his 38th field goal of 50-plus yards. Against Tampa Bay he made three field goals, all of Atlanta's points in the game.

In week 6 against the Chicago Bears, Elam made five of six field goal attempts from 29, 48, 32, 41, and 48 yards. Chicago came off a miscue with a 77-yard touchdown drive to take a 20–19 lead with 11 seconds to play. Coming off a 26-yard strike from rookie quarterback Matt Ryan to Michael Jenkins, Elam's kick of 48 yards was converted with one second left in the game to clinch a Falcons victory. Along with adding one PAT, Elam accounted for 16 points. His two kicks of 48 yards tied for the second-longest that season. Elam missed a kick from 33 yards in the fourth quarter, which ended a streak of 29 consecutive field goals dating back to the 2007 season. His five field goals made, six field goals attempted and 16 points all tied career-highs.

==== 2009 ====
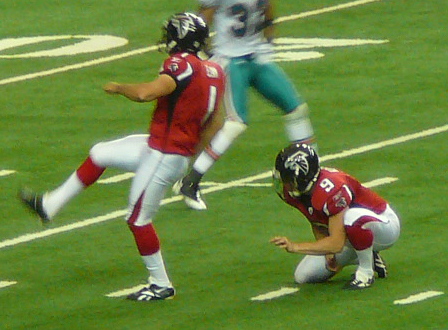
Elam (left) in 2009.

In 2009, Elam was only eight for 15 in field goals over 30 yards. He was waived on December 1, 2009.

=== Retirement ===
On March 30, 2010, Elam signed a one-day ceremonial contract with Denver so he could retire as a Bronco.

== Career regular season statistics ==
Career high/best bolded

Regular season statistics
Season	Team (record)	G	FGM	FGA	%	<20	20-29	30-39	40-49	50+	LNG	BLK	XPM	XPA	%	PTS
1993	DEN (9–7)	16	26	35	74.3	0–0	11–12	7–7	4–10	4–6	54	0	41	42	97.6	119
1994	DEN (7–9)	16	30	37	81.1	0–0	**11–11**	11–11	7–12	1–3	54	0	29	29	**100.0**	119
1995	DEN (8–8)	16	**31**	**38**	81.6	0–0	7–9	**14–15**	5–7	**5–7**	56	0	39	39	**100.0**	**132**
1996	DEN (13–3)	16	21	28	75.0	**2–2**	8–8	4–5	6–10	1–3	51	0	46	46	**100.0**	109
1997	DEN (12–4)	15	26	36	72.2	0–0	10–11	10–12	3–8	3–5	53	**2**	46	46	**100.0**	124
1998	DEN (14–2)	16	23	27	85.2	0–0	3–3	13–14	4–6	3–4	**63**	1	**58**	**58**	**100.0**	127
1999	DEN (6–10)	16	29	36	80.6	1–1	8–8	7–8	8–11	5–8	55	1	29	29	**100.0**	116
2000	DEN (11–5)	13	18	24	75.0	0–0	7–7	6–7	4–9	1–1	51	0	49	49	**100.0**	103
2001	DEN (8–8)	16	**31**	36	86.1	0–0	**11–11**	8–8	10–13	2–4	50	1	31	31	**100.0**	124
2002	DEN (9–7)	16	26	36	72.2	1–1	9–9	7–9	5–11	4–6	55	1	42	43	97.7	120
2003	DEN (10–6)	16	27	31	87.1	0–0	10–11	6–6	9–11	2–3	51	0	39	39	**100.0**	120
2004	DEN (10–6)	16	29	34	85.3	0–0	10–10	7–8	9–12	3–4	52	1	42	42	**100.0**	129
2005	DEN (13–3)	16	24	32	75.0	0–0	9–10	5–5	9–13	1–4	51	1	43	44	97.7	115
2006	DEN (9–7)	16	27	29	93.1	0–0	10–10	10–10	6–8	1–1	51	0	34	34	**100.0**	115
2007	DEN (7–9)	16	27	31	87.1	0–0	**11–11**	6–6	9–12	1–2	50	0	33	33	**100.0**	114
2008	ATL (11–5)	16	29	31	**93.5**	0–0	**11–11**	7–8	**10–10**	1–2	50	0	42	42	**100.0**	129
2009	ATL (9–7)	11	12	19	63.2	0–0	4–4	4–8	3–5	1–2	50	0	32	33	97.0	68
Career (17 seasons)		263	436	540	80.7	4–4	150–156	132–147	111–168	39–65	63	8	675	679	99.4	1,983

Franchise records

As of 2017's NFL off-season, Jason Elam held at least 8 Broncos franchise records, including:

- Extra Points: career (601), game (5 on 2000-10-15 CLE; with Connor Barth), playoffs (39), playoff season (15 in 1997), playoff game (5 on 1999-01-09 MIA)
- Field Goals: career (395), season (31 in 1995, 2001), playoffs (15)

== Personal life ==
Elam has a wife, Tammy (a former Broncos cheerleader), four sons (Jason Jr., Joshua Matthew Jackson Asher, and Jude Dawson) and two daughters (Jordan Noel and Julianna Grace).

=== Books ===
Elam published his first book in January 2008, titled Monday Night Jihad. He co-wrote it with Steve Yohn, currently pastor at Strasburg Community Church in Strasburg, CO. The book is an action-adventure tale about football and an attempt to stop a terrorist plot.

In a statement issued by his publisher, Elam said, "The genesis of Monday Night Jihad goes back almost 10 years...My brother kept a journal of all the crazy football stories I'd told him over the years. About a year-and-a-half ago, I began to think what if I was able combine all those quirky stories with a terrorist element to create an action-adventure story. Through this story, I want to bring out why people of strong conviction do what they do."

In December 2008, Elam and Yohn released "Blown Coverage", the second book in the Riley Covington Thriller series. In December 2009 "Blackout", the third book was released, and the series was completed with "Inside Threat", released June 2011.

=== Other media ===
Jason and his wife were featured in a 2012 episode of Buying Alaska where they purchased an island home in Sitka, Alaska, to live in with their family.
