= Bryant McNeal =

American football player (born 1979)

No. 98
- Position: Defensive end

Personal information
- Born: July 13, 1979 (age 47); Swansea, South Carolina, U.S.

Career information
- College: Clemson
- NFL draft: 2003: 4th round, 128th overall pick

Career history
- 2003-2004: Denver Broncos
- 2004: Tampa Bay Buccaneers
- 2005: Seattle Seahawks*
- 2006-2007: Oakland Raiders*
- * Offseason or practice squad member only

Awards and highlights
- Second-team All-ACC (2002)

Bryant McNeal (born July 13, 1979) is an American former football defensive end who played in the National Football League (NFL). He played college football at Clemson University and led the Atlantic Coast Conference in sacks in 2002.

McNeal was drafted by the Denver Broncos in the fourth round of the 2003 NFL draft with the 128th overall pick. However McNeal signed with the Tampa Bay Buccaneers in December 2004 and was cut before the next season began. Bryant was signed to the Seattle Seahawks practice squad late in the 2005 regular season and stayed with the team all the way through their run to Super Bowl XL. The Oakland Raiders then signed McNeal in the 2006 off-season and remained with the Raiders through the entire regular season on the practice roster. He was again signed to the Oakland Raiders in January 2007 but was released prior to the start of training camp.
