= Jeremy LeSueur =

American football player (born 1980)

No. 31
- Position: Cornerback

Personal information
- Born: October 5, 1980 (age 46); Holly Springs, Mississippi, U.S.
- Listed height: 6 ft 0 in (1.83 m)
- Listed weight: 204 lb (93 kg)

Career information
- High school: Holly Springs
- College: Michigan
- NFL draft: 2004: 3rd round, 85th overall pick

Career history
- Denver Broncos (2004); New York Jets (2005); Seattle Seahawks (2005)*; Cleveland Browns (2006–2007)
- * Offseason or practice squad member only

Awards and highlights
- Second-team All-Big Ten (2003)
- Stats at Pro Football Reference

Jeremy LeSueur (born October 5, 1980) is an American former professional football player in the National Football League (NFL).

== Early life ==
Jeremy LeSueur was born on October 5, 1980, in Holly Springs, Mississippi.

== Professional career ==
=== Denver Broncos ===
LeSueur was selected by the Denver Broncos in the third round of the 2004 NFL draft. He played college football for the Michigan Wolverines.

After spending his rookie year on injured reserve, LeSueur was waived by the Broncos on September 3, 2005.

=== New York Jets ===
He was later signed to the New York Jets' practice squad. LeSueur was eventually promoted to the active roster and played in two games for the Jets.

=== Seattle Seahawks ===
After his practice squad contract with the Jets expired following the end of their season, he signed with the Seattle Seahawks' practice squad shortly before their appearance in Super Bowl XL, where they would end up losing to the Pittsburgh Steelers 10–21.

=== Cleveland Browns ===
On August 15, 2006, LeSueur was signed by the Cleveland Browns. He would spend the entire 2006 season and the beginning of the 2007 season on injured reserve before being waived by the Browns on September 4, 2007.
