= Lional Dalton =

American football player (born 1975)

No. 91, 94, 95, 75
- Position: Defensive tackle

Personal information
- Born: February 21, 1975 (age 51); Detroit, Michigan, U.S.
- Listed height: 6 ft 1 in (1.85 m)
- Listed weight: 315 lb (143 kg)

Career information
- High school: Cooley (Detroit)
- College: Eastern Michigan
- NFL draft: 1998: undrafted

Career history
- Baltimore Ravens (1998–2001); Denver Broncos (2002); Washington Redskins (2003); Kansas City Chiefs (2004–2006); Houston Texans (2006)

Awards and highlights
- Super Bowl champion (XXXV); 2× First-team All-MAC (1996, 1997)

Career NFL statistics
- Tackles: 147
- Sacks: 9
- Forced fumbles: 3
- Stats at Pro Football Reference

Lional Deshaun "Jellyroll" Dalton (born February 21, 1975) is an American former professional football player who was a defensive tackle in the National Football League (NFL). He played college football for the Eastern Michigan Eagles.

== College career ==
After attending Cooley High School, Dalton was a three-year letterman and two-year starter at Eastern Michigan University, where he twice earned All-Mid-American Conference honors and was selected co-Defensive MVP as a senior in 1997. He was also selected to play in the Hula Bowl All-Star Game. He posted 116 tackles, four sacks, and two forced fumbles in his college career.

While Eastern Michigan, Dalton became a member of Phi Beta Sigma fraternity (Zeta Epsilon chapter).

== Professional career ==
Not selected in the 1998 NFL draft, Dalton was signed as a free agent by the Baltimore Ravens and played with them through the 2001 season. He won Super Bowl XXXV with the Baltimore Ravens. He then played for the Denver Broncos in 2002, the Washington Redskins in 2003, the Kansas City Chiefs from 2004 to 2006, and the Houston Texans in 2006.

== Health issues ==
Dalton announced in 2021 that he had been diagnosed with end-stage kidney disease and needs a transplant. Due to his health issues, he's lost 120 pounds since he was first diagnosed with kidney disease. In late August 2021 he announced the successful transplant in a video on Twitter.
