= Micah Knorr =

American football player (born 1975)

No. 4
- Position: Punter

Personal information
- Born: January 9, 1975 (age 51); Orange, California, U.S.
- Listed height: 6 ft 2 in (1.88 m)
- Listed weight: 199 lb (90 kg)

Career information
- High school: Orange
- College: Utah State
- NFL draft: 2000: undrafted

Career history
- Dallas Cowboys (2000–2002); Denver Broncos (2002–2004); New York Jets (2005)*; Carolina Panthers (2006)*; Denver Broncos (2006)*; Detroit Lions (2007)*
- * Offseason or practice squad member only

Awards and highlights
- All-Big West (1995); Second-team All-Big West (1996)

Career NFL statistics
- Games played: 73
- Punts: 329
- Punting yards: 13,634
- Punting avg.: 41.4
- Stats at Pro Football Reference

Micah J. Knorr (born January 9, 1975) is an American former professional football player who was a punter in the National Football League (NFL). He was signed as an undrafted free agent by the Dallas Cowboys of the National Football League (NFL). He played college football for the Utah State Aggies.

== Early life ==
Knorr attended Orange High School in Orange, California, and was a two-time All-CIF selection. He finished his high school career with 81 points, and as a senior, averaged 42 yards per punt. He played college football at Utah State University, where he was a four-year starter at placekicker.

As a junior, he earned All-Big West honors after making 12-of-19 field goals (tying for the league lead). The next year, he received second-team All-Big West honors after making 12-of-21 field goals and 36-of-47 extra points. He finished his collegiate career with a school record of 39 field goals made.

== Professional career ==
=== Dallas Cowboys ===
After being out of football for three years, Knorr was signed by the Dallas Cowboys as an undrafted free agent after the 2000 NFL draft. He made the team because the team not only because they valued his punting skills, but he also won the kickoff and holder specialist roles.

As a rookie, he was third in the NFC with a 43.7 punting average, before suffering a hairline fracture in his lower left leg against the Cincinnati Bengals, that forced him to miss two games. He finished the season fourth in the NFC and 11th in the NFL, with a franchise rookie record of 42.8 gross punting average. His net punting average of 35.8 was fifth best in the NFC, tied for 14th in the NFL and was the fourth highest rookie mark in team history. His 17.5 touchback percentage on kickoffs was the second highest percentage in the league.

In 2001, he struggled averaging 40.2 yards per punt, but downed 25 punts inside the 20-yard line, tying for the fifth most in team history. He had greater success on kickoffs, averaging 65.8 yards, with the opponent's average starting position being the 26.8-yard line (ninth in the NFC and tying for 12th in the NFL). His best performances was when he punted 5 times for 215 yards (43.0 yards per punt average) on October 28 against Arizona, and on November 22 against Denver, when he punted 8 times for 364 yards (45.5 yards per punt avg).

He was waived on October, 22, 2002, after making a series of mistakes in critical games.

=== Denver Broncos (first stint) ===
Knorr was signed as free agent by the Denver Broncos on October 30, 2002, after the team released punter Tom Rouen. Knorr played in eight games, tying for fifth in the AFC in touchbacks (7). He punted 24 times for 906 yds. (37.8 average).

In 2003, Knorr ranked fourth in the AFC (7th NFL) in punting average (43.2 yards) and helped lead his team to the AFC wild card game. His best performances were on September 7 against the Cincinnati Bengals when he punted 5 times for 235 yards (47.0 yards avg.) and on December 28 against the Green Bay Packers, when he punted seven times for 297 yards (43.2 yards avg.). During the course of the season, he added two special teams tackles and was named as an AFC Pro Bowl Alternate.

Knorr was waived by the team on December 9, 2004, after ranking 21st in the league in gross punting average (41.5 yards) and being last in net average (34.2 yards) for the season.

=== New York Jets ===
On January 25, 2005, he was signed by the New York Jets. He was waived by the team on August 27.

=== Carolina Panthers ===
On March 10, 2006, he was signed by the Carolina Panthers. He was released by the team on June 20.

=== Denver Broncos (second stint) ===
The Denver Broncos signed on July 27, 2006. He would later be released on September 2, 2006, when the team acquired Todd Sauerbrun.

=== Detroit Lions ===
Knorr tried out for the Detroit Lions in 2007 after turning down a job as a middle school history teacher. He was released by the team on September 1.

== Personal life ==
Knorr served as a teacher and football coach at Central High School in Barstow, California.

He was featured in the book A Few Seconds of Panic.
