= Steve Herndon =

American football player (born 1977)

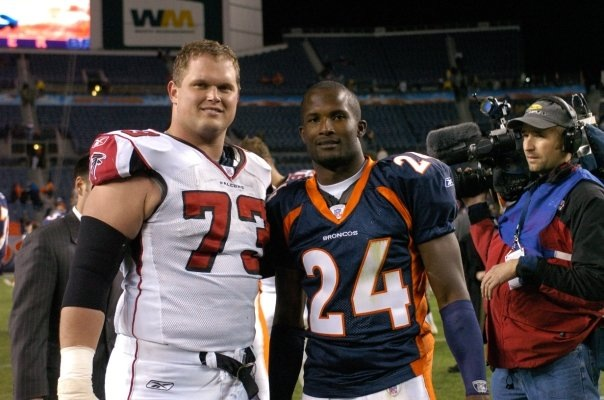
- Herndon (left) with Champ Bailey in 2004

No. 79, 73
- Position: Guard

Personal information
- Born: May 25, 1977 (age 49); LaGrange, Georgia, U.S.
- Listed height: 6 ft 4 in (1.93 m)
- Listed weight: 292 lb (132 kg)

Career information
- College: Georgia
- NFL draft: 2000: undrafted

Career history
- Miami Dolphins (2000)*; Denver Broncos (2000–2003); Atlanta Falcons (2004); Atlanta Falcons (2005)*
- * Offseason or practice squad member only

Awards and highlights
- First-team All-SEC (1999)

Career NFL statistics
- Games played: 37
- Games started: 13
- Stats at Pro Football Reference

Steven Marshall Herndon (born May 25, 1977) is an American former professional football player who was a guard in the National Football League (NFL). He played college football for the Georgia Bulldogs.

Herndon, born and raised in LaGrange, Georgia, attended high school and played on its football team with Warren Mathis, who later became rapper Bubba Sparxxx.

Herndon left the NFL in 2005 after knee and neck injuries. Herndon was most remembered for breaking Jamal Williams leg during a game against the San Diego Chargers. The block was extremely controversial and many called for Herndon to be banned for several games. Herndon was also instrumental in helping the Atlanta Falcons reach the NFC championship game in 2004 earning him the Steve Bartkowski Offensive MVP trophy. The award was given to the five starters and Herndon as he backed up every position that season. Herndon divorced in 2019. Herndon now lives with his wife Cortney Herndon and they have five children together; Lydia (23), Avery (18), John (14), Anna (12), Noah (10).
