= Jim Goodman (American football) =

American football coach, scout, and executive (born 1952)

Biographical details
- Born: May 2, 1952 (age 74); Blountstown, Florida, U.S.
- Education: Florida (B.S., 1973); University of North Alabama (M.A.)

Coaching career (HC unless noted)
- 1974–1975: Vanguard HS (FL)
- 1976–1978: North Alabama (assistant)
- 1979–1980: Marion
- 1981: Air Force (LB)
- 1982–1984: Valdosta State
- 1986–1988: Arkansas (WR/RC)
- 1994–1997: Rice (TE/ST)

Administrative career (AD unless noted)
- 1985: Valdosta State
- 1991–1993: Clemson (associate AD)
- 1998–2001: Denver Broncos (scout)
- 2002–2005: Denver Broncos (director of scouting)
- 2006–2007: Denver Broncos (director of player personnel)
- 2008: Denver Broncos (VP of FB operations)
- 2008: Denver Broncos (interim GM)

Head coaching record
- Overall: 15–16 (college)

Jim Goodman (born May 2, 1952) is an American former football coach, scout, and executive. He was served the first head football coach at Valdosta State University in Valdosta, Georgia, serving from 1982 to 1984, compiling a record of 15–16. Goodman was the interim general manager of the Denver Broncos of the National Football League (NFL) in 2008.
