= Dorsett Davis =

American gridiron football player (born 1979)

No. 96
- Positions: Defensive end, defensive tackle

Personal information
- Born: January 24, 1979 (age 47); Shelby, Mississippi, U.S.
- Listed height: 6 ft 5 in (1.96 m)
- Listed weight: 305 lb (138 kg)

Career information
- High school: Cleveland (MS) East Side
- College: Mississippi State
- NFL draft: 2002: 3rd round, 96th overall pick

Career history
- Denver Broncos (2002–2004); Edmonton Eskimos (2006)

Career NFL statistics
- Tackles: 16
- Passes defended: 1
- Stats at Pro Football Reference

Dorsett Terrell Davis (born January 24, 1979) is an American former professional football player who was a defensive end in the National Football League (NFL). He was selected by the Denver Broncos in the third round of the 2002 NFL draft with the 96th overall pick. He played college football for the Mississippi State Bulldogs.

Davis also played for the Edmonton Eskimos.

Since his playing career ended, Davis has coached at Mississippi Gulf Coast Community College, Mississippi Valley State University, and Jackson State University.
