= Willie Middlebrooks =

American football player (born 1979)

No. 23, 25
- Position: Cornerback

Personal information
- Born: February 12, 1979 (age 47); Miami, Florida, U.S.
- Listed height: 6 ft 1 in (1.85 m)
- Listed weight: 200 lb (91 kg)

Career information
- College: Minnesota
- NFL draft: 2001: 1st round, 24th overall pick

Career history
- 2001–2004: Denver Broncos
- 2005: San Francisco 49ers
- 2006: Denver Broncos*
- 2008–2010: Toronto Argonauts
- * Offseason or practice squad member only

Awards and highlights
- First-team All-Big Ten (2000); Second-team All-Big Ten (1999)
- Stats at Pro Football Reference
- Stats at CFL.ca

Willie Frank Middlebrooks (born February 12, 1979) is an American former professional football player who was a cornerback in the National Football League (NFL) and Canadian Football League (CFL).

Middlebrooks was named first-team all-state as a senior at Homestead High School in Homestead, Florida. He played college football for the Minnesota Golden Gophers. In 1999, he was named Second-Team All-Big Ten. In 2000, he was named First-Team All-Big Ten Conference, but missed the final four games of the season with a fractured ankle. Prior to the 2001 NFL Draft, he was regarded as the best man-coverage player in the Big Ten, with speculation that he would be drafted in the first round, despite his recent injury.

He was the 24th overall pick of the Denver Broncos in the 2001 NFL draft. He began his career with the Broncos, then played for the San Francisco 49ers before returning to Denver in 2006.

Middlebrooks signed as a free agent with the Argonauts on April 28, 2008. He was named defensive player of Week One of the 2008 CFL season with nine tackles and an interception of a long pass from Winnipeg's Kevin Glenn near the end of the fourth quarter.

On June 1, 2011, Middlebrooks announced his retirement after sustaining a serious neck injury he received nearing the end of the 2010 CFL season.
