= Chris Young (American football) =

American football player (born 1980)

Profile
- Position: Safety

Personal information
- Born: January 23, 1980 (age 46); Senoia, Georgia, U.S.
- Listed height: 6 ft 0 in (1.83 m)
- Listed weight: 210 lb (95 kg)

Career information
- High school: Sharpsburg (GA) East Coweta
- College: Georgia Tech
- NFL draft: 2002: 7th round, 228th overall pick

Career history
- Denver Broncos (2002–2005)
- Stats at Pro Football Reference

Christopher Lamont Young (born January 23, 1980) is an American former professional football safety who played for the Denver Broncos of the National Football League (NFL).

== Career ==
Young was a three-year starter at Georgia Tech. He started with 35 consecutive games, beginning with the final game of his true freshman season. He was also a team captain. Young finished his career ranked 10th among all-time Georgia Tech defensive backs in career tackles with 219. He was drafted in the 2002 NFL draft by the Broncos.
