= Charlie Adams (American football) =

American football player (born 1979)

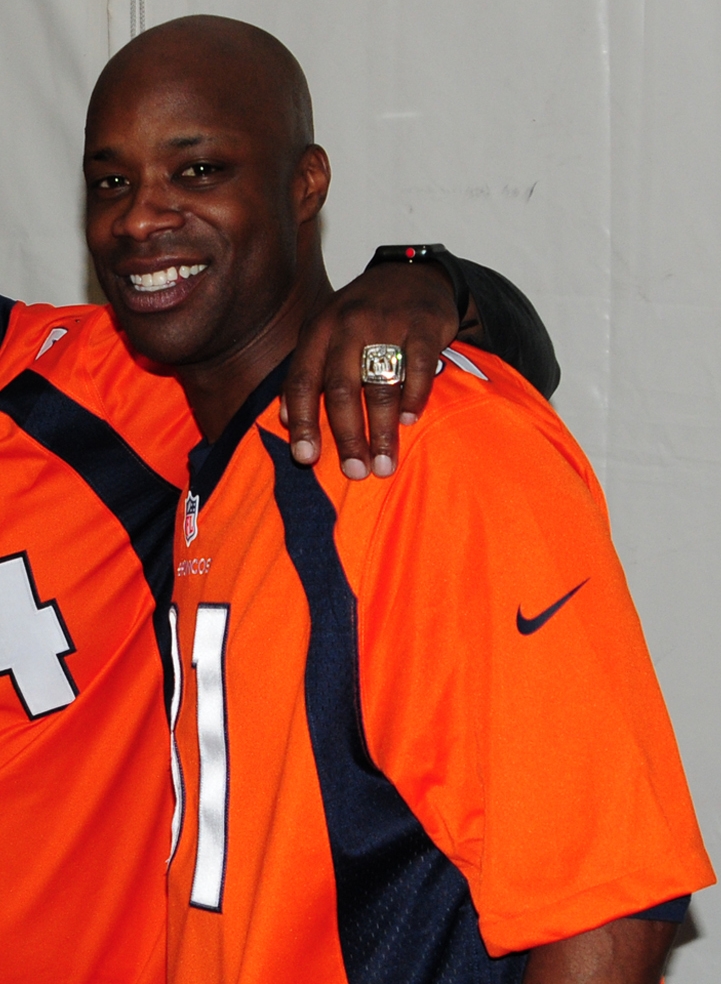
- Adams in 2019

No. 12, 19, 81
- Position: Wide receiver

Personal information
- Born: October 23, 1979 (age 47); Camp Hill, Pennsylvania, U.S.
- Listed height: 6 ft 2 in (1.88 m)
- Listed weight: 190 lb (86 kg)

Career information
- High school: Cumberland Valley (Mechanicsburg, Pennsylvania)
- College: Hofstra
- NFL draft: 2002: undrafted

Career history
- Denver Broncos (2002–2005); Houston Texans (2006)

Career NFL statistics
- Receptions: 21
- Receiving yards: 203
- Return yards: 393
- Stats at Pro Football Reference

Charlie Adams (born October 23, 1979) is an American former professional football player who was a wide receiver in the National Football League (NFL). He played college football for the Hofstra Pride.

== Early life ==
Charlie Adams was a standout in football and track & field at Cumberland Valley High School in Mechanicsburg, Pennsylvania. He went on to Hofstra University where set records as the all-time leading receiver in school history, records previously held by Wayne Chrebet and Steven Jackson. New Orleans Saints Marques Colston (who is also from Central Pennsylvania) is the latest to hold the all-time yards record at Hofstra.

== Professional career ==
Adams was signed as a college free agent in 2003 by the Denver Broncos. He beat out Jerry Rice for the last Wideout position. Adams was signed in December 2006 by the Houston Texans, but was then released by the team on August 26, 2007.
