= Sam Brandon =

American football player (born 1979)

Profile
- Position: Safety

Personal information
- Born: July 5, 1979 (age 47); Toledo, Ohio, U.S.
- Listed height: 6 ft 2 in (1.88 m)
- Listed weight: 200 lb (91 kg)

Career information
- High school: Riverside (CA) North
- College: UNLV
- NFL draft: 2002: 4th round, 131st overall pick

Career history
- Denver Broncos (2002–2006)

Awards and highlights
- First-team All-MW (2001)
- Stats at Pro Football Reference

Samuel Terrill Brandon (born July 5, 1979) is an American former professional football safety. He was selected by the Denver Broncos in the fourth round of the 2002 NFL draft after playing college football for UNLV. He played five seasons in the National Football League (NFL), all of which were for the Broncos.
