= Ted Sundquist =

Personal information
- Born: May 1, 1962 (age 64); Houston, Texas, U.S.

Career information
- High school: Spring Woods (Houston)
- College: USAF Academy (Undergraduate); University of Colorado (Master's Degree)

Career history

Coaching
- United States Air Force Academy Prep School (1990–1992) (Head coach); United States Air Force Academy (1988–1990) (Assistant coach)

Operations
- Denver Broncos (2002–2008) (General manager)

Awards and highlights
- 2× Super Bowl champion (XXXII, XXXIII)
- Executive profile at Pro Football Reference

Carl Mathew Theodore Sundquist II (born May 1, 1962) is an American football player, manager and commentator. He spent sixteen years working in the National Football League (NFL) for the Denver Broncos franchise. Sundquist was hired in 1992 as the player personnel assistant, and two years later promoted to director of college scouting. In 2001, Pat Bowlen promoted Sundquist to general manager.

== Early life and education ==
Sundquist was born in Houston, Texas and attended Spring Woods High School in Houston, Texas, where he played football, and was a teammate of future Major League Baseball pitcher Roger Clemens. He has a Master in Public Administration from the University of Colorado, Colorado Springs, a Bachelor of Science in Soviet Area Studies from the United States Air Force Academy.

== College football ==
Sundquist graduated in 1984 from the United States Air Force Academy, located in Colorado Springs, Colorado where he played fullback for the Falcon football team. He was team captain in 1983. The Falcons had bowl victories over Vanderbilt (1982 Hall of Fame Bowl) & Mississippi (1983 Independence Bowl) while Sundquist was on the team. Sundquist returned to Air Force as an assistant coach in 1989, and named head coach of the United States Air Force Academy Prep School from 1990 to 1992.

== Bobsled ==
During his posting in Berlin, Sundquist trained for and became a member of the 1984-1988 U.S. National Bobsled Team. Sundquist competed in the 1988 Olympic trials, but they were cut short due to a shoulder injury.

== NFL executive ==
=== Denver Broncos ===
Sundquist joined the Broncos in 1993 as a scout as player personnel assistant (1992–1994), director of scouting from 1995 to 2001 and then promoted to general manager, where he stayed during six years from 2002 to 2008.

At the age of 33 Sundquist served as college scouting director and was in that role during the Broncos' back-to-back Super Bowl wins in 1997 and 1998. He supervised pro and college scouting, and was responsible for salary cap and contract analysis. Sundquist was promoted to GM in 2002 by owner Pat Bowlen after being pursued by both the Chicago Bears and Atlanta Falcons organizations. He was also a finalist for the president position with the Seattle Seahawks in 2004. He started at GM with five consecutive winning seasons, a franchise record. Sundquist left the Broncos following a 7–9 record in 2007 Denver Broncos season. Denver reached the playoffs three times under Sundquist being manager. Sundquist helped Denver attract free agents such as John Lynch, Daniel Graham and Travis Henry.

=== Acquired Talent ===
During his tenure, Sundquist helped Denver acquire players such as John Lynch, Daniel Graham, Al Wilson, John Mobley, Brandon Marshall, Mike Anderson, Olandis Gary, Clinton Portis (WAS), Reggie Hayward (JAX), Trevor Pryce (BAL), Brian Griese (TB), Deltha O'Neal (NE), and Nick Harris (DET). Sundquist was known for being one of the more active GMs in player acquisition through drafting, signing free agents and trades.

Under Sundquist, the Broncos became one of the league's most active traders. His most notable move came just before the 2004 season, when he dealt star running back Clinton Portis to the Washington Redskins in exchange for cornerback Champ Bailey, another to obtain Dre Bly from the Detroit Lions, and a No. 2 draft pick that turned out to be Tatum Bell. He also engineered a 2006 draft-day deal with St. Louis allowing Denver to move from the No. 29 overall pick to No. 11, where they selected Vanderbilt quarterback Jay Cutler. As a result, Sundquist's GM term was the start of a franchise-record five consecutive winning seasons.

=== Post-Broncos career ===
In the 2008-2009 football season, Sundquist worked as an expert analyst and editorial commentator with ProFootballTalk.com. In early 2009, Sundquist was mentioned in several general manager searches across the National Football League, including the Kansas City Chiefs who interviewed Sundquist for their open GM position. In December 2010, Sundquist interviewed for the open GM position with the San Francisco 49ers. Sundquist was also a candidate included in the New York Jets 2013 GM search. Sundquist released his first book on June 7, 2013, titled Taking Your Team to the Top: How to Build and Manage Great Teams like the Pros. In his book he describes the bases needed to discover persons' abilities and talents while adding to team cooperation to achieve any business goal.

From 2008 to 2013 he was a member of the board of directors for the Air Force Academy Athletic Foundation which supports the programs of the Athletic Department of the United States Air Force Academy. In 2010 he also was a director of player personnel for the Omaha Nighthawks in the UFL.
