= Monsanto Pope =

American football player (born 1978)

No. 75
- Position: Defensive tackle

Personal information
- Born: January 27, 1978 (age 48); Norfolk, Virginia, U.S.
- Listed height: 6 ft 3 in (1.91 m)
- Listed weight: 300 lb (136 kg)

Career information
- High school: Hopewell (VA)
- College: Virginia
- NFL draft: 2002: 7th round, 231st overall pick

Career history
- Denver Broncos (2002–2005); New York Jets (2006)*
- * Offseason or practice squad member only

Career NFL statistics
- Games played: 48
- Games started: 21
- Tackles: 49
- Sacks: 6
- Stats at Pro Football Reference

Monsanto Leshawn Pope (born January 27, 1978) is an American former professional football player who was a defensive tackle in the National Football League (NFL). He played college football for the Virginia Cavaliers and was selected by the Denver Broncos in the seventh round of the 2002 NFL draft. He played four seasons for the Broncos from 2002 to 2005, before signing as a free agent with the New York Jets in 2006. He left the team at the beginning of training camp.
