= Donnie Spragan =

American football player (born 1976)

No. 59
- Position: Linebacker

Personal information
- Born: July 12, 1976 (age 50); Oakland, California, U.S.
- Listed height: 6 ft 3 in (1.91 m)
- Listed weight: 242 lb (110 kg)

Career information
- High school: Logan (Union City, California)
- College: Stanford
- NFL draft: 1999: undrafted

Career history
- New Orleans Saints (1999); Amsterdam Admirals (2001); Green Bay Packers (2001)*; Cleveland Browns (2001)*; Denver Broncos (2001–2004); Miami Dolphins (2005–2007); Buffalo Bills (2008)*
- * Offseason or practice squad member only

Awards and highlights
- Second-team All-Pac-10 (1998); East West Shrine Bowl MVP (1998-99)

Career NFL statistics
- Total tackles: 278
- Sacks: 3.5
- Forced fumbles: 4
- Fumble recoveries: 6
- Interceptions: 1
- Stats at Pro Football Reference

Donnie Spragan Jr. (born July 12, 1976) is an American former professional football player who was a linebacker in the National Football League (NFL). He played college football for the Pacific Tigers and Stanford Cardinal. Spragan was signed by the New Orleans Saints as an undrafted free agent in 1999. He was also a member of the Green Bay Packers, Cleveland Browns, Denver Broncos, Miami Dolphins, and Buffalo Bills.

== Early life ==
Spragan attended James Logan High School in Union City, California, where he lettered in football, basketball, and baseball. In football, he won All-League honors at both quarterback and linebacker. Spragan attended the University of the Pacific in Stockton, California, and played football there for Chuck Shelton. When Pacific dropped their program after the 1995 season, Spragan transferred to Stanford University.

== Professional career ==
=== Early career ===
Spragan signed as undrafted free agent with the New Orleans Saints but was released after he injured his knee during pre-season. He spent the 1999 and 2000 seasons recovering from injury.

He signed as free agent with the Amsterdam Admirals of NFL Europe, where he started all ten games and posted 44 tackles, 3,5 sacks, 2 forced fumbles and 5 special teams tackles. He was then picked up by the Green Bay Packers on July 19, but was released on September 2 at the end of the preseason. He was added to the Cleveland Browns' practice squad on October, 2, but was released from the practice squad on October 31.

=== Denver Broncos ===
Spragan was signed to the Denver Broncos' practice squad on December 11, 2001. He remained there through the end of the season, and was then re-signed by the Denver Broncos in the offseason He was active for the entire 2002 season, posting 12 tackles in total of which 2 were assisted. He also forced a fumble.

Spragan appeared in all 16 games for the Denver Broncos in 2003. He was moved to strong safety for a game against the New England Patriots. He posted 54 tackles in total of which 10 were assisted, 3 passes defended, 1 forced fumble and 3 fumbles recovered for a total of 9 yards.

Spragan appeared in all 16 games for the Denver Broncos yet again in 2004, starting 14 at outside linebacker. He recorded a total of 67 tackles of which 22 were assisted, one sack, 5 passes defended, one forced fumble and one fumble recovered.

=== Miami Dolphins ===
Signed a two-year deal worth $2 million with the Miami Dolphins. Posted 53 tackles (38 solo), one sack, one interception, two passes defended and one forced fumble.

Appeared in all 16 games for the Miami Dolphins posting 50 tackles of which 22 were assisted, 1.5 sack, 3 passes defended, one forced fumble and one fumble recovered.

On April 25, 2007, he re-signed with the Dolphins.

=== Buffalo Bills ===
A free agent in the 2008 offseason, Spragan signed with the Buffalo Bills on August 2 after rookie linebacker Alvin Bowen suffered what appears to be a serious knee injury. He was released on August 30, 2008.
