= Jashon Sykes =

American football player (born 1979)

San Diego State Aztecs
- Position: Assistant athletic director for football operations

Personal information
- Born: September 25, 1979 (age 47); Los Angeles, California, U.S.
- Listed height: 6 ft 2 in (1.88 m)
- Listed weight: 236 lb (107 kg)

Career information
- High school: Junípero Serra (Gardena, California)
- College: Colorado
- NFL draft: 2002: undrafted

Career history
- Denver Broncos (2002–2004); Washington Redskins (2006)

Awards and highlights
- Second-team All-Big 12 (1999)
- Stats at Pro Football Reference

Jashon Karlfred Sykes (born September 25, 1979) is an American former professional football player who was a linebacker in the National Football League (NFL). He played college football for the Colorado Buffaloes, and was subsequently signed by the Denver Broncos. He started 11 games during his career with the Broncos.

After his playing career, Sykes became a recruiting and operations assistant with Colorado football in 2006. In 2007 and 2008, Sykes was on-campus recruiting director for Colorado and training camp assistant coach with the Broncos. From 2009 to 2010, Sykes was the assistant operations director and coordinator of football relations at Colorado. From 2011 to 2012, Sykes was director of football operations at Colorado. Beginning in 2013, Sykes was director of football operations at San Diego State.
