= 2005 Denver Broncos season =

American football team season

- Owner: Pat Bowlen
- General manager: Ted Sundquist and Mike Shanahan
- President: Pat Bowlen
- Head coach: Mike Shanahan
- Offensive coordinator: Gary Kubiak
- Defensive coordinator: Larry Coyer
- Home stadium: Invesco Field at Mile High

Results
- Record: 13–3
- Division place: 1st AFC West
- Playoffs: Won Divisional Playoffs (vs. Patriots) 27–13; Lost AFC Championship (vs. Steelers) 17–34
- Pro Bowlers: QB Jake Plummer; WR Rod Smith; FS John Lynch; CB Champ Bailey; MLB Al Wilson

The 2005 season was the Denver Broncos' 36th in the National Football League (NFL) and their 46th overall. The Broncos closed out the 2005 regular season with a 13–3 record. They won their first playoff game since the 1998 season. Although they eliminated the defending back-to-back Super Bowl champion New England Patriots to end their hopes of becoming the first NFL team to three-peat, and became the first team to eliminate a defending back-to-back Super Bowl champion in the playoffs since the 1994 San Francisco 49ers (which Mike Shanahan was coincidentally the offensive coordinator), they failed to get to the Super Bowl, losing to the Pittsburgh Steelers, the eventual champions, in the AFC Championship game. The Broncos were expected by many to make the Super Bowl for the first time in the post-John Elway era. Denver wouldn't make the playoffs again until 2011 under Tim Tebow's leadership or another Conference championship until 2013, under the leadership of Peyton Manning whom the Broncos signed in 2012.

== 2005 season ==
After losing their first game 34–10 to the Miami Dolphins on September 11, the Broncos won 5 straight games, defeating the San Diego Chargers 20–17, the Kansas City Chiefs 30–10, the Jacksonville Jaguars 20–7, the Washington Redskins 21–19, and the two-time defending champion New England Patriots 28–20 on October 16 before losing to the New York Giants on October 23 by a final score of 24–23, courtesy of an Amani Toomer touchdown much like the Broncos 1998 season where they suffered their first loss of the year. They then beat the defending NFC champion Philadelphia Eagles 49–21 on October 30. In that game, the Broncos became the first team in NFL history to have two players, Mike Anderson and Tatum Bell, rush for over 100 yards and another player, Jake Plummer, pass for over 300 yards in a single game. They then beat the Oakland Raiders on November 13, 31–17. They beat the New York Jets on November 20, 27–0. It was the first time the Broncos had shut out a team at home since the Carolina Panthers on November 9, 1997. They played the Dallas Cowboys on Thanksgiving day, November 24, winning a very hard fought game in overtime 24–21. The key play that led to Jason Elam's 24-yard game-winning field goal was a 55-yard run by Ron Dayne who filled in for the injured Tatum Bell. They lost to the Chiefs 31–27 on December 4, but defeated the Baltimore Ravens the following week 12–10. On December 17, the Broncos defeated the Buffalo Bills 28–17. On Christmas Eve 2005, the Denver Broncos clinched the AFC West division title as they finished 8–0 at Invesco Field, beating the Oakland Raiders 22–3. On December 31, 2005, the Broncos got win number 13 by going on the road and sweeping their division rivals, the Chargers, with a final score of 23–7.

The Broncos entered their third consecutive year in the playoffs with the momentum of a four-game winning streak. With a record of 13–3, they were tied with the Seattle Seahawks for second overall in the league, behind the 14–2 Indianapolis Colts. They were seeded number two in the AFC behind the Colts. On January 14, 2006, the Broncos defeated the two-time defending champions, the New England Patriots, 27–13, ending the Patriots chance of becoming the first NFL team ever to win three consecutive Super Bowl championships. The last team with a chance of winning three consecutive Super Bowls before the Patriots were the Broncos themselves. The Broncos' run came to an end by losing to the Pittsburgh Steelers in the AFC Championship 34–17 on January 22, 2006. Their strength of controlling the ball collapsed with 4 turnovers. They were outscored in the first half 24–3 and were not able to come from behind to win in the second half. The Steelers went on to win Super Bowl XL.

== Offseason ==
The Broncos failed to retain safety Kenoy Kennedy, who signed with the Detroit Lions, defensive end Reggie Hayward, who signed with the Jacksonville Jaguars and cornerback Kelly Herndon, who signed with the Seattle Seahawks, and offensive guard P.J. Alexander was released before the start of regular season. Also running back Garrison Hearst and offensive tackle Dan Neil were released and eventually retired.

During the offseason, the Broncos brought back Keith Burns and Ian Gold after one season with the Tampa Bay Buccaneers. Also trading running back Reuben Droughns to the Cleveland Browns for defensive end Ebenezer Ekuban and Michael Myers, also signing defensive end Courtney Brown and Gerard Warren as the former Browns were known to be the "Browncos". Including the signing of 49ers defensive end John Engelberger and New York Giants running back Ron Dayne.

Future Pro Football Hall of Fame wide receiver Jerry Rice suited up for the Broncos in four preseason games, catching four passes for 24 yards. He retired before the start of the regular season.

=== NFL draft ===
2005 Denver Broncos draft
Round	Pick	Player	Position	College	Notes
2	56	Darrent Williams	Cornerback	Oklahoma State	(deceased)
3	76	Karl Paymah	Cornerback	Washington State	from Washington
3	97	Domonique Foxworth	Cornerback	Maryland	
3	101	Maurice Clarett	Running back	Ohio State	
6	200	Chris Myers *	Guard	Miami (FL)	
7	239	Paul Ernster	Kicker	Northern Arizona	
Made roster * Made at least one Pro Bowl during career

== Personnel ==
=== Staff / Coaches ===
2005 Denver Broncos staff
Front office: President and chief executive officer – Pat Bowlen; Head coaches: Executive vice president of football operations/head coach – Mike Shanahan; Assistant to head coach – Troy Calhoun; Offensive coaches: Offensive coordinator – Gary Kubiak; Quarterbacks – Pat McPherson; Running backs – Bobby Turner; Wide receivers – Steve Watson; Tight ends – Tim Brewster; Offensive line – Rick Dennison; Coaching intern – Mike McDaniel	Defensive coaches: Defensive coordinator – Larry Coyer; Defensive line/ends – Jacob Burney; Defensive line/tackles – Andre Patterson; Linebackers – Kirk Doll; Defensive backs – Bob Slowik; Assistant defensive backs – Jimmy Spencer; Defensive assistant – Jim Ryan; Defensive assistant – Ryan Slowik; Special teams coaches: Special teams – Ronnie Bradford; Special teams assistant – Thomas McGaughey; Strength and conditioning: Strength and conditioning – Rich Tuten; Assistant strength and conditioning – Greg Saporta; Assistant strength and conditioning – Cedric Smith

=== Roster ===
2005 Denver Broncos roster
Quarterbacks (QB): 16 Jake Plummer; 11 Bradlee Van Pelt; Running backs (RB): 38 Mike Anderson; 26 Tatum Bell; 33 Ron Dayne; 39 Kyle Johnson FB; 37 Cecil Sapp FB; Wide receivers (WR): 81 Charlie Adams; 14 Todd Devoe; 85 Ashley Lelie; 80 Rod Smith; 13 David Terrell; 17 Darius Watts; Tight ends (TE): 82 Stephen Alexander; 84 Wesley Duke; 89 Nate Jackson; 88 Jeb Putzier	Offensive linemen (OL): 65 Cooper Carlisle G; 72 George Foster OT; 74 Cornell Green OT; 50 Ben Hamilton G; 78 Matt Lepsis OT; 62 Chris Myers C/G; 66 Tom Nalen C; 59 Taylor Whitley G; Defensive linemen (DL): 98 Courtney Brown DE; 95 Marco Coleman DE; 91 Ebenezer Ekuban DE; 60 John Engelberger DE; 96 Michael Myers DT; 75 Monsanto Pope DT; 93 Trevor Pryce DE; 61 Gerard Warren DT; 97 Demetrin Veal DT	Linebackers (LB): 51 Keith Burns MLB; 54 Patrick Chukwurah OLB; 52 Ian Gold OLB; 53 Louis Green OLB; 56 Al Wilson MLB; 55 D.J. Williams OLB; Defensive backs (DB): 21 Hamza Abdullah FS; 45 Roc Alexander CB; 24 Champ Bailey CB; 42 Sam Brandon FS; 40 Curome Cox CB; 25 Nick Ferguson SS; 22 Domonique Foxworth CB; 47 John Lynch FS; 41 Karl Paymah CB; 27 Darrent Williams CB; Special teams (ST): 1 Jason Elam K; 83 Mike Leach LS; 10 Todd Sauerbrun P	Practice squad: 57 Josh Buhl OLB; 34 Cedric Cobbs RB; 3 Paul Ernster K (IR); 99 George Gause DE; 63 Rob Hunt C; 90 Corey Jackson DE; 71 Patrice Mwamba DT ^{Int'l}; 48 Brandon Miree FB; 64 Erik Pears OT; 35 Antwaun Rogers CB; Reserve: 69 P. J. Alexander C (NF-Inj.); 29 Brandon Browner CB (IR); 77 Dwayne Carswell G (NF-Inj.); 28 Jeff Shoate CB (IR); 32 Chris Young S (IR); Rookies in italics 53 active, 6 reserve, 9 practice squad

== Schedule ==
=== Preseason ===
Week	Date	Opponent	Result	Record	Venue
1	August 13	at Houston Texans	**W** 20–14	1–0	Reliant Stadium
2	August 20	San Francisco 49ers	**W** 26–21	2–0	Invesco Field at Mile High
3	August 27	Indianapolis Colts	**W** 37–24	3–0	Invesco Field at Mile High
4	September 2	at Arizona Cardinals	**W** 30–21	4–0	Sun Devil Stadium

=== Regular season ===
Week	Date	Opponent	Result	Record	Venue	Attendance
1	September 11	at Miami Dolphins	**L** 10–34	0–1	Dolphins Stadium	72,324
2	September 18	**San Diego Chargers**	**W** 20–17	1–1	Invesco Field at Mile High	75,310
3	September 26	**Kansas City Chiefs**	**W** 30–10	2–1	Invesco Field at Mile High	76,381
4	October 2	at Jacksonville Jaguars	**W** 20–7	3–1	Alltel Stadium	66,045
5	October 9	Washington Redskins	**W** 21–19	4–1	Invesco Field at Mile High	75,880
6	October 16	New England Patriots	**W** 28–20	5–1	Invesco Field at Mile High	76,571
7	October 23	at New York Giants	**L** 23–24	5–2	Giants Stadium	78,516
8	October 30	Philadelphia Eagles	**W** 49–21	6–2	Invesco Field at Mile High	76,530
9	Bye					
10	November 13	at **Oakland Raiders**	**W** 31–17	7–2	McAfee Coliseum	62,779
11	November 20	New York Jets	**W** 27–0	8–2	Invesco Field at Mile High	76,255
12	November 24	at Dallas Cowboys	**W** 24–21 (OT)	9–2	Texas Stadium	63,273
13	December 4	at **Kansas City Chiefs**	**L** 27–31	9–3	Arrowhead Stadium	78,261
14	December 11	Baltimore Ravens	**W** 12–10	10–3	Invesco Field at Mile High	75,651
15	December 17	at Buffalo Bills	**W** 28–17	11–3	Ralph Wilson Stadium	71,887
16	December 24	**Oakland Raiders**	**W** 22–3	12–3	Invesco Field at Mile High	76,212
17	December 31	at **San Diego Chargers**	**W** 23–7	13–3	Qualcomm Stadium	65,513
Note: Intra-division opponents are in **bold** text.

=== Playoffs ===
Week	Date	Opponent	Result	Record	Venue	Attendance
Divisional Round	January 14, 2006	New England Patriots	**W** 27–13	1–0	Invesco Field at Mile High	76,238
AFC Championship	January 22, 2006	Pittsburgh Steelers	**L** 17–34	1–1	Invesco Field at Mile High	76,775

== Standings ==
AFC West
	W	L	T	PCT	DIV	CONF	PF	PA	STK
^{(2)} Denver Broncos	13	3	0	.813	5–1	10–2	395	258	W4
Kansas City Chiefs	10	6	0	.625	4–2	9–3	403	325	W2
San Diego Chargers	9	7	0	.563	3–3	7–5	418	312	L2
Oakland Raiders	4	12	0	.250	0–6	2–10	290	383	L6

== Playoff results ==
=== AFC Divisional Game vs New England Patriots ===
AFC Divisional Playoff: New England Patriots vs Denver Broncos – Game summary

Quarter	1	2	3	4	Total
Patriots	0	3	3	7	13
Broncos	0	10	7	10	27

at Invesco Field at Mile High, Denver, CO

- Date: January 14, 2006
- Game time: 6:00 p.m. MT
- Game weather: 54 °F or 12.2 °C, wind 3 miles per hour (4.8 km/h; 2.6 kn)
- TV: CBS

Game information

First quarter no scoring Second quarter

- NE – Adam Vinatieri 40 yard field goal. (2:48) Patriots 3–0
- Den – Mike Anderson 1 yard rush (Jason Elam kick). (1:42) Broncos 7–3
- Den – Jason Elam 50 yard field goal. (0:43) Broncos 10–3

Third quarter

- NE – Adam Vinatieri 32 yard field goal. (7:49) Broncos 10–6
- Den – Mike Anderson 1 yard rush (Jason Elam kick). (0:43) Broncos 17–6

Fourth quarter

- Den – Rod Smith 4 yard pass from Jake Plummer (Jason Elam kick). (8:38) Broncos 24–6
- NE – David Givens 4 yard pass from Tom Brady (Adam Vinatieri kick). (8:05) Broncos 24–13
- Den – Jason Elam 34 yard field goal. (3:20) Broncos 27–13

Patriots

- Tom Brady: 20–36, 341 yards, 1 TD, 2 INT
- Deion Branch: 8 rec, 153 yards

Broncos

- Jake Plummer: 15–26, 197 yards, 1 TD, 1 INT
- Rod Smith: 6 rec, 96 yards, 1 TD

Turnovers

- Patriots – 5
- Broncos – 1

Despite scoring 27 points on offense, the Broncos defense was the story of the day. They forced five turnovers: two interceptions by Tom Brady and three fumbles. A Mike Anderson touchdown run in the third quarter was set up by a 100-yard interception return by Champ Bailey. It was the second longest interception return in playoff history. New England outgained Denver 420 to 286 in yardage, but the turnovers were too much for the Patriots to overcome. As a result, the Broncos secured their first divisional round win since 1998.

=== AFC Championship Game vs Pittsburgh Steelers ===
AFC Championship Game: Pittsburgh Steelers vs Denver Broncos – Game summary

Quarter	1	2	3	4	Total
Steelers	3	21	0	10	34
Broncos	0	3	7	7	17

at Invesco Field at Mile High, Denver, CO

- Date: January 22, 2006
- Game time: 1:00 p.m. MT
- Game weather: 34 °F or 1.1 °C
- TV: CBS

This would be both the Broncos' last playoff game until 2011 and their last loss in the AFC Championship until 2025.

== Team stats ==
The Broncos relied on a more consistent Jake Plummer, their running game behind Tatum Bell, Ron Dayne, and Mike Anderson, and their defense to stop opposing running backs. The Broncos placed second in the league in rushing yards per game, fourth in total offense and allowed the second fewest rushing yards in the league.

The key to Denver's success that year was their ability to keep control of the ball. In the regular season they committed just 16 turnovers, tied for the second-least in the league, and took it away from their opponents 36 times, fifth-best in the league. This resulted in a turnover differential of +20, second-best in the NFL. Jake Plummer, after throwing an NFL-high-tying 20 interceptions in the 2004 season, threw only 7 interceptions on the year, and had the second-lowest interception percentage rate of any quarterback in the league (behind Brad Johnson). His only omission of a serious number of turnovers occurred, unfortunately, in the AFC Championship, with two interceptions.

In 2005 the Broncos had 5,766 total offensive yards and gave up 5,006 yards. They outran their opponents 2,539 to 1,363. They were, however, outpassed 3,643 to 3,227. They had 28 sacks and gave up 23. They had 46 touchdowns to their opponents' 31. They were tied for fifth in total touchdowns and were seventh in the league in points per game.

== Player stats ==
Jake Plummer threw 277 completions out of 456 attempts for 3366 yards and 18 touchdowns. He had 7 interceptions and a quarterback rating of 90.2. He also ran 46 times for 151 yards and 2 touchdowns.

Mike Anderson had 239 rushes for 1014 yards and 12 touchdowns. Tatum Bell ran 173 times for 921 yards and 8 touchdowns. He also had 18 catches and 104 receiving yards. Ron Dayne had 53 carries for 270 yards. He also had 18 receptions for 212 yards.

Rod Smith led in receiving with 85 receptions for 1105 yards and 6 touchdowns. Ashley Lelie had 42 receptions, 770 yards, and 1 touchdown. Jeb Putzier made 37 catches for 481 yards. Charlie Adams had 21 receptions and 203 yards.

Ian Gold had 72 tackles, 16 assists, 3 sacks and 2 fumble recoveries. Nick Ferguson made 61 tackles and had 18 assists and 1 fumble recovery. Al Wilson had 61 tackles, 11 assists, 3 sacks and 1 fumble recovery. Domonique Foxworth made 64 tackles, had 6 assists and 2 fumble recoveries. Champ Bailey had 8 interceptions and 2 touchdowns, 59 tackles and 5 assists. John Lynch had 44 tackles, 17 assists, and 4 sacks.

Jason Elam kicked 24 field goals out of 32 attempted and 43 out of 44 extra points.
