= Champ Bailey =

American football player (born 1978)

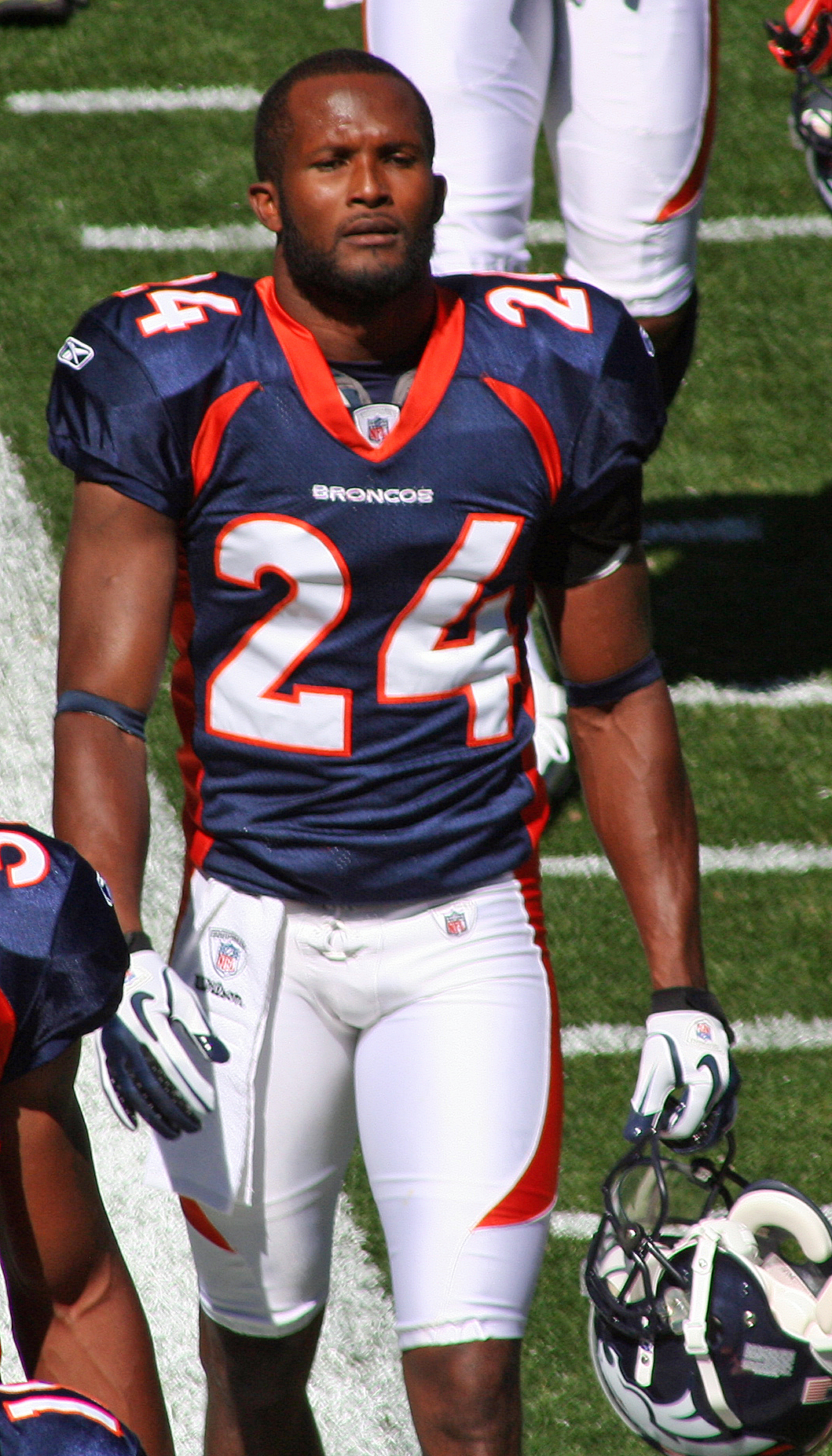
- Bailey with the Denver Broncos in 2010

No. 24
- Position: Cornerback

Personal information
- Born: June 22, 1978 (age 48); Fort Campbell, Kentucky, U.S.
- Listed height: 6 ft 0 in (1.83 m)
- Listed weight: 192 lb (87 kg)

Career information
- High school: Charlton County (Folkston, Georgia)
- College: Georgia (1996–1998)
- NFL draft: 1999: 1st round, 7th overall pick

Career history
- Washington Redskins (1999–2003); Denver Broncos (2004–2013); New Orleans Saints (2014)*
- * Offseason or practice squad member only

Awards and highlights
- 3× First-team All-Pro (2004–2006); 4× Second-team All-Pro (2000, 2003, 2007, 2012); 12× Pro Bowl (2000–2007, 2009–2012); NFL interceptions leader (2006); NFL 2000s All-Decade Team; PFWA All-Rookie Team (1999); Washington Commanders 90 Greatest; Denver Broncos 50th Anniversary Team; Denver Broncos Ring of Fame; Bronko Nagurski Trophy (1998); Consensus All-American (1998); 2× First-team All-SEC (1997, 1998); Second-team AP All-Time All-American (2025); NFL record: Most pass deflections: 203

Career NFL statistics
- Total tackles: 931
- Interceptions: 52
- Interception yards: 464
- Pass deflections: 203
- Forced fumbles: 7
- Fumble recoveries: 6
- Sacks: 3
- Total touchdowns: 5
- Stats at Pro Football Reference
- Pro Football Hall of Fame
- College Football Hall of Fame

Roland "Champ" Bailey Jr. (born June 22, 1978) is an American former professional football player who was a cornerback in the National Football League (NFL). He played college football for the Georgia Bulldogs, where he earned consensus All-American honors, and was selected by the Washington Redskins in the first round of the 1999 NFL draft.

In 2004, Bailey was traded to the Denver Broncos, where he played for ten seasons until he was released in early 2014, following the Broncos' Super Bowl XLVIII loss. Bailey signed with the New Orleans Saints as a free agent shortly afterward but was released before the start of the regular season. In October 2014, Bailey announced his retirement from the NFL after 15 seasons. He was selected to 12 Pro Bowls in his career, the most ever for a cornerback. He holds the current NFL record for most passes defended, with 203. In 2019, he was elected to the Pro Football Hall of Fame in his first year of eligibility. Bailey is widely considered to be one of the greatest cornerbacks in NFL history.

== Early life ==
Roland Bailey was born in Fort Campbell, Kentucky to Elaine Bailey and grew up in Folkston, Georgia, where he was a three-sport athlete (football, basketball, track) at Charlton County High School. His mother, Elaine Bailey, is responsible for giving him the moniker "Champ" which he's known as. She claims she began calling him Champ as a baby and he's been called Champ since.

He has two brothers, one older and one younger. His older brother is Ronald Bailey and his younger brother is Rodney Bailey, but also goes by his nickname, Boss Bailey. Both also played football at Charlton County and the University of Georgia. Champ's first two seasons at Georgia overlapped with Ronald's last two seasons; Champ then played his final season alongside Boss. Ronald went on to sign with the NFL's Dallas Cowboys but suffered a career-ending injury. Boss played linebacker in the NFL for the Detroit Lions from 2003 to 2007, then joined Champ on the Denver Broncos in 2008.

At Charlton County High School, Bailey recorded 3,573 rushing yards, 58 rushing touchdowns, 13 100-yard rushing games, and 1,211 passing yards on 74 completions. On defense he recorded eight interceptions, while on special teams he returned 26 kickoffs for 731 yards and 22 punts for 318 yards. His total offensive yardage was 5,855 with 394 points scored. He still holds school records for season rushing yards (1,858), season rushing touchdowns (28), season scoring (180), and single-game rushing (417 yards), while also tying the record for single-game rushing touchdowns.

== College career ==
Bailey received an athletic scholarship to attend the University of Georgia, where he played for the Georgia Bulldogs football team from 1996 to 1998. He was regarded as one of college football's greatest multiple threats (offense, defense, and special teams) in his three seasons as a Bulldog. In his final year at Georgia, he registered 52 tackles (four for losses), three interceptions, seven passes deflected, 47 catches for 744 yards (15.8 avg.), five touchdowns, 84 yards rushing on 16 carries, 12 kickoff returns for 261 yards and four punt returns for 49 yards. He averaged 103.5 all-purpose yards per game and logged 957 plays (547 defense, 301 offense, and 109 special teams) on the way to earning consensus first-team All-America and first-team All-Southeastern Conference honors and claiming the Bronko Nagurski Trophy as the nation's top defensive player. Against the Virginia Cavaliers in the Peach Bowl, he caught three passes for 73 yards, including a 14-yard touchdown, rushed three times for nine yards, returned five kickoffs for 104 yards, returned a punt 12 yards, and posted two tackles and one pass defended at cornerback. In three years at Georgia, he played 33 games (24 starts) and recorded 147 total tackles, two fumble recoveries, one forced fumble, eight interceptions and 27 passes defended. He was an All-SEC first-team selection as a sophomore, starting every game at left cornerback and one game at wide receiver.

=== Track and field ===
Bailey was also a standout track and field athlete at Georgia; he ran the 55 meters and 60 meters, recording personal bests of 6.35 seconds and 6.85 seconds, respectively. He also competed in long jump and triple jump.

Bailey set a school indoor long jump record in 1998 of 7.89 meters (25 ft 11 in) to finish third at the SEC Indoor Track and Field Championships.

== Professional career ==
Pre-draft measurables
Height	Weight	Arm length	Hand span	40-yard dash	10-yard split	20-yard split	20-yard shuttle	Vertical jump	Broad jump
5 ft 11 3/4 in (1.82 m)	184 lb (83 kg)	31 3/8 in (0.80 m)	9 in (0.23 m)	4.28 s	1.48 s	2.49 s	3.79 s	37.0 in (0.94 m)	10 ft 1 in (3.07 m)
All values from NFL Combine and Georgia Pro Day

=== Washington Redskins ===
==== 1999 ====
The Washington Redskins selected Bailey in the first round (seventh overall) of the 1999 NFL draft. The Redskins traded their first- (12th overall), third- (71st overall), fourth- (106th overall), and fifth-round picks in the 1999 NFL Draft and their third-round pick (87th overall) in the 2000 NFL draft to the Chicago Bears in exchange for their first-round pick (seventh overall) to use to secure their draft pick to immediately select Bailey. He was the first ever drafted player to come from his hometown of Folkston, Georgia.

On July 24, 1999, the Redskins signed Bailey to a five–year, $9.64 million rookie contract that included a signing bonus of $5.25 million. The contract had a maximum value of $12 million with incentives and bonuses included.

He entered training camp slated as the No. 2 starting cornerback under defensive coordinator Mike Nolan following the departure of Cris Dishman. Head coach Norv Turner named Bailey and Darrell Green the starting cornerbacks to begin the season.

On September 12, 1999, Bailey made his professional regular season debut and earned his first career start in the Washington Redskins' home-opener against the Dallas Cowboys and made six solo tackles, one pass deflection, and had his first career interception on a pass Troy Aikman threw to wide receiver Rocket Ismail as they lost in overtime 41–35. In Week 4, he set a season-high with eight solo tackles and had one pass break-up as the Redskins defeated the Carolina Panthers 36–38. On October 17, 1999, Bailey recorded six combined tackles (three solo), set a season-high with four pass deflections, set a career-high with three interceptions off passes thrown by Jake Plummer, and returned one 59–yards to score his first career touchdown during a 24–10 victory at the Arizona Cardinals. In Week 14, he recorded six solo tackles, made two pass deflections, and intercepted a pass by Jake Plummer as the Redskins defeated the Arizona Cardinals 3–28. He started all 16 games during his rookie season and finished with 80 combined tackles (73 solo), 15 pass deflections, five interceptions, one sack, and had one touchdown.

The Washington Redskins finished the 1999 NFL season with a 10–6 record to place first in the NFC East. On January 8, 2000, Bailey started in his first career playoff appearance and recorded three solo tackles, made two pass deflections, and intercepted a pass attempt by Gus Frerotte as the Redskins defeated the Detroit Lions 13–27 in the NFC Wild-Card Game.

==== 2000 ====
On June 7, 2000, the Washington Redskins signed Deion Sanders and immediately named him the de facto No. 1 starting cornerback. The Redskins hired Ray Rhodes to be their new defensive coordinator after they chose not to re-sign Mike Nolan. Head coach Norv Turner named Bailey and Deion Sanders the starting cornerbacks to begin the season alongside Darrell Green.

On September 3, 2000, Bailey started in the Redskins' home-opener against the Carolina Panthers and set a season-high with eight solo tackles and had one pass deflection as they won 17–20. The following week, he had one solo tackle, two pass deflections, and set a season-high with two interceptions on passes thrown by Charlie Batch during a 10–15 loss at the Detroit Lions in Week 2. On November 20, 2000, he recorded one solo tackle, had one pass break-up, and helped secure a 33–20 win at the St. Louis Rams by intercepting a pass by Trent Green to wide receiver Isaac Bruce with 5:49 remaining in the fourth quarter. On December 4, 2000, the Redskins fired head coach Norv Turner as they had a 7–6 record and appointed assistant head coach Terry Robiskie to interim head coach. On December 24, 2000, Bailey recorded six solo tackles, set a season-high with four pass deflections, and intercepted a pass Jake Plummer threw to wide receiver David Boston as the Redskins defeated the Arizona Cardinals 3–20. He started in all 16 games for the second consecutive season and made 61 combined tackles (56 solo), 14 pass deflections, and five interceptions. He was selected to the 2001 Pro Bowl, marking his first Pro Bowl selection of his career.

==== 2001 ====
On January 4, 2001, the Washington Redskins hired former Kansas City Chiefs' head coach Marty Schottenheimer as their vice president of football operations and head coach. The Redskins selected cornerback Fred Smoot in the second round (45th overall) of the 2001 NFL draft. On July 28, 2001, Deion Sanders announced his retirement two days before reporting to training camp. Defensive coordinator Kurt Schottenheimer retained Bailey as the No. 1 starting cornerback to begin the season and paired him with rookie Fred Smoot.

On September 9, 2001, Bailey started in the Redskins' season-opener at the San Diego Chargers on Sunday Night Football and made four solo tackles, a pass deflection, one fumble recovery, and intercepted a pass by Doug Flutie to wide receiver Tim Dwight during a 3–30 loss. In Week 15, he set a season-high with six solo tackles and had one pass break-up during a 15–20 loss to the Chicago Bears. The following week, he had four solo tackles, tied his season-high of three pass deflections, and intercepted a pass Aaron Brooks threw to wide receiver Willie Jackson during a 40–10 win at the New Orleans Saints in Week 16. He started all 16 games throughout the 2001 NFL season and finished with 51 combined tackles (49 solo), 18 pass deflections, three interceptions, one forced fumble, and a fumble recovery. He was selected to the 2002 Pro Bowl, marking his second of 12 Pro Bowl selections throughout his career.

==== 2002 ====
On January 13, 2002, the Redskins' owner, Daniel Snyder, fired head coach Marty Schottenheimer after one season with an 8–8 record. The following day, the Washington Redskins hired Florida Gators' head coach Steve Spurrier as the new head coach. This would be Bailey's third head coach as well as his fourth defensive coordinator in as many seasons. On February 11, 2002, the Redskins unexpectedly hired Baltimore Ravens' defensive coordinator Marvin Lewis to be their new assistant head coach/defensive coordinator. Lewis reportedly agreed to return to the Ravens after leading a historic defense to Super Bowl XXXV in 2000.

On September 8, 2002, Bailey started in the season-opener at the Arizona Cardinals and made five combined tackles (four solo), two pass deflections, and intercepted a pass by Jake Plummer to wide receiver Frank Sanders during a 31–23 victory. In Week 5, he made six combined tackles (five solo), two pass deflections, and helped secure a 31–14 victory at the Tennessee Titans by intercepting a pass by Steve McNair to wide receiver Drew Bennett midway through the fourth quarter. On November 17, 2002, Bailey set a season-high with seven solo tackles and set a career-high with six pass deflections during a 17–19 loss at the New York Giants. He started all 16 games for the third consecutive season and made 68 combined tackles (62 solo) and three interceptions. He set a career-high with 24 pass deflections.

==== 2003 ====
On January 14, 2003, Washington Redskins' defensive coordinator Marvin Lewis became the new head coach of the Cincinnati Bengals. George Edwards would be promoted, becoming Bailey's fifth defensive coordinator in-a-row. Head coach Steve Spurrier retained Bailey and Fred Smoot as the starting cornerbacks to begin the season following the retirement of Darrell Green. In Week 4, he made seven combined tackles (six solo), had one pass break-up, and intercepted a pass Tom Brady threw to wide receiver David Givens as the Redskins defeated the New England Patriots 17–20. In Week 11, he set a season-high with nine combined tackles (seven solo) and made one pass deflection during a 20–17 loss at the Carolina Panthers. He started all 16 games and made 72 combined tackles (68 solo), nine pass deflections, had two interceptions, two fumble recoveries, and had one forced fumble. He was named to the 2004 Pro Bowl, marking his fourth consecutive selection.

At the conclusion of the 2003 NFL season, Bailey was on the cusp of entering free agency for the first time if the Redskins did not use their franchise tag on him. With this possibility, Bailey threatened to boycott training camp if they were to exercise their franchise tag on him. On February 16, 2004, the Washington Redskins officially exercised their franchise tag on Bailey, ceasing any plans to partake in free agency.

Unexpectedly, Redskins' owner Dan Snyder agreed to allow Bailey and his agent seek a trade. Multiple teams immediately expressed interest in acquiring Bailey, reportedly four to six teams. On February 25, 2004, it was reported that the Denver Broncos had probably edged out the New York Jets with a more appealing trade and would likely be the team to acquire Bailey.

=== Denver Broncos ===
==== 2004 ====
On March 4, 2004, the Washington Redskins traded Champ Bailey and a second-round pick (41st overall) in the 2004 NFL draft to the Denver Broncos in exchange for running back Clinton Portis. Days prior, the Broncos had reached an agreement on a contract extension with Bailey. Immediately following the trade, the Denver Broncos officially signed Bailey to a seven–year, $63 million contract extension that included $23 million guaranteed and an initial signing bonus of $18 million, becoming the largest contract for a cornerback in league history.

He entered training camp slated as the de facto No. 1 starting cornerback following the departure of Deltha O'Neal. He joined a secondary that included Lenny Walls, Kenoy Kennedy and John Lynch under defensive coordinator Larry Coyer. No. 2 starting cornerback Larry Walls was expected to return as the starter, but an ankle injury sidelined him for the entirety of training camp.

Head coach Mike Shanahan named Bailey and Kelly Herndon the starting cornerbacks to begin the season. On September 12, 2004, Bailey made his debut in the Denver Broncos' home-opener against the Kansas City Chiefs and made six combined tackles (two solo), a pass deflection, and intercepted a pass by Trent Green during a 24–34 win on ESPN Sunday Night Football. On November 21, 2004, Bailey set a career-high with 13 combined tackles (11 solo), made two pass deflections, and intercepted a pass by Aaron Brooks to wide receiver Joe Horn during a 34–13 victory at the New Orleans Saints. He started all 16 games for the sixth consecutive season and recorded 81 combined tackles (68 solo), made 12 pass deflections, and three interceptions.

The Denver Broncos finished the 2004 NFL season with a 10–6 record for second place in the AFC West. On January 9, 2005, Bailey started in the AFC Wild-Card Game at the Indianapolis Colts and recorded eight solo tackles and made one pass deflection as they lost 24–49.

==== 2005 ====
The Denver Broncos used their three highest draft picks in 2005 to draft cornerbacks. They selected Darrent Williams in the second-round (56th overall) and both Karl Paymah (76th overall) and Dominique Foxworth (97th overall) in the third-round of the 2005 NFL draft. The three new rookies and veteran Lenny Walls competed amongst themselves to determine a replacement. Head coach Mike Shanahan named Bailey and rookie Darrent Williams the starting cornerbacks to begin the season.

On September 18, 2005, Bailey recorded three solo tackles, made one pass deflection, and intercepted a pass by Drew Brees to wide receiver Keenan McCardell and returned it for a 25–yard touchdown as the Broncos defeated the San Diego Chargers 17–20. In Week 3, Bailey made three combined tackles (two solo) and had two pass break-ups before he exited in the second quarter of a 10–30 win against the Kansas City Chiefs after his leg buckled from under him when he tried to get up following a tackle on fullback Tony Richardson. He received an MRI and was confirmed to not have suffered any tears, but had sustained an injury to his hamstring that would sideline him for the next two games (Weeks 4–5). This would become the first games he would miss in his career and end a streak of 99 consecutive starts, one shy of 100. On October 23, 2005, Bailey recorded four combined tackles (three solo), set a season-high with four pass deflections, and intercepted a pass Eli Manning threw to wide receiver Plaxico Burress during a 23–24 loss at the New York Giants. On November 13, 2005, Bailey set a season-high with 10 combined tackles (eight solo), had two pass deflections, and one interception on a pass from Kerry Collins to wide receiver Jerry Porter during a 31–17 victory at the Oakland Raiders. On November 24, 2005, Bailey recorded six solo tackles, made three pass deflections, and intercepted a pass Drew Bledsoe threw to tight end Dan Campbell and returned it 65–yards for a touchdown during a 24–21 overtime victory at the Dallas Cowboys. The following week, he had one solo tackle, one pass deflection, and intercepted a pass by Trent Green thrown to Tony Gonzalez during a 31–27 victory at the Kansas City Chiefs in Week 13. On December 11, 2005, Bailey made eight combined tackles (seven solo), two pass deflections, and had his third consecutive game with an interception after picking off a pass by Kyle Boller to tight end Todd Heap as the Broncos defeated the Baltimore Ravens 12–10. He finished the season with 66 combined tackles (60 solo) and 23 pass deflections in 13 games and 13 starts. He set a new career-high with eight interceptions that he would immediately break the next season and also set a new career-high with two pick-sixes in a single season that would stand for the rest of his career.

The Denver Broncos finished the 2005 NFL season first in the AFC West with a 13–3 record, earning a first-round bye. On January 14, 2006, Bailey started in the Divisional Round against the New England Patriots and recorded two solo tackles, one pass deflection, and intercepted a pass by Tom Brady to wide receiver Troy Brown in the endzone while the Broncos were leading 10–6 at the time. He returned the interception 100–yards down the left sidelined and as he approached the opposite endzone tight end Benjamin Watson delivered an unexpected hit that instantly knocked the ball from Bailey's possession and sent it flying out-of-play at the one–yard line. His return broke the record for the longest non-scoring play in NFL history at the time and had been routinely added to highlight reels on the NFL Network, including being ranked 85th in the NFL 100 Greatest Plays. The blow delivered by Ben Watson sent the ball flying out of Bailey's hands so rapidly that it was difficult to determine if the ball exited the field-of-play at the one–yard line or if it had crossed through the endzone to result in a touchback. The result of the call would most likely have affected the outcome of game. If it was determined that the ball had exited through the endzone, the Patriots would've received possession at their 20–yard line down 10–3. The referee determined the ball exited the field-of-play at the sideline, which resulted in the Broncos receiving possession at the one–yard line, which led to a one–yard rushing touchdown by running back Mike Anderson to increase their lead by 14 points to 17–3. The Broncos capitalized on this outcome to defeat the Patriots 27–13 to advance to the AFC Championship Game.

==== 2006 ====
He returned to training camp slated as the de facto No. 1 starting cornerback. Head coach Mike Shanahan named Bailey and Darrent Williams the starting cornerback duo to begin the season. On September 10, 2006, Bailey started in the Denver Broncos' season-opener at the St. Louis Rams and set a season-high with nine solo tackles as they lost 10–18. In Week 5, he recorded five combined tackles (three solo), two pass deflections, and had his first interception of the season on a pass Steve McNair threw to wide receiver Clarence Moore as the Broncos defeated the Baltimore Ravens 13–3. On October 22, 2006, he had two solo tackles, two pass deflections, and had his third consecutive game with an interception after picking off a pass Charlie Frye threw to wide receiver Braylon Edwards during a 17–7 victory at the Cleveland Browns. On November 5, 2006, Bailey recorded seven solo tackles, set a season-high with four pass deflections, and had two interceptions thrown by Ben Roethlisberger during a 31–20 win at the Pittsburgh Steelers. On December 17, 2006, Bailey made four combined tackles (three solo), two pass deflections, and tied his season-high of two interceptions after picking off two passes Matt Leinart threw to wide receiver Anquan Boldin during a 37–20 win at the Arizona Cardinals. The following week, he recorded six solo tackles, had one pass break-up, a fumble recovery, and intercepted a pass Carson Palmer threw to wide receiver Chad Johnson during a 24–23 victory against the Cincinnati Bengals in Week 16. In Week 17, Bailey made five solo tackles, a pass break-up, and intercepted a pass by Alex Smith to running back Frank Gore and returned it 70–yards for a touchdown during a 26–23 overtime loss to the San Francisco 49ers. His pick-six would mark the last touchdown of his career and also set a new career-high with his 10th interception of the season, which also tied New England Patriots' cornerback Asante Samuel for the most interceptions in the 2006 NFL season.

Bailey, San Diego Chargers running back LaDainian Tomlinson and Miami Dolphins defensive end Jason Taylor were unanimous choices for the NFL All-Pro team. Following the season's conclusion, Bailey finished second in voting for NFL Defensive Player of the Year.

==== 2007 ====
On January 1, 2007, No. 2 starting cornerback Darrent Williams was shot and murdered in a drive-by shooting while he was sitting inside a Hummer limousine. It was later discovered the gang members responsible intended to target wide receiver Brandon Marshall.

On January 8, 2007, the Denver Broncos released defensive coordinator Larry Coyer following a so-called "mid-season meltdown" where the Broncos began with a 7–2 record and finished the season with a 9–7 record in 2006. The Broncos hired Jim Bates to be the assistant head coach, but was responsible for running the defense with newly promoted defensive backs coach Bob Slowik listed as the defensive coordinator. On March 1, 2007, the Broncos acquired ×2 Pro Bowl cornerback Dre Bly in a trade with the Detroit Lions as a response to losing Darrent Williams.

In Week 2, Bailey made four solo tackles, one pass deflection, and intercepted a pass Josh McCown threw to wide receiver Jerry Porter during a 23–20 overtime victory at the Oakland Raiders. In Week 4, he set a season-high with nine solo tackles during a 20–38 loss at the Indianapolis Colts. He was inactive for a 31–28 win against the Pittsburgh Steelers in Week 7 due to a thigh injury he sustained in their previous game against the San Diego Chargers in Week 5. He finished the 2007 NFL season with 84 combined tackles (71 solo), 14 pass deflections, and three interceptions in 15 games and 15 starts.

==== 2008 ====
On January 8, 2008, the Denver Broncos fired assistant head coach/defensive coordinator Jim Bates after a 7–9 record in 2007. Bobby Slowik was given full responsibility over the defense as defensive coordinator. He returned as the No. 1 starting cornerback to begin the season alongside Dre Bly. On September 14, 2008, Bailey made seven solo tackles, one pass deflection, and had his lone interception of the season on a pass by Philip Rivers to wide receiver Chris Chambers during a 38–39 victory against the San Diego Chargers. In Week 7, Bailey recorded two solo tackles and had one pass deflection before he exited the field in the second quarter of a 7–41 loss at the New England Patriots due to a groin injury. He remained inactive for the next seven games (Weeks 9–15) due to a torn groin muscle. On December 21, 2008, he set a season-high with nine solo tackles and had a strip/sack for an eight–yard loss on Trent Edwards during a 30–23 loss against the Buffalo Bills. He finished with 44 combined tackles (39 solo), three pass deflections, one sack, and one interception in nine games and nine starts. On December 30, 2008, the Broncos fired head coach Mike Shanahan after they finished with an 8–8 record.

==== 2009 ====
On January 11, 2009, the Denver Broncos hired Josh McDaniels as their new head coach. Mike Nolan was hired to be defensive coordinator, reuniting him with Bailey as his defensive coordinator from his rookie year with the Washington Redskins.

The Broncos selected cornerback Alphonso Smith in the second round (37th overall) of the 2009 NFL draft, trading their first-round pick (14th overall) in 2010 NFL draft to the Seattle Seahawks in order to acquire the draft pick to select him. Alphonso Smith and André Goodman competed for the role as the No. 2 starting cornerback to replace Dre Bly. Head coach Josh McDaniels named Bailey and André Goodman the starting cornerbacks to begin the season.

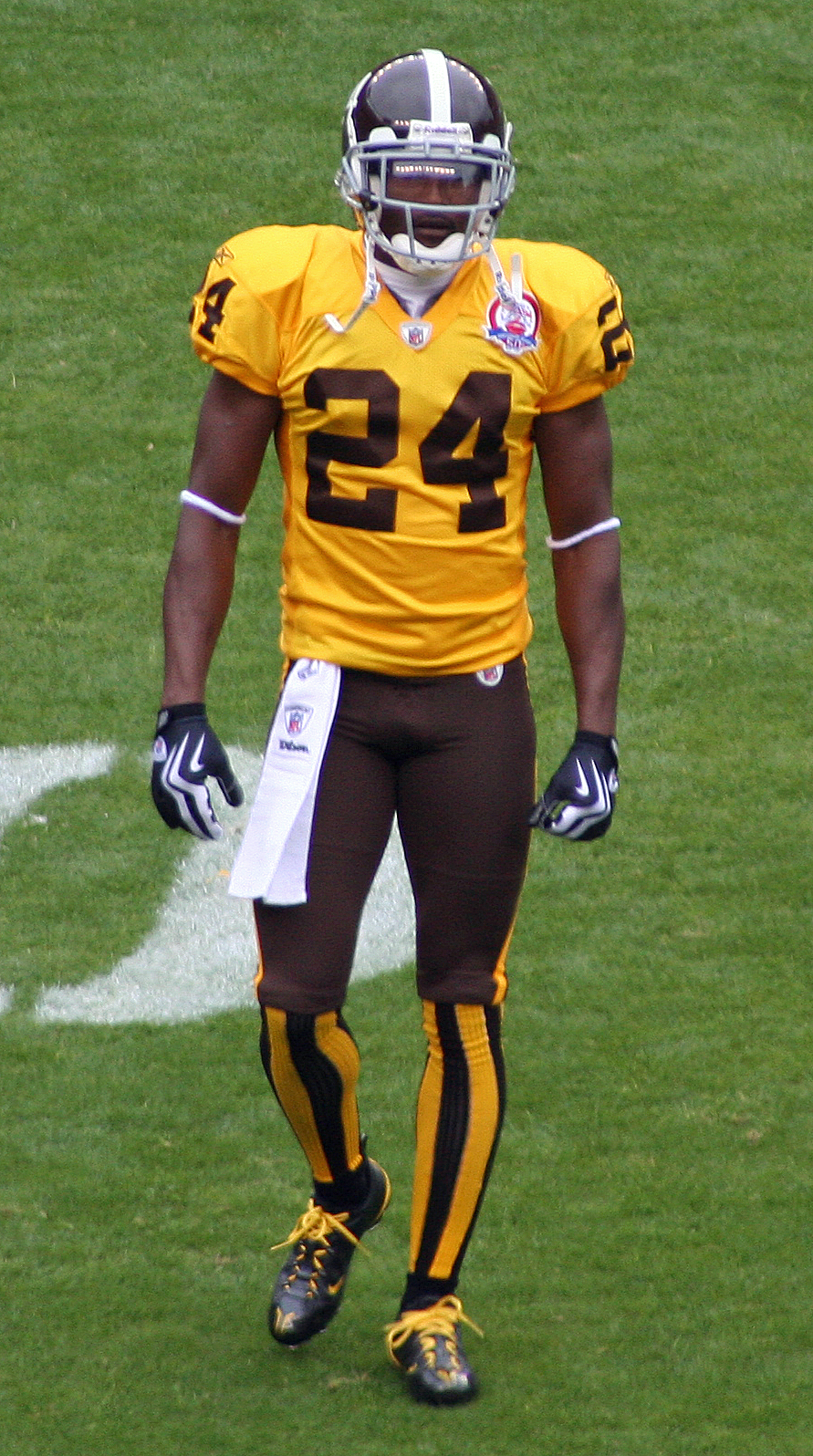
Bailey wearing a Denver Broncos throwback uniform in 2009

On September 15, 2009, Bailey was chosen for the Broncos 50th Anniversary team by the Denver community. On October 4, 2009, Bailey recorded eight solo tackles, set a season-high with four pass deflections, and intercepted a pass Tony Romo threw to wide receiver Miles Austin during a 17–10 victory against the Dallas Cowboys. In Week 9, he set a season-high with 12 combined tackles (10 solo) during a 10–28 loss against the Pittsburgh Steelers. He started all 16 games throughout the 2009 NFL season and recorded 74 combined tackles (63 solo), 15 pass deflections, three interceptions, and one sack. In 2009, Bailey did not allow a touchdown in 80 passes thrown his way that year and played on 98% of the snaps.

==== 2010 ====
In 2010, Bailey matched up against some of the NFL's best wideouts. He held Dwayne Bowe to no catches on 2 targets. The Arizona Cardinals only completed 3 passes on him for 19 yards in a game where he matched up with Larry Fitzgerald. Bailey was selected to play in his record-breaking 10th Pro Bowl. No cornerback in NFL history has been to more. He was ranked 48th by his fellow players on the NFL Top 100 Players of 2011.

==== 2011 ====
It was announced on February 22, 2011, by the Broncos vice president of football operations, John Elway, that Bailey was re-signed to a 4-year contract.

During the 2012 offseason, Bailey was named the 46th-best player in the NFL by the league's network, NFL Network.

==== 2012 ====
In 2012, Bailey was named an All-Pro for the 8th time of his career and was selected to the 2013 Pro Bowl. The Pro Bowl selection was his 12th, extending the record he set for trips by a cornerback, and tied the record for most Pro Bowls played, along with Randall McDaniel and Will Shields. On December 6, 2012, Bailey recorded the 52nd and final interception of his career, picking off Carson Palmer in a 26–13 victory on Thursday Night Football over the Oakland Raiders.

During the 2012 AFC Divisional Round against the Baltimore Ravens, Bailey was beaten woefully multiple times on deep routes by Ravens wide receiver Torrey Smith, who totaled 98 yards for two touchdowns on three catches as Baltimore would go on to win in dramatic fashion 38–35 in double overtime, en route to eventually winning Super Bowl XLVII. Bailey's struggles against Smith led to the initial speculation on the effectiveness of the aging 34-year-old cornerback.

During the 2013 offseason, Bailey was named the 53rd-best player in the NFL by his peers on the league's network, NFL Network.

==== 2013 ====
During the course of the 2013 season, while not making his season debut until week 7 at the Indianapolis Colts, Bailey was limited to a career-low 5 games with a foot injury; however, Bailey returned in time for the playoffs and held his own when fellow cornerback, Chris Harris, was ruled out for the remainder of the season after a torn ACL Bailey played in his first Super Bowl at Super Bowl XLVIII in which he had 4 tackles in a 43–8 loss to the Seattle Seahawks. (which would turn out to be the final game Bailey played).

On March 6, 2014, the Denver Broncos released Bailey.

=== New Orleans Saints ===
On April 4, 2014, Champ Bailey signed a two-year, $7 million contract with the New Orleans Saints. Bailey failed to make the final roster and was released by the team on August 30, 2014.

Bailey announced his retirement from professional football on October 18, 2014. On November 14, 2014, it was announced that Bailey would sign a one-day contract with Denver to allow him to officially retire as a Bronco.

On February 2, 2019, Bailey was elected to the Pro Football Hall of Fame in his first year of eligibility. He was enshrined on August 3, 2019, during a ceremony in Tom Benson Hall of Fame Stadium.

== NFL career statistics ==
Legend
	NFL record
	Led the league
**Bold**	Career high
Underline	Incomplete data

=== Regular season ===
Year	Team	Games		Tackles						Interceptions						Fumbles				
Year	Team	GP	GS	Cmb	Solo	Ast	TFL	QBH	Sck	PD	Int	Yds	Y/I	Lng	TD	FF	FR	Yds	Y/F	TD
1999	WAS	16	16	80	73	7	2	—	**1.0**	16	5	55	11.0	59	1	0	0	0	—	0
2000	WAS	16	16	61	56	5	0	—	0.0	14	5	48	9.6	48	0	0	1	0	0.0	0
2001	WAS	16	16	51	49	2	1	—	0.0	18	3	17	5.7	12	0	1	1	0	0.0	0
2002	WAS	16	16	68	62	6	2	—	0.0	**24**	3	2	0.7	2	0	0	1	0	0.0	0
2003	WAS	16	16	72	68	4	5	—	0.0	9	2	2	1.0	2	0	1	**2**	1	0.5	0
2004	DEN	16	16	81	68	**13**	**6**	—	0.0	12	3	0	0.0	0	0	0	0	0	—	0
2005	DEN	14	14	66	60	6	3	—	0.0	23	8	139	**17.4**	65	**2**	1	0	0	—	0
2006	DEN	16	16	**86**	**74**	12	5	0	0.0	21	**10**	**162**	16.2	**70**	1	0	1	**4**	**4.0**	0
2007	DEN	15	15	84	71	**13**	5	1	0.0	14	3	3	1.0	3	0	0	0	0	—	0
2008	DEN	9	9	44	39	5	3	**2**	**1.0**	3	1	0	0.0	0	0	**2**	0	0	—	0
2009	DEN	16	16	74	63	11	3	0	0.0	15	3	18	6.0	11	0	1	0	0	—	0
2010	DEN	15	15	45	41	4	3	1	**1.0**	13	2	0	0.0	0	0	0	0	0	—	0
2011	DEN	13	13	39	35	4	1	0	0.0	10	2	0	0.0	0	0	1	0	0	—	0
2012	DEN	16	15	66	61	5	3	0	0.0	8	2	18	9.0	18	0	0	0	0	—	0
2013	DEN	5	3	14	12	2	0	0	0.0	3	0	0	—	0	0	0	0	0	—	0
Career		215	212	931	832	99	42	4	3.0	203	52	464	8.9	70	4	7	6	5	0.8	0

=== Postseason ===
Year	Team	Games		Tackles						Interceptions					
Year	Team	GP	GS	Cmb	Solo	Ast	TFL	QBH	Sck	PD	Int	Yds	Y/I	Lng	TD
1999	WAS	2	2	4	4	0	0	—	0.0	2	**1**	5	5.0	5	0
2004	DEN	1	1	8	8	0	0	—	0.0	1	0	0	—	0	0
2005	DEN	2	2	5	3	**2**	0	—	0.0	2	**1**	**100**	**100.0**	**100**	0
2011	DEN	2	2	5	3	**2**	0	0	0.0	**3**	0	0	—	0	0
2012	DEN	1	1	2	2	0	0	0	0.0	1	0	0	—	0	0
2013	DEN	3	2	**11**	**11**	0	0	0	0.0	0	0	0	—	0	0
Career		11	10	35	31	4	0	0	0.0	9	2	105	52.5	100	0

== Career highlights ==
=== Awards and honors ===
NFL

- 3× First-team All-Pro (2004–2006)
- 4× Second-team All-Pro (2000, 2003, 2007, 2012)
- 12× Pro Bowl (2000–2007, 2009–2012)
- NFL interceptions leader (2006)
- NFL 2000s All-Decade Team
- PFWA All-Rookie Team (1999)
- Washington Commanders 90 Greatest
- Denver Broncos 50th Anniversary Team
- Denver Broncos Ring of Fame
- 3× NFL Top 100 — 48th (2011), 46th (2012), 53rd (2013)

College

- Bronko Nagurski Trophy (1998)
- Consensus All-American (1998)
- 2× First-team All-SEC (1997, 1998)
- Second-team AP All-Time All-American (2025)

=== Records ===
==== NFL records ====
- Most Pro Bowl selections for a defensive back (12)
- Most passes defended (203)
- Longest interception return in a postseason game without scoring (100 yds) (vs New England Patriots, 1/14/06)
- Youngest player to intercept 3 passes in a game (21) (at Arizona Cardinals, 10/17/99)

==== Pro Bowl records ====
- Most career interceptions in Pro Bowl (4)

== Personal life ==
Bailey married his wife, Jessica, at the Pelican Hill resort in Newport Beach, California in 2014.
