= Nick Ferguson =

American gridiron football player (born 1974)

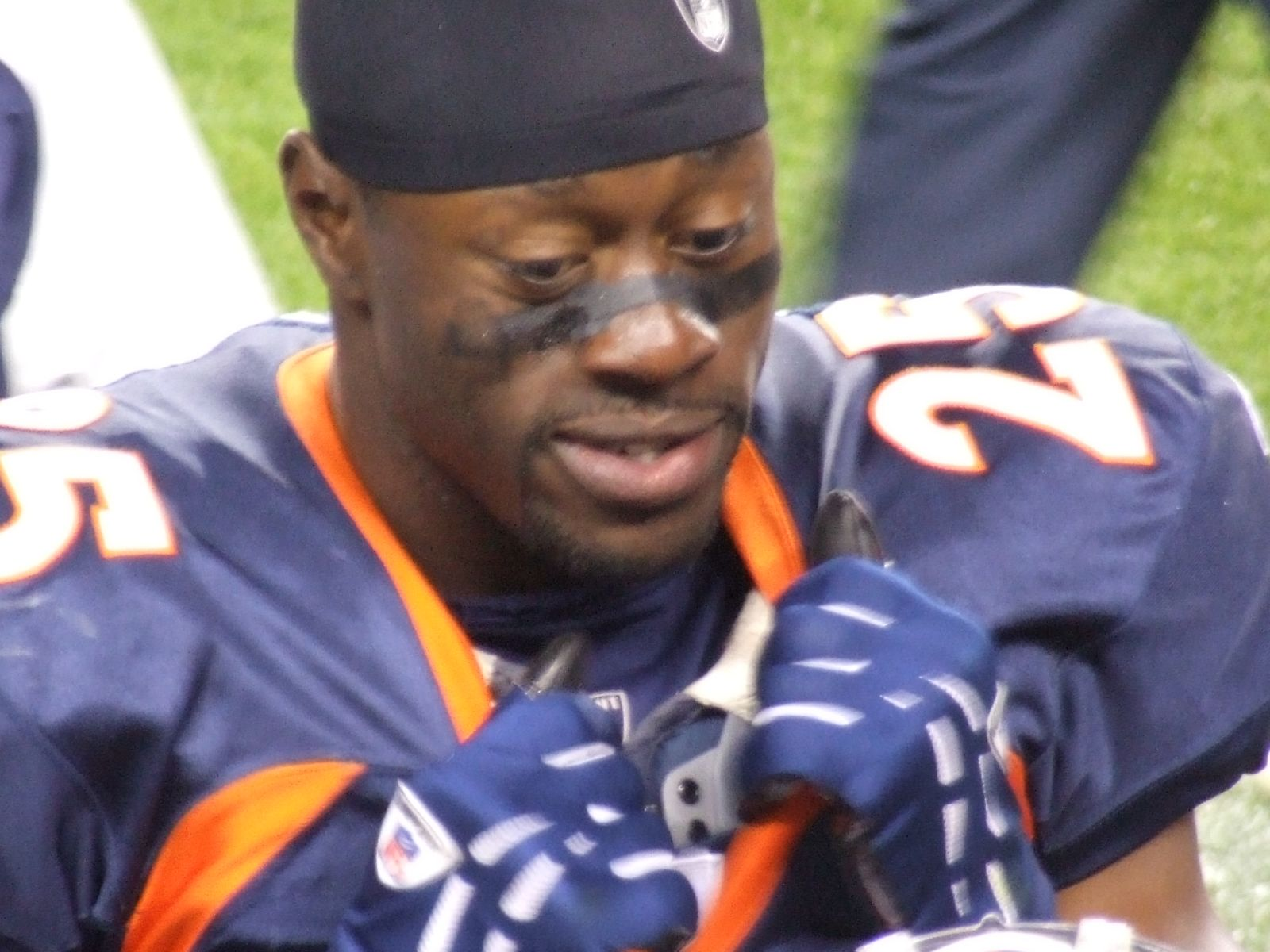
- Ferguson with the Denver Broncos in 2006

No. 6, 33, 25
- Position: Safety

Personal information
- Born: November 27, 1974 (age 51); Miami, Florida, U.S.
- Listed height: 5 ft 11 in (1.80 m)
- Listed weight: 201 lb (91 kg)

Career information
- High school: Miami Jackson Senior
- College: Morris Brown; Georgia Tech
- NFL draft: 1996: undrafted

Career history
- Cincinnati Bengals (1996)*; Saskatchewan Roughriders (1996); Winnipeg Blue Bombers (1997–1998); Rhein Fire (1999); Chicago Bears (1999)*; Winnipeg Blue Bombers (1999); Rhein Fire (2000); Buffalo Bills (2000)*; New York Jets (2000–2002); Denver Broncos (2003–2007); Houston Texans (2008–2009)
- * Offseason or practice squad member only

Career NFL statistics
- Total tackles: 420
- Sacks: 1
- Forced fumbles: 6
- Fumble recoveries: 6
- Interceptions: 7
- Stats at Pro Football Reference

Nicholas A. Ferguson (born November 27, 1974) is an American former professional football player who was a safety in the National Football League (NFL). He spent the majority of his career with the Denver Broncos.

He was originally signed by the Cincinnati Bengals as an undrafted free agent in 1996. He played college football for the Georgia Tech Yellow Jackets. Ferguson was also a member of the Saskatchewan Roughriders, Winnipeg Blue Bombers, Rhein Fire, Chicago Bears, Buffalo Bills, New York Jets, Denver Broncos, and Houston Texans.

== Professional career ==
=== Denver Broncos ===
Playing with the Denver Broncos, Ferguson started 44 games at safety, grabbing six interceptions along the way. His most notable play came in the 2006 AFC Divisional Playoffs when he came on a safety blitz and pressured Tom Brady into throwing a 100-yard interception by Champ Bailey.

=== Houston Texans ===
On March 27, 2008, he signed a one-year contract with the Houston Texans. On March 12, 2009, he re-signed a new one-year contract with the Texans.

== NFL career statistics ==
Legend
	Led the league
**Bold**	Career high

=== Regular season ===
Year	Team	Games		Tackles				Interceptions				Fumbles			
Year	Team	GP	GS	Comb	Solo	Ast	Sck	Int	Yds	TD	Lng	FF	FR	Yds	TD
2000	NYJ	7	0	12	8	4	0.0	1	20	0	20	0	0	0	0
2001	NYJ	16	1	30	25	5	0.0	0	0	0	0	1	1	0	0
2002	NYJ	16	0	28	21	7	0.0	0	0	0	0	0	1	0	0
2003	DEN	15	10	76	**63**	13	**1.0**	0	0	0	0	**2**	0	0	0
2004	DEN	16	1	34	23	11	0.0	0	0	0	0	0	0	0	0
2005	DEN	16	16	**80**	62	**18**	0.0	**5**	**59**	0	**30**	0	1	0	0
2006	DEN	10	10	36	28	8	0.0	1	0	0	0	1	0	0	0
2007	DEN	12	7	55	43	12	0.0	0	0	0	0	1	**2**	0	0
2008	HOU	14	9	59	48	11	0.0	0	0	0	0	1	1	0	0
2009	HOU	10	1	10	8	2	0.0	0	0	0	0	0	0	0	0
		132	55	420	329	91	1.0	7	79	0	30	6	6	0	0

=== Playoffs ===
Year	Team	Games		Tackles				Interceptions				Fumbles			
Year	Team	GP	GS	Comb	Solo	Ast	Sck	Int	Yds	TD	Lng	FF	FR	Yds	TD
2001	NYJ	1	0	0	0	0	0.0	0	0	0	0	0	0	0	0
2002	NYJ	2	0	1	1	0	0.0	0	0	0	0	0	0	0	0
2004	DEN	1	0	3	0	3	0.0	0	0	0	0	0	0	0	0
2005	DEN	2	2	**14**	**9**	**5**	0.0	0	0	0	0	**1**	0	0	0
		6	2	18	10	8	0.0	0	0	0	0	1	0	0	0

== Post-retirement ==
Ferguson served as an assistant coach with the San Francisco 49ers in 2018, following coaching internships with the 49ers, Broncos, Seattle Seahawks and Texans. He has spent time as a sports-talk radio host with the NFL on TuneIn, NBC Sports Radio, WQXI, KFWBKKFN and Voice of America, and has written for The Players' Tribune.

Ferguson is a Scientologist.
