= Damien Nash =

American football player (1982–2007)

- Nash playing for Missouri

No. 42, 29
- Position: Running back

Personal information
- Born: April 14, 1982; St. Louis, Missouri, U.S.
- Died: February 24, 2007 (aged 24); St. Louis, Missouri, U.S.
- Listed height: 5 ft 10 in (1.78 m)
- Listed weight: 220 lb (100 kg)

Career information
- High school: East St. Louis (Illinois)
- College: Missouri
- NFL draft: 2005: 5th round, 142nd overall pick

Career history
- Tennessee Titans (2005); Denver Broncos (2006)

Career NFL statistics
- Rushing attempts: 24
- Rushing yards: 98
- Receptions: 7
- Receiving yards: 55
- Stats at Pro Football Reference

Damien Darnell Nash (April 14, 1982 – February 24, 2007) was an American professional football running back who played for the Tennessee Titans and Denver Broncos of the National Football League (NFL). He died after the 2006 season, his only season with the Broncos.

== Early life ==
Nash attended St. Louis Riverview Gardens High School for the first three years of his education. He followed his coach, Darren Sunkett, to East Saint Louis High School for his senior year. He finished his career with 5,395 rushing yards and 85 rushing touchdowns as well as 1,160 passing yards and 10 passing touchdowns.

He was a track star in high school and ran the 100 meter dash in 10.3 seconds.

== College career ==
Damien was recruited for football by the University of Missouri, but attended Coffeyville Community College in Coffeyville, Kansas before transferring to the University of Missouri. He finished his college career with 253 rushing attempts for 1,254 yards (5.0 yards per rushing attempt average) with 12 rushing touchdowns as well as 36 receptions for 282 yards (7.8 yards per reception average) with two receiving touchdowns).

== Professional career ==
Nash was drafted with the 142nd overall pick in the fifth round of the 2005 NFL draft by the Tennessee Titans. He was released after one season with the Titans and was signed by the Denver Broncos. After spending the first portion of the season on the Broncos practice squad, he was given a roster spot as the third-string running back behind Tatum Bell and Mike Bell.

Nash appeared in six NFL games, three with the Titans and three with the Broncos. He had 24 carries for 98 yards (4.1 yards per rushing attempt average) and no touchdowns as well as seven receptions for 55 yards (7.9 yards per reception average) and no touchdowns.

His best performance came during the November 19, 2006, game against the San Diego Chargers, with ten carries for fifty-two yards and three receptions for thirty-six yards.

He did not appear in the Broncos' final five games of the 2006 season. However, Broncos coach Mike Shanahan said about Nash "We never had a guy play for one year, as Damien did, and influence so many people."

== Death ==
Nash collapsed suddenly following a celebrity charity basketball game at Riverview Gardens High School on February 23, 2007. He was found unresponsive at a residence in suburban St. Louis and was later pronounced dead. The charity event was a fundraiser to benefit the Darris Nash Find A Heart Foundation, a charity which raises funds for heart transplant research. Nash had created the charity in honor of his older brother, Darris, a recent heart transplant recipient.

Sergeant Ed Douglas of the Ferguson, Missouri, police department said in a telephone interview that Nash was transported by ambulance to Christian Hospital Northeast. Douglas said the case was still under investigation. Nash was pronounced dead at 6:41 p.m. MST. An autopsy confirmed that no drugs or unnatural substances were present in Nash's body at the time of death. While being a natural death of cardiac origin, the exact cause of death remains undetermined.

He is survived by his wife, Judy Jae' Nash and daughter Phaith Nash. Nash was the second Broncos player to die in 2007; cornerback Darrent Williams was shot to death while riding in a limousine after leaving a Denver nightclub early on the morning of January 1, 2007.

== See also ==
- List of gridiron football players who died during their careers
