= Javon Walker =

American football player (born 1978)

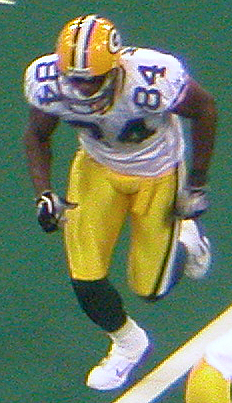
- Walker with the Green Bay Packers in 2004

No. 84
- Position: Wide receiver

Personal information
- Born: October 14, 1978 (age 48); Galveston, Texas, U.S.
- Listed height: 6 ft 3 in (1.91 m)
- Listed weight: 215 lb (98 kg)

Career information
- High school: St. Thomas More (Lafayette, Louisiana)
- College: Jones County Junior College (1998–1999); Florida State (2000–2001)
- NFL draft: 2002: 1st round, 20th overall pick

Career history
- Green Bay Packers (2002–2005); Denver Broncos (2006–2007); Oakland Raiders (2008–2009); Minnesota Vikings (2010)*
- * Offseason or practice squad member only

Awards and highlights
- Pro Bowl (2004); Second-team All-ACC (2001); Gator Bowl MVP (2002)

Career NFL statistics
- Receptions: 267
- Receiving yards: 4,011
- Receiving touchdowns: 31
- Stats at Pro Football Reference

Javon Liteff Walker (born October 14, 1978) is an American former professional football player. He was a wide receiver in the National Football League (NFL) and he was drafted by the Green Bay Packers 20th overall in the 2002 NFL draft. He played college football for the Florida State Seminoles.

Walker also played for the Denver Broncos and Oakland Raiders. He was selected to the Pro Bowl with the Packers in 2004.

== Early life ==
Walker played for St. Thomas More High School in Lafayette, Louisiana. He holds the records at his high school for most career touchdowns, most touchdowns in a game, and longest play from scrimmage. Walker was drafted by the Florida Marlins in the 12th round (366th overall) of the 1997 Major League Baseball draft, and spent three years in the minor leagues of the organization.

== College career ==
Walker attended Jones County Junior College in Ellisville, Mississippi, where he was Deion Branch's teammate, before enrolling at Florida State University. Walker was also a triple jumper, with a best jump of 15.40 meters, and had a personal-best mark of 6.91 meters in the long jump.

== Professional career ==
Pre-draft measurables
| Height | Weight | Arm length | Hand span | 40-yard dash | 10-yard split | 20-yard split | 20-yard shuttle | Three-cone drill | Vertical jump | Broad jump |
|---|---|---|---|---|---|---|---|---|---|---|
| 6 ft 2 3/4 in (1.90 m) | 210 lb (95 kg) | 32 1/2 in (0.83 m) | 9 3/4 in (0.25 m) | 4.35 s | 1.50 s | 2.51 s | 4.05 s | 6.86 s | 39.5 in (1.00 m) | 10 ft 8 in (3.25 m) |
All values from NFL Combine

=== Green Bay Packers ===
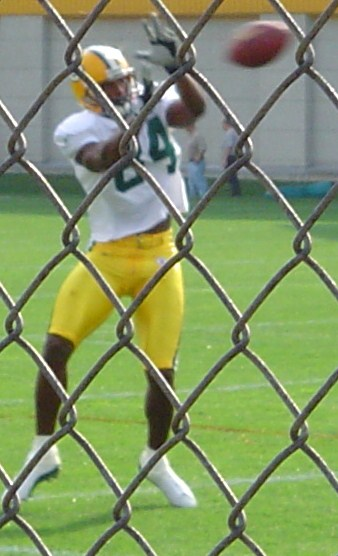
Walker at the Packers training camp in 2004

After being drafted by the Green Bay Packers, Walker became the fourth player in NFL history to have 100 receiving yards in each of his first two playoff games (2002 vs. Atlanta and 2003 vs. Seattle). He was selected to the NFC's Pro Bowl team for the first time for the 2004 season, following a breakout year.

After the 2004 season, Walker, backed by new agent Drew Rosenhaus, said that he would not play for the Green Bay Packers again and would retire if he was not traded. Walker had been at odds with the organization since management refused to renegotiate his contract that had two years remaining on it after his Pro Bowl season in 2004, when he caught 89 passes for 1,382 yards and 12 touchdowns. "I just don't like the way the organization runs itself", Walker told ESPN.com. "They want players to come up there and play hard and work hard, but when it comes time to be compensated, it's like, 'We forgot what you've done.'" Walker also said quarterback Brett Favre's comments on his plans to hold out for a better contract last year made living in Wisconsin difficult, and he felt it was unfair that the team let Favre interfere with Walker's squabble with management. "There's an unwritten rule that players stick together," Walker said. Walker said he would not show up for training camp or come back at all for the final season of his contract regardless of whether Favre decided to retire or return. He said he'll repay the Packers the prorated portion of his signing bonus to leave Green Bay. "Why should I risk another year of getting beat up playing for a team that I don't want to play for? That's stupid", Walker said. Walker said that he would be ready for the 2006 season wherever he lands. "If I'm going to go out and take hits, it's going to be for a team that I love playing for", Walker said. "I'm not going to grandstand. I just want the Packers to give me peace of mind."

Ted Thompson released a statement regarding the interview:

During his time as a Green Bay Packer, Javon Walker has been well thought of by everyone here. I like Javon, certainly as a person and as a player. That said, Javon is under contract, which he signed as a 2002 first-round draft choice. That contract is governed by the Collective Bargaining Agreement, which was negotiated between the National Football League and the National Football League Players’ Association, and we expect him to honor it. There have been several highly publicized cases of player discontent in the National Football League. I don’t anticipate us making any concessions in this matter. We will continue to stay the course, and the Green Bay Packers will have no further comment on this topic.

Walker eventually backed off of his threats to hold out and reported to camp. In the first game of the 2005 season, Walker injured his ACL on a pass from Favre. The Packers placed Walker on injured reserve for the remainder of the season.

=== Denver Broncos ===
The Packers traded Walker to the Denver Broncos for a second round pick in the 2006 NFL draft (later used by the Atlanta Falcons to select Jimmy F. Williams) on April 29, 2006. He signed a five-year deal worth more than $40 million, including roster bonuses totaling $15 million in 2007 and 2008. Walker recovered from his previous injury, and was productive during the 2006 season. He caught sixty-nine passes for 1,084 yards and eight touchdowns. Following the Broncos' season finale against the San Francisco 49ers, Walker was in a vehicle that was shot at in downtown Denver, killing teammate Darrent Williams. After Williams was shot, he fell into Walker's lap. In memory of Williams, Walker wore a hairstyle called the "fro-hawk", made famous by Williams, to begin the 2007 season. Walker said in an interview with Andrea Kremer of HBO's Real Sports that the attacks likely stemmed from a confrontation with bar patrons involving rookie wideout Brandon Marshall and his cousin.

On February 29, 2008, the Broncos released Walker after being unable to trade him.

=== Oakland Raiders ===
On March 4, 2008, the Oakland Raiders signed Walker to a six-year, $55 million contract that included $16 million in guaranteed money. In November 2008, Walker announced that he'd miss the rest of the season due to injury. For the season, Walker played in eight games, had 15 receptions for 196 yards and one touchdown. For the 2009 season, Walker played in only three games and had no statistics. He was released by the team on March 8, 2010.

For his two seasons of employment with the Raiders, Walker collected $21 million.

=== Minnesota Vikings ===
On August 23, 2010, it was reported Walker would sign with the Minnesota Vikings, who had also tried out Brandon Jones to make up the depth at wide receiver. Jones would later sign with the Seattle Seahawks. The signing was largely brought about due to Sidney Rice undergoing hip surgery and missing half of the season and health concerns about Percy Harvin, who suffered from recurring migraines. Walker was released September 5, before the regular season opener.

=== Suspension ===
On December 11, 2010, Walker was suspended by the NFL for four games. Although four-game suspensions were at that time handed out by the league for violating either the league's substance abuse policy or steroids policy, it was unclear which applied to Walker's situation.

== NFL career statistics ==
| Season | Team | GP | Receiving | | | | | | | | |
| Season | Team | GP | Rec | Tgt | Yds | Avg | Lng | TD | FD | Fum | Lost |
|---|---|---|---|---|---|---|---|---|---|---|---|
| 2002 | GB | 15 | 23 | - | 319 | 13.9 | 30 | 1 | 14 | 1 | 1 |
| 2003 | GB | 16 | 41 | - | 716 | 17.5 | 66 | 9 | 27 | 1 | 1 |
| 2004 | GB | 16 | 89 | 137 | 1,382 | 15.5 | 79 | 12 | 63 | 2 | 2 |
| 2005 | GB | 1 | 4 | - | 27 | 6.8 | 9 | 0 | 2 | 0 | 0 |
| 2006 | DEN | 16 | 69 | 125 | 1,084 | 15.7 | 83 | 8 | 53 | 0 | 0 |
| 2007 | DEN | 8 | 26 | 50 | 287 | 11.0 | 24 | 0 | 10 | 0 | 0 |
| 2008 | OAK | 8 | 15 | 32 | 196 | 13.1 | 29 | 1 | 12 | 0 | 0 |
| Career | | 83 | 267 | 207 | 4,011 | 15.0 | 83 | 31 | 181 | 4 | 4 |

== Robbery incident ==
Just after 7 A.M. on June 16, 2008, Walker was found unconscious in Las Vegas on a street just off the Las Vegas Strip. The previous evening he had been at Body English, a nightclub at the Hard Rock Hotel in Las Vegas. He left at approximately 5 A.M. the next morning. After being found unconscious, Walker was taken to a local hospital with what police described as "significant injuries," including a concussion. He was listed in fair condition and released from the hospital on June 18.

Police said Walker was the victim of an apparent robbery, as a large amount of cash and some jewelry were taken from him. Police arrested two suspects, one in late June (Arfat Fadel) and the other in early July. On July 7, 2010, Deshawn Lamont Thomas, an 11-time convicted felon, was sentenced to life imprisonment without the possibility of parole for his part in the crime.
