= Taylor Whitley =

American football player (1980–2018)

No. 69, 59
- Position: Guard

Personal information
- Born: February 21, 1980; Baytown, Texas, U.S.
- Died: August 1, 2018 (aged 38); Lake Jackson, Texas, U.S.
- Listed height: 6 ft 4 in (1.93 m)
- Listed weight: 315 lb (143 kg)

Career information
- High school: Sudan (TX)
- College: Texas A&M
- NFL draft: 2003: 3rd round, 87th overall pick

Career history
- Miami Dolphins (2003–2004); Denver Broncos (2005); Washington Redskins (2006)

Career NFL statistics
- Games played: 18
- Games started: 11
- Stats at Pro Football Reference

Taylor Ross Whitley (February 21, 1980 – August 1, 2018) was an American professional football guard in the National Football League (NFL). He was selected in the third round of the 2003 NFL draft with the 87th overall pick. He played two years with the Miami Dolphins (2003-2004), one year with the Denver Broncos (2005), and another with the Washington Redskins.
