= Tatum Bell =

American football player (born 1981)

No. 26, 28, 21, 25
- Position: Running back

Personal information
- Born: March 2, 1981 (age 45); Dallas, Texas, U.S.
- Listed height: 5 ft 11 in (1.80 m)
- Listed weight: 213 lb (97 kg)

Career information
- High school: DeSoto (DeSoto, Texas)
- College: Oklahoma State (2000–2003)
- NFL draft: 2004: 2nd round, 41st overall pick

Career history
- Denver Broncos (2004–2006); Detroit Lions (2007); Denver Broncos (2008); Florida Tuskers (2009)

Awards and highlights
- First-team All-Big 12 (2003); Second-team All-Big 12 (2002)

Career NFL statistics
- Rushing attempts: 569
- Rushing yards: 2,773
- Receptions: 71
- Receiving yards: 419
- Total touchdowns: 16
- Stats at Pro Football Reference

Tatum Antoine Bell (born March 2, 1981) is an American former professional football player who was a running back in the National Football League (NFL). He played college football for the Oklahoma State Cowboys and was selected by the Denver Broncos in the second round of the 2004 NFL draft.

Bell also played for the Detroit Lions and Florida Tuskers.

== Early life ==
Bell was born in Dallas, Texas and grew up in DeSoto, a suburb of Dallas. He is the son of Tony and Terry Bell, and has a younger brother, T.J., and an older sister, Latrice Coleman. He attended DeSoto High School. In high school, he was considered one of the fastest high school players in the nation, he was clocked running 4.34 in the 40-yard dash, and 10.26 seconds over 100 meters.

He was hampered by a hip pointer and sprained ankle as a senior, but still rushed for 1,225 yards and 19 touchdowns. He was also an effective kick and punt returner. In addition to his 19 rushing touchdowns, he had three touchdown passes and returned one kickoff for a touchdown. He was listed as a Top 100 Texas player by First Down Recruiting, PrepStar, the Dallas Morning News and David Garvin. He was a two-time all-district selection at running back.

== College career ==
Bell played for Oklahoma State University from 2000 to 2003, and was a starter for three years, rushing for a total of 4,285 yards. The schools 4th all-time leading rusher. Tatum Bell's Rushing Touchdowns places him 4th all-time in school history with 43.

In 2000, as a true freshman, Bell rushed for 251 yards on 49 carries. During the following spring, he led Oklahoma State in rushing in both major scrimmages, recording 14 carries for 110 yards and three touchdowns in the first and 15 carries for 80 yards and one touchdown in the second. He later had a long run against Oklahoma in the nationally televised season finale at Lewis Field. Bell chose Oklahoma State over Nebraska, Texas and Oklahoma. He was a three-year starter and finished his college career with 4,285 rushing yards.

In 2001, he carried the ball 237 times for 1,052 yards and eight touchdowns. He averaged 87.6 yards per game and almost four and a half yards per carry. Bell eclipsed the 100-yard rushing mark twice last season, including a career-high 117 yards against Missouri. He had 102 yards in Oklahoma State's win over Louisiana Tech on Lewis Field. The last four games of the 2001 season were particularly impressive for Bell. Against Colorado, Texas Tech, Baylor and Oklahoma, Bell carried the ball a combined 80 times for 333 yards. That's a four-game average of 83.25 yards per game and 4.16 yards per carry.

In 2002, he carried the ball 215 Times for 1,454 yards and 15 touchdowns.

In 2003; Bell's senior season he rushed for 1,528 on 253 carries including a total of 19 touchdowns.

== Professional career ==
Pre-draft measurables
Height	Weight	Arm length	Hand span	40-yard dash	10-yard split	20-yard split	Vertical jump	Broad jump	Bench press
5 ft 11 in (1.80 m)	212 lb (96 kg)	31 7/8 in (0.81 m)	8 3/8 in (0.21 m)	4.32 s	1.52 s	2.53 s	38.5 in (0.98 m)	9 ft 11 in (3.02 m)	25 reps
All values from NFL Combine

=== Denver Broncos (first stint) ===
Bell was drafted in the second round with the 41st overall pick in the 2004 NFL draft, after attending Oklahoma State University for four years and finishing 3rd on the school's all-time career rushing yards list. The Broncos originally acquired the pick along with cornerback Champ Bailey in a trade that sent Clinton Portis to the Washington Redskins.

He debuted with the Denver Broncos in 2004, and led all AFC rookie running backs in rushing yards. In 2005 he was the second part of a dual running back system with Mike Anderson and rushed for 921 yards (gaining 5.3 yards per carry) and eight touchdowns. In 2006 Bell rushed for 1,025 yards and two touchdowns.

=== Detroit Lions ===
On March 1, 2007, Bell was traded along with George Foster and a draft pick to the Detroit Lions for Dré Bly.

On October 12, 2007, it was revealed that Bell had asked the Lions to trade him earlier in the week, due to the re-emergence of Kevin Jones and his diminished role at tailback. Bell has since told the media that he did not demand a trade, but that he simply was disappointed in his diminishing role on the team.

On March 10, 2008, Bell re-signed with the Lions on a one-year contract. He stated that his goal for the 2008 NFL season was to rush for 1,300 yards and 15 touchdowns. However, he was released by the Lions on September 1 after the team signed running back Rudi Johnson.

=== Denver Broncos (second stint) ===
Bell signed with the Broncos on November 11, 2008. (He had spent the previous three months working in the T-Mobile store at Town Center at Aurora.) He was not re-signed following the season.

=== Florida Tuskers ===
Bell was signed by the Florida Tuskers of the United Football League on September 3, 2009. He wore #25. During the week of November 19 he ran for 365 yards and set a UFL record. He was released on August 24, 2010.

=== UFL records ===
- Most rushing yards in a single game: 365 (2009)

== NFL career statistics ==
Legend
**Bold**	Career high

=== Regular season ===
Year	Team	Games		Rushing					Receiving				
Year	Team	GP	GS	Att	Yds	Avg	Lng	TD	Rec	Yds	Avg	Lng	TD
2004	DEN	14	0	75	396	5.3	29	3	5	80	**16.0**	**58**	0
2005	DEN	**15**	1	173	921	5.3	**68**	**8**	18	104	5.8	14	0
2006	DEN	13	**13**	**233**	**1,025**	4.4	51	2	**24**	**115**	4.8	16	0
2007	DET	5	5	44	182	4.1	24	1	14	63	4.5	15	0
2008	DEN	7	3	44	249	**5.7**	37	2	10	57	5.7	12	0
		54	22	569	2,773	4.9	68	16	71	419	5.9	58	0

=== Playoffs ===
Year	Team	Games		Rushing					Receiving				
Year	Team	GP	GS	Att	Yds	Avg	Lng	TD	Rec	Yds	Avg	Lng	TD
2004	DEN	1	0	**12**	49	4.1	**15**	**1**	4	**32**	**8.0**	**14**	0
2005	DEN	**2**	0	11	**50**	**4.5**	11	0	**5**	28	5.6	9	0
		3	0	23	99	4.3	15	1	9	60	6.7	14	0
