= Karl Paymah =

American football player (born 1982)

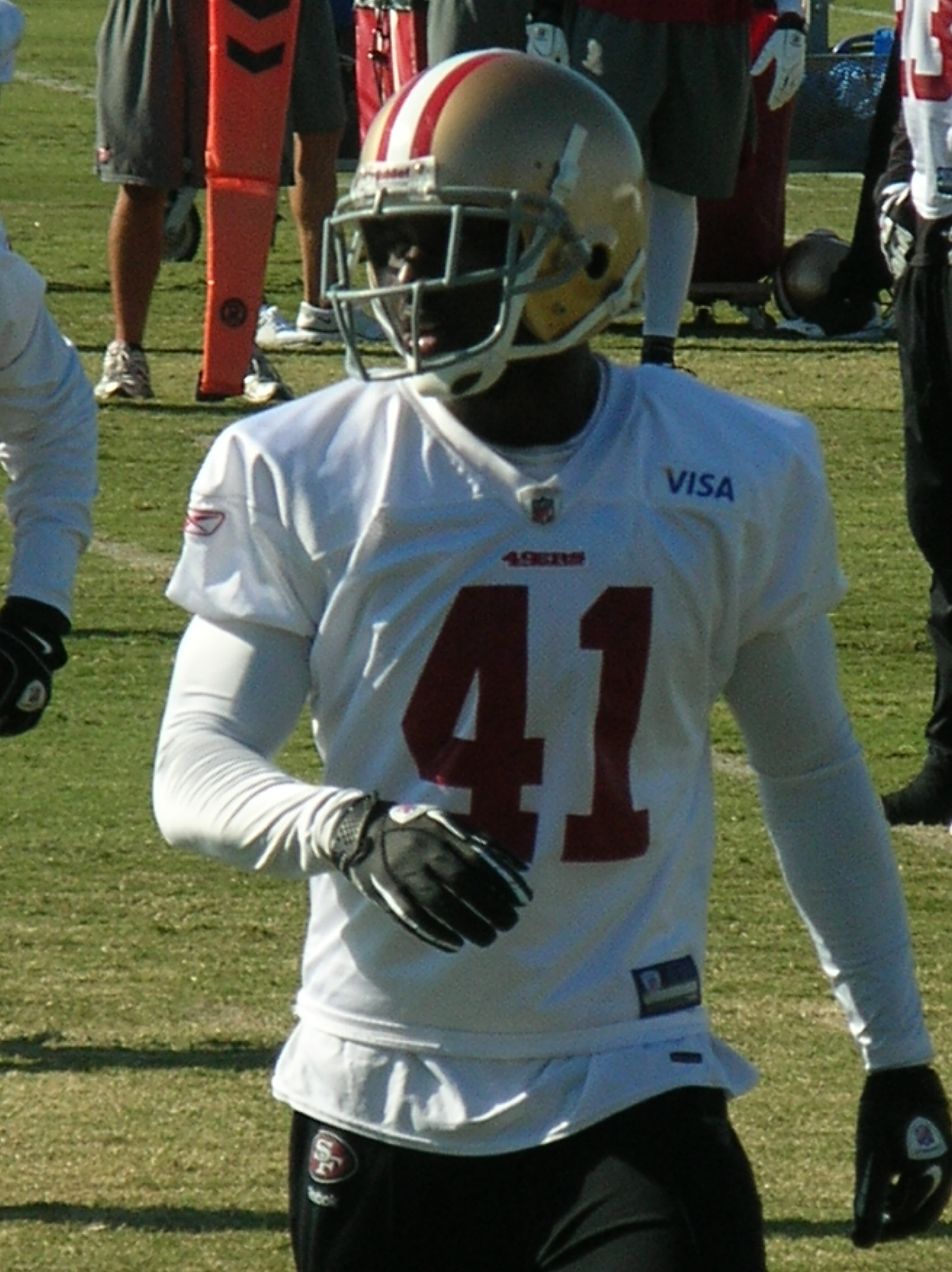
- Paymah with the San Francisco 49ers in 2010

No. 24, 41
- Position: Cornerback

Personal information
- Born: November 29, 1982 (age 43); Boston, Massachusetts, U.S.
- Listed height: 6 ft 0 in (1.83 m)
- Listed weight: 195 lb (88 kg)

Career information
- High school: Culver City (Culver City, California)
- College: Washington State
- NFL draft: 2005: 3rd round, 76th overall pick

Career history
- Denver Broncos (2005–2008); Minnesota Vikings (2009); San Francisco 49ers (2010)*; Houston Texans (2010); Saskatchewan Roughriders (2012)*
- * Offseason or practice squad member only

Career NFL statistics
- Total tackles: 130
- Forced fumbles: 1
- Fumble recoveries: 2
- Pass deflections: 14
- Interceptions: 3
- Stats at Pro Football Reference

Karl Paymah (born November 29, 1982) is an American former professional football player who was a cornerback in the National Football League (NFL). He was selected by the Denver Broncos in the third round of the 2005 NFL draft. He played college football for the Washington State Cougars.

Paymah was also a member of the Minnesota Vikings, San Francisco 49ers, Houston Texans, and Saskatchewan Roughriders.

== Early life ==
While attending Culver City High School in Culver City, California, Paymah was a two-sport standout in both football and track. In football, he won two varsity letters as both a wide receiver and a defensive back, and won first-team All-Ocean League honors as a defensive back.

== College career ==
Karl Paymah attended Washington State University and was a letterman in football. In football, he ended his career there with three interceptions, 129 tackles, and 21 pass deflections.

== Professional career ==
=== Denver Broncos ===
Paymah was drafted by the Denver Broncos in the third round of the 2005 NFL draft. In four years with the team he played in 60 games, recording 101 tackles and three interceptions.

=== Minnesota Vikings ===
Paymah signed with the Minnesota Vikings on March 14, 2009; the deal was reportedly worth $1.55 million for one year.

=== San Francisco 49ers ===
On March 17, 2010, Paymah signed a one-year deal with the San Francisco 49ers. On September 3, he was cut by the 49ers.

=== Houston Texans ===
Paymah signed with the Houston Texans on September 28, 2010.

== NFL career statistics ==
Legend
**Bold**	Career high

=== Regular season ===
Year	Team	Games		Tackles					Interceptions					Fumbles			
Year	Team	GP	GS	Cmb	Solo	Ast	Sck	TFL	Int	Yds	TD	Lng	PD	FF	FR	Yds	TD
2005	DEN	13	0	14	11	3	0.0	0	0	0	0	0	0	0	0	0	0
2006	DEN	**16**	0	26	23	3	0.0	0	0	0	0	0	2	0	**1**	0	0
2007	DEN	15	**3**	22	20	2	0.0	0	**2**	0	0	0	**5**	0	0	0	0
2008	DEN	**16**	2	**39**	**35**	**4**	0.0	**1**	1	**13**	0	**13**	**5**	0	**1**	0	0
2009	MIN	12	2	27	24	3	0.0	**1**	0	0	0	0	2	**1**	0	0	0
2010	HOU	2	0	2	2	0	0.0	0	0	0	0	0	0	0	0	0	0
Career		74	7	130	115	15	0.0	2	3	13	0	13	14	1	2	0	0

=== Playoffs ===
Year	Team	Games		Tackles					Interceptions					Fumbles			
Year	Team	GP	GS	Cmb	Solo	Ast	Sck	TFL	Int	Yds	TD	Lng	PD	FF	FR	Yds	TD
2005	DEN	**2**	0	**1**	**1**	0	0.0	0	0	0	0	0	0	0	0	0	0
Career		2	0	1	1	0	0.0	0	0	0	0	0	0	0	0	0	0
