= Rob Hunt (American football) =

American football player (born 1981)

No. 73, 72, 63, 53
- Position: Center

Personal information
- Born: March 3, 1981 (age 45); Cavalier, North Dakota, U.S.
- Listed height: 6 ft 3 in (1.91 m)
- Listed weight: 298 lb (135 kg)

Career information
- High school: Cavalier
- College: North Dakota State
- NFL draft: 2005: 5th round, 165th overall pick

Career history
- Indianapolis Colts (2005)*; Denver Broncos (2005–2006)*; Rhein Fire (2006); Kansas City Chiefs (2007)*; New Orleans VooDoo (2008); New Orleans Saints (2008)*
- * Offseason or practice squad member only

Awards and highlights
- GWFC Offensive Lineman of the Year (2004); FCS Rimington Trophy (2004); FCS All-American (2004); Hula Bowl Maui All-Star (2005)

Nathan Robert Hunt (born March 3, 1981) is an American former professional football player who was a center and a practice squad offensive lineman in the National Football League (NFL). He played college football for the North Dakota State Bison and was selected by the Indianapolis Colts in the fifth round of the 2005 NFL draft.

== Early life ==
Hunt attended Cavalier Public High School, where he was two-time All-Conference, All-Region, and All-State selection. He was also a three-time state wrestling qualifier and two-time state place winner, and state runner-up as a senior.

== College career ==
Hunt attended North Dakota State University, where he majored in Corporate/Community Health and Fitness. He started 42 games on the Offensive line. He redshirted as a true freshman in 2000.

As a redshirt freshman in 2001, he started 10 games. He helped the team average 35 points and 335 yards-per-game. As a sophomore in 2002, he started 10 games, and helped the team average 338.2 yards-per-game. As a junior in 2003, he started 11 games. He was named a team captain, he also helped the team average 30.1 points and 355.5 yards-per-game. He did not allow a quarterback sack and allowed just one quarterback pressure all season. He had 32 knockdown blocks and a 93.5% blocking consistency. In his Senior season, NDSU football transitioned to Division I FCS football. Hunt was a team captain, the Conference Offensive Lineman of the Year, an FCS All-American and was awarded the 2004 Rimington Trophy as the top center in FCS football. Hunt also played in the 2005 Hula Bowl Maui All-Star game held on January 22, 2005.

In July 2017, Hunt was named to the NDSU Bison All-Fargodome team representing the Division II era of Bison football in commemoration of the 25th Anniversary of the Fargodome.

== National Football League (2005–2008) ==
Pre-draft measurables
Height	Weight	Arm length	Hand span	40-yard dash	10-yard split	20-yard split	20-yard shuttle	Three-cone drill	Vertical jump	Broad jump	Bench press
6 ft 3 3/4 in (1.92 m)	301 lb (137 kg)	32 1/8 in (0.82 m)	10 1/4 in (0.26 m)	5.01 s	1.80 s	2.93 s	4.48 s	7.53 s	34.5 in (0.88 m)	9 ft 0 in (2.74 m)	31 reps
All values from NFL Combine

The Indianapolis Colts drafted Hunt in the fifth round of the 2005 NFL draft. Hunt was released by the Colts near the end of Training Camp on August 30, 2005, and was signed to the Denver Broncos' practice squad on September 4, 2005. Hunt spent the 2005 and 2006 seasons as a member of the Broncos practice squad,

== Europe ==
Hunt signed and played for the Rhein Fire in Germany of NFL Europe in the 2006 offseason.

Hunt was signed by the Kansas City Chiefs for the 2007 offseason and reported to training camp. Hunt appeared in preseason games on August 11, 2007, against the Cleveland Browns and August 16, 2007, against the Miami Dolphins, but was cut before the end of camp.

Hunt spent the 2008 NFL offseason with the New Orleans VooDoo, see below, before being signed by the New Orleans Saints on July 1, 2008. While with the Saints, he played in just one preseason game, against the Arizona Cardinals, and was inactive against Houston and Cincinnati. However, on August 25, he was waived by the team.

== Arena Football League (2008) ==
On November 28, 2007, Hunt signed with the New Orleans VooDoo of the Arena Football League, and played offensive line for the VooDoo throughout the 2008 season.

On June 24, 2008, the VooDoo placed him on the Exempt: Other league list, because he was attending training camp with the New Orleans Saints. On September 22, the VooDoo activated him from the Exempt: Other league list. The New Orleans VooDoo ceased operations on October 13, 2008, which entered Hunt as well as every other player for the VooDoo into the 2009 AFL Dispersal Draft. However, the Arena Football League subsequently cancelled the 2009 season leaving Hunt without both a team and a league.

After receiving no invites to NFL training camp for the 2009 NFL season and working out for a handful of NFL teams in the fall with no invites to a practice squad or roster, Hunt decided to retire from playing professional football.

== Coaching ==
Hunt served as an assistant offensive line/tight-end/strength and conditioning coach at Valley City State University during the 2009 season, taking over as the offensive coordinator in 2010, though retaining his duties with the offensive line and strength and conditioning. During his stint at VCSU, Hunt led the top rushing team in the Dakota Athletic Conference in 2010. VCSU also set a record-high 327 rushing yards against Dakota State and broke the record again later in the season, tallying 440 yards rushing against Mayville State (N.D.).

In 2011, Hunt joined the coaching staff of the Minnesota State University Moorhead Dragons, an NCAA Division II football school playing in the Northern Sun Intercollegiate Conference. Having served as offensive line coach, Hunt is currently the offensive coordinator for the Dragons. During Hunt's tenure as offensive coordinator, under the leadership of head coach Steve Laqua, the Dragon offense have set and broken numerous offensive records, including single-game yardage and single season yardage and the offense has posted top-five finishes in first downs in the nation. Back-to-Back Dragon quarterbacks have posted career yardage records for the school while Dragon running backs and receivers have posted school-record career numbers in yards, and receptions, and have been awarded all-conference, all-region and all-American honors.

On April 21, 2022, Hunt was named as the activities director at Valley City High School in Valley City, North Dakota effective August 1 of that year. Hunt returned to coaching in 2026 as an assistant football coach at Valley City High School. On September 14, 2026, Hunt was named the interim head coach at VCHS for the remainder of the season after head coach Chad Smith was fired prior to their game on September 11.

== See also ==
- List of Arena Football League and National Football League players
