= Paul Ernster =

American football player (born 1982)

No. 3, 7, 5
- Position: Punter

Personal information
- Born: January 26, 1982 (age 44); Phoenix, Arizona, U.S.
- Listed height: 6 ft 0 in (1.83 m)
- Listed weight: 217 lb (98 kg)

Career information
- High school: Ironwood (Glendale, Arizona)
- College: Northern Arizona
- NFL draft: 2005: 7th round, 239th overall pick

Career history
- Denver Broncos (2005–2006); Cleveland Browns (2007); Denver Broncos (2007); Detroit Lions (2008)*; Pittsburgh Steelers (2008)
- * Offseason or practice squad member only

Awards and highlights
- Consensus All-American (2004); 2× All-Big Sky (2003-2004)

Career NFL statistics
- Punts: 104
- Punt yards: 4,151
- Long punt: 61
- Stats at Pro Football Reference

Paul T. Ernster (born January 26, 1982) is an American former professional football player who was a punter in the National Football League (NFL). He played college football for the Northern Arizona Lumberjacks and was selected by the Denver Broncos in the seventh round of the 2005 NFL draft.

Ernster also was a member of the Cleveland Browns, Detroit Lions and Pittsburgh Steelers.

== Early life ==
Ernster was born in Phoenix, Arizona. He attended Ironwood High School in Glendale, Arizona, where he was a two-year letterman in both football and baseball. In football, he was an All-State kicker, he won All-Region honors as a linebacker, kicker, and punter, and was a two-time special teams Most Valuable Player award winner, and was the Defensive MVP as a senior.

== College career ==
Ernster attended Northern Arizona University, and was a kicker, until punting his senior year. As a senior punter, he led the NCAA Division I-AA level, and the nation in average yards per punt, averaging 47.8 yards per punt. During his career at Northern Arizona University, he was a three-time All-Big Sky Conference All-Academics selection, a consensus All-American punter pick as a senior, and he finished his college career with 213 points, which ranks third in school history. As a kicker, he made 39 out of 65 field goal attempts, and 96 out of 100 PATs attempted.

== Professional career ==
=== Denver Broncos ===
Ernster was selected by the Denver Broncos in the seventh round of the 2005 NFL draft with the 239th overall pick. He was their punter for two years, and was documented in A Few Seconds of Panic. After replacing Todd Sauerbrun in 2006, Ernster led the NFL in kickoff distance and was third in touchbacks. However, out of 32 punters with at least 40 punts, Ernster finished 28th with a gross average of 41.7 yards.

=== Detroit Lions ===
On April 11, 2008, Ernster was signed by the Detroit Lions. He was waived on July 29.

=== Pittsburgh Steelers ===
Ernster was claimed off waivers by the Pittsburgh Steelers on July 29, 2008, after punter Daniel Sepulveda tore his ACL. However, he was cut prior to the regular season. He was re-signed by the Steelers on November 5 after the team released punter Mitch Berger. The Steelers released Ernster and re-signed Berger on November 24 after Ernster turned in three below average performances, averaging just 31.3 yards a punt.

=== Career statistics ===
Kicking Stats
		G	FGM	FGA	PCT	1–19	20–29	30–39	40–49	50+	LNG	XPM	XPA	PTS
2005	DEN	1	0	0	0.0	0	0	0	0	0	0	0	0	0
2006	DEN	3	0	0	0.0	0	0	0	0	0	0	0	0	0

Punting Stats
YEAR	TEAM	G	ATT	AVG	LNG	YDS	BK	TB	TB%	IN20	IN20%	RET	YDS	AVG	NET
2006	DEN	3	17	44.6	61	759	0	2	11.8	4	23.5	9	104	11.6	38.5
