= Louis Green =

American football player (born 1979)

No. 53, 52
- Position: Linebacker

Personal information
- Born: September 23, 1979 (age 47); Vicksburg, Mississippi, U.S.
- Listed height: 6 ft 3 in (1.91 m)
- Listed weight: 237 lb (108 kg)

Career information
- High school: Lorman (MS) Jefferson Co.
- College: Alcorn State
- NFL draft: 2002: undrafted

Career history
- Baltimore Ravens (2002)*; Amsterdam Admirals (2003); Denver Broncos (2003–2008)
- * Offseason or practice squad member only

Career NFL statistics
- Total tackles: 44
- Forced fumbles: 2
- Fumble recoveries: 1
- Stats at Pro Football Reference

Louis Edward Green (born September 23, 1979) is an American former professional football player who was a linebacker for the Denver Broncos of the National Football League (NFL). Green attended Jefferson County High School in Fayette, Mississippi and lettered in football. He played college football for the Alcorn State Braves.

On February 19, 2007, the Broncos resigned Green to a 3-year, $2.5 million contract with a $300,000 signing bonus. In 2006 he won the Ed Block award from the Broncos.

On June 16, 2009, he was released.
