= George Foster (American football) =

American football player (born 1980)

No. 72, 69
- Position: Offensive tackle

Personal information
- Born: June 9, 1980 (age 46); Macon, Georgia, U.S.
- Listed height: 6 ft 5 in (1.96 m)
- Listed weight: 338 lb (153 kg)

Career information
- High school: Macon (GA) Southeast
- College: Georgia
- NFL draft: 2003: 1st round, 20th overall pick

Career history
- Denver Broncos (2003–2006); Detroit Lions (2007–2008); Cleveland Browns (2009)*; Omaha Nighthawks (2010–2011); New Orleans Saints (2011)*; Indianapolis Colts (2012)*
- * Offseason or practice squad member only

Career NFL statistics
- Games played: 68
- Games started: 57
- Fumble recoveries: 2
- Stats at Pro Football Reference

George Foster (born June 9, 1980) is an American former professional football player who was an offensive tackle in the National Football League (NFL). He was selected by the Denver Broncos 20th overall in the 2003 NFL draft. He played college football for the Georgia Bulldogs.

Foster was also a member of the Detroit Lions, Cleveland Browns and Omaha Nighthawks.

== College career ==
The 2000 season saw the then sophomore Foster earn the backup left tackle position. He was one of the first men off of the Georgia bench and earned extensive playing time during the season, including Georgia's 37–14 win over Virginia in the Oahu Bowl.

At the conclusion of the 2001 spring drills, George Foster was named as the number one split tackle for the Bulldogs. He started nine games during the 2001 season as Georgia culminated their season against Boston College in the Music City Bowl.

During his senior season in 2002 at the University of Georgia, Foster was part of an offensive line that helped the Bulldogs finish with a #3 national ranking in both major polls and also helped the team win a school record 13 games, including victories in the SEC Championship game and the 2003 Nokia Sugar Bowl. Foster and the offensive line paved the way for the Bulldog offense all season long, as it averaged an SEC-best 32 points per game and garnered an offensive passing efficiency of 138.9. For his efforts, Foster was selected to play in the 2003 Senior Bowl, the NCAA's post-season all-star game.

== Professional career ==
Pre-draft measurables
| Height | Weight | Arm length | Hand span | Vertical jump | Broad jump |
|---|---|---|---|---|---|
| 6 ft 5 in (1.96 m) | 338 lb (153 kg) | 34 3/4 in (0.88 m) | 10 in (0.25 m) | 27 in (0.69 m) | 8 ft 4 in (2.54 m) |
All values from NFL Combine.

=== Denver Broncos ===
Foster was drafted by the Denver Broncos in the first round with the 20th overall pick in the 2003 NFL draft.

In 2004, Foster started all 16 games at right tackle and did not miss an offensive snap. Foster was part of a line that set a franchise record by allowing only 15 sacks, breaking the previous best of 22 sacks set in 1971. Foster helped rookie Tatum Bell post the first 100-yard game of his career, marking only the second time in franchise history that three different Broncos have had at least one 100-yard game in a season.

Foster started all 16 games for the Broncos in 2005. He helped block for Mike Anderson who rushed for 1,014 yards and Tatum Bell who rushed for 921 yards. The team gained the second-most rushing yards (2,539) in Bronco history and the second-best rushing offense in the NFL.

During his time in Denver, Foster was the official spokesman for the Broncos' offensive line, while the rest of the unit adhered to a longstanding media boycott that began in 1995.

=== Detroit Lions ===
On March 1, 2007, Foster was traded along with teammate Tatum Bell and a 5th round draft pick to the Detroit Lions in exchange for cornerback Dré Bly. He was released on June 1, 2009.

=== Cleveland Browns ===
Foster signed with the Cleveland Browns on June 5, 2009. He was released on August 24.

=== Omaha Nighthawks ===
Foster was signed by the Omaha Nighthawks of the United Football League on August 21, 2010. He was re-signed by the team on July 15, 2011.

=== New Orleans Saints ===
On August 3, 2011, Foster signed with the New Orleans Saints.

=== Indianapolis Colts ===
Foster was signed by the Indianapolis Colts on May 29, 2012. He was placed on injured reserve on August 27 and released on August 31, 2012.

== Personal life ==
Foster is a native of Macon, Georgia. On May 7, 2019, Foster was inducted into the Macon Sports Hall of Fame.
