= Larry Coyer =

American football player and coach (1943–2023)

Biographical details
- Born: April 19, 1943; Huntington, West Virginia, U.S.
- Died: February 10, 2023 (aged 79)

Playing career
- 1961–1964: Marshall
- Position: Defensive back

Coaching career (HC unless noted)
- 1965–1967: Marshall (DB)
- 1968–1969: Martins Ferry HS (OH)
- 1970–1972: Massillon HS (OH) (DC/DB)
- 1973: Bowling Green (DB)
- 1974–1977: Iowa (DC)
- 1978: Oklahoma State (DC)
- 1979–1982: Iowa State (DC)
- 1983–1984: Michigan Panthers (LB)
- 1985: Memphis Showboats (DC)
- 1986: Memphis (DC)
- 1987–1989: UCLA (LB)
- 1990: Houston (AHC/DC/DB)
- 1991–1992: Ohio State (DB)
- 1993: East Carolina (DC)
- 1994: New York Jets (DL)
- 1995–1996: Iowa State (DC)
- 1997–1999: Pittsburgh (DC)
- 2000–2002: Denver Broncos (LB)
- 2003–2006: Denver Broncos (DC)
- 2007–2008: Tampa Bay Buccaneers (AHC/DL)
- 2009–2011: Indianapolis Colts (DC)
- 2013: Washington Redskins (scout)
- 2014: New Mexico State (DC)

Larry Coyer (April 19, 1943 – February 10, 2023) was an American football coach. He served as the defensive coordinator for the Indianapolis Colts of the National Football League (NFL) from 2009 to 2011. Prior to the Colts, he was the assistant head coach for the Tampa Bay Buccaneers and defensive coordinator for the Denver Broncos and New Mexico State.

== Playing career and high school coaching ==
Coyer was an outstanding player at Barboursville High School in Barboursville, West Virginia during the late 1950s

A 1964 graduate of Marshall University, Coyer is a member of the Football Hall of Fame at Marshall for his achievements as a player. He began his coaching career at his alma mater in 1965 as secondary coach, a position he maintained through 1967. An additional coaching stint came at the acclaimed Massillon Washington High School, where NFL Legend Paul Brown once coached.

== Denver Broncos ==
In his 42nd year of coaching on either the collegiate or professional level, Coyer began his Broncos coaching career as the club's linebackers coach from 2000 to 2002 before he was promoted to defensive coordinator. Larry Coyer entered his seventh, and final, season on the Denver Broncos' coaching staff in 2006 and his fourth in the role of defensive coordinator.

Coyer's defense consistently ranked among the NFL's most productive during his three seasons as the Broncos' defensive coordinator and helped the club advance to the playoffs each year. The Broncos placed in the league's top-7 in run defense in every year under Coyer and allowed an average of 93.3 rushing yards per game between 2003 and 2006 (ranking second in the NFL during that period).

Denver also ranked among the league's best teams in overall defense under Coyer, posting consecutive top-4 NFL rankings in yards-per-game allowed from 2003 to 2004 and placing fourth in the league (289.5 ypg.) in that category for the period 2003–2006. In addition, the Broncos surrendered an average of 18.0 points per game between 2003 and 2006 to rank fifth in the NFL in scoring defense with Coyer at the helm. Coyer's defense was instrumental in the Broncos going 13–3 in 2005 and advancing to the AFC Championship Game. Denver, which, in 2005, sent cornerback Champ Bailey, safety John Lynch and linebacker Al Wilson to the Pro Bowl, ranked second in the NFL in run defense (85.2 ypg.) and posted the third-best such mark in franchise history. The Broncos allowed only 16.1 points per game to tie for third in the NFL and surrendered a total of 37 points in their final four games (9.3 ppg.) en route to capturing the AFC West title.

Coyer began his Broncos coaching career as their linebackers coach from 2000 to 2002. In Coyer's first year instructing Denver's linebackers in 2000, John Mobley and fellow linebacker Bill Romanowski finished first and second on the team in tackles (133 and 121) while Wilson ranked fourth (104).

In his first year as the Broncos' defensive coordinator in 2003, Denver's defense allowed an average of only 277.1 yards per game. The team ranked fourth in the NFL, and earned its first postseason berth since 2000. Coyer, who also instructed the team's linebackers, worked closely with Wilson during his Pro Bowl season that saw him lead the Broncos in tackles (128) for the second consecutive year.

In 2004, Coyer's defense featured two Pro Bowl selections: Lynch and Bailey, who also earned the first All-Pro nomination of his career after joining the Broncos in an offseason trade. Coyer aided in the development of rookie linebacker D.J. Williams, who became only the second Broncos rookie and the first in 32 years to lead the team in tackles (114). Along the way, Williams was the only 2004 rookie to be named AFC Defensive Player of the Week (Wk. 16) and finished No. 3 in the NFL Defensive Rookie of the Year voting.

On January 8, 2007, Coyer was released from the Denver Broncos after the 2006 season. His release was the result of a defensive meltdown in the second half of the season. On January 18, 2007, the Bucs hired him as their defensive line coach.

== USFL coaching ==
Coyer's other professional coaching experience came in the United States Football League as linebackers coach with the Michigan Panthers (1983–84) and defensive coordinator with the Memphis Showboats (1985–86). Coyer helped Michigan capture the inaugural USFL championship in 1983 with a win against Philadelphia in a game played at Mile High Stadium in Denver.

== NCAA coaching ==
Coyer was the defensive coordinator in 1993 at East Carolina, where under his guidance the Pirates improved in virtually every defensive category. He also served as defensive backs coach at Ohio State (1991–92), assistant head coach/defensive backs coach at Houston (1990) and linebackers coach at UCLA (1987–89). Coyer was also defensive coordinator at Memphis State (1986) Iowa State (1979–82), Oklahoma State (1978) and Iowa (1974–77) after serving as defensive backs coach at Bowling Green (1968–73).

Before his stint at Pittsburgh, Coyer was defensive coordinator at Iowa State University for two seasons (1995–96). That post was preceded by a one-year assignment as defensive line coach for the New York Jets in 1994. While at Pitt (1997–99) as its defensive coordinator, Coyer directed a defensive unit that showed significant improvement each season, culminating in a 1999 showing that included top-5 rankings in the Big East Conference in all major defensive statistical categories. Two of his standouts, safety Ramon Walker and defensive lineman Demond Gibson, earned All-Big East Conference honors that season. In 1998, the Panthers ranked third in the Big East in total defense, and over the course of the 1997–98 seasons, the unit amassed 62 sacks, the highest two-season total at Pittsburgh since 1990–91.

In February 2014, Coyer was hired as the defensive coordinator for New Mexico State.

== Personal life and death ==
Coyer died on February 10, 2023, at the age of 79.

== See also ==
- List of NCAA major college yearly punt and kickoff return leaders
