= Darrent Williams =

American football player (1982–2007)

- Williams in 2006

No. 27
- Position: Cornerback

Personal information
- Born: September 27, 1982; Fort Worth, Texas, U.S.
- Died: January 1, 2007 (aged 24); Denver, Colorado, U.S.
- Listed height: 5 ft 8 in (1.73 m)
- Listed weight: 188 lb (85 kg)

Career information
- High school: O. D. Wyatt (Fort Worth)
- College: Oklahoma State (2001–2004)
- NFL draft: 2005: 2nd round, 56th overall pick

Career history
- Denver Broncos (2005–2006)

Awards and highlights
- PFWA All-Rookie Team (2005)

Career NFL statistics
- Total tackles: 139
- Sacks: 1
- Forced fumbles: 2
- Fumble recoveries: 3
- Interceptions: 6
- Defensive touchdowns: 2
- Stats at Pro Football Reference

Darrent Demarcus Williams (September 27, 1982 – January 1, 2007) was an American professional football player who was a cornerback for the Denver Broncos of the National Football League (NFL). After attending high school in Fort Worth, Texas, Williams played football at Oklahoma State University. He was a second-round draft pick by the Broncos in 2005. Williams was killed in a drive-by shooting the day after he finished his second season with the Broncos.

== Early life ==
Darrent Demarcus Williams born on Monday, September 27, 1982, and raised in Fort Worth, Texas, Williams attended O. D. Wyatt High School, where he played cornerback and was also a punt returner. As a senior, he was named 7-4A Defensive Most Valuable Player after posting five interceptions that featured several long returns, including a best of 54 yards. As a punt returner, Williams averaged 30 yards per return with four touchdowns.

Williams received little recruiting attention during high school, receiving offers only from Texas Christian University, Louisiana Tech University and Oklahoma State University.

== College career ==
Williams played college football for Oklahoma State University. He played ten games his first year, becoming a starter during the second half of the season. In Williams' freshman year, he returned two interceptions for touchdowns against Baylor. During the post-game press-conference, it was revealed that he had predicted he would do this in a statement to then head coach, Les Miles. As a sophomore, Williams started all of the team's thirteen games, recording 53 tackles and three interceptions, while breaking up 13 passes.

During his junior year, Williams continued to start for the Cowboys. He posted 66 tackles and six interceptions (third in the Big 12 Conference). He also broke up 17 passes. His junior-year performance earned him first-team All-Big 12 Conference honors.

Williams' played in only seven games in his last year at Oklahoma State. He missed the last three games because of injury and was limited before that because of an arm injury. Still, Williams totaled 21 tackles (18 solo), three pass breakups, two forced fumbles and one fumble recovery, which he returned 53 yards. Williams finished his collegiate career tied for first place all-time in Division I college football in career interception returns for touchdowns. He had 11 career interceptions and scored 9 touchdowns on returns (5 interception returns, 3 punt returns and 1 blocked extra point return).

== Professional career ==
=== 2005 NFL Combine ===
Pre-draft measurables
Height	Weight	40-yard dash	10-yard split	20-yard split	20-yard shuttle	Three-cone drill	Vertical jump	Broad jump	Bench press
5 ft 8 5/8 in (1.74 m)	176 lb (80 kg)	4.34 s	1.51 s	2.60 s	3.96 s	6.97 s	39.0 in (0.99 m)	10 ft 4 in (3.15 m)	16 reps
All values from NFL Combine

Williams was selected by the Denver Broncos in the second round (56th overall) in the 2005 NFL draft. He recorded his first career interception on November 13, 2005, versus the Oakland Raiders. The Raiders were driving to score, when quarterback Kerry Collins attempted a pass to wide receiver Jerry Porter. Williams jumped the route, intercepted the ball and took it 82 yards for the touchdown. The Broncos won the game, 31–17.

Williams established himself as the Broncos' starting cornerback, recording 58 tackles and two interceptions. He also led the Broncos in punt and kick returns. His nine starts at cornerback in 2005 were the most for a Broncos rookie at that position since Louis Wright started 11 games in 1975. An injury kept Williams out of the Broncos' lineup for the last three games of the season. Williams was recognized as a first-team All-Rookie selection by Pro Football Weekly and the Pro Football Writers Association.

Williams played in 15 games during the 2006 season, recording 86 tackles (77 solo) and four interceptions (returning one for a touchdown), as well as serving as the team's primary punt returner. His last game was a season-ending home loss to the San Francisco 49ers. In that game, played mere hours before his death, Williams had three tackles and returned two punts for 50 yards before leaving the game with a shoulder injury late in the second half.

For his career, Williams had 1 sack, 2 forced fumbles, 6 interceptions, and 2 touchdowns.

== Death ==
On Monday, January 1, 2007, Williams was killed during a drive-by shooting at approximately 2:10 AM (09:10 GMT). Williams and two other passengers were shot when another vehicle pulled beside his rented Hummer H2 limousine in downtown Denver, Colorado. The shooting occurred near 11th Ave. and Speer Blvd. The shooting happened less than 12 hours after the Broncos played their final game of the 2006 season against the San Francisco 49ers in Denver.

Williams had been attending a New Year's Eve party and birthday party held for and by Denver Nuggets player Kenyon Martin at a nightclub, Shelter. The Denver Police Department reported that the shooting was preceded by some type of altercation or argument at the nightclub between Crips gang members and other patrons, one of whom was Broncos teammate Brandon Marshall. A police spokesman said, "There was some confrontation between a group of people in the vehicle and a group at the nightclub." Williams was not involved in the altercation. Marshall was "one of the instigators of the fight" according to a report by ESPN.

According to the county coroner's office, Williams sustained a single gunshot wound to the neck, killing him almost instantly. After Williams was shot, he fell in the lap of Broncos teammate Javon Walker. He was pronounced dead around 2:30 AM (09:30 GMT). The two other passengers injured in the shooting were both released from the hospital the day after.

Williams was survived by his wife and two children, a seven-year-old son and four-year-old daughter.

=== Aftermath ===
The Denver police impounded a vehicle in connection with the shooting. The vehicle was registered to Brian Hicks, a 27-year-old Crips gang member, who was already incarcerated awaiting trial for attempted murder and drug charges.

On May 29, 2008, the Darrent Williams Memorial Teen Center was opened at the Denver Broncos Branch of Boys & Girls Clubs of Metro Denver.

On May 30, 2008, the Rocky Mountain News published a story claiming that it had obtained a signed confession letter by Crips gang member Willie D. Clark, in which he admitted to firing the shot that killed Williams. In 2010, Willie Clark was convicted of Darrent's murder, and sentenced to life in prison with an additional 1,152 years.

== See also ==
- List of gridiron football players who died during their careers
