= 2000 San Diego Chargers season =

NFL team 41st season

- Owner: Alex Spanos
- Head coach: Mike Riley
- Home stadium: Qualcomm Stadium

Results
- Record: 1–15
- Division place: 5th AFC West
- Playoffs: Did not qualify
- All-Pros: 1: LB Junior Seau (1st team)
- Pro Bowlers: 2: P Darren Bennett; LB Junior Seau

The 2000 season was the San Diego Chargers' 31st in the National Football League (NFL), their 41st overall and their second under head coach Mike Riley. The Chargers failed to improve on their 8–8 record from 1999, and finished the season 1–15, the worst record of any Chargers team in history. The team lost its first eleven games before their only victory of the season against the Kansas City Chiefs (by one point, which was obtained on a last-second field goal), who were led by 44-yr-old QB Warren Moon that day. The 2000 Chargers were also the first team to finish 1–15 and have their only win of the season be at home. Oddly enough, out of the eleven teams in NFL history to finish 1–15, only three others had their only win at home (2007 Miami Dolphins, 2016 Cleveland Browns, and 2020 Jacksonville Jaguars). The Chargers were also the third 1–15 team to win their lone game by a single point; the others, the 1980 New Orleans Saints and 1991 Indianapolis Colts, each defeated the New York Jets on the road. It was also quarterback Ryan Leaf’s final season with the Chargers.

San Diego had a historically inept running attack in 2000; their 1,062 total team rushing yards (66.4 per game) is the lowest total of rushing yards by any team in NFL history in a 16-game season. For perspective, the strike-shortened 1982 NFL season—which was a nine-game schedule—included thirteen teams who rushed for more yards than San Diego did in 2000, and the 1992 Seattle Seahawks, who scored only 140 points in 16 games, rushed for 1,596 yards.

Despite this, there were a few bright spots; Darren Bennett and Junior Seau would be selected for the Pro Bowl that year.

After their miserable season, the Chargers earned the first overall pick in the next season's draft. The Chargers would trade that pick to the Falcons and draft LaDainian Tomlinson and also Drew Brees.

The last remaining active member of the 2000 San Diego Chargers was David Binn, who played his final NFL game in the 2011 playoffs, although he played his final regular season game in 2010.

== Offseason ==
Additions	Subtractions
DE Neil Smith (Broncos)	RB Natrone Means (Panthers)
WR Curtis Conway (Bears)	CB Terrance Shaw (Dolphins)
CB DeRon Jenkins (Ravens)	DT Norman Hand (Saints)
G Kevin Gogan (Dolphins)	
T Ben Coleman (Jaguars)	
LB Steve Tovar (Panthers)	

=== NFL draft ===
2000 San Diego Chargers draft
Round	Pick	Player	Position	College	Notes
2	43	Rogers Beckett	Safety	Marshall	
3	83	Damion McIntosh	Tackle	Kansas State	
4	111	Trevor Gaylor	Wide receiver	Miami (OH)	from Philadelphia
4	113	Leonardo Carson	Defensive tackle	Auburn	from Detroit via Philadelphia
6	184	Shannon Taylor	Linebacker	Virginia	
6	203	Damen Wheeler	Cornerback	Colorado	
6	205	Ja'Juan Seider	Quarterback	Florida A&M	
7	222	Jason Thomas	Guard	Hampton	
Made roster * Made at least one Pro Bowl during career

=== Undrafted free agents ===
2000 undrafted free agents of note
Player	Position	College
Pat Batteaux	Wide receiver	TCU
Mike Burton	Quarterback	Trinity
Robert Cooper	Running back	Cincinnati

== Personnel ==
=== Staff ===
2000 San Diego Chargers staff
Front office: Chairman of the board – Alex Spanos; President/vice chairman – Dean Spanos; Executive vice president – Michael Spanos; Vice president of football operations – Ed McGuire; Director of player personnel – Billy Devaney; Director of pro personnel – Greg Gaines; Director of college scouting – Jimmy Raye; Head coaches: Head coach – Mike Riley; Offensive coaches: Offensive supervisor/offensive line – Joe Bugel; Offensive coordinator – Geep Chryst; Quarterbacks – Mike Johnson; Running backs – Ollie Wilson; Wide receivers – Mike Sanford; Tight ends – Paul Chryst; Offensive assistant/quality control – DelVaughn Alexander	Defensive coaches: Defensive coordinator – Joe Pascale; Defensive line – Wayne Nunnely; Linebackers – Jim Vechiarella; Defensive backs – Rod Perry; Defensive assistant/secondary – Mark Banker; Defensive assistant/quality control – Andrew McClave; Special teams coaches: Special teams – Bruce Read; Strength and conditioning: Strength and conditioning – John Hastings; Assistant strength and conditioning – Mike Schleelein

=== Roster ===
2000 San Diego Chargers roster
Quarterbacks (QB): 4 Jim Harbaugh; 16 Ryan Leaf; 13 Moses Moreno; Running backs (RB): 43 Kenny Bynum KR; 32 Robert Chancey; 35 Jermaine Fazande; 41 Terrell Fletcher; 28 Ronney Jenkins KR; 44 Fred McCrary FB; Wide receivers (WR): 80 Curtis Conway; 82 Trevor Gaylor; 81 Jeff Graham; 87 Reggie Jones PR; Tight ends (TE): 84 Reggie Davis; 83 Steve Heiden; 88 Freddie Jones	Offensive linemen (OL): 62 Ben Coleman T; 67 Roman Fortin C; 66 Kevin Gogan G; 71 DeMingo Graham G/T; 64 Kendyl Jacox C/G; 77 Damion McIntosh T; 70 Vaughn Parker T; 74 Raleigh Roundtree G; 65 Jason Thomas G; Defensive linemen (DL): 90 Adrian Dingle DE; 95 Albert Fontenot DE; 92 Darren Mickell DE; 97 John Parrella DT; 72 Mike Pringley DE; 93 Antoine Simpson DT; 91 Neil Smith DE; 76 Jamal Williams DT	Linebackers (LB): 51 Gerald Dixon OLB; 53 Deon Humphrey OLB; 52 John Reeves OLB; 56 Orlando Ruff MLB; 55 Junior Seau OLB; 94 Shannon Taylor OLB; 59 Steve Tovar OLB; Defensive backs (DB): 42 Rogers Beckett FS; 24 Fakhir Brown CB; 27 Tony Darden CB; 22 Tim Denton CB; 20 Mike Dumas FS; 37 Rodney Harrison SS; 29 Armon Hatcher SS; 23 DeRon Jenkins CB; 26 Darryll Lewis CB; 21 Scott Turner CB; Special teams (ST): 2 Darren Bennett P; 50 David Binn LS; 3 John Carney K	Practice squad: 86 Pat Batteaux WR; 60 Wilbert Brown G; -- Frank Ferrara DE; 49 Terrence McCaskey TE; Reserve: 96 Leonardo Carson DT (IR); 54 Eric Hill LB (IR); 47 Greg Jackson S (IR); 99 Raylee Johnson DE (IR); 98 Mike Mohring DT (IR); 31 Jason Perry S (IR); 25 Reggie Rusk S (IR); Rookies in italics 53 active, 7 reserve, 4 practice squad

== Preseason ==
Week	Date	Opponent	Result	Record	Venue
1	August 5	at San Francisco 49ers	W 23–20	1–0	3Com Park
2	August 12	Minnesota Vikings	W 31–7	2–0	Qualcomm Stadium
3	August 18	at Atlanta Falcons	W 28–14	3–0	Georgia Dome
4	August 25	Arizona Cardinals	W 24–20	4–0	Qualcomm Stadium

== Regular season ==
=== Schedule ===
Week	Date	Opponent	Result	Record	Venue	Recap
1	September 3	at **Oakland Raiders**	**L** 6–9	0–1	Network Associates Coliseum	Recap
2	September 10	New Orleans Saints	**L** 27–28	0–2	Qualcomm Stadium	Recap
3	September 17	at **Kansas City Chiefs**	**L** 10–42	0–3	Arrowhead Stadium	Recap
4	September 24	**Seattle Seahawks**	**L** 12–20	0–4	Qualcomm Stadium	Recap
5	October 1	at St. Louis Rams	**L** 31–57	0–5	Trans World Dome	Recap
6	October 8	**Denver Broncos**	**L** 7–21	0–6	Qualcomm Stadium	Recap
7	October 15	at Buffalo Bills	**L** 24–27 (OT)	0–7	Ralph Wilson Stadium	Recap
8	Bye					
9	October 29	**Oakland Raiders**	**L** 13–15	0–8	Qualcomm Stadium	Recap
10	November 5	at **Seattle Seahawks**	**L** 15–17	0–9	Husky Stadium	Recap
11	November 12	Miami Dolphins	**L** 7–17	0–10	Qualcomm Stadium	Recap
12	November 19	at **Denver Broncos**	**L** 37–38	0–11	Mile High Stadium	Recap
13	November 26	**Kansas City Chiefs**	**W** 17–16	1–11	Qualcomm Stadium	Recap
14	December 3	San Francisco 49ers	**L** 17–45	1–12	Qualcomm Stadium	Recap
15	December 10	at Baltimore Ravens	**L** 3–24	1–13	PSINet Stadium	Recap
16	December 17	at Carolina Panthers	**L** 22–30	1–14	Ericsson Stadium	Recap
17	December 24	Pittsburgh Steelers	**L** 21–34	1–15	Qualcomm Stadium	Recap
Note: Intra-division opponents are in **bold** text.

=== Game summaries ===
==== Week 1: at Oakland Raiders ====
Week One: San Diego Chargers at Oakland Raiders – Game summary

Quarter	1	2	3	4	Total
Chargers	0	0	0	6	**6**
**Raiders**	0	0	2	7	**9**

at Network Associates Coliseum, Oakland, California

- Date: September 3
- Game time: 1:15 p.m. PDT
- Game weather: 64 °F (18 °C), relative humidity 49%, wind 10 mph
- Game attendance: 56,373
- Referee: Ron Blum
- TV announcers (CBS): Gus Johnson and Brent Jones
- Box score

Game information

**First quarter**

- No scoring plays.

**Second quarter**

- No scoring plays.

**Third quarter**

- OAK – Safety, Darrell Russell tackled Robert Chancey in end zone, 7:23. Raiders 2–0.

**Fourth quarter**

- SDG – Robert Chancey 3-yard run (pass failed), 9:41. Chargers 6–2. **Drive: 15 plays, 80 yards, 5:36.**
- OAK – Andre Rison 10-yard pass from Rich Gannon (Sebastian Janikowski kick), 2:37. Raiders 9–6. **Drive: 8 plays, 53 yards, 2:53.**

**Top passers**

- SDG – Ryan Leaf – 17/39, 180 yards, 3 INT
- OAK – Rich Gannon – 20/35, 176 yards, TD

**Top rushers**

- SDG – Robert Chancey – 23 rushes, 74 yards, TD
- OAK – Tyrone Wheatley – 13 rushes, 47 yards

**Top receivers**

- SDG – Jeff Graham – 4 receptions, 62 yards
- OAK – Andre Rison – 5 receptions, 49 yards, TD

==== Week 2: vs. New Orleans Saints ====
Week Two: New Orleans Saints at San Diego Chargers – Game summary

Quarter	1	2	3	4	Total
**Saints**	7	6	6	9	**28**
Chargers	3	21	0	3	**27**

at Qualcomm Stadium, San Diego, California

- Date: September 10
- Game time: 1:15 p.m. PDT
- Game weather: 76 °F (24 °C), relative humidity 41%, wind 8 mph
- Game attendance: 51,300
- Referee: Dick Hantak
- TV announcers (FOX): Scott Graham, Billy Ray Smith and Joe Trahan
- Box score

Game information

**First quarter**

- SDG – John Carney 42-yard field goal, 6:39. Chargers 3–0. **Drive: 6 plays, 22 yards, 1:45.**
- NO – Joe Horn 6-yard pass from Jeff Blake (Doug Brien kick), 2:00. Saints 7–3. **Drive: 8 plays, 76 yards, 4:39.**

**Second quarter**

- SDG – Robert Chancey 3-yard run (John Carney kick), 14:20. Chargers 10–7. **Drive: 5 plays, 48 yards, 2:40.**
- SDG – Curtis Conway 20-yard pass from Ryan Leaf (John Carney kick), 7:04. Chargers 17–7. **Drive: 6 plays, 50 yards, 3:12.**
- NO – Doug Brien 20-yard field goal, 1:54. Chargers 17–10. **Drive: 13 plays, 64 yards, 5:10.**
- SDG – Ronney Jenkins 93-yard kickoff return (John Carney kick), 1:37. Chargers 24–10.
- NO – Doug Brien 20-yard field goal, 0:00. Chargers 24–13. **Drive: 9 plays, 65 yards, 1:37.**

**Third quarter**

- NO – Ricky Williams 13-yard pass from Jeff Blake (pass failed), 2:54. Chargers 24–19. **Drive: 8 plays, 41 yards, 5:17.**

**Fourth quarter**

- NO – Doug Brien 31-yard field goal, 14:52. Chargers 24–22. **Drive: 4 plays, 8 yards, 1:12.**
- SDG – John Carney 49-yard field goal, 5:08. Chargers 27–22. **Drive: 4 plays, 4 yards, 2:16.**
- NO – Joe Horn 8-yard pass from Jeff Blake (pass failed), 0:47. Saints 28–27. **Drive: 10 plays, 90 yards, 4:21.**

**Top passers**

- NO – Jeff Blake – 33/46, 259 yards, 3 TD, 2 INT
- SDG – Ryan Leaf – 12/24, 134 yards, TD, 2 INT

**Top rushers**

- NO – Ricky Williams – 24 rushes, 50 yards
- SDG – Robert Chancey – 15 rushes, 59 yards, TD

**Top receivers**

- NO – Joe Horn – 12 receptions, 116 yards, 2 TD
- SDG – Jeff Graham – 3 receptions, 46 yards

==== Week 3: at Kansas City Chiefs ====
Week Three: San Diego Chargers at Kansas City Chiefs – Game summary

Quarter	1	2	3	4	Total
Chargers	10	0	0	0	**10**
**Chiefs**	0	14	14	14	**42**

at Arrowhead Stadium, Kansas City, Missouri

- Date: September 17
- Game time: 3:05 p.m. CDT
- Game weather: 88 °F (31.1 °C), relative humidity 26%, no wind
- Game attendance: 77,604
- Referee: Johnny Grier
- TV announcers (CBS): Ian Eagle and Mark May
- Box score

Game information

**First quarter**

- SDG – Mike Dumas 56-yard interception return (John Carney kick), 10:22. Chargers 7–0.
- SDG – John Carney 54-yard field goal, 1:19. Chargers 10–0. **Drive: 11 plays, 47 yards, 6:44.**

**Second quarter**

- KAN – Sylvester Morris 36-yard pass from Elvis Grbac (Pete Stoyanovich kick), 10:12. Chargers 10–7. **Drive: 5 plays, 9 yards, 1:26.**
- KAN – Tony Richardson 1-yard pass from Elvis Grbac (Pete Stoyanovich kick), 0:47. Chiefs 14–10. **Drive: 3 plays, 41 yards, 0:54.**

**Third quarter**

- KAN – Sylvester Morris 9-yard pass from Elvis Grbac (Pete Stoyanovich kick), 7:26. Chiefs 21–10. **Drive: 5 plays, 9 yards, 1:26.**
- KAN – Troy Drayton 2-yard pass from Elvis Grbac (Pete Stoyanovich kick), 4:38. Chiefs 28–10. **Drive: 5 plays, 9 yards, 1:26.**

**Fourth quarter**

- KAN – Sylvester Morris 20-yard pass from Elvis Grbac (Pete Stoyanovich kick), 12:26. Chiefs 35–10. **Drive: 5 plays, 9 yards, 1:26.**
- KAN – Frank Moreau 1-yard run (Pete Stoyanovich kick), 1:57. Chiefs 42–10. **Drive: 5 plays, 9 yards, 1:26.**

**Top passers**

- SDG – Moses Moreno – 11/22, 107 yards
- KAN – Elvis Grbac – 20/33, 235 yards, 5 TD, INT

**Top rushers**

- SDG – Moses Moreno – 4 rushes, 20 yards
- KAN – Frank Moreau – 18 rushes, 58 yards, TD

**Top receivers**

- SDG – Terrell Fletcher – 7 receptions, 66 yards
- KAN – Sylvester Morris – 6 receptions, 112 yards, 3 TD

==== Week 4: vs. Seattle Seahawks ====
Week Four: Seattle Seahawks at San Diego Chargers – Game summary

Quarter	1	2	3	4	Total
**Seahawks**	10	3	7	0	**20**
Chargers	6	6	0	0	**12**

at Qualcomm Stadium, San Diego, California

- Date: September 24
- Game time: 1:15 p.m. PDT
- Game weather: 72 °F (22 °C), relative humidity 52%, wind 9 mph
- Game attendance: 47,233
- Referee: Tony Corrente
- TV announcers (CBS): Bill Macatee and Daryl Johnston
- Box score

Game information

**First quarter**

- SEA – Kris Heppner 25-yard field goal, 10:05. Seahawks 3–0. **Drive: 11 plays, 58 yards, 4:55.**
- SDG – John Carney 41-yard field goal, 3:37. Tied 3–3. **Drive: 10 plays, 49 yards, 6:28.**
- SDG – John Carney 28-yard field goal, 1:04. Chargers 6–3. **Drive: 4 plays, 6 yards, 2:19.**
- SEA – Darrell Jackson 68-yard pass from Jon Kitna (Kris Heppner kick), 0:05. Seahawks 10–6. **Drive: 2 plays, 68 yards, 0:59.**

**Second quarter**

- SDG – John Carney 24-yard field goal, 3:56. Seahawks 10–9. **Drive: 6 plays, 27 yards, 2:41.**
- SEA – Kris Heppner 26-yard field goal, 0:36. Seahawks 13–9. **Drive: 11 plays, 65 yards, 3:20.**
- SDG – John Carney 45-yard field goal, 0:00. Seahawks 13–12. **Drive: 4 plays, 26 yards, 0:36.**

**Third quarter**

- SEA – Willie Williams 69-yard interception return (Kris Heppner kick), 6:50. Seahawks 20–12.

**Fourth quarter**

- No scoring plays.

**Top passers**

- SEA – Jon Kitna – 11/21, 196 yards, TD
- SDG – Ryan Leaf – 16/26, 153 yards, INT

**Top rushers**

- SEA – Ricky Watters – 16 rushes, 67 yards
- SDG – Terrell Fletcher – 5 rushes, 40 yards

**Top receivers**

- SEA – Darrell Jackson – 1 reception, 68 yards, TD
- SDG – Freddie Jones – 8 receptions, 82 yards

==== Week 5: at St.Louis Rams ====
Week Five: San Diego Chargers at St.Louis Rams – Game summary

Quarter	1	2	3	4	Total
Chargers	3	7	7	14	**31**
**Rams**	17	13	17	10	**57**

at Trans World Dome, St. Louis, Missouri

- Date: October 1
- Game time: 2:02 p.m. CDT
- Game weather: N/A (game played indoors)
- Game attendance: 66,010
- Referee: Bob McElwee
- TV announcers (CBS): Dick Enberg, Dan Dierdorf and Bonnie Bernstein
- Box score

Game information

**First quarter**

- STL – Jeff Wilkins 51-yard field goal, 12:28. Rams 3–0. **Drive: 6 plays, 42 yards, 2:32.**
- STL – Isaac Bruce 9-yard pass from Kurt Warner (Jeff Wilkins kick), 6:38. Rams 10–0. **Drive: 5 plays, 71 yards, 2:25.**
- STL – Marshall Faulk 13-yard pass from Kurt Warner (Jeff Wilkins kick), 5:44. Rams 17–0. **Drive: 2 plays, 29 yards, 0:38.**
- SDG – John Carney 37-yard field goal, 0:40. Rams 17–3. **Drive: 10 plays, 49 yards, 5:04.**

**Second quarter**

- STL – Jeff Wilkins 21-yard field goal, 11:59. Rams 20–3. **Drive: 8 plays, 71 yards, 3:41.**
- SDG – Jermaine Fazande 2-yard run (John Carney kick), 6:35. Rams 20–10. **Drive: 10 plays, 72 yards, 5:42.**
- STL – Torry Holt 7-yard pass from Kurt Warner (Jeff Wilkins kick), 2:41. Rams 27–10. **Drive: 8 plays, 83 yards, 3:54.**
- STL – Jeff Wilkins 31-yard field goal, 0:00. Rams 30–10. **Drive: 7 plays, 48 yards, 0:53.**

**Third quarter**

- SDG – Fred McCrary 3-yard pass from Jim Harbaugh (John Carney kick), 12:00. Rams 30–17. **Drive: 6 plays, 82 yards, 3:00.**
- STL – Isaac Bruce 12-yard pass from Kurt Warner (Jeff Wilkins kick), 10:57. Rams 37–17. **Drive: 2 plays, 63 yards, 1:03.**
- STL – Jeff Wilkins 33-yard field goal, 8:15. Rams 40–17. **Drive: 5 plays, 33 yards, 1:30.**
- STL – Marshall Faulk 48-yard pass from Trent Green (Jeff Wilkins kick), 4:00. Rams 47–17. **Drive: 4 plays, 65 yards, 1:37.**

**Fourth quarter**

- STL – Jeff Wilkins 20-yard field goal, 11:36. Rams 50–17. **Drive: 10 plays, 37 yards, 5:57.**
- SDG – Terrell Fletcher 6-yard run (John Carney kick), 7:42. Rams 50–24. **Drive: 9 plays, 77 yards, 3:54.**
- STL – Justin Watson 12-yard run (Jeff Wilkins kick), 3:19. Rams 57–24. **Drive: 7 plays, 80 yards, 4:23.**
- SDG – Trevor Gaylor 62-yard pass from Jim Harbaugh (John Carney kick), 1:52. Rams 57–31. **Drive: 3 plays, 71 yards, 1:27.**

**Top passers**

- SDG – Jim Harbaugh – 27/40, 348 yards, 2 TD, INT
- STL – Kurt Warner – 24/30, 390 yards, 4 TD

**Top rushers**

- SDG – Terrell Fletcher – 4 rushes, 23 yards, TD
- STL – Justin Watson – 14 rushes, 102 yards, TD

**Top receivers**

- SDG – Jeff Graham – 7 receptions, 107 yards
- STL – Isaac Bruce – 9 receptions, 167 yards, 2 TD

==== Week 6: vs. Denver Broncos ====
Week Nine: Denver Broncos at San Diego Chargers – Game summary

Quarter	1	2	3	4	Total
**Broncos**	7	0	7	7	**21**
Chargers	0	7	0	0	**7**

at Qualcomm Stadium, San Diego, California

- Date: October 8
- Game time: 2:15 p.m. MDT
- Game weather: 68 °F (20 °C), relative humidity 82%, wind 7 mph
- Game attendance: 56,079
- Referee: Ed Hochuli
- TV announcers (CBS): Gus Johnson and Brent Jones
- Box score

Game information

**First quarter**

- DEN – Ed McCaffrey 2-yard pass from Brian Griese (Jason Elam kick), 8:57. Broncos 7–0. **Drive: 6 plays, 24 yards, 3:08.**

**Second quarter**

- SDG – Freddie Jones 26-yard pass from Jim Harbaugh (John Carney kick), 0:52. Tied 7–7. **Drive: 9 plays, 88 yards, 2:40.**

**Third quarter**

- DEN – Ed McCaffrey 5-yard pass from Brian Griese (Jason Elam kick), 6:16. Broncos 14–7. **Drive: 4 plays, 24 yards, 1:56.**

**Fourth quarter**

- DEN – Dwayne Carswell 14-yard pass from Brian Griese (Jason Elam kick), 1:25. Broncos 21–7. **Drive: 2 plays, 14 yards, 0:13.**

**Top passers**

- DEN – Brian Griese – 27/40, 235 yards, 3 TD
- SDG – Jim Harbaugh – 18/43, 237 yards, TD, 3 INT

**Top rushers**

- DEN – Mike Anderson – 13 rushes, 52 yards
- SDG – Jermaine Fazande – 14 rushes, 61 yards

**Top receivers**

- DEN – Ed McCaffrey – 10 receptions, 71 yards, 2 TD
- SDG – Reggie Jones – 7 receptions, 101 yards

==== Week 7: at Buffalo Bills ====
Week Seven: San Diego Chargers at Buffalo Bills – Game summary

Quarter	1	2	3	4	OT	Total
Chargers	3	7	14	0	0	**24**
**Bills**	0	14	0	10	3	**27**

at Ralph Wilson Stadium, Buffalo, New York

- Date: October 15
- Game time: 1:01 p.m. EDT
- Game weather: 64 °F (17.8 °C), relative humidity 78%, wind 7 mph
- Game attendance: 72,351
- Referee: Bill Carollo
- TV announcers (CBS): Craig Bolerjack and Charles Mann
- Box score

Game information

**First quarter**

- SDG – John Carney 36-yard field goal, 0:13. Chargers 3–0. **Drive: 13 plays, 62 yards, 7:46.**

**Second quarter**

- BUF – Sammy Morris 32-yard run (Steve Christie kick), 14:05. Bills 7–3. **Drive: 1 play, 32 yards, 0:08.**
- BUF – Jerry Ostroski offensive fumble recovery in end zone (Steve Christie kick), 10:53. Bills 14–3. **Drive: 5 plays, 17 yards, 2:19.**
- SDG – Curtis Conway 60-yard pass from Jim Harbaugh (John Carney kick), 9:15. Bills 14–10. **Drive: 3 plays, 65 yards, 1:38.**

**Third quarter**

- SDG – Jermaine Fazande 2-yard run (John Carney kick), 10:30. Chargers 17–14. **Drive: 5 plays, 17 yards, 2:38.**
- SDG – Jeff Graham 52-yard pass from Jim Harbaugh (John Carney kick), 8:09. Chargers 24–14. **Drive: 2 plays, 52 yards, 0:49.**

**Fourth quarter**

- BUF – Shawn Bryson 11-yard pass from Rob Johnson (Steve Christie kick), 13:48. Chargers 24–21. **Drive: 11 plays, 99 yards, 5:11.**
- BUF – Steve Christie 29-yard field goal, 0:07. Tied 24–24. **Drive: 12 plays, 69 yards, 2:26.**

**Overtime**

- BUF – Steve Christie 46-yard field goal, 6:34. Bills 27–24. **Drive: 7 plays, 31 yards, 3:01.**

**Top passers**

- SDG – Jim Harbaugh – 21/33, 287 yards, 2 TD, 2 INT
- BUF – Rob Johnson – 29/47, 321 yards, TD, INT

**Top rushers**

- SDG – Jermaine Fazande – 9 rushes, 51 yards, TD
- BUF – Sammy Morris – 8 rushes, 60 yards, TD

**Top receivers**

- SDG – Curtis Conway – 7 receptions, 143 yards, TD
- BUF – Eric Moulds – 11 receptions, 170 yards

==== Week 9: vs. Oakland Raiders ====
Week Nine: Oakland Raiders at San Diego Chargers – Game summary

Quarter	1	2	3	4	Total
**Raiders**	9	3	0	3	**15**
Chargers	0	0	7	6	**13**

at Qualcomm Stadium, San Diego, California

- Date: October 29
- Game time: 5:25 p.m. PST
- Game weather: 63 °F (17 °C), relative humidity 82%, wind 8 mph
- Game attendance: 66,659
- Referee: Dick Hantak
- TV announcers (ESPN): Mike Patrick, Joe Theismann, Paul Maguire and Solomon Wilcots
- Box score

Game information

**First quarter**

- OAK – Sebastian Janikowski 40-yard field goal, 9:37. Raiders 3–0. **Drive: 13 plays, 44 yards, 5:23.**
- OAK – Sebastian Janikowski 40-yard field goal, 4:34. Raiders 6–0. **Drive: 9 plays, 62 yards, 2:56.**
- OAK – Sebastian Janikowski 54-yard field goal, 0:14. Raiders 9–0. **Drive: 6 plays, 30 yards, 2:42.**

**Second quarter**

- OAK – Sebastian Janikowski 29-yard field goal, 6:55. Raiders 12–0. **Drive: 9 plays, 37 yards, 5:32.**

**Third quarter**

- SDG – Freddie Jones 8-yard pass from Jim Harbaugh (John Carney kick), 8:51. Raiders 12–7. **Drive: 12 plays, 76 yards, 6:09.**

**Fourth quarter**

- SDG – Freddie Jones 21-yard pass from Jim Harbaugh (pass failed), 5:58. Chargers 13–12. **Drive: 6 plays, 37 yards, 3:22.**
- OAK – Sebastian Janikowski 24-yard field goal, 0:13. Raiders 15–13. **Drive: 13 plays, 58 yards, 5:45.**

**Top passers**

- OAK – Rich Gannon – 16/35, 156 yards, INT
- SDG – Jim Harbaugh – 25/35, 222 yards, 2 TD, INT

**Top rushers**

- OAK – Rich Gannon – 7 rushes, 27 yards
  OAK – Napoleon Kaufman – 6 rushes, 27 yards
- SDG – Terrell Fletcher – 9 rushes, 23 yards

**Top receivers**

- OAK – Andre Rison – 5 receptions, 67 yards
- SDG – Freddie Jones – 10 receptions, 111 yards, 2 TD

==== Week 10: at Seattle Seahawks ====
Week Ten: San Diego Chargers at Seattle Seahawks – Game summary

Quarter	1	2	3	4	Total
Chargers	0	3	9	3	**15**
**Seahawks**	0	14	0	3	**17**

at Husky Stadium, Seattle, Washington

- Date: November 5
- Game time: 1:15 p.m. PST
- Game weather: 48 °F (9 °C), relative humidity 100%, wind 8 mph
- Game attendance: 59,884
- Referee: Larry Nemmers
- TV announcers (CBS): Bill Macatee and Charles Mann
- Box score

Game information

**First quarter**

- No scoring plays.

**Second quarter**

- SEA – Sean Dawkins 10-yard pass from Jon Kitna (Rian Lindell kick), 12:57. Seahawks 7–0. **Drive: 5 plays, 21 yards, 1:59.**
- SEA – Christian Fauria 10-yard pass from Jon Kitna (Rian Lindell kick), 8:34. Seahawks 14–0. **Drive: 4 plays, 33 yards, 1:58.**
- SDG – John Carney 19-yard field goal, 0:00. Seahawks 14–3. **Drive: 7 plays, 30 yards, 1:59.**

**Third quarter**

- SDG – John Carney 41-yard field goal, 9:11. Seahawks 14–6. **Drive: 11 plays, 51 yards, 5:49.**
- SDG – Curtis Conway 10-yard pass from Jim Harbaugh (run failed), 4:12. Seahawks 14–12. **Drive: 8 plays, 44 yards, 4:40.**

**Fourth quarter**

- SDG – John Carney 28-yard field goal, 5:36. Chargers 15–14. **Drive: 14 plays, 73 yards, 9:12.**
- SEA – Rian Lindell 48-yard field goal, 0:00. Seahawks 17–15. **Drive: 16 plays, 36 yards, 5:36.**

**Top passers**

- SDG – Jim Harbaugh – 22/32, 236 yards, TD, INT
- SEA – Jon Kitna – 11/19, 85 yards, 2 TD, INT

**Top rushers**

- SDG – Jermaine Fazande – 22 rushes, 74 yards
- SEA – Ricky Watters – 21 rushes, 55 yards

**Top receivers**

- SDG – Freddie Jones – 5 receptions, 86 yards
- SEA – Darrell Jackson – 2 receptions, 27 yards

==== Week 11: vs. Miami Dolphins ====
Week Eleven: Miami Dolphins at San Diego Chargers – Game summary

Quarter	1	2	3	4	Total
**Dolphins**	7	7	3	0	**17**
Chargers	0	0	0	7	**7**

at Qualcomm Stadium, San Diego, California

- Date: November 12
- Game time: 4:05 p.m. EST
- Game weather: 63 °F (17 °C), relative humidity 69%, wind 7 mph
- Game attendance: 56,896
- Referee: Tony Corrente
- TV announcers (CBS): Gus Johnson and Brent Jones
- Box score

Game information

**First quarter**

- MIA – Lamar Smith 2-yard run (Olindo Mare kick), 13:19. Dolphins 7–0. **Drive: 3 plays, 67 yards, 1:01.**

**Second quarter**

- MIA – Lamar Smith 6-yard run (Olindo Mare kick), 14:16. Dolphins 14–0. **Drive: 11 plays, 66 yards, 6:21.**

**Third quarter**

- MIA – Olindo Mare 35-yard field goal, 6:29. Dolphins 17–0. **Drive: 7 plays, 49 yards, 3:05.**

**Fourth quarter**

- SDG – Fred McCrary 8-yard pass from Ryan Leaf (John Carney kick), 14:55. Dolphins 17–7. **Drive: 11 plays, 65 yards, 6:34.**

**Top passers**

- MIA – Jay Fiedler – 13/20, 160 yards
- SDG – Ryan Leaf – 9/21, 92 yards, TD, INT

**Top rushers**

- MIA – Lamar Smith – 27 rushes, 69 yards, 2 TD
- SDG – Terrell Fletcher – 10 rushes, 52 yards

**Top receivers**

- MIA – Oronde Gadsden – 1 reception, 61 yards
- SDG – Trevor Gaylor – 3 receptions, 53 yards

==== Week 12: at Denver Broncos ====
Week Twelve: San Diego Chargers at Denver Broncos – Game summary

Quarter	1	2	3	4	Total
Chargers	3	21	10	3	**37**
**Broncos**	0	10	7	21	**38**

at Mile High Stadium, Denver, Colorado

- Date: November 19
- Game time: 2:05 p.m. MST
- Game weather: 39 °F (4 °C), relative humidity 49%, wind 13 mph, wind chill 23
- Game attendance: 75,218
- Referee: Johnny Grier
- TV announcers (CBS): Don Criqui and Steve Tasker
- Box score

Game information

**First quarter**

- SDG – John Carney 41-yard field goal, 4:41. Chargers 3–0. **Drive: 9 plays, 19 yards, 3:16.**

**Second quarter**

- DEN – Ed McCaffrey 1-yard pass from Gus Frerotte (Jason Elam kick), 14:47. Broncos 7–3. **Drive: 9 plays, 60 yards, 4:54.**
- SDG – Curtis Conway 68-yard pass from Ryan Leaf (John Carney kick), 13:06. Chargers 10–7. **Drive: 3 plays, 80 yards, 1:41.**
- SDG – Jeff Graham 45-yard pass from Ryan Leaf (John Carney kick), 3:15. Chargers 17–7. **Drive: 5 plays, 78 yards, 2:40.**
- SDG – Scott Turner 75-yard interception return (John Carney kick), 1:25. Chargers 24–7.
- DEN – Jason Elam 26-yard field goal, 8:57. Chargers 24–10. **Drive: 10 plays, 63 yards, 1:01.**

**Third quarter**

- SDG – John Carney 31-yard field goal, 11:25. Chargers 27–10. **Drive: 4 plays, 7 yards, 1:18.**
- DEN – Dwayne Carswell 5-yard pass from Gus Frerotte (Jason Elam kick), 5:08. Chargers 27–17. **Drive: 4 plays, 26 yards, 2:07.**
- SDG – Jeff Graham 83-yard pass from Ryan Leaf (John Carney kick), 0:08. Chargers 34–17. **Drive: 2 plays, 80 yards, 0:51.**

**Fourth quarter**

- DEN – Rod Smith 26-yard pass from Gus Frerotte (Jason Elam kick), 13:00. Chargers 34–24. **Drive: 6 plays, 65 yards, 2:08.**
- SDG – John Carney 33-yard field goal, 7:13. Chargers 37–24. **Drive: 7 plays, 27 yards, 3:28.**
- DEN – Desmond Clark 10-yard pass from Gus Frerotte (Jason Elam kick), 4:59. Chargers 37–31. **Drive: 5 plays, 66 yards, 2:14.**
- DEN – Ed McCaffrey 5-yard pass from Gus Frerotte (Jason Elam kick), 1:33. Broncos 38–37. **Drive: 6 plays, 45 yards, 2:11.**

**Top passers**

- DEN – Gus Frerotte – 36/58, 462 yards, 5 TD, 4 INT
- SDG – Ryan Leaf – 13/27, 311 yards, 3 TD, INT

**Top rushers**

- DEN – Mike Anderson – 19 rushes, 97 yards
- SDG – Jermaine Fazande – 14 rushes, 49 yards

**Top receivers**

- DEN – Ed McCaffrey – 11 receptions, 187 yards, TD
- SDG – Jeff Graham – 4 receptions, 144 yards, 2 TD

==== Week 13: vs. Kansas City Chiefs ====
Week Thirteen: Kansas City Chiefs at San Diego Chargers – Game summary

Quarter	1	2	3	4	Total
Chiefs	3	3	10	0	**16**
**Chargers**	7	7	0	3	**17**

at Qualcomm Stadium, San Diego, California

- Date: November 26
- Game time: 1:15 p.m. PST
- Game weather: 69 °F (20.6 °C), relative humidity 66%, wind 8 mph
- Game attendance: 47,228
- Referee: Bernie Kukar
- TV announcers (CBS): Ian Eagle and Mark May
- Box score

Game information

**First quarter**

- KAN – Todd Peterson 39-yard field goal, 6:34. Chiefs 3–0. **Drive: 4 plays, 2 yards, 0:36.**
- SDG – Freddie Jones 20-yard pass from Ryan Leaf (John Carney kick), 4:23. Chargers 7–3. **Drive: 5 plays, 68 yards, 2:11.**

**Second quarter**

- SDG – Freddie Jones 7-yard pass from Ryan Leaf (John Carney kick), 13:12. Chargers 14–3. **Drive: 8 plays, 80 yards, 4:40.**
- KAN – Todd Peterson 34-yard field goal, 4:32. Chargers 10–7. **Drive: 7 plays, 8 yards, 3:32.**

**Third quarter**

- KAN – Marvcus Patton 24-yard interception return (Todd Peterson kick), 13:58. Chargers 14–13.
- KAN – Todd Peterson 30-yard field goal, 1:51. Chiefs 16–14. **Drive: 6 plays, 39 yards, 2:40.**

**Fourth quarter**

- SDG – John Carney 52-yard field goal, 2:14. Chargers 17–16. **Drive: 4 plays, 3 yards, 1:24.**

**Top passers**

- KAN – Warren Moon – 12/31, 130 yards, INT
- SDG – Ryan Leaf – 17/30, 177 yards, 2 TD, 2 INT

**Top rushers**

- KAN – Tony Richardson – 9 rushes, 52 yards
- SDG – Terrell Fletcher – 14 rushes, 40 yards

**Top receivers**

- KAN – Derrick Alexander – 4 receptions, 67 yards
- SDG – Jeff Graham – 3 receptions, 48 yards

==== Week 14: vs. San Francisco 49ers ====
Week Fourteen: San Francisco 49ers at San Diego Chargers – Game summary

Quarter	1	2	3	4	Total
**49ers**	0	17	10	18	**45**
Chargers	7	3	0	7	**17**

at Qualcomm Stadium, San Diego, California

- Date: December 3
- Game time: 1:05 p.m. PST
- Game weather: 66 °F (18.9 °C), relative humidity 71%, wind 9 mph
- Game attendance: 57,255
- Referee: Gerry Austin
- TV announcers (FOX): Kenny Albert and Tim Green
- Box score

Game information

**First quarter**

- SDG – Terrell Fletcher 7-yard run (John Carney kick), 5:43. Chargers 7–0. **Drive: 8 plays, 51 yards, 4:41.**

**Second quarter**

- SF – Wade Richey 22-yard field goal, 12:31. Chargers 7–3. **Drive: 6 plays, 43 yards, 2:17.**
- SF – Fred Beasley 1-yard run (Wade Richey kick), 6:04. 49ers 10–7. **Drive: 9 plays, 83 yards, 4:22.**
- SF – Jerry Rice 1-yard pass from Jeff Garcia (Wade Richey kick), 1:10. 49ers 17–7. **Drive: 6 plays, 74 yards, 2:23.**
- SDG – John Carney 34-yard field goal, 0:06. 49ers 17–10. **Drive: 6 plays, 40 yards, 1:04.**

**Third quarter**

- SF – Wade Richey 28-yard field goal, 6:31. 49ers 20–10. **Drive: 8 plays, 75 yards, 3:46.**
- SF – Charlie Garner 4-yard run (Wade Richey kick), 2:56. 49ers 27–10. **Drive: 5 plays, 15 yards, 1:24.**

**Fourth quarter**

- SDG – Curtis Conway 17-yard pass from Ryan Leaf (John Carney kick), 12:47. 49ers 27–17. **Drive: 5 plays, 61 yards, 1:58.**
- SF – Wade Richey 38-yard field goal, 9:23. 49ers 30–17. **Drive: 6 plays, 49 yards, 3:24.**
- SF – Jerry Rice 12-yard pass from Jeff Garcia (J. J. Stokes pass from Jeff Garcia), 8:44. 49ers 38–17. **Drive: 1 play, 12 yards, 0:06.**
- SF – Monty Montgomery 46-yard interception return (Wade Richey kick), 1:39. 49ers 45–17.

**Top passers**

- SF – Jeff Garcia – 18/32, 323 yards, 2 TD
- SDG – Ryan Leaf – 24/47, 266 yards, TD, 4 INT

**Top rushers**

- SF – Charlie Garner – 13 rushes, 28 yards, TD
- SDG – Terrell Fletcher – 12 rushes, 47 yards, TD

**Top receivers**

- SF – Terrell Owens – 4 receptions, 93 yards
- SDG – Curtis Conway – 7 receptions, 88 yards, TD

==== Week 15: at Baltimore Ravens ====
Week Fifteen: San Diego Chargers at Baltimore Ravens – Game summary

Quarter	1	2	3	4	Total
Chargers	0	3	0	0	**3**
**Ravens**	3	7	14	0	**24**

at PSINet Stadium, Baltimore, Maryland

- Date: December 10
- Game time: 1:02 p.m. EST
- Game weather: 39 °F (4 °C), relative humidity 62%, wind 2 mph
- Game attendance: 68,805
- Referee: Tom White
- TV announcers (CBS): Gus Johnson and Brent Jones
- Box score

Game information

**First quarter**

- BAL – Matt Stover 32-yard field goal, 3:35. Ravens 3–0. **Drive: 9 plays, 19 yards, 3:16.** Drive: 17 plays, 60 yards, 9:09.

**Second quarter**

- BAL – Qadry Ismail 28-yard pass from Trent Dilfer (Matt Stover kick), 4:16. Ravens 10–0. **Drive: 6 plays, 46 yards, 3:55.**
- SDG – John Carney 47-yard field goal, 0:48. Ravens 10–3. **Drive: 7 plays, 14 yards, 1:31.**

**Third quarter**

- BAL – Jamal Lewis 1-yard run (Matt Stover kick), 10:47. Ravens 17–3. **Drive: 2 plays, 3 yards, 0:42.**
- BAL – Brandon Stokley 22-yard pass from Trent Dilfer (Matt Stover kick), 4:51. Ravens 24–3. **Drive: 3 plays, 17 yards, 1:54.**

**Fourth quarter**

- No scoring plays.

**Top passers**

- SDG – Ryan Leaf – 9/23, 78 yards, INT
- BAL – Trent Dilfer – 16/24, 187 yards, 2 TD, 2 INT

**Top rushers**

- SDG – Terrell Fletcher – 16 rushes, 44 yards
- BAL – Jamal Lewis – 29 rushes, 91 yards, TD

**Top receivers**

- SDG – Curtis Conway – 3 receptions, 32 yards
- BAL – Qadry Ismail – 6 receptions, 80 yards, TD

==== Week 16: at Carolina Panthers ====
Week Fifteen: San Diego Chargers at Carolina Panthers – Game summary

Quarter	1	2	3	4	Total
Chargers	2	14	6	0	**22**
**Panthers**	7	0	13	10	**30**

at Ericsson Stadium, Charlotte, North Carolina

- Date: December 17
- Game time: 1:04 p.m. EST
- Game weather: 36 °F (2.2 °C), relative humidity 67%, wind 15 mph, wind chill 12
- Game attendance: 72,159
- Referee: Bill Carollo
- TV announcers (CBS): Craig Bolerjack and Charles Mann
- Box score

Game information

**First quarter**

- CAR – Muhsin Muhammad 11-yard pass from Steve Beuerlein (Joe Nedney kick), 9:25. Panthers 7–0. **Drive: 11 plays, 69 yards, 5:35.**
- SDG – Safety, Albert Fontenot and John Parrella sacked Steve Beuerlein in end zone, 1:32. Panthers 7–2.

**Second quarter**

- SDG – Terrell Fletcher 25-yard pass from Ryan Leaf (John Carney kick), 12:45. Chargers 9–7. **Drive: 9 plays, 74 yards, 3:47.**
- SDG – Gerald Dixon 36-yard interception return (John Carney kick), 7:18. Chargers 16–7.

**Third quarter**

- CAR – Isaac Byrd 34-yard pass from Steve Beuerlein (Joe Nedney kick), 12:46. Chargers 16–14. **Drive: 3 plays, 35 yards, 0:51.**
- SDG – Steve Heiden 4-yard pass from Ryan Leaf (run failed), 7:58. Chargers 22–14. **Drive: 6 plays, 61 yards, 2:40.**
- CAR – Iheanyi Uwaezuoke 64-yard punt return (pass failed), 1:52. Chargers 22–20.

**Fourth quarter**

- CAR – Joe Nedney 18-yard field goal, 13:40. Panthers 23–22. **Drive: 5 plays, 35 yards, 2:12.**
- CAR – Doug Evans 54-yard blocked field goal return (Joe Nedney kick), 9:33. Panthers 30–22.

**Top passers**

- SDG – Ryan Leaf – 23/43, 259 yards, 2 TD, INT
- CAR – Steve Beuerlein – 12/27, 139 yards, 2 TD

**Top rushers**

- SDG – Terrell Fletcher – 16 rushes, 47 yards
- CAR – Muhsin Muhammad – 1 rush, 8 yards

**Top receivers**

- SDG – Terrell Fletcher – 7 receptions, 66 yards, TD
- CAR – Muhsin Muhammad – 9 receptions, 72 yards, TD

==== Week 17: vs. Pittsburgh Steelers ====
Week Seventeen: Pittsburgh Steelers at San Diego Chargers – Game summary

Quarter	1	2	3	4	Total
**Steelers**	7	17	0	10	**34**
Chargers	14	0	7	0	**21**

at Qualcomm Stadium, San Diego, California

- Date: December 24
- Game time: 1:05 p.m. PST
- Game weather: 62 °F (16.7 °C), relative humidity 63%, wind 8 mph
- Game attendance: 50,809
- Referee: Bob McElwee
- TV announcers (CBS): Gus Johnson and Brent Jones
- Box score

Game information

**First quarter**

- SDG – Jeff Graham 71-yard pass from Ryan Leaf (John Carney kick), 13:02. Chargers 7–0. **Drive: 1 play, 71 yards, 0:12.**
- PIT – Will Blackwell 98-yard kickoff return (Kris Brown kick), 12:41. Tied 7–7.
- SDG – Rodney Harrison 63-yard interception return (John Carney kick), 10:20. Chargers 14–7.

**Second quarter**

- PIT – Courtney Hawkins 5-yard pass from Kordell Stewart (Kris Brown kick), 8:43. Tied 14–14. **Drive: 7 plays, 52 yards, 3:51.**
- PIT – Kris Brown 32-yard field goal, 2:14. Steelers 17–14. **Drive: 10 plays, 59 yards, 4:43.**
- PIT – Kordell Stewart 19-yard run (Kris Brown kick), 0:55. Steelers 24–14. **Drive: 3 plays, 48 yards, 0:45.**

**Third quarter**

- SDG – Terrell Fletcher 1-yard run (John Carney kick), 4:45. Steelers 24–21. **Drive: 4 plays, 13 yards, 2:28.**

**Fourth quarter**

- PIT – Kordell Stewart 1-yard run (Kris Brown kick), 12:51. Steelers 31–21. **Drive: 13 plays, 77 yards, 6:54.**
- PIT – Kris Brown 28-yard field goal, 4:07. Steelers 34–21. **Drive: 15 plays, 70 yards, 7:47.**

**Top passers**

- PIT – Kordell Stewart – 16/32, 190 yards, TD, 2 INT
- SDG – Ryan Leaf – 15/29, 171 yards, TD, INT

**Top rushers**

- PIT – Kordell Stewart – 10 rushes, 81 yards, 2 TD
- SDG – Terrell Fletcher – 11 rushes, 25 yards, TD

**Top receivers**

- PIT – Courtney Hawkins – 5 receptions, 71 yards, TD
- SDG – Jeff Graham – 5 receptions, 113 yards, TD

== Standings ==
AFC West
	W	L	T	PCT	PF	PA	STK
^{(2)} Oakland Raiders	12	4	0	.750	479	299	W1
^{(5)} Denver Broncos	11	5	0	.688	485	369	W1
Kansas City Chiefs	7	9	0	.438	355	354	L1
Seattle Seahawks	6	10	0	.375	320	405	L1
San Diego Chargers	1	15	0	.063	269	440	L4

== Awards ==
Seau and Bennett were the only Chargers in the AFC Pro Bowl squad, both qualifying as starters; Seau was also named first-team All-Pro by the Associated Press.
