= Ryan Leaf =

American football player, analyst, and motivational speaker

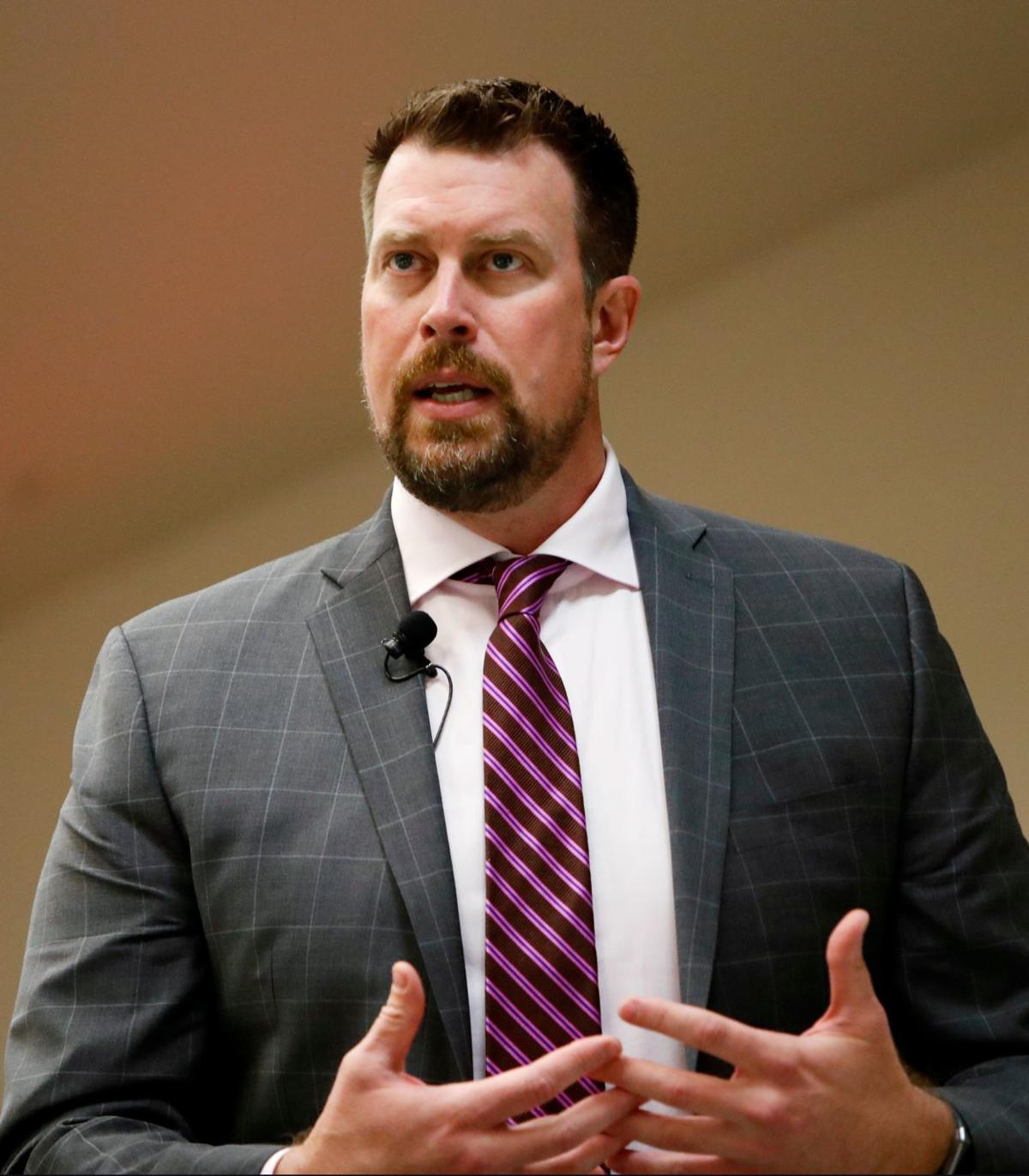
- Leaf in 2018

No. 16
- Position: Quarterback

Personal information
- Born: May 15, 1976 (age 50); Great Falls, Montana, U.S.
- Listed height: 6 ft 5 in (1.96 m)
- Listed weight: 235 lb (107 kg)

Career information
- High school: Charles M. Russell (Great Falls)
- College: Washington State (1995–1997)
- NFL draft: 1998: 1st round, 2nd overall pick

Career history

Playing
- San Diego Chargers (1998–2000); Tampa Bay Buccaneers (2001)*; Dallas Cowboys (2001); Seattle Seahawks (2002)*
- * Offseason or practice squad member only

Coaching
- West Texas A&M (2006–2008) Quarterbacks coach

Awards and highlights
- First-team All-American (1997); Pac-10 Offensive Player of the Year (1997); First-team All-Pac-10 (1997); Sammy Baugh Trophy (1997)

Career NFL statistics
- Passing attempts: 655
- Passing completions: 317
- Completion percentage: 48.4%
- TD–INT: 14–36
- Passing yards: 3,666
- Passer rating: 50.0
- Stats at Pro Football Reference

Ryan David Leaf (born May 15, 1976) is an American former professional football player who was a quarterback for four seasons in the National Football League (NFL). He played for the San Diego Chargers and the Dallas Cowboys between 1998 and 2001.

Leaf played college football with the Washington State Cougars, finishing as a finalist for the Heisman Trophy after his junior year. He was selected as the second overall pick by the Chargers in the 1998 NFL draft after Peyton Manning, but his career was shortened due to poor play, bad behavior, injuries, and struggles with his work ethic. He was released by the Chargers after three seasons, compiling a 4–14 record as the team's starting quarterback and notably missing the entire 1999 season due to injury. After an offseason stint with the Tampa Bay Buccaneers, Leaf played in four regular season games with the Dallas Cowboys in 2001. He signed with the Seattle Seahawks during the 2002 offseason, but abruptly retired before the season began.

After his NFL career ended, Leaf completed his degree at Washington State. He had legal troubles involving drugs beginning in 2010 when a Texas judge sentenced him to 10 years’ probation. From 2012 to 2014, Leaf served time in Montana state prison after pleading guilty to felony burglary and drug possession, a sentence that simultaneously counted towards time served for a probation violation in Texas. In 2020, he pled guilty to a misdemeanor domestic violence charge in California and was sentenced to probation.

Leaf has worked as a Program Ambassador for Transcend Recovery Community, a group of sober living houses in Los Angeles, Houston, and New York. He also hosts a radio show and works as a college football analyst on television.

== Early life ==
Ryan David Leaf was born on May 15, 1976, in Great Falls, Montana. He grew up admiring Terry Bradshaw and the Pittsburgh Steelers, and played high school football at Charles M. Russell High School in Great Falls, where he led the team to a state championship as a junior.

== College career ==
After leading Charles M. Russell High School to the 1992 Montana state title, he was told that his build and athleticism was good for a tight end, or maybe a linebacker by the head coach of the time, Dennis Erickson, at the University of Miami. He chose to be a quarterback for the Washington State Cougars instead after head coach Mike Price, who had coached longtime New England Patriots starting quarterback Drew Bledsoe, called him on the phone while Leaf was watching the Rose Bowl, and told him "If you come here, we're going there". Leaf did not know that Washington State had not reached the Rose Bowl since 1931, but later told Sports Illustrated that he immediately knew he wanted to accept a scholarship and play for Price.

Leaf played in 32 games for Washington State, starting 24 of them. In his junior year, he averaged 330.6 yards passing per game and threw for a then Pacific-10 Conference (Pac-10) record 33 touchdowns. He also led the Cougars to their first Pac-10 championship in school history. Despite his strong early showing in the 1998 Rose Bowl, Washington State was defeated 21–16 by the eventual Associated Press national champion Michigan Wolverines.

Leaf was a finalist in balloting for the Heisman Trophy that year, which is given annually to the "most outstanding" player in American college football voted in by media figures and former players. He finished third behind the winner, defensive back Charles Woodson of Michigan, and fellow quarterback Peyton Manning of Tennessee. He was named Pac-10 Offensive Player of the Year and was part of the All-Conference team. Leaf was also named first-team All-America by The Sporting News while finishing second in the nation in passer rating. The Rose Bowl helped make him a possible first overall selection in the NFL draft, and Leaf decided to forgo his senior year at Washington State and enter the 1998 draft.

== Professional career ==
Pre-draft measurables
Height	Weight	Arm length	Hand span	Wonderlic
6 ft 5 3/8 in (1.97 m)	261 lb (118 kg)	33 7/8 in (0.86 m)	10 1/2 in (0.27 m)	27
All values from NFL Combine

=== 1998 NFL draft ===
Peyton Manning and Leaf were widely considered to be the two best players available in the 1998 NFL draft, and scouts and analysts debated who should be selected first. Tampa Bay Buccaneers coach Tony Dungy recalled that although his team did not need a quarterback, "Manning-Leaf was really split when you talked to people". Many, including 14 of 20 NFL coaches and executives in a survey, favored Leaf's stronger arm and greater potential. Others preferred Manning as the more mature player and safer pick. Most observers believed that it would not greatly matter whether Manning or Leaf was drafted first because either would greatly benefit his team.

The Indianapolis Colts owned the first draft pick that year. Team scouts favored Leaf, but Colts president Bill Polian and coaching staff preferred Manning, especially after discovering during individual workouts that he could throw harder than Leaf. Manning also impressed the team during his interview, while Leaf missed his with Colts head coach Jim E. Mora. Leaf had missed this meeting due to receiving an MRI, but his absence upset Mora, and as a result no members of the Colts organization came to Leaf's pro day he later held at Martin Stadium. Leaf's draft prospect profile described the player as "self-confident to the point where some people view him as being arrogant and almost obnoxious". Leaf gained about 20 pounds between the end of his junior season and the NFL Combine in February, which Jerry Angelo, one of six experts Sports Illustrated consulted on the choice, described as "a [negative] signal" about his self-discipline. All six believed that Manning was the better choice, but the magazine concluded "What does seem reasonably certain is that ... both Manning and Leaf should develop into at least good NFL starters".

The San Diego Chargers had the third overall pick. Polian told Chargers general manager Bobby Beathard that he would not trade the Colts' pick. Beathard later said that he would have taken Manning with the first pick because he knew his father Archie Manning, "but that didn't mean there was anything bad that way with Ryan at the time". His team needed a new quarterback after having scored the fewest touchdowns in the league in the previous season. To obtain the second draft pick from the Arizona Cardinals, San Diego traded that year's first- and second-round picks, their next year's first-round pick, linebacker Patrick Sapp, and three-time Pro Bowler wideout returnman Eric Metcalf, guaranteeing the right to draft whichever of the two quarterbacks Indianapolis did not take first.

Ultimately, Manning was drafted first by the Colts and Leaf second by the Chargers, who signed him to a four-year contract worth $31.25 million, including a guaranteed $11.25 million signing bonus, the largest ever paid to a rookie at the time. After being drafted, Leaf would say, "I'm looking forward to a 15-year career, a couple of trips to the Super Bowl, and a parade through downtown San Diego." The night after the draft, Leaf flew to Las Vegas, Nevada on the jet of Chargers owner Alex Spanos and partied all night; the following day Leaf yawned during his first news conference.

=== San Diego Chargers ===
==== 1998 season ====
San Diego's high hopes for Leaf were soon dashed as his rookie season was marred by poor behavior, starting with his skipping the final day of a symposium mandatory for all NFL draftees and incurring a $10,000 fine. Leaf nonetheless did well in the preseason and at the start of the regular season, as the Chargers won their first two games. They won their season opener on September 6 over the Buffalo Bills 16–14 despite mistakes from Leaf, such as fumbling his first snap and throwing two interceptions; Buffalo penalties voided two would-be interceptions. Leaf completed 16 of 31 passes for 192 yards in the opener and 13 of 24 passes for 179 yards (with 31 rushing yards in 7 carries) in the second game, a 13–7 victory over the Tennessee Oilers.

Three days before the Chargers' September 20 game against the Kansas City Chiefs, Leaf was hospitalized for a viral infection that he attributed to an improperly cleaned artificial-turf burn. In the game, he completed one of 15 passes for four yards and committed five turnovers (two interceptions and three lost fumbles) in a 23–7 loss. The next day, Leaf was caught on camera shouting at San Diego Union-Tribune reporter Jay Posner during a locker-room interview and was led away by Junior Seau and a team executive. He later apologized to Posner for the incident.

After Leaf had four first-half passes intercepted by the New York Giants in Week 4 (September 28), head coach Kevin Gilbride benched him in favor of former sixth-round pick Craig Whelihan. He started the following game on October 4, a 17–12 loss to the Indianapolis Colts and top pick Peyton Manning. Both quarterbacks completed 12 of 23 passes and threw one interception, with Leaf having 23 more passing yards (160) than Manning. However, Manning threw the game's only touchdown and was never sacked, while Leaf was downed four times. Inside the final two minutes and with San Diego down 14–6, Leaf's 56-yard pass to Charlie Jones set up a one-yard Natrone Means touchdown run, but Leaf's potential tying two-point conversion pass to Webster Slaughter was incomplete.

During the Chargers’ bye week, Leaf again found himself in the headlines after visiting Pullman, Washington, where he had played college football at Washington State. Initially returning to Pullman to make a charitable donation and appearance, Leaf would be banned from a college bar for splashing a group of students with a pitcher of beer, and was subsequently banned from another bar and convenience store that he visited later that night. News of the incident reached San Diego, and the organization seriously took Leaf's behavior into consideration. The next week, Leaf permanently lost his starting job to Whelihan following a 4-of-15, 23-yard performance with an interception against the Denver Broncos on November 8. Leaf finished the season with 111 completions on 245 attempts (45% completion percentage) with 1,289 passing yards in ten games and only two touchdowns against fifteen interceptions, earning him an abysmal passer rating of 39.0, the lowest passer rating by a qualified quarterback since Gary Marangi posted a 30.9 rating in 1976.

Leaf related poorly to both the media and his teammates, whom he tended to blame for his poor play, and developed a reputation for a poor work ethic, such as playing golf while other quarterbacks were studying film. His poor play particularly frustrated the members of the Chargers defense, who led the league in efficiency that year yet had to be paired with an inefficient offense. Beathard said, "Guys can be jerks, but I've never seen a guy that worked harder at alienating his teammates. Junior Seau, Rodney Harrison, they came to me and said, 'Bobby, this guy is killing me.'" Harrison described the 1998 season as "a nightmare" due to Leaf's immaturity and Whelihan's inefficiency: "If I had to go through another year like that, I'd probably quit playing." During the offseason, the team's defensive veterans called on management to sign a veteran quarterback and demote Leaf to backup, claiming his shortcomings undercut their league-leading performance. Seau, for instance, urged management to "get a guy in here not to babysit, but to win" and give Leaf time to develop.

==== 1999 season ====
Leaf suffered an injury to his throwing shoulder 20 minutes into the Chargers' opening training camp workout on July 23, 1999. One month later, a fan heckled Leaf by singing lyrics from the Little River Band song "Lonesome Loser" and comparing him to failed NFL quarterback Heath Shuler. Leaf, accompanied by a coach and security guards, went to confront the fan but was restrained by two coaches, with another Chargers employee saying, "No, don't do it, Ryan. Don't do it." Leaf later explained the incident: "...what I wanted to do was say, 'Hey, look, I've grown up, I'm calm about it, I would like to understand why you would say that about me.'"

Leaf underwent surgery to fix a labral tear in his shoulder and missed the 1999 season. He was placed on injured reserve but made headlines in early November when he got into a shouting match with Beathard and a coach, resulting in a fine, a suspension without pay, and an apology from Leaf four weeks later. During his suspension, he was caught on video playing flag football at a San Diego park, a violation of his contract according to team management. A sportswriter who covered Leaf during this period would later reveal that the quarterback privately told him that after losing the respect of his teammates and fans during his rookie year, and dealing with shoulder surgery and suspension during his second, he was already considering retirement after only two seasons in the NFL.

==== 2000 season ====
In the final game of the 2000 preseason, Leaf completed a pass to Trevor Gaylor to seal a 24–20 win over the Arizona Cardinals. After the game, he appeared on the cover of the September 4, 2000, issue of Sports Illustrated along with headline "Back from the Brink". The cover story characterized his comeback as "an ascent from pariah to possible standout pro passer". He started the first two games of the 2000 season but completed less than half of his pass attempts and threw five interceptions against only one touchdown. In the season opener on September 3, a 9–6 loss to the Oakland Raiders, Leaf completed 17 of 39 passes for 180 yards and three picks, including one on a 4th-and-inches play with 1:37 left that sealed the Raiders' victory. He suffered swelling in his left hand in addition to a chin gash that required stitches following a late hit from Raiders defensive tackle Regan Upshaw. The following game, a 28–27 loss to the New Orleans Saints, Leaf completed 12 of 24 passes for 134 yards and threw his first touchdown pass since his rookie season, a 20-yarder to Curtis Conway, but also threw two interceptions, one of which again cost the Chargers at the end of the game.

Head coach Mike Riley planned to start backup Moses Moreno in Week 3, but Leaf started after Moreno suffered a shoulder injury. The following week, Leaf suffered a sprained wrist that caused him to miss the next five games. In October, he publicly speculated that the Chargers would release him after the season, and later that month, reports suggested that Leaf had lied about his wrist injury to get out of practice and play golf instead.

In the Week 11 game on November 12 against the Miami Dolphins, Leaf replaced Moreno mid-game. Leaf threw an interception on his fourth snap, led a touchdown drive in the Chargers' next series, and left the game with nearly a minute to go after straining a hamstring on a scramble. This game was the first since 1993 where three quarterbacks on the same team – in this case Leaf, Moreno, and Jim Harbaugh – each threw an interception in one game. On November 19 against the Denver Broncos, Leaf completed 13 of 27 passes and reached career single-game highs in quarterback rating (111.8), passing yards (311), and passing touchdowns (3), but the Chargers lost the game 38–37. After an 0–11 start, the Chargers got their first win on November 26, 17–16 over the Kansas City Chiefs. The Chargers took a 14–3 lead early in the second quarter after Leaf threw two touchdowns to Freddie Jones, but the offense struggled late in the game on the back of two interceptions, one of which was returned for a touchdown.

Leaf would again play poorly with four more picks against the San Francisco 49ers on December 3, and with only 9 of 23 passes completed on December 10 in a loss to the Baltimore Ravens. He rebounded with 23 of 43 passes for 259 yards, two touchdowns and one interception in a December 17 loss to the Carolina Panthers 30–22. In the Chargers' final drive, with nearly two minutes remaining in the game, Leaf completed a 10-yard pass to Curtis Conway that was ruled six inches short of the end zone. On first down, however, miscommunication between Leaf and running back Jermaine Fazande resulted in a fumble and 8-yard loss, and the next two plays followed by a penalty forced a fourth down and goal 10 yards from the end zone, and Leaf's fourth-down pass was incomplete. On the final game of the season on December 24, Leaf made a 71-yard touchdown pass to Jeff Graham on the first play from scrimmage, but San Diego lost to the Pittsburgh Steelers 34–21. In the game, Leaf completed 15 of 29 passes for 171 yards, 1 touchdown, and 1 interception, and a fumble of his final snap. For the 2000 season, Leaf completed 50% (161 of 322) of his passes for 1,883 yards, 11 touchdowns, and 18 interceptions.

After finishing the season with a disastrous 1–15 record, the Chargers released Leaf on February 28, 2001. In three seasons with the Chargers, he won only four of 18 games as a starter, and threw a total of 13 touchdowns and 33 interceptions.

=== Tampa Bay Buccaneers ===
On March 2, 2001, two days after the Chargers released him, Leaf was claimed by the Tampa Bay Buccaneers, who were intrigued by his physical talent and planned to develop him more slowly, giving him time to watch and learn. Leaf's wrist had still not healed, and doctors recommended surgery. After mediocre preseason performances, he was asked to accept demotion to fourth quarterback status on the team and accept a lower salary. He refused, and was released on September 3, five days before the start of the 2001 season.

=== Dallas Cowboys ===
Leaf's next attempt at a comeback was with the Dallas Cowboys, who signed him after the Buccaneers released him, but he failed his first physical and was let go on September 5. After regular starter Quincy Carter suffered an injury, the Cowboys signed Leaf again on October 12. The Cowboys released him in May 2002 after he had appeared in only four games – all losses – throwing for a four-game total of 494 yards with only one touchdown and three interceptions.

=== Seattle Seahawks and retirement ===
Days later, Leaf got still another chance when the Seattle Seahawks signed him to a one-year contract, planning to let him develop slowly (as the Buccaneers had done) to allow his still-injured wrist time to heal. He attended the team's spring minicamps and seemed upbeat about his new team, but then abruptly retired at the age of 26 just before the start of the Seahawks' 2002 training camp, offering no explanation at first. Seahawks head coach and general manager Mike Holmgren told the media Leaf's wrist did not bother him with either the Cowboys or the Seahawks.

=== Legacy ===
During his brief career in the NFL, Leaf appeared in 25 games and made 21 starts. He completed 317 of 655 (48.4%) passes for 3,666 yards, with 14 touchdowns and 36 interceptions and a career quarterback rating of 50.0. Rodney Harrison, one of Leaf's most outspoken critics on the Chargers, said of his retirement, "He took the money and ran. Personally, I could never rest good at night knowing my career ended like that. Normally in this game, you get back what you put into it, and he pretty much got back what he put into it".

ESPN put Leaf first on its list of 25 biggest sports flops between 1979 and 2004. NBC Sports commentator Michael Ventre called him "the biggest bust in the history of professional sports". Since Leaf's retirement, sportswriters and commentators have characterized subsequent drafted potential NFL quarterback flops as "the next Ryan Leaf". In 2010, NFL Network listed Leaf as the number one NFL quarterback bust of all time, adding that the only good that came out of drafting Leaf for the Chargers is that it put the team in position to draft LaDainian Tomlinson, Drew Brees, and eventually (after it initially appeared Brees himself would be a draft bust) Philip Rivers.

Deadspin ranked Leaf as the sixth worst NFL player of all time in 2011, opining "To call Leaf a bust is unfair to the Blair Thomases and David Carrs of the world."

Leaf in 2016 compared the problems of Cleveland Browns quarterback Johnny Manziel to his own, saying it was like "looking in the mirror" and that the only difference was that Leaf's substance abuse problems happened after he retired. Leaf went on to state that Manziel is able to get the help he needs. According to Leaf, Archie Manning asked Leaf's father before the 2004 NFL draft about how the Chargers treated him. While accepting responsibility for his poor behavior and play, Leaf said that his father telling Archie that the team did not help him was part of why Peyton's brother Eli Manning forced the Chargers to trade him to the New York Giants that year.

== Career statistics ==
=== NFL ===
Year	Team	Games			Passing								Rushing			
Year	Team	GP	GS	Record	Cmp	Att	Pct	Yds	Y/A	TD	Int	Rtg	Att	Yds	Avg	TD
1998	SD	10	9	3–6	111	245	45.3	1,289	5.3	2	15	39.0	27	80	3.0	0
1999	SD	0	0	–	Did not play due to injury											
2000	SD	11	9	1–8	161	322	50.0	1,883	5.8	11	18	56.2	28	54	1.9	0
2001	DAL	4	3	0–3	45	88	51.1	494	5.6	1	3	57.7	4	−7	−1.8	0
Career		25	21	4–17	317	655	48.4	3,666	5.6	14	36	50.0	59	127	2.2	0

=== College ===
Season	Team	Passing								Rushing			
Season	Team	Cmp	Att	Pct	Yds	Y/A	TD	Int	Rtg	Att	Yds	Avg	TD
1995	Washington State	52	97	53.6	654	6.7	4	1	121.8	22	13	0.6	2
1996	Washington State	194	373	52.0	2,811	7.5	21	12	127.5	69	−136	−2.0	6
1997	Washington State	227	410	55.4	3,968	9.7	34	11	158.7	82	−48	−0.6	6
Career		473	880	53.8	7,433	8.4	59	24	141.4	173	−171	−1.0	14

== Life after football ==
After retiring from professional football, Leaf returned to San Diego and became a financial consultant. In 2004, Leaf resumed his education at Washington State University and graduated with a Bachelor of Arts degree in humanities in May 2005.

He then joined Don Carthel's West Texas A&M University staff as a volunteer quarterbacks coach in 2006, commenting, "About a year after I retired from playing, I decided that I wanted to get back to college, where I had the greatest time of my life, and to get involved with college football." He also admitted that he was unprepared for the NFL when he was drafted back in 1998. In April 2008, ESPN described Leaf as having come to terms with his past. He said at the time, "When playing football became a job, it lost its luster for me. I kind of got out of the spotlight, and life's never been this good." But in November 2008 he was put on indefinite leave, and resigned the next day from his coaching position at West Texas A&M for allegedly asking one of his players for a pill to help him deal with pain in his wrist from past injuries. Leaf's usage of painkillers dates back to 2002, when he took Vicodin from a boxing promoter after attending a match in Las Vegas. Leaf described the event as what "started about an eight-year run of off-and-on opioid abuse that took my life to the very bottom".

In October 2009, he went to work in Vancouver, British Columbia as business-development manager for a travel company.

In September 2010, he began writing a regular column about Washington State University football for the website Cougfan.com. He wrote nine columns that football season and his work attracted a strong following among Washington State fans. In December 2010, he signed a contract with Pullman, Washington-based Crimson Oak Publishing to write no fewer than three memoirs. Crimson Oak describes its mission as publishing books with themes of "hope, possibility, and determination". Crimson Oak released Leaf's first book "596 Switch: The Improbable Journey from The Palouse to Pasadena" in October 2011. The book, which he co-wrote with fellow Washington State graduate Greg Witter, focuses on the 1997 Washington State football team that made the 1998 Rose Bowl.

As of April 2018, he was working as a Program Ambassador for Transcend Recovery Community after staying sober the last six years. Transcend is a recovery community with nine locations in Houston, New York, and Los Angeles. In an interview with Ellen DeGeneres, he stated, "I started a foundation called the Focus Intensity Foundation, what I do is I raise money for scholarships for people who can't afford treatment, mental health treatment." In April, he wrote an article for The Players' Tribune titled "Letter to My Younger Self", describing his NFL career and life after its end.

Leaf also has a radio show and works as a college football analyst on television for the Pac-12 Network.

On July 14, 2019, Leaf was hired by ESPN as an analyst for the 2019–2020 college football season for games on ESPN2 and ESPNU. Leaf has worked as an analyst for select weeks of Westwood One's Sunday night Football since the 2021 season and as a Sideline Reporter for the NFL Playoffs on Westwood One.

Leaf joined The CW broadcast team in 2024 and called Pac-12 games.

As of Fall 2025, Leaf worked as a college and NFL football analyst for Westwood One Sports and the CFB lead analyst for CW Sports. He hosts a SiriusXM radio show on NFL Radio. He's also a powerful voice for criminal justice reform and travels to communities around the country addressing the mental health and substance abuse stigma. In addition, he is an Ambassador in Recovery partnering with the Menninger Clinic.

== Personal life ==
From 2001–04, Leaf was married to Nicole Lucia, a Charger cheerleader and daughter of financial radio host Ray Lucia. They separated in November 2003 and eventually divorced. In 2017 he was engaged to and subsequently married former Georgetown Hoyas volleyball player Anna Kleinsorge. The couple have two children, a daughter and a son.

His younger brother Brady Leaf played quarterback for the Oregon Ducks football team behind Dennis Dixon from 2003 to 2006.

In September 2010, the Associated Press reported that Leaf was spending time with his family in Montana.

In June 2011, he had a benign tumor from his brainstem surgically removed.

On April 1, 2012, Leaf attempted suicide and slit his wrists.

=== Legal troubles ===
In May 2009, Leaf was indicted on burglary and controlled substance charges in Texas. He was in a drug-rehabilitation program in British Columbia, Canada at the time of the indictment and was arrested by customs agents at the border on his return to the U.S. as he was intending to fly to Texas to surrender on the indictment. However, his attorney Jeffrey A. Lustick successfully blocked the fugitive warrant extradition process, therefore legally allowing Leaf to go to Texas on his own. Lustick later successfully got the Washington fugitive action against Leaf dismissed with prejudice. On June 17, he posted a $45,000 bond in Washington state for the criminal charges in Texas. In April 2010, he pled guilty in Amarillo, Texas to seven counts of obtaining a controlled substance by fraud and one count of delivery of a simulated controlled substance, all felonies. State District Judge John B. Board sentenced him to ten years of probation and fined him $20,000.

On March 30, 2012, he was arrested on burglary, theft, and drug charges in his home town of Great Falls, Montana. Four days later, he was arrested again on burglary, theft, and two counts of criminal possession of dangerous drugs. As part of a plea bargain on May 8, 2012, he pled guilty to one count of felony burglary and one count of criminal possession of a dangerous drug.

In late April 2012, Texas authorities issued two arrest warrants for him and set his bond at $126,000.

On June 19, 2012, Leaf was sentenced to seven years in custody of the Montana Department of Corrections, with two years suspended if he abided by the conditions imposed by District Judge Kenneth Neil in Montana. He was to spend the first nine months of his sentence in a lockdown addiction treatment facility, Nexus Treatment Center in Lewistown, Montana. But on January 17, 2013, Leaf was remanded to Montana State Prison in Deer Lodge after being found guilty of "behavior that violated conditions of his drug treatment placement". He was also accused of threatening a program staff member.

In May 2014, Leaf was incarcerated at Crossroads Correctional Facility in Shelby, Montana.

On September 9, 2014, a Texas judge sentenced Leaf to five years' imprisonment, giving credit for time spent in prison in Montana. According to ESPN, Leaf would not see further time in jail, but would also not be released from Montana prison. On December 3, 2014, Leaf was released from prison and placed under the supervision of Great Falls Probation and Parole.

On May 22, 2020, Leaf was arrested for misdemeanor domestic battery in Palm Desert, California. Nearly five months later, he admitted to the charge in a plea deal that resulted in three years of probation and a 12-month class on domestic violence.

== Bibliography ==
- Leaf, Ryan D. (2011). 596 Switch: The Improbable Journey from The Palouse to Pasadena. Pullman, Washington: Crimson Oak Publishing. ISBN 978-0982950531.

== See also ==
- List of college football yearly passing leaders
- JaMarcus Russell
