= Fred McCrary =

American football player (born 1972)

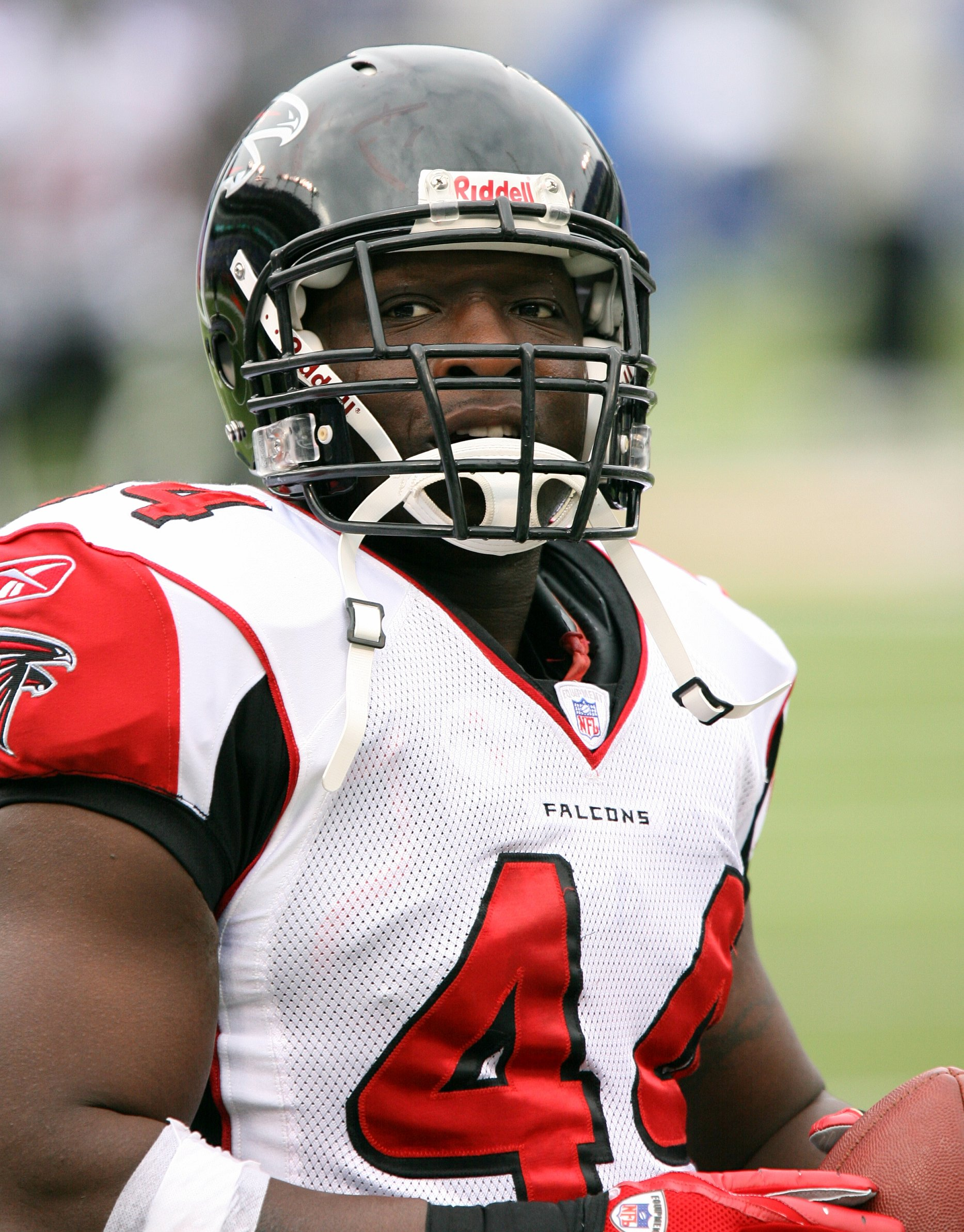
- McCrary with the Atlanta Falcons in 2006

No. 41, 44
- Position: Fullback

Personal information
- Born: September 19, 1972 (age 54); Naples, Florida, U.S.
- Listed height: 6 ft 0 in (1.83 m)
- Listed weight: 247 lb (112 kg)

Career information
- High school: Naples
- College: Mississippi State
- NFL draft: 1995: 6th round, 208th overall pick

Career history
- Philadelphia Eagles (1995); New Orleans Saints (1997); San Diego Chargers (1999–2002); New England Patriots (2003); Atlanta Falcons (2004–2006); Seattle Seahawks (2007)

Awards and highlights
- Super Bowl champion (XXXVIII)

Career NFL statistics
- Rushing yards: 31
- Rushing average: 1.2
- Rushing touchdowns: 1
- Receptions: 113
- Receiving yards: 646
- Receiving touchdowns: 7
- Stats at Pro Football Reference

Freddy Demetrius McCrary (born September 19, 1972) is an American former professional football player who was a fullback in the National Football League (NFL). He played college football for the Mississippi State Bulldogs and was selected in the sixth round of the 1995 NFL draft by the Philadelphia Eagles. From 1995 to 2007, McCrary played for the Eagles and five other teams, including the 2003 New England Patriots Super Bowl XXXVIII championship team that beat the Carolina Panthers.

== Early life ==
McCrary attended Naples High School in Naples, Florida, and lettered in football, basketball, and track. As a senior, he rushed for more than 1,200 yards and was named the school's Athlete of the Year in 1991.

== College career ==
McCrary attended Mississippi State University from 1991 to 1995 and played on the Bulldogs football team for four years as running back, with two as starter. At Mississippi State, McCrary made 32 receptions for 248 yards and 4 touchdowns and rushed 144 yards on 34 carries including one touchdown.

== Professional career ==
=== Philadelphia Eagles (1995) ===
In the 1995 NFL draft, the Philadelphia Eagles picked McCrary in the sixth round as the 208th overall pick. In his rookie season, McCrary started 4 of 13 games and had a 1-yard touchdown run on September 10. McCrary finished 1995 with six special teams tackles, 9 receptions for 60 yards, and 3 rushing attempts. He made a 1-yard kick return on October 15. The Eagles released McCrary on August 25, 1996, and McCrary spent the 1996 season away from football.

=== New Orleans Saints (1997) ===
With the New Orleans Saints in 1997, McCrary played seven games and made 4 receptions for 17 yards, 8 carries for 15 yards, and 2 kickoff returns for 26 yards. He also had eight special teams tackles. On November 23, a 20–3 loss to the Atlanta Falcons, McCrary made 2 receptions for 20 yards and rushed 13 yards on 5 carries. McCrary made a 15-yard kick return on December 7 and 11-yard return on December 21.

The Saints released him prior to the 1998 season for participating in a hazing of rookies that became violent, and no other team would sign McCrary.

=== San Diego Chargers (1999–2002) ===
McCrary returned to professional football in 1999 with the San Diego Chargers and for the first time played all 16 games in a season. With 14 starts, McCrary made 37 receptions for 201 yards and a touchdown in 1999. That touchdown was McCrary's first career receiving touchdown, in which Jim Harbaugh completed an 18-yard pass to McCrary on December 26 against the Oakland Raiders. In the final game of the season on January 2, 2000, a 12–6 win over the defending champion Denver Broncos, McCrary made 3 catches for 39 receiving yards. McCrary earned the team Special Teams Player of the Year honor for 15 special teams tackles. On December 5, McCrary returned one kickoff for 4 yards.

In 2000, a 1–15 season, McCrary started 12 of 15 games played and made 18 receptions for 141 yards and 2 touchdowns, 7 carries for 8 yards, and 11 special teams tackles. Although McCrary rushed for 9 yards on 5 carries on September 24 against the Seattle Seahawks, a potential 4-yard first down run of his was nullified due to an illegal formation penalty on Ben Coleman. On November 12, in a 17–7 loss to the Miami Dolphins, McCrary made an 8-yard touchdown reception from Ryan Leaf in the first play of the fourth quarter. On October 1 against defending champion St. Louis Rams, McCrary made 3 receptions, including one for a touchdown, for a 24 receiving yards.

McCrary started 13 of 16 games in 2001 and made 13 receptions for 71 yards, 5 special teams tackles, and 2 rushes for 3 yards. His game that year with the most receiving yards was on September 1, a 30–3 win over the Washington Redskins, in which McCrary made 2 receptions for 22 yards.

In 2002, McCrary started all 16 games and made 22 catches for 96 yards and 3 touchdowns. Like last season, McCrary's best offensive game in the year, as McCrary made 3 receptions for 30 yards in a 34–6 win over the Cincinnati Bengals on September 8. On November 17, McCrary scored on a 1-yard catch from Drew Brees in the tying touchdown drive that forced overtime against the San Francisco 49ers. San Diego won 20–17. McCrary's blocking helped running back LaDainian Tomlinson rush for 1,236 yards in the 2002 season, the first Charges player to do so since 1994.

=== New England Patriots (2003) ===
Because of frequent injuries, McCrary only played in 6 games (3 starts) in 2003 for the New England Patriots, who would later win Super Bowl XXXVIII. In his one season with New England, McCrary made 2 catches for 12 yards and rushed 3 yards on 3 carries.

=== Atlanta Falcons (2004–2006) ===
McCrary started 2 of 3 games for the Atlanta Falcons as a late-season replacement for Stanley Pritchett. McCrary made 2 receptions for 23 yards. As an offensive line blocker, McCrary helped block for Warrick Dunn's 134-yard game on December 18 and 132-yard rushing game on January 2, 2005.

McCrary played 15 games in 2005 and had 3 receptions for 12 yards. As an offensive line blocker, McCrary contributed to a rushing game that averaged 159.1 yards per game.

In 2006, McCrary again played 15 games, this season as a reserve fullback mainly playing special teams. He made 3 receptions for 13 yards. Due to a broken foot, McCrary missed the first game. On September 17, McCrary caught a pass from Michael Vick 4 yards for a touchdown in the Falcons' 14–3 win over the Tampa Bay Buccaneers. McCrary also made a 10-yard kick return on October 1 and 7-yard kickoff return on October 29.

He was cut from the Atlanta Falcons in the 2007 offseason.

=== Seattle Seahawks (2007) ===
He was signed by the Seattle Seahawks on October 10, 2007, though he was cut again on December 5. McCrary played six games.

== Personal life ==
In 1998, not signed with any team, McCrary worked as a night shift corrections officer at a maximum security prison in Orleans Parish, Louisiana. Interviewed by the North County Times, McCrary described the prison as housing mostly murderers and recalled seeing rape and violence regularly. McCrary is married and has three children. In 2012, McCrary joined over 1,000 other NFL players suing the NFL over concussions suffered during their careers.
