= Jason Thomas =

Jason Thomas may refer to:

- Jason Thomas (Marine) (born 1974), United States Marine who located and rescued people after the collapse of the World Trade Center
- Jason Thomas (American football) (born 1977), American football player
- Jason Thomas (footballer) (born 1997), Vanuatuan footballer
- Jason Thomas, drummer with the band Forq
