= George Floyd protests in Montana =

2020 civil unrest after the murder of George Floyd

- Part of George Floyd protests
- Date: May 29 – June 7, 2020 (1 week and 2 days)
- Location: Montana, United States
- Caused by: Police brutality; Institutional racism against African Americans; Reaction to the murder of George Floyd; Economic, racial and social inequality

This is a list of protests related to the murder of George Floyd in Montana, United States.

== Locations ==
=== Billings ===
About 50 primarily high school and college-age protesters stood in front of the Billings Police Department's downtown station on May 30. On June 7, over 1,000 protesters gathered outside the Yellowstone County Courthouse chanting "Black Lives Matter" and "I can't breathe".

=== Bozeman ===
Approximately 2,000 protesters marched peacefully from Bogert Park to the Gallatin County Courthouse the afternoon of May 31.

=== Butte ===
On June 5, around 100 protesters gathered outside the Butte-Silver Bow Courthouse to support Black Lives Matter. A moment of silence was held to honor George Floyd and others who died from police violence.

=== Great Falls ===
On May 31, a few hundred people gathered along the Central Avenue West bridge to protest the murder of George Floyd.

=== Hamilton ===
On June 7 around 200 demonstrators protested near Main Street.

=== Havre ===
On May 31, around 75 people peacefully marched through town to protest the murder of George Floyd. They knelt for eight minutes outside the Havre Police Department to honor Floyd, then marched to Town Square.

=== Helena ===
About 150 people in Helena gathered in front of the Montana State Capitol building the afternoon of May 31.

=== Kalispell ===
On June 6, over 1,000 people held a largely peaceful protest in Depot Park to support Black Lives Matter and George Floyd. Many armed counter-protesters attended the event as well in order to keep the peace, namely to protect the nearby Flathead County Veterans Memorial from being vandalized.

=== Missoula ===
Hundreds of people peacefully protested outside the Missoula County Courthouse on May 29.

=== Whitefish ===
Beginning on June 1, crowds of up to 70 protesters began gathering daily to support the worldwide Black Lives Matter movement. On multiple occasions, the group had been stalked by a 51-year-old white man who took his provocations to a "nose-to-nose" level, knocking signs out of hands and yelling expletives in protesters' faces. The man was charged with disorderly conduct on June 4.
