= Terrell Fletcher =

American football player (born 1973)

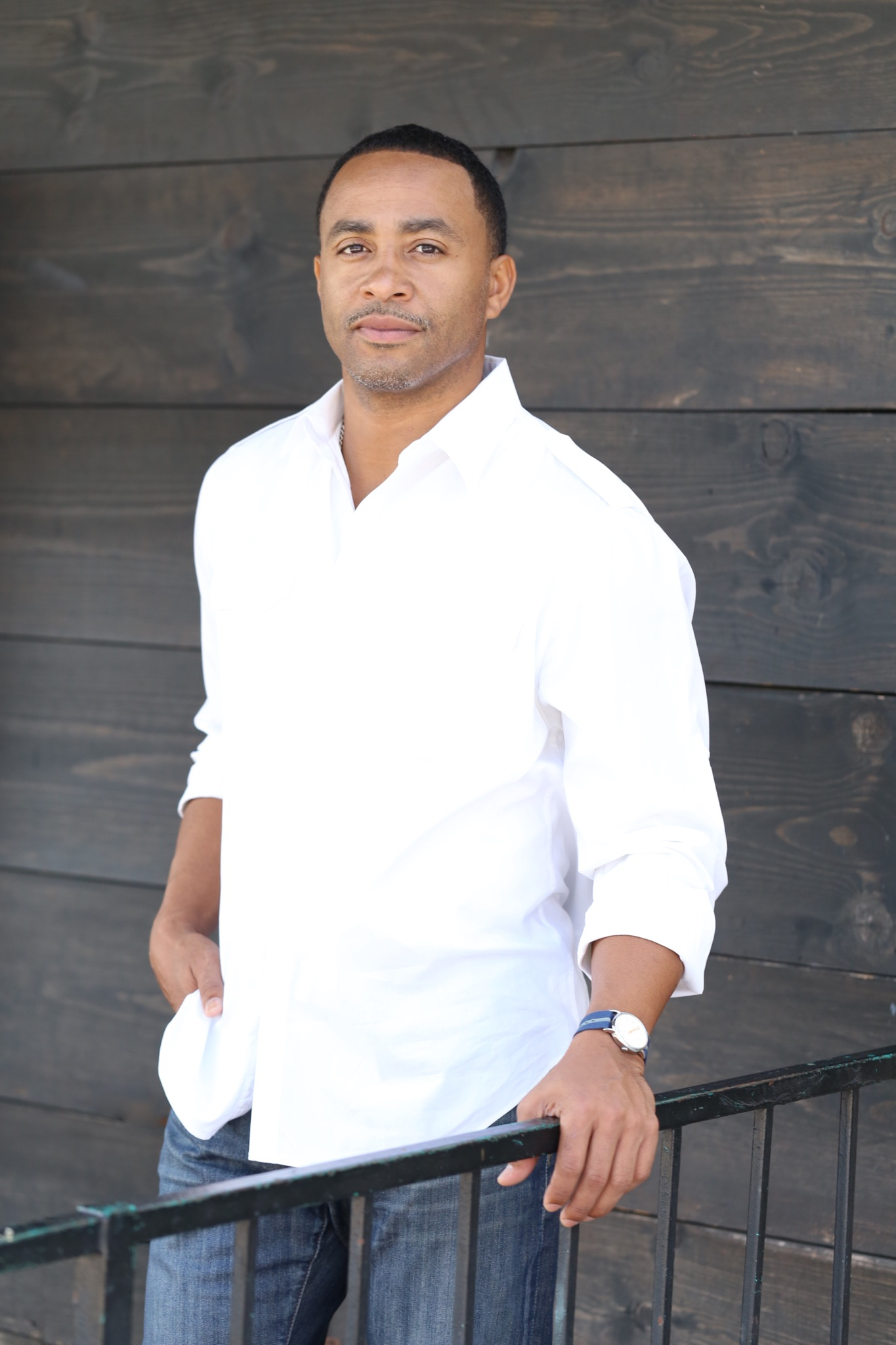

No. 41
- Position: Running back

Personal information
- Born: September 14, 1973 (age 53); St. Louis, Missouri, U.S.
- Listed height: 5 ft 8 in (1.73 m)
- Listed weight: 196 lb (89 kg)

Career information
- High school: Hazelwood East (St. Louis)
- College: Wisconsin
- NFL draft: 1995: 2nd round, 51st overall pick

Career history
- San Diego Chargers (1995–2002)

Career NFL statistics
- Rushing yards: 1,871
- Rushing average: 3.6
- Rushing touchdowns: 10
- Receptions: 259
- Receiving yards: 1,943
- Receiving touchdowns: 3
- Stats at Pro Football Reference

Terrell Antoine Fletcher (born September 14, 1973) is an American former professional football player who spent his entire eight-year career as a running back for the San Diego Chargers of the National Football League (NFL). He attended the University of Wisconsin–Madison where he played football as running back for the Wisconsin Badgers, the 1994 Rose Bowl champions. In 1995, Fletcher was named MVP in the Hall of Fame Outback Bowl. With the Chargers, he rushed for 1,871 yards and gained 1,943 yards receiving, leading all Charger running backs in receptions for five consecutive seasons, from 1996 to 2000. He is the older brother of former Indianapolis Colts tight end Bryan Fletcher. On November 4, 2001, he caught Drew Brees's first completion.

Fletcher graduated from Hazelwood East High School in Hazelwood, Missouri in 1991. He is a first-generation college graduate. He graduated from the University of Wisconsin–Madison with a bachelor's degree in English Literature (1998). In 2003, Fletcher graduated with a master's degree in Religious Studies, from Southern California Seminary. He is also has a Doctorate of Transformational Leadership from Bakke Graduate University (2018).

Fletcher is currently an ordained Bishop and Senior Pastor for City of Hope International Church in San Diego, California and married to Kavalya Fletcher (formerly Kavalya Young).

== College statistics ==
- 1991: 446 rushing yards and 4 touchdowns on 109 carries. 17 catches for 125 yards and 1 touchdown.
- 1992: 496 rushing yards on 96 carries. 5 catches for 75 yards and 1 touchdown.
- 1993: 996 rushing yards and 9 touchdowns on 165 carries. 13 catches for 131 yards and 1 touchdown.
- 1994: 1,476 rushing yards and 12 touchdowns on 244 carries. 23 catches for 180 yards and 1 touchdown.

== Professional career ==
=== San Diego Chargers ===
Terrell Fletcher was drafted with the 19th pick in the second round (51st pick overall) of the 1995 NFL draft by the San Diego Chargers. In 1996, Fletcher was a restricted free agent for the Chargers, and was re-signed. In 2000, Fletcher led the Chargers in rushing, rushing for 384 yards on 116 carries. He was the last player until Mike Tolbert in 2010 to lead the Chargers in rushing yards that wasn't LaDainian Tomlinson. To make room for newly acquired wide receiver Tim Dwight, whom the Chargers acquired via trade from the Atlanta Falcons on draft day 2001, the Chargers released Fletcher, who agreed to re-sign at a later date. On April 23, 2001, he signed a 4-year $6.3 million contract to return to San Diego. In 2002, Fletcher was limited to just 10 games, missing time with a sprained ankle he suffered in an early October loss to the Denver Broncos. On February 27, 2003, the Chargers released Fletcher, saving $1.64 million in cap space. At the same time of releasing Fletcher, they released a slew of other veterans including safety Rodney Harrison and wide receiver Curtis Conway, among others. Fletcher was known for his receiving skills out of the backfield, leading all Charger running backs in receptions for five consecutive seasons, from 1996 to 2000. This included finishing second on the team in receptions with 61 in 1996. At the time of his release, Fletcher was 13th in Chargers history in rushing, with 1,871 yards, and 9th in Chargers history with 259 receptions.

== NFL career statistics ==
Year	Team	Games		Rushing					Receiving					Fumbles	
Year	Team	GP	GS	Att	Yds	Avg	Lng	TD	Rec	Yds	Avg	Lng	TD	Fum	Lost
1995	SD	16	0	26	140	5.4	46	1	3	26	8.7	15	0	2	0
1996	SD	16	0	77	282	3.7	19	0	61	476	7.8	41	2	1	0
1997	SD	13	1	51	161	3.2	13	0	39	292	7.5	25	0	4	3
1998	SD	12	5	153	543	3.5	21	5	30	188	6.3	22	0	1	1
1999	SD	15	2	48	126	2.6	16	0	45	360	8.0	25	0	1	0
2000	SD	16	6	116	384	3.3	21	3	48	355	7.4	26	1	2	2
2001	SD	13	0	29	207	3.7	26	0	23	184	8.0	27	0	1	1
2002	SD	10	0	26	128	4.9	15	1	10	62	6.2	13	0	0	0
Career		111	14	526	1,871	3.6	46	10	259	1,943	7.5	41	3	12	7

== Personal life ==
From March 2012 until June 2023, he was the Senior Pastor of the City of Hope International Church in San Diego, California. In 2007, Fletcher married actress and businesswoman Sheree Zampino. Through this marriage he was the stepfather to Zampino’s son with Will Smith. The couple divorced in 2015 after eight years of marriage. Contrary to popular belief, the pair does not have a daughter. In 2018, Fletcher married Kavalya Young. The couple have three children, a daughter Kya and fraternal twins, son Kingston and daughter Kory.

- Personal Website: www.terrellfletcher.com
- Speaking Website: www.meetterrell.com
- Church Website: www.thecityonline.org

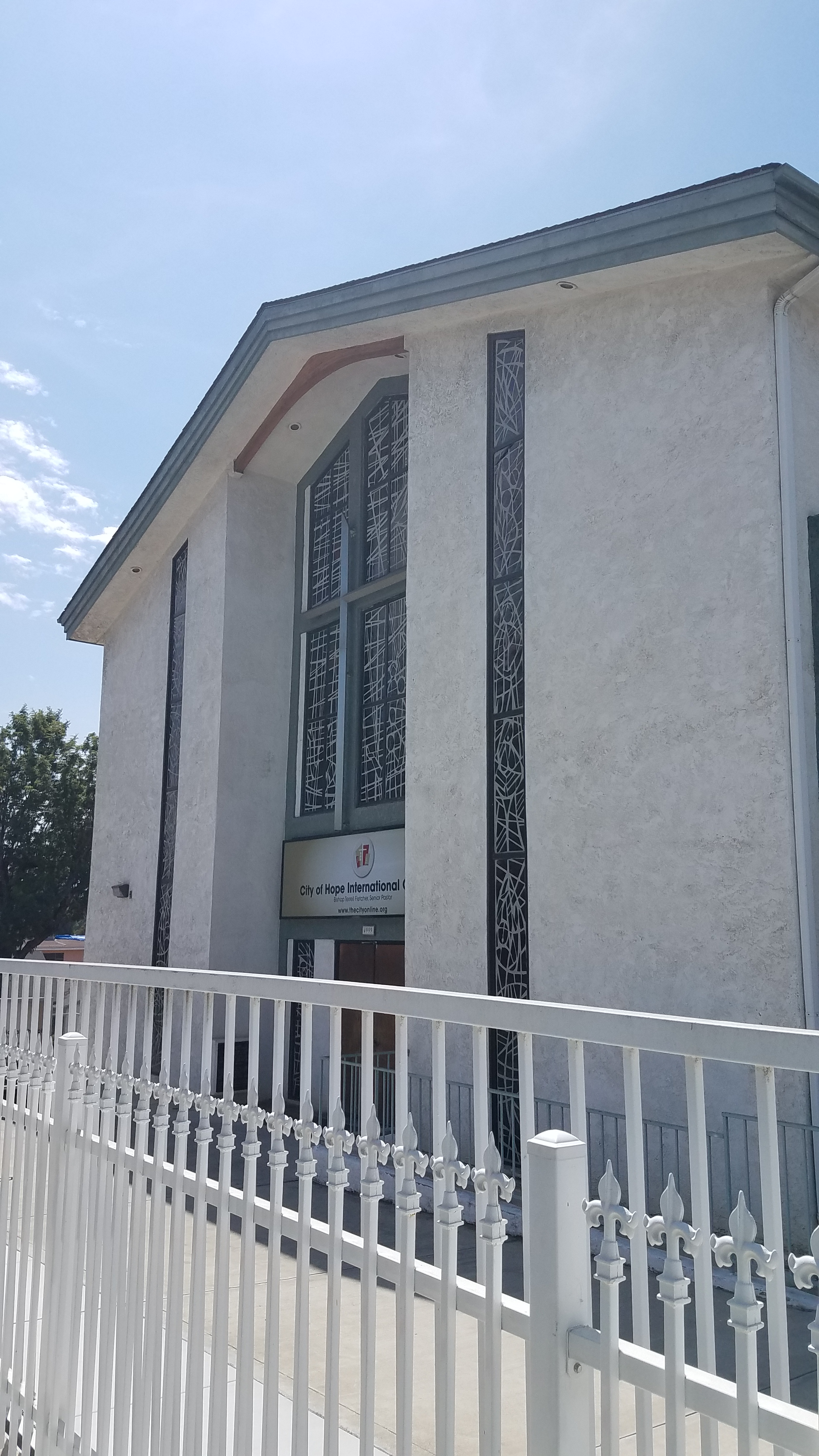
City of Hope International Church, San Diego, CA
