= Murder of Miranda Fenner =

1998 murder in Montana, United States

Coordinates: 45.668301°N 108.777474°W

Miranda Fenner
- Born: Miranda Colleen Fenner; December 26, 1979; Sacramento, California, U.S.
- Died: November 15, 1998 (aged 18); Billings, Montana, U.S.
- Cause of death: Homicide by stabbing

Miranda Colleen Fenner (December 26, 1979 – November 15, 1998) was an American woman who was murdered while working at a video store in Laurel, Montana. The murder case received wide media attention and is one of the highest-profile murder cases in Yellowstone County history.

Fenner's murder was featured on the Discovery Channel's Sensing Murder and the Montel Williams Show. Zachary David O'Neill confessed to killing her in March 2017, a fact first publicized in July 2019 when he pleaded guilty to her murder.

== Murder ==
On November 15, 1998, 18-year-old Miranda Fenner was working at The Movie Store, a locally owned video rental store in Laurel, Montana. At around 8:15 p.m., a passing motorist noticed a woman attempting to crawl out the doorstep of the video store. The motorist stopped and called 911. The woman, discovered to be Fenner, had been stabbed multiple times in the head and neck, and her throat had also been slashed.

Fenner was transported via Life Flight to St. Vincent Healthcare hospital in nearby Billings, where she died of her injuries within two hours.

== Investigation ==
Over 700 people were interviewed in relation to Fenner's murder, but no suspects had been named. Police could not find a motive nor suspect in the case, though it was noted that a small amount of cash had been taken from the video store's register; because of this, robbery could not be entirely ruled out as a motive.

In 2000, a man who was killed in a police shootout in Glendive, Montana, had allegedly made statements prior to his death that he had been involved in Fenner's murder; however, Glendive police reported that the statements were rumors and were not confirmed.

In 2012, Fenner's murder was given to the Billings Police Department's cold case unit. Fenner's mother, Sherry Fenner, would later advocate for an instatement of Marsy's Law in the state of Montana in 2015.

== Arrest ==
In March 2017, the Yellowstone County Sheriff’s Office interviewed Zachary David O'Neill in connection with a case involving the rape, slashing, and attempted murder of a newspaper carrier in Billings which occurred in September 1998. During this questioning with law enforcement, O'Neill admitted to being responsible for the newspaper carrier's attack, and subsequently confessed to the murder of Fenner. O'Neill pleaded guilty to her murder on July 22, 2019. In August 2019, he was sentenced to three concurrent life terms, with parole eligibility in 30 years.

According to O'Neill, he murdered Fenner during an attempt to rob the video store. He later disposed of the murder weapon—a hunting knife—in Jordan, Montana, during a trip with his father.

== Media depictions ==
Fenner's murder garnered national attention. It was the subject of a Sensing Murder episode on the Discovery Channel in 2007. In 2006, the case had been featured on the Montel Williams Show, in which psychic Sylvia Browne claimed two men were responsible for the murder, aged 19 and 24.
