= Lake County Sheriff's Office =

Lake County Sheriff's Office may refer to:

- Lake County Sheriff's Office (California)
- Lake County Sheriff's Office (Colorado), a county law enforcement agencies in Colorado
- Lake County Sheriff's Office (Florida)
- Lake County Sheriff's Office, a county law enforcement agency in Illinois
- Lake County Sheriff's Department (Indiana)
- Lake County Sheriff's Office (Michigan), a county law enforcement agency in Michigan
- Lake County Sheriff's Office (Minnesota), a county law enforcement agency in Minnesota
- Lake County Sheriff's Office, a county law enforcement agency in Montana
- Lake County Sheriff's Office (Ohio), a county law enforcement agency in Ohio
- Lake County Sheriff's Office (Oregon), a county law enforcement agency in Oregon
- Lake County Sheriff's Office (South Dakota), a county law enforcement agency in South Dakota
- Lake County Sheriff's Office (Tennessee), a county law enforcement agency in Tennessee

== See also ==
- Salt Lake County Sheriff's Office
