= Montana Women's Prison =

Women prison in Billings, Montana

- Interactive map of Montana Women's Prison
- Location: Billings, Montana; 45°46′30″N 108°29′45″W
- Status: Operational
- Capacity: 240
- Population: 240 (2024)
- Managed by: Montana Department of Corrections
- Director: Brian Gootkin
- Governor: Greg Gianforte
- Warden: Alex Schroeckenstein
- Website: https://cor.mt.gov/Adult/MWP

The Montana Women's Prison is a state-run correctional facility in Billings, Montana housing roughly 250 female prisoners. Originally a psychiatric hospital, the building was purchased by the Montana Department of Corrections in 1994.

Inmates can take vocational courses, including print screening, design work, direct printing, embroidery, and manufacturing. The prison also offers the "Prison Paws" program, parenting courses, and substance abuse treatment.
