= David Binn =

American football player (born 1972)

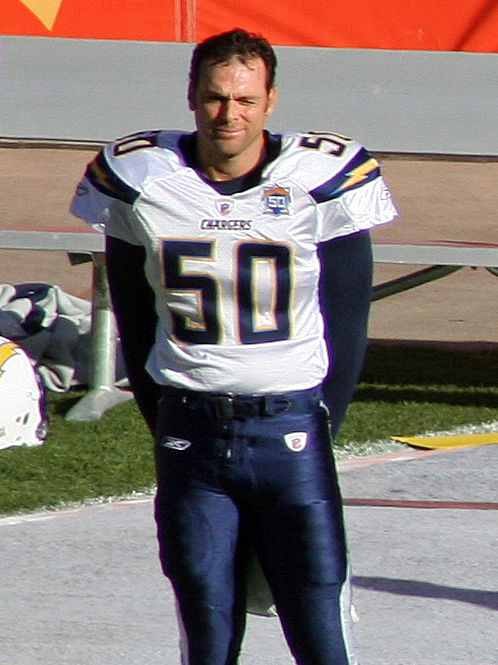
- Binn in 2009

No. 50, 54
- Position: Long snapper

Personal information
- Born: February 6, 1972 (age 54); San Mateo, California, U.S.
- Listed height: 6 ft 3 in (1.91 m)
- Listed weight: 228 lb (103 kg)

Career information
- High school: San Mateo
- College: California
- NFL draft: 1994: undrafted

Career history
- San Diego Chargers (1994–2010); Denver Broncos (2011)

Awards and highlights
- Pro Bowl (2006)

Career NFL statistics
- Games played: 256
- Total tackles: 36
- Fumble recoveries: 1
- Stats at Pro Football Reference

David Aaron Binn (born February 6, 1972) is an American former professional football player who was a long snapper for 18 seasons in the National Football League (NFL). He played college football for the California Golden Bears and was signed by the San Diego Chargers as an undrafted free agent in 1994. He was the last remaining active member of the Chargers' Super Bowl XXIX team, as well as their infamous 2000 season, where they went 1–15.

== Early life ==
Binn attended San Mateo High School in San Mateo, California, and was a letterwinner in football, basketball, and golf. In football, he was a two-time All-Peninsula Athletic League honoree. He then played college football as a linebacker and long snapper for the University of California, Berkeley.

== College career ==
Binn attended the University of California at Berkeley, where he played in 42 games as a long snapper. He earned a BA degree in Ecology and Interdisciplinary Studies in 1995. He was a member of the Kappa Alpha fraternity.

== Professional career ==
Binn surpassed Junior Seau and Russ Washington with his 201st career game played as a Charger on November 19, 2006, making him the all-time leader. He was selected for the first time to the 2007 Pro Bowl squad, making him the eleventh selection from the 2006 Chargers chosen to represent the AFC in Hawaii. Binn suffered a hamstring injury in Week 1 of 2010 that ended his team-record streak of 179 consecutive games played.

After 17 seasons in San Diego, he was released on August 30, 2011. He was Chargers' all-time leader in games played with 256, not including 12 in the post-season.

On January 13, 2012, Binn signed with the Denver Broncos, one day before their playoff game against the New England Patriots.

== Personal life ==
Binn dated Pamela Anderson in 2007 and 2008.

== See also ==
- List of select Jewish football players
