= Crossroads Correctional Facility =

Prison in Montana, USA

Coordinates: 48°30′07″N 111°53′35″W

- Interactive map of Crossroads Correctional Facility
- Location: 50 Crossroads Drive Shelby, Montana
- Status: open
- Security class: mixed
- Capacity: 664
- Opened: 1999
- Managed by: Corrections Corporation of America

Crossroads Correctional Facility is prison for men located in unincorporated Toole County, Montana just west of Shelby. The facility is privately operated by the Corrections Corporation of America. It is the only private prison in the state.

The facility houses detainees under contract with the Montana Department of Corrections and the United States Marshals Service. The facility opened in 1999 and is "multi-security".

Crossroads was the detention site for Montana medical marijuana provider Richard Flor, who died a few months into his five-year federal sentence, allegedly because of a lack of appropriate medical care.

In December 2014, former NFL quarterback Ryan Leaf was released from the facility on good behavior.
