= Montana Department of Corrections =

State agency of Montana

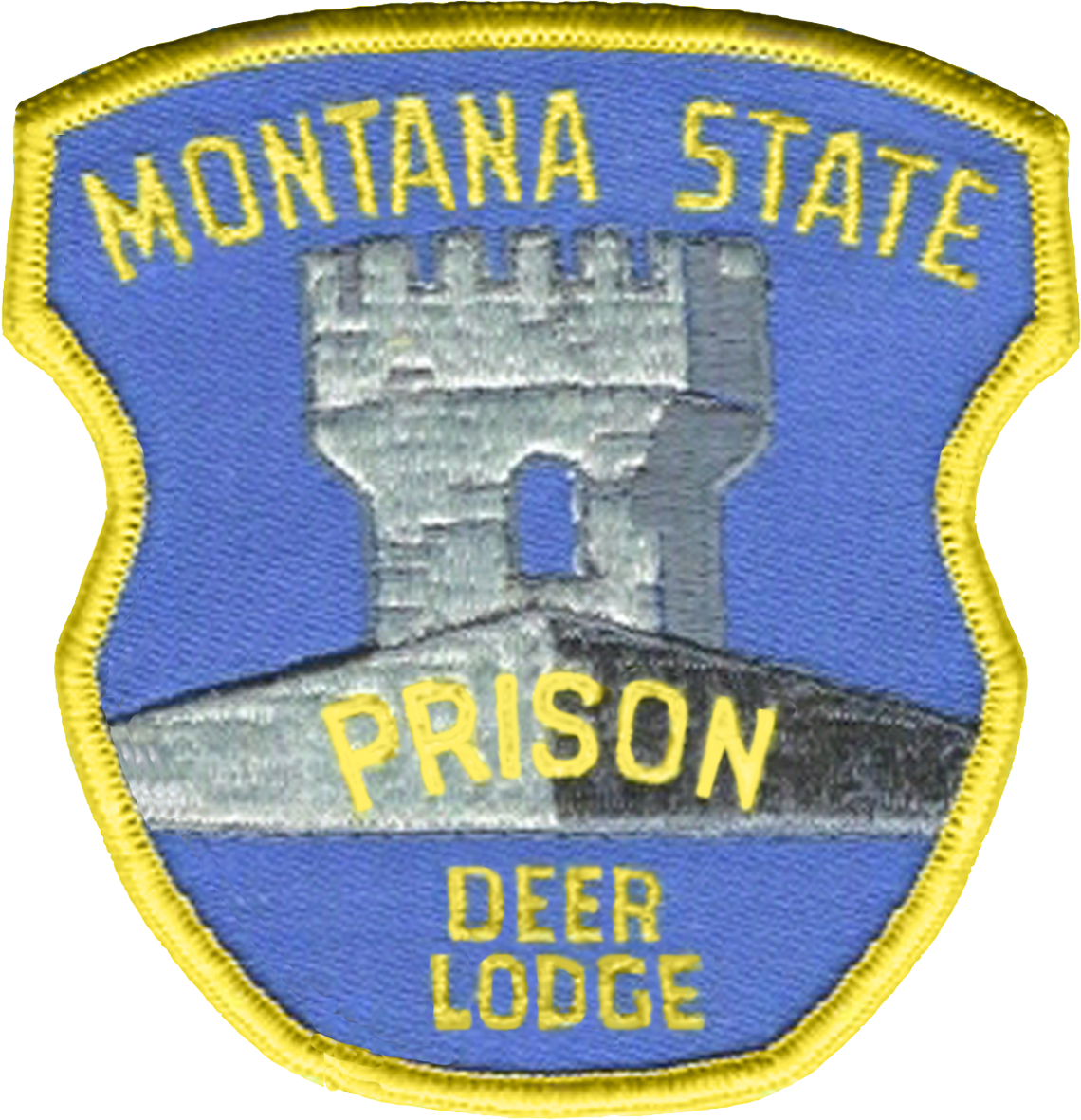
- Abbreviation: MTDOC

Agency overview
- Formed: 1871
- Employees: 11,000

Jurisdictional structure
- Operations jurisdiction: Montana, USA
- Map of Montana Department of Corrections's jurisdiction
- Area: 147,040 square miles (380,800 km^{2})
- Population: 1,062,305 (2018 est.)
- General nature: Civilian police

Operational structure
- Headquarters: 5 S. Last Chance Gulch Helena, MT
- Elected officer responsible: Greg Gianforte, Governor of the State of Montana
- Agency executives: Brian Gootkin, Director of Corrections; Cynthia L. Wolken, Deputy Director of Corrections
- Parent agency: State of Montana

Facilities
- Community Corrections Secure facilities: 11 5

Website
- Montana DOC Website

The Montana Department of Corrections is a state agency of Montana that operates state prisons and manages community-corrections programs. The agency has its headquarters in Helena.

== Adult secure facilities ==
Male

- Montana State Prison (Unincorporated Powell County, near Deer Lodge)
- Private/regional prisons for men
  - Cascade County Regional Prison (Great Falls)
  - Crossroads Correctional Facility (Unincorporated Toole County, near Shelby), privately operated by the Corrections Corporation of America
  - Dawson County Correctional Facility (Glendive)

Female

- Montana Women's Prison (Billings)

== Adult Community Corrections ==
Operated by the state, county government or private nonprofits under contract with the state.

- Missoula Assessment and Sanction Center, Missoula
- Nexus Meth Treatment Center (males), Lewistown
- Elkhorn Meth Treatment Center (females), Boulder
- START revocation and sanction center, Anaconda
- Connections Corrections, Butte and Warm Springs
- WATCh DUI treatment program, Warm Springs and Glendive
- Treasure State Correctional Training Center (boot camp), Deer Lodge
- Passages Women's Center, Billings
- Pine Hills Correctional Facility, Miles City
- Prerelease centers in Billings, Bozeman, Butte, Great Falls, Helena and Missoula
- Probation and parole offices in 23 communities

== Youth Services Division ==
The Youth Services Division operates juvenile correctional facilities. Pine Hills Youth Correctional Facility in unincorporated Custer County, near Miles City, serves delinquent boys. Riverside Youth Correctional Facility, a 20-bed facility for girls, is located in Boulder.

== Youth Community Corrections ==
The Youth Community Corrections Bureau forms the youth parole network.

- Youth Transition Centers, Great Falls
- Juvenile parole

== See also ==
- List of law enforcement agencies in Montana
- List of United States state correction agencies
- List of U.S. state prisons
