= List of law enforcement agencies in Montana =

This is a list of law enforcement agencies in the state of Montana.

According to the US Bureau of Justice Statistics' 2008 Census of State and Local Law Enforcement Agencies, the state had 119 law enforcement agencies employing 3,229 sworn police officers, about 201 for each 100,000 residents.

== State agencies ==
- Montana Department of Corrections
- Montana Department of Justice
  - Montana Highway Patrol
  - Division of Criminal Investigations
  - Gambling Control Division
    - Investigation Bureau
- Montana Department of Livestock
  - Brands Enforcement Division
- Montana Department of Fish, Wildlife, and Parks
  - Law Enforcement Bureau
- Montana Department of Transportation
  - Motor Carrier Services
    - Enforcement Bureau

== County agencies ==
- Beaverhead County Sheriff's Office
- Big Horn County Sheriff's Office
- Blaine County Sheriff's Office
- Broadwater County Sheriff's Office
- Carbon County Sheriff's Office
- Carter County Sheriff's Office
- Cascade County Sheriff's Office
- Chouteau County Sheriff's Office
- Custer County Sheriff's Office
- Daniels County Sheriff's Office
- Dawson County Sheriff's Office
- Fallon County Sheriff's Office
- Fergus County Sheriff's Office
- Flathead County Sheriff's Office
- Gallatin County Sheriff's Office
- Garfield County Sheriff's Office
- Glacier County Sheriff's Office
- Golden Valley County Sheriff's Office
- Granite County Sheriff's Office
- Hill County Sheriff's Office
- Jefferson County Sheriff's Office
- Judith Basin County Sheriff's Office
- Lake County Sheriff's Office
- Lewis and Clark County Sheriff's Office
- Liberty County Sheriff's Office
- Lincoln County Sheriff's Office
- Madison County Sheriff's Office
- McCone County Sheriff's Office
- Meagher County Sheriff's Office
- Mineral County Sheriff's Office
- Missoula County Sheriff's Office
- Musselshell County Sheriff's Office
- Park County Sheriff's Office
- Petroleum County Sheriff's Office
- Phillips County Sheriff's Office
- Pondera County Sheriff's Office
- Powder River County Sheriff's Office
- Powell County Sheriff's Office
- Prairie County Sheriff's Office
- Ravalli County Sheriff's Office
- Richland County Sheriff's Office
- Roosevelt County Sheriff's Office
- Rosebud County Sheriff's Office
- Sanders County Sheriff's Office
- Sheridan County Sheriff's Office
- Stillwater County Sheriff's Office
- Sweet Grass County Sheriff's Office
- Teton County Sheriff's Office
- Toole County Sheriff's Office
- Treasure County Sheriff's Office
- Valley Treasure County Sheriff's Office
- Wheatland County Sheriff's Office
- Wibaux County Sheriff's Office
- Yellowstone County Sheriff's Office

== Combined city and county agencies ==
- Anaconda-Deer Lodge County Law Enforcement Department
- Butte-Silver Bow Law Enforcement Department

== City agencies ==
- Baker Police Department
- Belgrade Police Department
- Billings Police Department
- Boulder Police Department
- Bozeman Police Department
- Bridger Police Department
- Chinook Police Department
- Colstrip Police Department
- Columbia Falls Police Department
- Columbus Police Department
- Conrad Police Department
- Cut Bank Police Department
- Darby Police Department
- Deer Lodge Police Department
- Dillon Police Department
- East Helena Police Department
- Ennis Police Department
- Eureka Police Department
- Fairview Police Department
- Glasgow Police Department
- Glendive Police Department
- Great Falls Police Department
- Hamilton Police Department
- Hardin Police Department
- Havre Police Department
- Helena Police Department
- Hot Springs Police Department
- Kalispell Police Department
- Laurel Police Department
- Lewistown Police Department
- Libby Police Department
- Livingston Police Department
- Manhattan Police Department
- Miles City Police Department
- Missoula Police Department
- Plains Police Department
- Polson Police Department
- Red Lodge Police Department
- Ronan Police Department
- St. Ignatius Police Department
- Sheridan Police Department
- Sidney Police Department
- Stevensville Police Department
- Thompson Falls Police Department
- Troy Police Department
- West Yellowstone Police Department
- Whitefish Police Department
- Wolf Point Police Department

== Tribal agencies ==
- Blackfeet Law Enforcement Services
- Blackfeet Nation Fish & Wildlife
- Chippewa Cree Law Enforcement Services
- Chippewa Cree Tribes Fish & Game
- Crow Police Department
- Crow Tribe Fish & Game
- Confederated Salish and Kootenai Tribal Fish & Game
- Confederated Salish and Kootenai Tribal Police Department
- Fort Belknap Law Enforcement Services
- Fort Belknap Fish & Wildlife Department
- Fort Peck Department of Law and Justice
- Fort Peck Fish and Wildlife Department

== College and university agencies ==
- Montana State University Police Department
- Montana State University Billings Police Department
- University of Montana Police Department

== Airport agencies ==
- Bert Mooney Airport Authority Police
- Gallatin Airport Authority Department of Public Safety
- Great Falls International Airport Authority Police Department
- Billings Logan International Airport Police Department
- Missoula County Airport Authority Public Safety Department
