= Trevor Gaylor =

American gridiron football player (born 1977)

No. 82, 81, 85
- Position: Wide receiver

Personal information
- Born: November 3, 1977 (age 49); St. Louis, Missouri, U.S.
- Listed height: 6 ft 3 in (1.91 m)
- Listed weight: 195 lb (88 kg)

Career information
- High school: Hazelwood West (Hazelwood, Missouri)
- College: Miami (OH) (1996–1999)
- NFL draft: 2000: 4th round, 79th overall pick

Career history
- San Diego Chargers (2000–2001); Atlanta Falcons (2002); Detroit Lions (2004)*; Edmonton Eskimos (2004–2007)
- * Offseason or practice squad member only

Awards and highlights
- Grey Cup champion (2005); Second-team All-MAC (1999)

Career NFL statistics
- Receptions: 52
- Receiving yards: 784
- Touchdowns: 4
- Stats at Pro Football Reference

Trevor Alexander Gaylor (born November 3, 1977) is an American former professional football player who was a wide receiver in the National Football League (NFL) and Canadian Football League (CFL). He played college football for the Miami RedHawks and was selected in the fourth round of the 2000 NFL draft by the San Diego Chargers. Gaylor was also a member of the Atlanta Falcons and Detroit Lions of the NFL, and the Edmonton Eskimos of the CFL.

== Early life ==
Trevor Alexander Gaylor was born on November 3, 1977 in St. Louis, Missouri. He played high school football at Hazelwood West High School in Hazelwood, Missouri.

== College career ==
Gaylor played college football for the Redhawks of Miami University from 1996 to 1999, and was a four-year letterman. He caught eight passes for 75 yards as a freshman in 1996. He totaled 29 receptions for 375 yards and four touchdowns in 1997. Gaylor caught 38 passes for 653 yards and five touchdowns during the 1998 season while also rushing five times for 40 yards and one touchdown. He recorded 53 receptions for 1,028 yards and 11 touchdowns his senior season in 1999 while also throwing an 81-yard touchdown. He was named second-team All-Mid-American Conference in 1999.

Overall, Gaylor caught 128 passes for 2,131 yards and 20 touchdowns during his college career. He set Miami career records in receptions, receiving yards, and receiving touchdowns.

== Professional career ==
=== San Diego Chargers ===
Gaylor was selected by the San Diego Chargers in the fourth round, with the 111th overall pick, of the 2000 NFL draft. He officially signed with the team on July 20. He played in 14 games, starting two, during his rookie year in 2000, catching 13 passes for 182 yards and one touchdown.

Gaylor appeared in seven games, starting three, in 2001, recording 14 receptions for 217 yards.

=== Atlanta Falcons ===
On September 1, 2002, he was traded to the Atlanta Falcons for a seventh round pick in the 2004 NFL draft. He played in 13 games, starting two, for the Falcons in 2002, catching 25 passes for 385 yards and three touchdowns. Gaylor also appeared in two playoff games for the Falcons that season, totaling four receptions for 35 yards.

He became a free agent after the 2002 season, and re-signed with the Falcons on March 19, 2003. He was waived on August 25, 2003.

=== Detroit Lions ===
Gaylor signed a reserve/future contract with the Detroit Lions on January 7, 2004. He was waived on August 30, 2004.

=== Edmonton Eskimos ===
Gaylor was signed to the practice roster of the Edmonton Eskimos of the Canadian Football League in September 2004 and spent the remainder of the season there. He dressed in all 18 games for the Eskimos in 2005, catching 72 passes for 929 yards and five touchdowns. On November 27, 2005, the Eskimos defeated the Montreal Alouettes 38–35 in overtime to win the 93rd Grey Cup.

He only dressed in eight games in 2006, recording 24 receptions for 382 yards and two touchdowns. He was benched multiple times during the season due to inconsistency.

Gaylor dressed in 15 games in 2007, catching 56 passes for 644 yards and four touchdowns. In September 2007, he was fined an undisclosed amount by the CFL for "disparaging remarks" he made about officials in the Edmonton Journal.

== NFL career statistics ==
Legend
**Bold**	Career high

=== Regular season ===
Year	Team	Games		Receiving					
Year	Team	GP	GS	Tgt	Rec	Yds	Avg	Lng	TD
2000	SDG	**14**	2	31	13	182	14.0	62	1
2001	SDG	7	**3**	34	14	217	**15.5**	31	0
2002	ATL	13	2	**54**	**25**	**385**	15.4	**74**	**3**
Career		34	7	119	52	784	15.1	74	4

=== Playoffs ===
Year	Team	Games		Receiving					
Year	Team	GP	GS	Tgt	Rec	Yds	Avg	Lng	TD
2002	ATL	**2**	0	**5**	**4**	**35**	**8.8**	**14**	0
Career		2	0	5	4	35	8.8	14	0
