= Jermaine Fazande =

American football player (born 1975)

No. 35
- Position: Running back

Personal information
- Born: January 14, 1975 (age 51); Marrero, Louisiana, U.S.
- Listed height: 6 ft 2 in (1.88 m)
- Listed weight: 255 lb (116 kg)

Career information
- High school: John Ehret (Marrero)
- College: Oklahoma (1994–1998)
- NFL draft: 1999: 2nd round, 60th overall pick

Career history
- San Diego Chargers (1999–2000); New England Patriots (2003)*
- * Offseason or practice squad member only

Career NFL statistics
- Rushing yards: 733
- Average: 3.5
- Touchdowns: 4
- Stats at Pro Football Reference

Jermaine Fazande (born January 14, 1975) is an American former professional football player who was a running back for the San Diego Chargers of the National Football League (NFL). He played college football for the Oklahoma Sooners and was selected by the Chargers in the second round of the 1999 NFL draft.

Fazande is currently a police officer with the Rice University Police Department in Houston, Texas.

== College career ==
Fazande attended the University of Oklahoma from 1994 to 1998 as a fullback. As a redshirt freshman in 1994, Fazande did not see the field until 1995. He rushed for a career-high 491 yards on 105 attempts and five touchdowns as a junior in 1997. Injuries, including a fractured jaw suffered during a practice in August 1998, limited Fazande to just nine games his senior season, as he rushed 42 times for just 161 yards.

Jermaine Fazande college statistics
Year	Team	Conference	Games	Rushing				Receiving				
Year	Team	Con	G	Att	Yds	Avg	TD	Rec	Yds	Avg	Lng	TD
1994	Oklahoma Sooners	Big 8	0	0	0	0.0	0	0	0	0.0	0	0
1995	Oklahoma Sooners	Big 8	11	28	112	4.0	0	0	0	0.0	0	0
1996	Oklahoma Sooners	Big 12	11	12	43	3.6	0	0	0	0.0	0	0
1997	Oklahoma Sooners	Big 12	12	105	491	4.7	5	0	0	0.0	0	0
1998	Oklahoma Sooners	Big 12	9	42	161	3.8	3	1	12	12.0	12	0
Career		–	43	187	807	4.3	8	1	12	12.0	12	0

== Professional career ==
=== San Diego Chargers ===
Fazande was drafted by the San Diego Chargers with the 60th overall pick in the second round of the 1999 NFL draft. The Chargers had acquired the draft pick in a trade with the Atlanta Falcons in May 1998 for wide receiver Tony Martin. A fullback in college, the Chargers moved him to running back, hoping to copy some success they had with Natrone Means. A backup as a rookie, he had his first big game in the final game of the season against the Denver Broncos, carrying the ball 30 times and rushing for 183 yards and the only touchdown of the game, as San Diego won 12–6. He finished his rookie campaign by leading the Chargers in rushing, carrying the ball 91 times for 365 yards and two touchdowns. Following the season, the Chargers released veteran Natrone Means, allowing for Fazande to work for a larger role the following season. In 2000, Fazande was second on the Chargers in rushing with 368 yards on 119 carries, rushing for just two touchdowns. In 2001, the Chargers with new general manager John Butler drafted hall of famer LaDainian Tomlinson, allowing the team to release Fazande at final cuts on September 3, 2001.

=== New England Patriots ===
On May 1, 2003, the New England Patriots signed Fazande. Fazande, however, never made it out of training camp with the Patriots, and never played again in the NFL.

== Professional statistics ==
Year	Team	Games		Rushing					Receiving					Fumbles	
Year	Team	G	GS	Att	Yds	Avg	Lng	TD	Rec	Yds	Avg	Lng	TD	Fmb	Lst
1999	San Diego Chargers	7	3	91	365	4.0	54	2	0	0	0.0	0	0	2	2
2000	San Diego Chargers	13	7	119	368	3.1	26	2	16	104	6.5	17	0	1	1
Career		20	10	210	733	3.5	54	4	16	104	6.5	17	0	3	3

== Personal life ==
Following his NFL career, Fazande became a police officer with the Rice University Police Department in Houston, Texas.
