= Pat Batteaux =

American football player (born 1978)

Profile
- Position: Wide receiver

Personal information
- Born: April 18, 1978 (age 48); Houston, Texas, U.S.
- Listed height: 6 ft 1 in (1.85 m)
- Listed weight: 195 lb (88 kg)

Career information
- High school: Elkins (Missouri City, Texas)
- College: TCU (1996–1999)
- NFL draft: 2000: undrafted

Career history
- San Diego Chargers (2000–2001)
- Stats at Pro Football Reference

Patrick Alan Batteaux (born April 18, 1978) is an American former professional football wide receiver who played for the San Diego Chargers of the National Football League (NFL). He played college football and college basketball at Texas Christian University.

== Early life ==
Patrick Alan Batteaux was born on April 18, 1978, in Houston, Texas. He attended Elkins High School in Missouri City, Texas.

== College career ==
Batteaux was a four-year letterman for the TCU Horned Frogs from 1996 to 1999. He was a wide receiver his first two seasons. He caught six passes for 58 yards as a freshman in 1996, and 27 passes for 396 yards and one touchdown as a sophomore in 1997. Batteaux converted to quarterback in 1998, completing 55 of 114 passes (48.2%) for 519 yards, one touchdown, and seven interceptions that season while also rushing 149 times for 479 yards and three touchdowns. In 1999, he recorded 27 completions on 52 passing attempts (51.9%) for 243 yards and four touchdowns, and 92 carries for 333 yards and two touchdowns.

Batteaux also played college basketball at TCU, appearing in three games as a guard during the 1997–98 season.

== Professional career ==
After going undrafted in the 2000 NFL draft, Batteaux signed with the San Diego Chargers on April 17, 2000. He was waived on August 20 and signed to the Chargers' practice squad on August 30, 2000. He spent the remainder of the year on the practice squad and became a free agent after the season. He re-signed with the Chargers on February 21, 2001. Batteaux was released on September 2 and signed to the practice squad on September 4. He was promoted to the active roster on November 14 and played in two games, recording one six-yard receptions on three targets, before being released on December 4. He was signed to the practice squad again on December 6 and promoted back to the active roster on December 14, 2001. Batteaux then played in the final three games of the season, catching two passes for 19 yards on five targets. He released by the Chargers on August 31, 2002.
