= Curtis Conway =

American football player (born 1971)

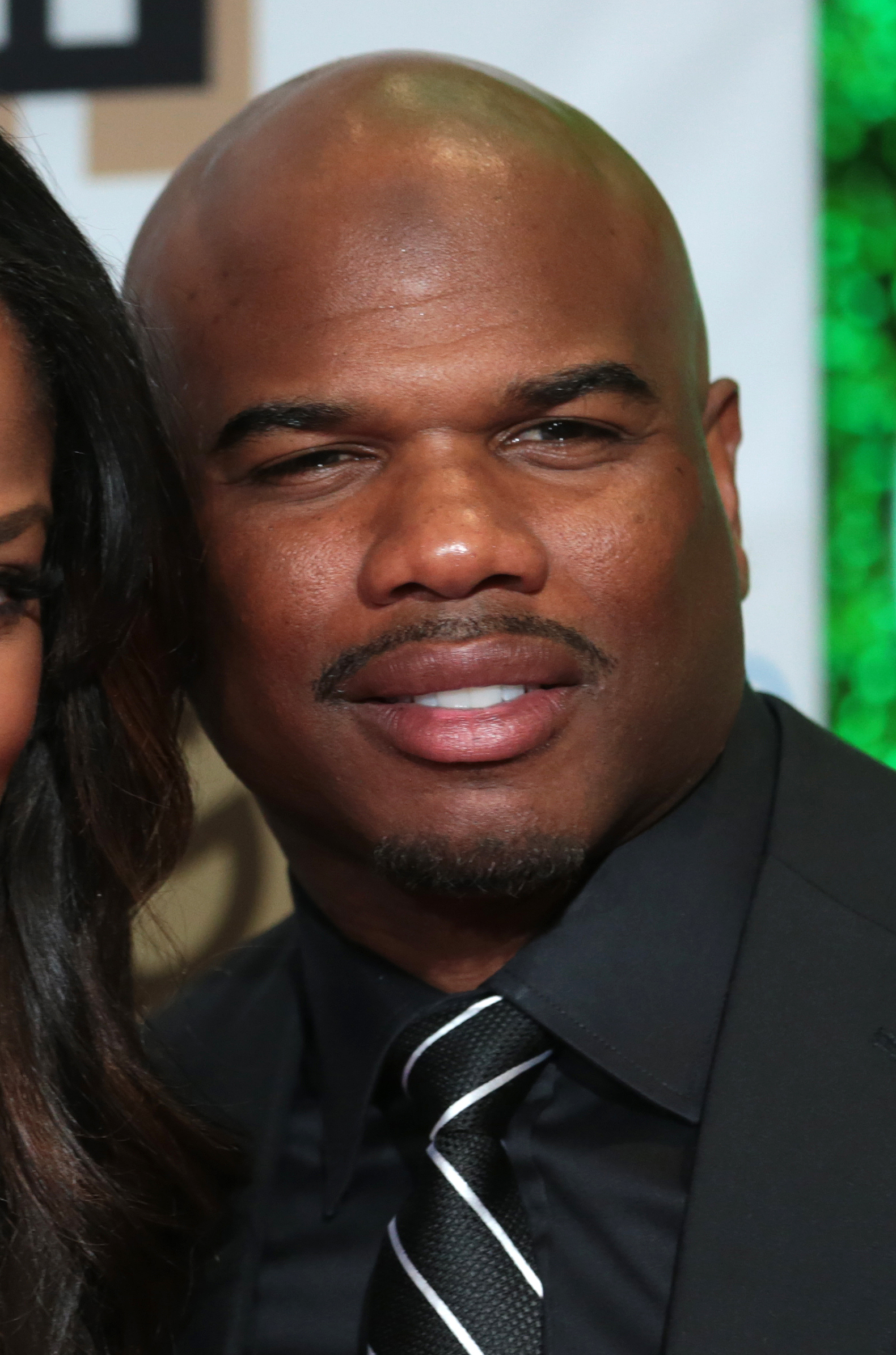
- Conway in 2017

No. 80, 81, 89
- Position: Wide receiver

Personal information
- Born: January 13, 1971 (age 55); Los Angeles, California, U.S.
- Listed height: 6 ft 1 in (1.85 m)
- Listed weight: 200 lb (91 kg)

Career information
- High school: Hawthorne (Hawthorne, California)
- College: USC
- NFL draft: 1993: 1st round, 7th overall pick

Career history
- Chicago Bears (1993–1999); San Diego Chargers (2000–2002); New York Jets (2003); San Francisco 49ers (2004)

Awards and highlights
- First-team All-American (1992); 2× First-team All-Pac-10 (1991, 1992)

Career NFL statistics
- Receptions: 594
- Receiving yards: 8,230
- Receiving touchdowns: 52
- Stats at Pro Football Reference

Curtis Lamont Conway Sr (born January 13, 1971) is an American former professional football player who was a wide receiver in the National Football League (NFL). He played college football for the USC Trojans and was selected by the Chicago Bears in the first round of the 1993 NFL draft. Conway also played in the NFL for the San Diego Chargers, New York Jets and San Francisco 49ers.

== Early life ==
Conway attended Hawthorne High School in Hawthorne, California and was a football and a track star. He won All-America honors as a senior quarterback. His high school quarterback coach was Dave Keller. His high school track coach was legendary coach Kye Courtney. Even though he was an All-American quarterback, he was more known for his exploits on the track. During that era, Hawthorne was a regular contender at the CIF California State Meet. In 1987 as a sophomore he was the anchor of the California State Record 4X100m relay team (40.24) set in the preliminaries, Hawthorne High School was DQ'd at the finals after initially finishing second. In 1988 as a junior he placed second in the 100m (10.85) and placed third 3rd in the 200m (21.30). In 1989 as a senior he won the 100m state title with the time of 10.23 and placed 2nd in the 200m (20.89).

== College career ==
Prior to USC, Conway attended El Camino Junior College in Torrance, California, but did not play. He went to USC as a quarterback but converted to wide receiver in 1991.

During his 1990 USC season, Conway made 26 kick returns for 555 yards, 12 punt returns for 161 yards and one touchdown. The next year during the 1991 season, Conway made 21 catches for 240 yards and one touchdown, 18 carries for 29 yards and one touchdown, 20 kick returns for 493 yards and 24 punt returns for 172 yards. In 1992, Conway's season included making 49 catches for 764 yards and 5 touchdowns, 6 carries for 37 yards and one touchdown, 27 kick returns for 675 yards and one touchdown, 31 punt returns for 346 yards and one touchdown.

Conway was also an All-American sprinter for the USC Trojans track and field team, finishing runner-up on their 4 × 400 meters relay at the 1992 NCAA Division I Outdoor Track and Field Championships alongside Travis Hannah, Martin Cannady, and Quincy Watts.

== Professional career ==
Pre-draft measurables
Height	Weight	Arm length	Hand span
6 ft 0 1/4 in (1.84 m)	185 lb (84 kg)	31 1/2 in (0.80 m)	8 3/4 in (0.22 m)

He had over 1,000 yards three times in his twelve-year NFL career, in which he played for the Chicago Bears, the San Diego Chargers, the New York Jets and the San Francisco 49ers.

During his twelve years in the NFL, Conway threw for two touchdown passes, a rarity for the wide receiver position. The most notable of the two came during a game against the Miami Dolphins on November 13, 1994. Conway lined up split off of and parallel to the holder, on a bizarre field goal formation. Rather than the snap being taken by Erik Kramer, Conway received it, and threw a pass which was tipped up into the air by a Dolphins' defender and caught by fellow Bears' teammate and tight end Keith Jennings, who ran into the endzone for a touchdown. His 329 catches during his tenure with the Bears (1993–1999) place him 4th in franchise history on their all-time receptions list, and his 4,498 receiving yards rank him 6th on the Bears’ all-time yardage list. He also was the 1st Chicago Bears receiver to record back to back 1000 yard seasons.

== NFL career statistics ==
Year	Team	GP	Rec	Yards	Avg	Lng	TD	FD	Fum	Lost
1993	CHI	16	19	231	12.2	38	2	11	0	0
1994	CHI	13	39	546	14.0	85	2	28	0	0
1995	CHI	16	62	1,037	16.7	76	12	47	0	0
1996	CHI	16	81	1,049	13.0	58	7	51	1	0
1997	CHI	7	30	476	15.9	55	1	18	0	0
1998	CHI	15	54	733	13.6	47	3	36	1	1
1999	CHI	9	44	426	9.7	30	4	23	2	1
2000	SD	14	53	712	13.4	68	5	31	0	0
2001	SD	16	71	1,125	15.8	72	6	52	1	1
2002	SD	13	57	852	14.9	52	5	42	2	2
2003	NYJ	16	46	640	13.9	45	2	33	0	0
2004	SF	16	38	403	10.6	37	3	23	0	0
Career		167	594	8,230	13.9	85	52	395	7	5

== Broadcasting ==
Beginning in 2009, Conway began working as a color analyst on national NFL radio broadcasts by Compass Media Networks. He teamed with Lee "Hacksaw" Hamilton and Gregg "Free Beer" Daniels on play-by-play. He is currently a studio analyst for the Pac-12 Network and a cohost of Total Access on the NFL Network. He joined the San Diego Chargers network for the 2015 season as a studio analyst.

== Personal life ==
On July 23, 2007, Conway married female boxing champ Laila Ali, the daughter of Muhammad Ali.
