= Billings Police Department =

Law enforcement agency in Billings, Montana

Coordinates: 45.783757°N 108.505902°W

City of Billings Police Department
- Abbreviation: BPD

Operational structure
- Headquarters: Billings, Montana, United States

Facilities
- Zones: 9
- Patrol cars: Ford Crown Victoria, Ford Taurus, Ford Utility Interceptor and Pursuit Interceptor, Ford F150
- K-9 Units: Belgian Malinois and Dutch Shepherd

Website
- https://www.billingsmt.gov/2882/Police

The Billings Police Department (BPD) is the primary law enforcement agency in Billings, Montana. It is the largest city police force in Montana with 177 sworn officers & 80 civilian employees covering 41 square miles (110 km^{2}) and a population of about 122,000. The city is divided into four police response zones, which are subdivided into 9 police beats. Organizationally the department is broken up into the Operations (Patrol) Division and the Investigations Division. Specialized units include Special Weapons and Tactics Team (SWAT), Drone Unit, Hostage Negotiators & a Bomb Unit.

== Rank structure and insignia ==
Title	Description	Insignia
Chief of Police	The Chief of Police is the overall person in charge of leading the department.	
Assistant Chief	Appointed by the Chief of Police.	
Captain	Appointment by the Chief of Police. Division Head commander	
Lieutenant	Promotion based on a written examination and panel interview/departmental assessment.	
Sergeant	Promotion based on a written examination and panel interview/departmental assessment.	
Detective	Permanently assigned position based on a written examination and panel interview/departmental assessment.	
Police Officer	Patrol Officers employed by the City of Billings	

=== History ===
Before the Billings Police Department was established, most of the law enforcing was done by the sheriffs office or by vigilantes. The Billings Police Department was established in 1902 with about 10 Police officers on duty. Most of their jobs were shutting down red light districts and patrolling the streets. As the city grew, so did their responsibilities.

=== Controversies & Misconduct ===
In 2001, the Billings Police Department settled a Racial profiling case for $50,000 with the ACLU.

Some 28 current and former Billing Police officers filed a lawsuit in January 2009 claiming that the city miscalculated their pay, possibly dating as far back as 1994.

In October 2012, members of a city/county SWAT deployed a flash grenade in a home they were raiding. The device went off and burned a twelve-year-old girl. Although the team was looking for a drug-manufacturing lab, they found nothing and made no arrests. The child was treated at a local hospital.

In April 2014, Billings Police officer, Grant Morrison, shot and killed 38 year old Richard Ramirez during a traffic stop in an alley between Fifth Ave. S. and State Ave. A coroner's inquest found Morrison was justified in the shooting, however the Ramirez family later filed a wrongful death lawsuit which the City of Billings settled with them for $550,000 in lieu of going to trial in a civil case.

In April 2018, three Billings police officers were disciplined for having sex on city property.

=== Officer-Involved Shootings ===
In May 2022, Billings Police officers were involved in shooting and killing 36-year-old resident Curtis Yellowtail, after Yellowtail reportedly assaulted a woman, and then led law enforcement on a high-speed chase which ended near 14th St. West and Industrial Ave.

On May 31, 2022, a total of 13 officers shot and killed 19-year-old Michael Morado after Morado reportedly fired at officers first.

In August 2022, Billings Police officer, Ryland Nelson, reportedly shot a 22-year-old male one time in the abdomen. The police department did not release the identity of the suspect, Darrien Snow, until over 13 months later, in September 2023.

=== Chiefs ===
- Ronald (Ron) Tussing - 1997 to 2005
- Richard (Rich) St. John - 2005 to present

=== Line of Duty Deaths ===
- Sergeant Robert T Hannah (EOW - July 2, 1904)
- Policeman Enos Nelson (EOW - December 17, 1917)
- Patrolman Arthur D. Pettit (EOW - December 23, 1935)
- Detective Alexander F. Mavity (EOW - February 14, 1989)

== See also ==
- List of law enforcement agencies in Montana
