= Ben Coleman (American football) =

American football player (born 1971)

No. 62
- Positions: Guard, tackle

Personal information
- Born: May 18, 1971 (age 55); South Hill, Virginia, U.S.
- Listed height: 6 ft 5 in (1.96 m)
- Listed weight: 330 lb (150 kg)

Career information
- High school: South Hill (VA) Park View
- College: Wake Forest
- NFL draft: 1993: 2nd round, 32nd overall pick

Career history
- Phoenix/Arizona Cardinals (1993–1995); Jacksonville Jaguars (1995–1999); San Diego Chargers (2000); Washington Redskins (2001)

Awards and highlights
- First-team All-American (1992); First-team All-ACC (1992)

Career NFL statistics
- Games played: 135
- Games started: 104
- Fumble recoveries: 1
- Stats at Pro Football Reference

Benjamin Leon Coleman (born May 18, 1971) is an American former professional football player who was an offensive lineman in the National Football League (NFL). He played college football for the Wake Forest Demon Deacons and was selected in the second round of the 1993 NFL draft by the Phoenix/Arizona Cardinals. He later played for the Jacksonville Jaguars, San Diego Chargers, and the Washington Redskins before retiring in 2001. His son, also named Ben, is an offensive guard for Arizona State University.

Pre-draft measurables
Height	Weight	Arm length	Hand span	40-yard dash	10-yard split	20-yard split	20-yard shuttle	Vertical jump	Broad jump	Bench press
6 ft 4 5/8 in (1.95 m)	331 lb (150 kg)	36 1/4 in (0.92 m)	9 3/8 in (0.24 m)	5.33 s	1.85 s	3.04 s	4.99 s	27.5 in (0.70 m)	8 ft 4 in (2.54 m)	22 reps

== Personal life ==
While a member of the Jaguars, Coleman was the owner of several franchise locations of Cold Stone Creamery in the Jacksonville area.
