= Jason Thomas (American football) =

American football player (born 1977)

No. 65, 81
- Position: Offensive lineman

Personal information
- Born: July 10, 1977 (age 49); Savannah, Georgia, U.S.
- Listed height: 6 ft 4 in (1.93 m)
- Listed weight: 325 lb (147 kg)

Career information
- High school: Beach (Savannah)
- College: Hampton
- NFL draft: 2000: 7th round, 222nd overall pick

Career history
- San Diego Chargers (2000–2001); Baltimore Ravens (2001–2003); Miami Dolphins (2005)*; Buffalo Bills (2006)*; San Jose SaberCats (2008)
- * Offseason or practice squad member only
- Stats at Pro Football Reference
- Stats at ArenaFan.com

Jason Thomas (born July 10, 1977) is an American former professional football offensive lineman who played for the Baltimore Ravens of the National Football League (NFL). He played college football for the South Carolina Gamecocks and Hampton Pirates, and was selected by the San Diego Chargers in the seventh round of the 2000 NFL draft.

== Early life ==
Jason Thomas was born on July 10, 1977, in Savannah, Georgia. He attended Beach High School in Savannah.

== College career ==
Thomas enrolled at the University of South Carolina to play college football for the Gamecocks. He redshirted the 1995 season and played for the varsity team in 1996. He then transferred to play for the Pirates of Hampton University from 1997 to 1999. Thomas earned All-Mid-Eastern Athletic Conference honors in 1998 and 1999 and NCAA Division I-AA All-American recognition in 1999. He graduated from Hampton in December 1999 with a sports management degree.

== Professional career ==
After going undrafted in the 2000 NFL draft, Thomas signed with the San Diego Chargers on April 16, 2000. He signed a three-year contract with the team on July 19. He was released on August 27 and signed to the Chargers' practice squad on August 29. Thomas was promoted to the active roster on December 22, 2000, but did not play in any games during the 2000 season. He was released on September 2, 2001, and signed to the practice squad on September 4.

On November 20, 2001, Thomas was signed to the Baltimore Ravens' active roster of the Chargers' practice squad. However, he did not appear in any games during the 2001 season. He played in 13 games in 2002 in a reserve role. Thomas also played in the 2003 regular season opener in a backup role before being released on September 8, 2003.

On February 15, 2005, Thomas signed with the Miami Dolphins. He was released on September 3, 2005, before the start of the regular season.

Thomas was signed by the Buffalo Bills on January 6, 2006. He was released on September 2, 2006.

On April 10, 2008, Thomas signed with the San Jose SaberCats of the Arena Football League (AFL) during mid-season. The SaberCats advanced to ArenaBowl XXII but lost to the Philadelphia Soul by a score of 59–56.

== Personal life ==
Thomas previously served as an assistant line coach for the Morgan State Bears.
