= 2001 San Diego Chargers season =

NFL team 42nd season

- Owner: Alex Spanos
- General manager: John Butler
- Head coach: Mike Riley
- Home stadium: Qualcomm Stadium

Results
- Record: 5–11
- Division place: 5th AFC West
- Playoffs: Did not qualify
- All-Pros: 1: DE Marcellus Wiley (2nd team)
- Pro Bowlers: 4: S Rodney Harrison; CB Ryan McNeil; LB Junior Seau; DE Marcellus Wiley

The 2001 San Diego Chargers season was the franchise's 32nd season in the National Football League (NFL) and the 42nd overall and the third and final season under head coach Mike Riley. The team improved on their 1–15 record in 2000 to finish 5–11 but missed the playoffs for the 6th straight year. It was Mike Riley's final season as the team's head coach. At the end of the season running back LaDainian Tomlinson nearly won the Offensive Rookie of the Year award. Despite going 5–11 after losing their final nine games of the season, eight of the Chargers' losses were by less than a touchdown, five of them were by three points, and three of them were by ten points. In their 11 losses, they lost by 61 points total.

== Offseason ==
Additions	Subtractions
QB Doug Flutie (Bills)	QB Ryan Leaf (Buccaneers/Cowboys)
LB Sam Rogers (Bills)	G Ben Coleman (Redskins)
LB John Holecek (Bills)	K John Carney (Saints)
DE Marcellus Wiley (Bills)	S Mike Dumas (Bears)
K Steve Christie (Bills)	QB Jim Harbaugh (Lions)
WR Tim Dwight (Falcons)	
CB Alex Molden (Saints)	
T Ed Ellis (Redskins)	
K Wade Richey (49ers)	
CB Ryan McNeil (Cowboys)	

=== Becoming the "Bills West" ===
In December 2000, Buffalo Bills owner Ralph Wilson fired his general manager, John Butler, and his entire staff. The Chargers immediately signed Butler, and within weeks, Butler had cut several players from the roster including troubled quarterback Ryan Leaf, and lured several recognizable names from the 2000 Bills team: defensive end Marcellus Wiley, linebackers Sam Rogers and John Holecek, kicker Steve Christie and most notably, quarterback Doug Flutie, who had been cut by the Bills in a bitter quarterback controversy involving Rob Johnson. With so many former Bills connections, the team was often referred to as the "Bills West". (See also the 1995 Carolina Panthers season, in which Bill Polian brought several Bills contributors from the team's Super Bowl era to Carolina in its inaugural year of play.)

As such, the October 28 matchup between the Bills and Chargers in San Diego was heavily promoted as a dual grudge match, not just between Johnson and Flutie, but also between Wilson and Butler, with Wilson having been quoted as wanting to win the Chargers game more than the Super Bowl. Despite the fact that the Bills were having a very bad season, and the Chargers' fortunes (at the time) had turned significantly, the game was very competitive, coming down to the final minutes play. Trailing 24–20, Flutie scrambled 13 yards to put the Chargers up 27–24; when kicker Jake Arians attempted a 44-yard field goal to tie the game, it was blocked. The Chargers, then 5–2, would not win another game the entire season, going 0–9 in the remaining nine games.

=== NFL draft ===
Michael Vick was selected in the 2001 NFL draft as the first overall pick and first African American quarterback taken number 1 in the NFL draft. The San Diego Chargers had the number one selection spot in the draft that year but traded the rights to the first overall choice to the Atlanta Falcons a day before the draft, for which they received the Falcons' first round pick (5th overall) and third round pick in 2001 (used to draft CB Tay Cody), a second round pick in 2002 (used to draft WR Reche Caldwell) and WR/KR Tim Dwight. With the Chargers' downgraded spot (the 5th overall), they selected Texas Christian University running back LaDainian Tomlinson, who went on to become league MVP in 2006. Although Vick has never become league MVP, he finished second in voting in 2004. In this way, Tomlinson and Vick are linked as having been "traded" for each other, although the transaction was actually the result of traded draft picks and contract negotiations. The Chargers' other notable draft pick was Drew Brees, who would eventually win Super Bowl XLIV as a member of the Saints.

2001 San Diego Chargers draft
Round	Pick	Player	Position	College	Notes
1	5	LaDainian Tomlinson * ^{†}	RB	TCU	Pick from ATL
2	32	Drew Brees * ^{†}	QB	Purdue	
3	67	Tay Cody	CB	Florida St	Pick from ATL
4	112	Carlos Polk	LB	Nebraska	Pick from PIT
5	132	Elliot Silvers	OT	Washington	
5	139	Zeke Moreno	ILB	USC	Pick from New England Patriots
7	201	Brandon Gorin	OT	Purdue	
7	244	Robert Carswell	Defensive back	Clemson	
Made roster † Pro Football Hall of Fame * Made at least one Pro Bowl during career

=== Undrafted free agents ===
2001 undrafted free agents of note
Player	Position	College
Justin Amman	Guard	Florida State
Kecalf Bailey	Cornerback	Alabama
Walter Bernard	Cornerback	New Mexico
Carey Clayton	Center	UTEP
Robert Ellis	Tight end	Boston College
Dondre Gilliam	Wide receiver	Millersville
Troy Grant	Defensive back	Tennessee Tech
Bart Hendricks	Quarterback	Boise State
Michael Keathley	Guard	TCU
Marty Maurer	Tight end	Oregon State
Rob Pate	Safety	Auburn
Titcus Pettigrew	Safety	Penn State
DeRonnie Pitts	Wide receiver	Stanford
Brad Rekuc	Linebacker	Weber State
Scott Schultz	Defensive tackle	North Dakota
DeQuincy Scott	Defensive end	Southern Miss
Mukala Sikyala	Running back	Maryland
Tim Stuber	Tackle	Colorado State
Nate Turner	Wide receiver	UNLV
Terry Witherspoon	Fullback	Clemson

== Personnel ==
=== Staff ===
2001 San Diego Chargers staff
Front office: Chairman of the board – Alex Spanos; President/chief executive officer – Dean Spanos; Executive vice president – Michael Spanos; Executive vice president/general manager – John Butler; Assistant general manager/director of pro personnel – A. J. Smith; Vice president of football operations – Ed McGuire; Director of player personnel – Buddy Nix; Director of college scouting – Jimmy Raye; Head coaches: Head coach – Mike Riley; Offensive coaches: Offensive coordinator – Norv Turner; Quarterbacks – Mike Johnson; Running backs – Ollie Wilson; Wide receivers – Mike Sanford; Tight ends – Paul Chryst; Offensive line – Joe Bugel; Offensive assistant/quality control – Craig Dickenson	Defensive coaches: Defensive coordinator – Joe Pascale; Defensive line – Wayne Nunnely; Linebackers – Jim Vechiarella; Secondary – Rod Perry; Defensive corners – Mark Banker; Defensive assistant/quality control – Andrew McClave; Special teams coaches: Special teams – Bruce Read; Special teams assistant/quality control – Craig Dickenson; Strength and conditioning: Strength and conditioning – John Hastings; Assistant strength and conditioning – Mike Schleelein

=== Roster ===
2001 San Diego Chargers roster
Quarterbacks (QB): 9 Drew Brees; 15 Dave Dickenson; 7 Doug Flutie; Running backs (RB): 41 Terrell Fletcher; 40 Derrick Harris FB; 28 Ronney Jenkins KR; 44 Fred McCrary FB; 24 Glyn Milburn PR; 21 LaDainian Tomlinson; Wide receivers (WR): 86 Pat Batteaux; 80 Curtis Conway; 85 Tim Dwight PR; 82 Trevor Gaylor; 81 Jeff Graham; 6 Nate Turner; Tight ends (TE): 83 Steve Heiden; 88 Freddie Jones; 84 Josh Whitman	Offensive linemen (OL): 69 Ed Ellis T; 73 Brandon Gorin T; 71 DeMingo Graham G; 64 Kendyl Jacox C; 61 Michael Keathley G; 77 Damion McIntosh T; 70 Vaughn Parker T; 74 Raleigh Roundtree G; 68 Elliot Silvers T; Defensive linemen (DL): 96 Leonardo Carson DT; 90 Adrian Dingle DE/DT; 95 Albert Fontenot DE; 99 Raylee Johnson DE; 98 Mike Mohring DT; 97 John Parrella DT; 75 Marcellus Wiley DE	Linebackers (LB): 51 Gerald Dixon OLB; 53 Deon Humphrey OLB; 57 Zeke Moreno MLB; 59 Sam Rogers OLB; 56 Orlando Ruff MLB; 55 Junior Seau OLB; Defensive backs (DB): 42 Rogers Beckett S; 30 Robert Carswell SS; 27 Tay Cody CB; 22 Lloyd Harrison CB; 37 Rodney Harrison SS; 47 Ryan McNeil CB; 31 Jason Perry FS; 33 Davis Sanchez CB; 29 Scott Turner CB; Special teams (ST): 2 Darren Bennett P; 50 David Binn LS; 8 Steve Christie K; 5 Wade Richey K	Reserve: 67 Roman Fortin C (IR); 52 John Holecek LB (IR); 25 Alex Molden CB (IR); 93 Carlos Polk LB (IR); 94 Maa Tanuvasa DT (IR); 76 Jamal Williams DT (IR); Rookies in italics 53 active, 6 reserve

== Preseason ==
Week	Date	Opponent	Result	Record	Venue	Attendance	Recap
1	August 11	San Francisco 49ers	W 25–24	1–0	Qualcomm Stadium	45,155	Recap
2	August 18	at Miami Dolphins	W 23–20 (OT)	2–0	Pro Player Stadium	58,854	Recap
3	August 25	St. Louis Rams	W 13–10 (OT)	3–0	Qualcomm Stadium	53,700	Recap
4	August 31	at Arizona Cardinals	L 3–16	3–1	Sun Devil Stadium	27,301	Recap

== Regular season ==
=== Schedule ===
Week	Date	Opponent	Result	Record	Venue	Attendance
1	September 9	Washington Redskins	**W** 30–3	1–0	Qualcomm Stadium	60,629
2	September 23	at Dallas Cowboys	**W** 32–21	2–0	Texas Stadium	63,430
3	September 30	Cincinnati Bengals	**W** 28–14	3–0	Qualcomm Stadium	56,048
4	October 7	at Cleveland Browns	**L** 16–20	3–1	Cleveland Browns Stadium	73,018
5	October 14	at New England Patriots	**L** 26–29 (OT)	3–2	Foxboro Stadium	60,292
6	October 21	**Denver Broncos**	**W** 27–10	4–2	Qualcomm Stadium	67,521
7	October 28	Buffalo Bills	**W** 27–24	5–2	Qualcomm Stadium	63,698
8	November 4	**Kansas City Chiefs**	**L** 20–25	5–3	Qualcomm Stadium	58,789
9	November 11	at **Denver Broncos**	**L** 16–26	5–4	Invesco Field	74,951
10	November 18	at **Oakland Raiders**	**L** 24–34	5–5	Network Associates Coliseum	61,960
11	November 25	Arizona Cardinals	**L** 17–20	5–6	Qualcomm Stadium	49,398
12	December 2	at **Seattle Seahawks**	**L** 10–13 (OT)	5–7	Husky Stadium	55,466
13	December 9	at Philadelphia Eagles	**L** 14–24	5–8	Veterans Stadium	65,438
14	December 15	**Oakland Raiders**	**L** 6–13	5–9	Qualcomm Stadium	67,349
15	December 23	at **Kansas City Chiefs**	**L** 17–20	5–10	Arrowhead Stadium	76,131
16	December 30	**Seattle Seahawks**	**L** 22–25	5–11	Qualcomm Stadium	51,412
17	Bye					
Note: Intra-division opponents are in **bold** text.

=== Game summaries ===
==== Week 1: vs. Washington Redskins ====
Week 1: Washington Redskins at San Diego Chargers – Game summary

Quarter	1	2	3	4	Total
Redskins	0	0	3	0	**3**
**Chargers**	10	10	0	10	**30**

at Qualcomm Stadium, San Diego, California

- Date: September 9
- Game time: 1:15 p.m. PDT
- Game weather: Clear, 68 °F (20 °C)
- Game attendance: 60,629
- Referee: Jim Sprenger
- TV announcers (Fox): Kenny Albert, Tim Green and Dyrol Joyner
- Box score, Game Book

Game information

**First quarter**

- SDG – Tim Dwight 84-yard punt return (Wade Richey kick), 11:31. Chargers 7–0.
- SDG – Wade Richey 21-yard field goal, 3:47. Chargers 10–0. **Drive: 11 plays, 62 yards, 5:35.**

**Second quarter**

- SDG – LaDainian Tomlinson 3-yard run (Wade Richey kick), 9:04. Chargers 17–0. **Drive: 6 plays, 45 yards, 3:07.**
- SDG – Wade Richey 48-yard field goal, 0:34. Chargers 20–0. **Drive: 4 plays, 9 yards, 2:09.**

**Third quarter**

- WAS – Brett Conway 40-yard field goal, 0:36. Chargers 20–3. **Drive: 4 plays, -6 yards, 1:01.**

**Fourth quarter**

- SDG – Wade Richey 32-yard field goal, 10:38. Chargers 23–3. **Drive: 11 plays, 45 yards, 4:58.**
- SDG – LaDainian Tomlinson 1-yard run (Wade Richey kick), 4:16. Chargers 30–3. **Drive: 8 plays, 60 yards, 5:20.**

**Top passers**

- WAS – Jeff George – 8/18, 66 yards, 2 INT
- SDG – Doug Flutie – 10/18, 129 yards, 2 INT

**Top rushers**

- WAS – Stephen Davis – 14 rushes, 35 yards
- SDG – LaDainian Tomlinson – 36 rushes, 113 yards, 2 TD

**Top receivers**

- WAS – Rod Gardner – 5 receptions, 37 yards
- SDG – Curtis Conway – 3 receptions, 36 yards

Both teams opened with a three-and-out. When Washington punted, Dwight took the ball at his own 16 and profited from good blocking as he wove to the left sideline and completed an 84-yard touchdown without being touched. Dwight and Conway caught passes of 17 and 24 yards from Flutie on back-to-back plays on the next Charger drive, setting up a field goal. When Tomlinson scored his first career touchdown after a short drive in the 2nd quarter, it was 17–0 without Washington having crossed midfield. They did reach a 1st and 10 at the Charger 46 on the following drive, but Jeff George's long pass was then intercepted in the end zone by Alex Molden. Richey's second field goal was set up by a 15-yard Dwight punt return.

Five of the first eight possessions after halftime resulted in turnovers. John Parrella recovered a George fumble in Washington territory, but Flutie was intercepted three plays later. After three punts, Tomlinson fumbled in his own territory, and Washington reached the San Diego 1 yard line before Seau forced a fumble that Rodney Harrison recovered. Two plays later, Conway lost a fumble, setting up the only Washington points of the game. The Chargers responded with Richey's third field goal on their next drive and concluded the scoring when Dwight drew a 34-yard defensive pass interference penalty in the end zone, and Tomlinson scored again two plays later.

The San Diego defense gave up 161 yards, which would be comfortably their best total of the season; both teams committed four turnovers.. Tomlinson's 36 carries were tied for the third-most in Charger history at the time, while his 113 yards rushing yards remain a record for a Charger on debut as of 2022. Both teams' head coaches (Riley and Marty Schottenheimer) would be sacked at the end of the season, with Schottenheimer taking over the San Diego job.

==== Week 2: at Dallas Cowboys ====
Week 2: San Diego Chargers at Dallas Cowboys – Game summary

Quarter	1	2	3	4	Total
**Chargers**	14	6	6	6	**32**
Cowboys	0	14	0	7	**21**

at Texas Stadium, Irving, Texas

- Date: September 23
- Game time: 12:00 p.m. CDT
- Game weather: Partly Cloudy and Hazy, 84 °F (29 °C)
- Game attendance: 63,430
- Referee: Jeff Triplette
- TV announcers (CBS): Kevin Harlan, Craig James and Beasley Reece
- Box score, Game Book

Game information

**First quarter**

- SDG – Freddie Jones 11-yard pass from Doug Flutie (Wade Richey kick), 10:23. Chargers 7–0. **Drive: 9 plays, 38 yards, 3:48.**
- SDG – Curtis Conway 7-yard pass from Doug Flutie (Wade Richey kick), 3:43. Chargers 14–0. **Drive: 10 plays, 48 yards, 5:39.**

**Second quarter**

- SDG – Wade Richey 22-yard field goal, 13:30. Chargers 17–0. **Drive: 5 plays, 39 yards, 1:42.**
- DAL – Rocket Ismail 80-yard pass from Anthony Wright (Tim Seder kick), 13:12. Chargers 17–7. **Drive: 1 play, 80 yards, 0:18.**
- SDG – Wade Richey 24-yard field goal, 3:55. Chargers 20–7. **Drive: 7 plays, 85 yards, 3:03.**
- DAL – Wane McGarity 11-yard pass from Anthony Wright (Tim Seder kick), 1:01. Chargers 20–14. **Drive: 7 plays, 70 yards, 2:54.**

**Third quarter**

- SDG – Tim Dwight 16-yard run (pass failed), 6:55. Chargers 26–14. **Drive: 10 plays, 83 yards, 5:45.**

**Fourth quarter**

- SDG – Wade Richey 23-yard field goal, 12:53. Chargers 29–14. **Drive: 11 plays, 81 yards, 5:00.**
- DAL – Mike Lucky 7-yard pass from Anthony Wright (Tim Seder kick), 9:21. Chargers 29–21. **Drive: 7 plays, 77 yards, 3:32.**
- SDG – Wade Richey 43-yard field goal, 1:09. Chargers 32–21. **Drive: 7 plays, 9 yards, 1:26.**

**Top passers**

- SDG – Doug Flutie – 23/38, 348 yards, 2 TD
- DAL – Anthony Wright – 12/25, 193 yards, 3 TD, 3 INT

**Top rushers**

- SDG – LaDainian Tomlinson – 27 rushes, 90 yards
- DAL – Emmitt Smith – 17 rushes, 85 yards

**Top receivers**

- SDG – Jeff Graham – 6 receptions, 94 yards
- DAL – Rocket Ismail – 2 receptions, 83 yards, TD

Jamal Williams recovered a mishandled snap at the Dallas 38 on the game's second play. The Cowboys extended the ensuing Charger drive with a penalty on a successful Richey field goal, and Flutie converted 3rd downs with completions to Dwight and Freddie Jones, the latter for a touchdown. After a Dallas three-and-out and a short punt, San Diego again took over in opposition territory, and Flutie again converted two 3rd downs, this time with completions to Graham, and Conway for the touchdown. McNeil intercepted Anthony Wright late in the 1st quarter and lateralled to Harrison, who ran the ball back to the Dallas 43; this time the Chargers added a field goal to lead 17–0 after three possessions each. The Charger defense were beaten by a deep pass on the game's following play, Rocket Ismail catching Wright's pass at the San Diego 25 en route to an 80-yard touchdown. San Diego almost returned the favor later in the half – on 3rd and 4 at the Charger 15, Dwight caught Flutie's pass over the middle at the Dallas 45 and reached the 7 yard line before being tackled for a gain of 78. The Chargers had to settle for another field goal, and Dallas pulled back within six points on their following drive.

Graham gained 34 yards on a flea-flicker on the opening play of the second half, but Tomlinson lost a fumble the play after. The Cowboys were forced to punt, and San Diego drove for another touchdown, Dwight taking an end-around to the left and dodging between tacklers near the sideline before completing a 16-yard touchdown. Conway's 36-yard catch was the biggest play on the drive for Richey's third field goal, after which Wright threw his third touchdown with nine minutes to play. Leading by eight points, San Diego then took six minutes off the clock, but Richey was wide right from 43 yards with a chance to make the game safe. Dallas advanced to their own 43 before McNeil made his second interception of the game and returned the ball 33 yards to the Dallas 34. San Diego had one more scare when Tomlinson fumbled again, but Kendyl Jacox recovered, and Richey hit the clinching field goal soon afterwards.

San Diego dominated several statistical categories, with 475 offensive yards to 289, 5 takeaways to 1, and 26 first downs to 14. Their time of possession was a second short of 38 minutes. The 475 yards of offense were the highest for San Diego since 1986.

==== Week 3: vs. Cincinnati Bengals ====
Week 3: Cincinnati Bengals at San Diego Chargers – Game summary

Quarter	1	2	3	4	Total
Bengals	0	7	0	7	**14**
**Chargers**	0	7	14	7	**28**

at Qualcomm Stadium, San Diego, California

- Date: September 30
- Game time: 1:15 p.m. PDT
- Game weather: Clear and Sunny, 78 °F (26 °C)
- Game attendance: 56,048
- Referee: Dick Hantak
- TV announcers (CBS): Bill Macatee, Trevor Matich and Scott Kaplan
- Box score, Game Book

Game information

**First quarter**

- No scoring plays

**Second quarter**

- SDG – Curtis Conway 19-yard pass from Doug Flutie (Wade Richey kick), 10:43. Chargers 7–0. **Drive: 6 plays, 41 yards, 3:18.**
- CIN – Chad Johnson 8-yard pass from Jon Kitna (Neil Rackers kick), 0:24. Tied 7–7. **Drive: 9 plays, 47 yards, 3:05.**

**Third quarter**

- SDG – LaDainian Tomlinson 4-yard run (Wade Richey kick), 8:01. Chargers 14–7. **Drive: 9 plays, 55 yards, 4:28.**
- SDG – LaDainian Tomlinson 2-yard run (Wade Richey kick), 4:44. Chargers 21–7. **Drive: 6 plays, 40 yards, 2:57.**

**Fourth quarter**

- SDG – LaDainian Tomlinson 3-yard run (Wade Richey kick), 14:15. Chargers 28–7. **Drive: 6 plays, 59 yards, 3:03.**
- CIN – Peter Warrick 7-yard pass from Jon Kitna (Neil Rackers kick), 1:48. Chargers 28–14. **Drive: 6 plays, 64 yards, 1:12.**

**Top passers**

- CIN – Jon Kitna – 18/32, 135 yards, 2 TD, 3 INT
- SDG – Doug Flutie – 12/19, 133 yards, TD

**Top rushers**

- CIN – Corey Dillon – 15 rushes, 46 yards
- SDG – LaDainian Tomlinson – 21 rushes, 107 yards, 3 TD

**Top receivers**

- CIN – Peter Warrick – 4 receptions, 31 yards, TD
- SDG – Curtis Conway – 4 receptions, 49 yards, TD
  SDG – Jeff Graham – 3 receptions, 49 yards

McNeil intercepted Jon Kitna late in the 1st quarter, leading to a Richey field goal that was wide left from 38 yards. Seau produced another interception two plays later, this time leading to a touchdown; Flutie enjoyed excellent protection before finding Conway ahead of his markers in the end zone. Cincinnati levelled the score shortly before halftime with Chad Johnson's first career touchdown catch.

After both teams punted on their first possession of the second half, Graham got the Chargers over midfield with a 28-yard catch on 3rd and 7, leading to Tomlinson's first touchdown. Harrison forced a Corey Dillon fumble on the next play from scrimmage, with Rogers Beckett recovering. Tomlinson started the ensuing drive with back-to-back carries of 10 and 13 yards, and finished it by going around left end for another touchdown. Cincinnati went three-and-out, and Tomlinson had gains of 23, 19, 4 and 3 yards, the last of these for his third touchdown in as many possessions. The Bengals were able to recover an onside kick after their late touchdown, but McNeil intercepted Kitna again on the next play.

It was McNeil's fifth interception of the season, leading the league at that point. Tomlinson was the first Charger to rush for three touchdowns since Natrone Means in 1994.

==== Week 4: at Cleveland Browns ====
Week 4: San Diego Chargers at Cleveland Browns – Game summary

Quarter	1	2	3	4	Total
Chargers	3	0	7	6	**16**
**Browns**	0	10	0	10	**20**

at Cleveland Browns Stadium, Cleveland, Ohio

- Date: October 7
- Game time: 1:00 p.m. EDT
- Game weather: Sunny/Clouds, 45 °F (7 °C)
- Game attendance: 73,018
- Referee: Walt Coleman
- TV announcers (CBS): Don Criqui, Steve Tasker and Marcus Allen
- Box score, Game Book

Game information

**First quarter**

- SDG – Wade Richey 22-yard field goal, 3:16. Chargers 3–0. **Drive: 10 plays, 51 yards, 6:15.**

**Second quarter**

- CLE – Phil Dawson 31-yard field goal, 14:30. Tied 3–3. **Drive: 10 plays, 45 yards, 3:46.**
- CLE – James Jackson 12-yard run (Phil Dawson kick), 0:33. Browns 10–3. **Drive: 15 plays, 86 yards, 8:00.**

**Third quarter**

- SDG – LaDainian Tomlinson 2-yard run (Wade Richey kick), 13:53. Tied 10–10. **Drive: 3 plays, 68 yards, 1:07.**

**Fourth quarter**

- SDG – Wade Richey 21-yard field goal, 10:23. Chargers 13–10. **Drive: 15 plays, 59 yards, 7:11.**
- SDG – Wade Richey 38-yard field goal, 8:32. Chargers 16–10. **Drive: 4 plays, 5 yards, 1:31.**
- CLE – Phil Dawson 27-yard field goal, 4:58. Chargers 16–13. **Drive: 8 plays, 54 yards, 3:34.**
- CLE – Kevin Johnson 19-yard pass from Tim Couch (Phil Dawson kick), 1:15. Browns 20–16. **Drive: 8 plays, 50 yards, 2:37.**

**Top passers**

- SDG – Doug Flutie – 17/37, 149 yards
- CLE – Tim Couch – 14/27, 203 yards, TD

**Top rushers**

- SDG – LaDainian Tomlinson – 19 rushes, 102 yards, TD
- CLE – James Jackson – 26 rushes, 68 yards, TD

**Top receivers**

- SDG – Jeff Graham – 5 receptions, 49 yards
- CLE – Rickey Dudley – 3 receptions, 63 yards

With the score at 3–3 midway through the 2nd quarter, Cleveland faced a 3rd and 17 at their own 7. The Browns gained only 14 yards, but a face mask penalty on Alex Molden prolonged the drive, which eventually ended with a touchdown shortly before halftime.

On the first play of the 3rd quarter, Tomlinson started to the left but cut back to the right and broke free for a 54-yard gain. Conway caught a 17-yard pass on the next play, then Tomlinson scored from the 2. Cleveland kicker Phil Dawson missed a 48-yard field goal late in the quarter, and the Chargers converted three 3rd downs before Tomlinson's 17-yard run brought up a 1st and goal at the 1. They were driven back two yards and had to settle for a field goal. On the next play from scrimmage, Seau forced a fumble that Orlando Ruff recovered, setting up Richey's third field goal. Dawson pulled his team within three points on the following drive, and San Diego went three-and-out. Tim Couch converted two 3rd downs to Kevin Johnson on the following drive, the latter for the game-winning touchdown with 75 seconds to play. On the game's final drive, Flutie scrambled for 11 yards on 4th and 10, then completed two passes for 27 further yards. That brought the Chargers to the Cleveland 45, from where Flutie threw two incompletions into the end zone to end the game.

Tomlinson's third 100-yard game left him the league-leader in both rushing yards (412) and rushing touchdowns (6). He had already surpassed the 384 yards with which Fletcher led the team the previous season.

==== Week 5: at New England Patriots ====
Week 5: San Diego Chargers at New England Patriots – Game summary

Quarter	1	2	3	4	OT	Total
Chargers	3	3	7	13	0	**26**
**Patriots**	3	6	7	10	3	**29**

at Foxboro Stadium, Foxboro, Massachusetts

- Date: October 14
- Game time: 1:00 p.m. EDT
- Game weather: Cloudy and Fog, 59 °F (15 °C)
- Game attendance: 60,292
- Referee: Terry McAulay
- TV announcers (CBS): Ian Eagle and Solomon Wilcots
- Box score, Game Book

Game information

**First quarter**

- NE – Adam Vinatieri 26-yard field goal, 9:56. Patriots 3–0. **Drive: 13 plays, 60 yards, 5:04.**
- SDG – Wade Richey 21-yard field goal, 0:00. Tied 3–3. **Drive: 10 plays, 50 yards, 5:19.**

**Second quarter**

- NE – Terry Glenn 21-yard pass from Tom Brady (kick failed, wide left), 3:55. Patriots 9–3. **Drive: 9 plays, 73 yards, 4:34.**
- SDG – Wade Richey 27-yard field goal, 0:29. Patriots 9–6. **Drive: 9 plays, 58 yards, 3:26.**

**Third quarter**

- SDG – LaDainian Tomlinson 1-yard run (Wade Richey kick), 9:43. Chargers 13–9. **Drive: 5 plays, 73 yards, 1:44.**
- NE – Antowain Smith 1-yard run (Adam Vinatieri kick), 4:20. Patriots 16–13. **Drive: 10 plays, 71 yards, 5:23.**

**Fourth quarter**

- SDG – Steve Heiden 3-yard pass from Doug Flutie (run failed), 10:00. Chargers 19–16. **Drive: 8 plays, 34 yards, 4:08.**
- SDG – Derrick Harris 6-yard fumble return (Wade Richey kick), 8:48. Chargers 26–16.
- NE – Adam Vinatieri 23-yard field goal, 3:31. Chargers 26–19. **Drive: 15 plays, 69 yards, 5:17.**
- NE – Jermaine Wiggins 3-yard pass from Tom Brady (Adam Vinatieri kick), 0:36. Tied 26–26. **Drive: 8 plays, 60 yards, 1:34.**

**Overtime**

- NE – Adam Vinatieri 44-yard field goal, 10:55. Patriots 29–26. **Drive: 6 plays, 51 yards, 2:59.**

**Top passers**

- SDG – Doug Flutie – 20/32, 270 yards, TD
- NE – Tom Brady – 33/54, 364 yards, 2 TD

**Top rushers**

- SDG – LaDainian Tomlinson – 24 rushes, 74 yards, TD
- NE – Antowain Smith – 15 rushes, 36 yards, TD

**Top receivers**

- SDG – Curtis Conway – 4 receptions, 117 yards
- NE – Troy Brown – 11 receptions, 117 yards

Trailing 3–0 late in the opening quarter, San Diego reached a 3rd and goal at the 1, but Tomlinson was stopped for a loss of 2 yards, and they settled for a game-tying field goal. Richey missed a 36-yard kick on their next possession. After New England scored the game's first touchdown, San Diego reached a 3rd and 3 and the Patriots 9, but Flutie threw incomplete and they again took a field goal. New England also missed scoring chances in the first half, with Adam Vinatieri failing on both an extra point attempt and a 44-yard field goal as the half ended.

Jenkins returned the opening kickoff 51 yards to the New England 37, but Tomlinson lost a fumble two plays later. The Chargers faced a 3rd and 13 on their own 24 on their next drive, which Flutie converted by finding Conway along the left sideline for a 56-yard completion. This was followed by a 19-yard Conway catch and a 1-yard Tomlinson touchdown on the next two plays. New England responded with a touchdown, but Dwight later gave his offense excellent starting field position with a 26-yard punt return to the opposition 34. That led to Steve Heiden's touchdown, but the Charger lead remained at three points after Bennett mishandled the snap on the extra point attempt. San Diego extended their lead when Patriots punter Lee Johnson tried to dodge Derrick Harris instead of attempting a punt. Harris forced a fumble that he returned for a touchdown himself. New England tied the score with ten points in the final four minutes. First, Antowain Smith gained 5 yards on 4th and 2 midway through a field goal drive then, after Tomlinson was stopped for no gain on a 3rd and 1, they drove 60 yards for a touchdown.

San Diego took over at their own 23 with 31 seconds to play. Tomlinson gained 14 yards, and they called their final timeout. Conway was then tackled just in bounds on a 24-yard reception. Flutie attempted to spike the ball with a second left; after official review, he was ruled to have fumbled while doing so. New England had recovered the ball, but San Diego maintained possession because the whistle had been blown before the recovery. Nonetheless, they lost 2 yards, as the ball was re-spotted where it had landed, and Richey was just short on a 59-yard attempted game-winner. The Chargers received the ball in overtime, but went three-and-out. Molden's 37-yard pass interference penalty helped set up Vinatieri's game-winner.

==== Week 6: vs. Denver Broncos ====
Week 6: Denver Broncos at San Diego Chargers – Game summary

Quarter	1	2	3	4	Total
Broncos	0	7	3	0	**10**
**Chargers**	7	6	7	7	**27**

at Qualcomm Stadium, San Diego, California

- Date: October 21
- Game time: 1:05 p.m. PDT
- Game weather: Clear, 66 °F (19 °C)
- Game attendance: 67,521
- Referee: Bill Leavy
- TV announcers (CBS): Greg Gumbel, Phil Simms and Armen Keteyian
- Box score, Game Book

Game information

**First quarter**

- SDG - Ronney Jenkins 88-yard kickoff return (Wade Richey kick), 14:43. Chargers 7–0.

**Second quarter**

- SDG – Wade Richey 21-yard field goal, 6:35. Chargers 10–0. **Drive: 8 plays, 50 yards, 3:27.**
- SDG – Wade Richey 51-yard field goal, 2:20. Chargers 13–0. **Drive: 6 plays, 11 yards, 1:41.**
- DEN – Desmond Clark 6-yard pass from Brian Griese (Jason Elam kick), 0:41. Chargers 13–7. **Drive: 10 plays, 64 yards, 1:39.**

**Third quarter**

- DEN – Jason Elam 45-yard field goal, 8:49. Chargers 13–10. **Drive: 14 plays, 65 yards, 6:11.**
- SDG – Jeff Graham 17-yard pass from Doug Flutie (Wade Richey kick), 2:17. Chargers 20–10. **Drive: 4 plays, 33 yards, 2:01.**

**Fourth quarter**

- SDG – Jeff Graham 20-yard pass from Doug Flutie (Wade Richey kick), 8:36. Chargers 27–10. **Drive: 5 plays, 38 yards, 2:16.**

**Top passers**

- DEN – Brian Griese – 26/41, 212 yards, TD, 2 INT
- SDG – Doug Flutie – 21/32, 280 yards, 2 TD, INT

**Top rushers**

- DEN – Mike Anderson – 11 rushes, 50 yards
- SDG – LaDainian Tomlinson – 25 rushes, 58 yards

**Top receivers**

- DEN – Rod Smith – 9 receptions, 86 yards
- SDG – Jeff Graham – 7 receptions, 107 yards, 2 TD

Jenkins put the Chargers ahead to stay when he returned the opening kickoff 88 yards for a touchdown, breaking a single tackle at the Charger 25. After two punts each, McNeil intercepted Brian Griese; the Chargers drove into Denver territory, but Fletcher lost a fumble at the 17. After Denver went three-and-out, Conway gained 28 yards on a double reverse bringing up 1st and goal from the 2. San Diego were unable to reach the end zone, and Richey kicked his first field goal; he added another on the following drive. After Denver got on the scoreboard in the final minute of the first half, Flutie completed four consecutive passes for 39 yards, but was then intercepted on 1st and goal from the 6.

Denver continued their momentum into the second half, drawing within three points with a field goal then forcing a punt. Two plays later, Zeke Moreno forced a fumble that Jason Perry recovered at Denver's 33, setting up Graham's first touchdown. In the final quarter, Wiley deflected a pass that Al Fontenot intercepted. This again set San Diego up in Denver territory, and they once more converted the opportunity with a Graham touchdown. A missed 42-yard field goal by Jason Elam on the following drive effectively made the game safe.

==== Week 7: vs. Buffalo Bills ====
Week 7: Buffalo Bills at San Diego Chargers – Game summary

Quarter	1	2	3	4	Total
Bills	0	10	0	14	**24**
**Chargers**	10	3	0	14	**27**

at Qualcomm Stadium, San Diego, California

- Date: October 28
- Game time: 1:15 p.m. PST
- Game weather: Overcast, 65 °F (18 °C)
- Game attendance: 63,698
- Referee: Tony Corrente
- TV announcers (CBS): Craig Bolerjack, Trevor Matich and Scott Kaplan
- Box score, Game Book

Game information

**First quarter**

- SDG – Wade Richey 37-yard field goal, 9:16. Chargers 3–0. **Drive: 11 plays, 61 yards, 5:44.**
- SDG – Freddie Jones 1-yard pass from Doug Flutie (Wade Richey kick), 1:59. Chargers 10–0. **Drive: 9 plays, 58 yards, 5:38.**

**Second quarter**

- SDG – Wade Richey 25-yard field goal, 14:11. Chargers 13–0. **Drive: 5 plays, 13 yards, 2:03.**
- BUF – Rob Johnson 1-yard run (Jake Arians kick), 6:58. Chargers 13–7. **Drive: 5 plays, 58 yards, 2:30.**
- BUF – Jake Arians 41-yard field goal, 0:00. Chargers 13–10. **Drive: 11 plays, 50 yards, 3:36.**

**Third quarter**

- No scoring plays

**Fourth quarter**

- SDG – Jason Perry 37-yard interception return (Wade Richey kick), 10:34. Chargers 20–10.
- BUF – Peerless Price 61-yard pass from Rob Johnson (Jake Arians kick), 10:11. Chargers 20–17. **Drive: 1 play, 61 yards, 0:23.**
- BUF – Travis Henry 3-yard run (Jake Arians kick), 1:30. Bills 24–20. **Drive: 12 plays, 68 yards, 5:06.**
- SDG – Doug Flutie 13-yard run (Wade Richey kick), 1:10. Chargers 27–24. **Drive: 1 play, 13 yards, 0:20.**

**Top passers**

- BUF – Rob Johnson – 24/37, 310 yards, TD, INT
- SDG – Doug Flutie – 21/33, 254 yards, TD

**Top rushers**

- BUF – Rob Johnson – 11 rushes, 67 yards, TD
- SDG – LaDainian Tomlinson – 16 rushes, 76 yards

**Top receivers**

- BUF – Peerless Price – 8 receptions, 151 yards, TD
- SDG – Curtis Conway – 9 receptions, 120 yards

Tomlinson gained 20 yards on the game's first play, and Conway converted 3rd downs with 18- and 16-yard receptions, eventually leading to a field goal. On San Diego's second drive, they reached a 1st and goal at the 1 before losing a yard on two running plays. Flutie then threw incomplete to Graham, but Buffalo were flagged for defensive pass interference, giving the Chargers a fresh set of downs. Jones' touchdown catch came on the next play. Riley sacked Rob Johnson soon afterwards, with Leonardo Carson recovering at the Buffalo 20. The Chargers reached 2nd and goal at the 1, but Tomlinson was stopped twice and Richey added another field goal. The Bills responded midway through the 2nd quarter when Johnson found Peerless Price for 46 yards, and scored himself on the next play. Richey wide right missed from 36 yards, and Bills kicker Jake Arians made a 41-yard field goal as the half ended.

The best scoring chance of the 3rd quarter ended when Arians was short on a 45-yard attempt. In the final period, Perry intercepted an underthrown Johnson pass and returned it 47 yards down the sideline for a touchdown. Johnson bounced back on the next play from scrimmage, finding Price open up the right sideline for a 61-yard touchdown. After Richey was wide right again, this time from 41 yards, the Bills began their go-ahead drive with 6:36 to play. Johnson ran for 6 yards on 3rd and 6, Eric Moulds caught a deflected pass for 31 yards on 3rd and 5, and McNeil committed defensive holding after the Chargers stopped Johnson short on 3rd and goal from the 10. Buffalo took their first lead of the game on the following play, with 90 seconds left. It took the Chargers only 20 seconds to respond: Jenkins returned the kickoff 72 yards to the Buffalo 26, an unsportsmanlike conduct penalty moved the ball to the 13, and Flutie dodged a sack before scrambling up the middle for the winning touchdown. Johnson was able to position Arians for a 44-yard game-tying attempt, but it was blocked by Ed Ellis with 7 seconds left.

==== Week 8: vs. Kansas City Chiefs ====
Week 8: Kansas City Chiefs at San Diego Chargers – Game summary

Quarter	1	2	3	4	Total
**Chiefs**	9	10	0	6	**25**
Chargers	0	0	10	10	**20**

at Qualcomm Stadium, San Diego, California

- Date: November 4
- Game time: 1:15 p.m. PST
- Game weather: Clear, 67 °F (19 °C)
- Game attendance: 58,789
- Referee: Ron Winter
- TV announcers (CBS): Kevin Harlan, Craig James and Beasley Reece
- Box score, Game Book

Game information

**First quarter**

- KC – Todd Peterson 37-yard field goal, 5:08. Chiefs 3–0. **Drive: 8 plays, 13 yards, 3:34.**
- KC – Tony Richardson 1-yard run (kick blocked), 1:43. Chiefs 9–0. **Drive: 5 plays, 52 yards, 2:18.**

**Second quarter**

- KC – Priest Holmes 3-yard run (Todd Peterson kick), 3:23. Chiefs 16–0. **Drive: 5 plays, 66 yards, 2:38.**
- KC – Todd Peterson 28-yard field goal, 0:00. Chiefs 19–0. **Drive: 9 plays, 56 yards, 1:15.**

**Third quarter**

- SDG – Wade Richey 48-yard field goal, 9:17. Chiefs 19–3. **Drive: 8 plays, 12 yards, 2:10.**
- KC – LaDainian Tomlinson 8-yard run (Wade Richey kick), 0:25. Chiefs 19–10. **Drive: 6 plays, 89 yards, 2:52.**

**Fourth quarter**

- SDG – Wade Richey 35-yard field goal, 12:35. Chiefs 19–13. **Drive: 5 plays, 38 yards, 1:26.**
- SDG – Freddie Jones 20-yard pass from Drew Brees (Wade Richey kick), 6:10. Chargers 20–19. **Drive: 9 plays, 89 yards, 3:32.**
- KC – Tony Richardson 1-yard run (pass failed), 1:26. Chiefs 25–20. **Drive: 10 plays, 71 yards, 4:44.**

**Top passers**

- KAN – Trent Green – 13/25, 146 yards, INT
- SDG – Drew Brees – 15/27, 221 yards, TD

**Top rushers**

- KAN – Priest Holmes – 30 rushes, 181 yards, TD
- SDG – LaDainian Tomlinson – 13 rushes, 31 yards, TD

**Top receivers**

- KAN – Snoop Minnis – 2 receptions, 44 yards
- SDG – Jeff Graham – 5 receptions, 94 yards

On their first drive, San Diego reached a 3rd and 7 on the Chiefs 44 before Flutie was intercepted; the ball was run back to the Charger 33, leading to a field goal. The Chargers then went three-and-out, with Bennett's punt only going 26 yards. Priest Holmes had back-to-back runs of 26 and 21 yards as Kansas City drove for their first touchdown, though Parrella blocked the extra point. In the 2nd quarter, San Diego drove as far as the Chiefs 15 before losing yardage on three straight plays, including an 11-yard sack that knocked Flutie out of the game with a concussion. Richey then missed a field goal from 49 yards and, after being given another chance due to a Chiefs penalty, missed from 43 yards as well. After another Kansas City touchdown, Brees entered the game for his first NFL action, but was sacked the first time he dropped back to pass. Kansas City added another field goal for a 19–0 halftime lead.

Cody intercepted Trent Green early in the 3rd quarter, and Brees led four consecutive scoring drives. Firstly, he converted a 4th and 3 with a 6-yard pass to Conway, setting up Richey's first field goal. A Wiley sack of Green pushed Kansas City out of field goal range on the next drive, and Graham's 40-yard catch was the biggest play of an 89-yard drive that featured no 3rd-down conversions and ended with Tomlinson's touchdown run. Next, Graham's 20-yard catch positioned Richey for another field goal. Finally, San Diego moved from their own 11 to a 3rd and 10 at their own 40, from where Brees threw completions on three straight plays: 14 and 26 yards to Conway, then a 20-yard touchdown to Jones in the front of the end zone. Behind for the first time, Kansas City responded immediately, their game-winning touchdown drive draining San Diego's last two timeouts and leaving only 86 seconds to respond. Aided by a personal foul penalty, the Chargers reached Kansas City's 41 with 13 seconds left. Brees then scrambled as far as the 28, but couldn't reach the sidelines to stop the clock. His attempt at a lateral went forwards with 2 seconds left, counting as an illegal forward pass and causing the final seconds to be run off the clock as a penalty.

Brees would later hold the NFL career record for most touchdown passes; Jones caught the first of the 571 touchdowns he would throw during his career. Holmes' 181 rushing yards were the most in any game against the Chargers up to that point.

==== Week 9: at Denver Broncos ====
Week 9: San Diego Chargers at Denver Broncos – Game summary

Quarter	1	2	3	4	Total
Chargers	0	0	3	13	**16**
**Broncos**	3	17	6	0	**26**

at Invesco Field, Denver, Colorado

- Date: November 11
- Game time: 2:05 p.m. MST
- Game weather: Partly Sunny, 62 °F (17 °C)
- Game attendance: 74,951
- Referee: Bill Carollo
- TV announcers (CBS): Dick Enberg, Dan Dierdorf and Bonnie Bernstein
- Box score, Game Book

Game information

**First quarter**

- DEN – Jason Elam 25-yard field goal, 6:35. Broncos 3–0. **Drive: 13 plays, 62 yards, 6:38.**

**Second quarter**

- DEN – Jason Elam 29-yard field goal, 8:02. Broncos 6–0. **Drive: 11 plays, 69 yards, 5:10.**
- DEN – Desmond Clark 18-yard pass from Brian Griese (Jason Elam kick), 1:07. Broncos 13–0. **Drive: 9 plays, 77 yards, 3:26.**
- DEN – Dwayne Carswell 3-yard pass from Brian Griese (Jason Elam kick), 0:28. Broncos 20–0. **Drive: 1 play, 3 yards, 0:04.**

**Third quarter**

- DEN – Jason Elam 26-yard field goal, 11:54. Broncos 23–0. **Drive: 4 plays, 1 yard, 1:26.**
- SDG – Wade Richey 29-yard field goal, 9:42. Broncos 23–3. **Drive: 4 plays, 3 yards, 2:12.**
- DEN – Jason Elam 33-yard field goal, 5:38. Broncos 26–3. **Drive: 8 plays, 37 yards, 4:04.**

**Fourth quarter**

- SDG – Curtis Conway 72-yard pass from Doug Flutie (Wade Richey kick), 14:50. Broncos 26–10. **Drive: 2 plays, 80 yards, 0:58.**
- SDG – Raylee Johnson 45-yard fumble return (run failed), 10:57. Broncos 26–16.

**Top passers**

- SDG – Doug Flutie – 12/31, 165 yards, TD, 4 INT
- DEN – Brian Griese – 21/31, 224 yards, 2 TD

**Top rushers**

- SDG – LaDainian Tomlinson – 14 rushes, 75 yards
- DEN – Terrell Davis – 33 rushes, 83 yards

**Top receivers**

- SDG – Curtis Conway – 3 receptions, 111 yards, TD
- DEN – Rod Smith – 5 receptions, 74 yards

San Diego failed to cross midfield on any of their first three possessions, punting each time while Denver scored two field goals. The Chargers did manage to reach opposition territory on their next drive, but Flutie was sacked for a loss of 18 on 3rd down. Denver then drove for Griese's first touchdown pass; 39 seconds later he had a second, after Flutie was intercepted deep in Charger territory.

Chargers kick returner Reggie Jones fumbled a punt return early in the 3rd quarter, leading to a Broncos field goal; he then returned the kickoff 74 yards; setting up a Charger field goal. After a fourth Denver field goal, the Broncos led 26–3. San Diego managed their first touchdown on the first play of the 4th quarter, with Conway taking advantage of blown coverage downfield for an easy 72-yard touchdown. On the following Denver drive, Griese fumbled under pressure from Gerald Dixon, with Raylee Johnson recovering and returning the ball 45 yards for an easy touchdown. Fletcher was stopped short on the two-point conversion attempt, leaving the Chargers two scores behind. They got no closer, with Flutie throwing interceptions on their next three drives.

The Chargers gained a season-low 9 first downs. Flutie's 4 interceptions would prove to be the most of his career.

==== Week 10: at Oakland Raiders ====
Week 10: San Diego Chargers at Oakland Raiders – Game summary

Quarter	1	2	3	4	Total
Chargers	7	0	10	7	**24**
**Raiders**	14	0	3	17	**34**

at Network Associates Coliseum, Oakland, California

- Date: November 18
- Game time: 1:05 p.m. PST
- Game weather: Sunny skies, 65 °F (18 °C)
- Game attendance: 61,960
- Referee: Dick Hantak
- TV announcers (CBS): Dick Enberg, Dan Dierdorf and Bonnie Bernstein
- Box score, Game Book

Game information

**First quarter**

- OAK – Tim Brown 10-yard pass from Rich Gannon (Sebastian Janikowski kick), 9:40. Raiders 7–0. **Drive: 11 plays, 82 yards, 5:20.**
- SDG – Curtis Conway 67-yard run (Wade Richey kick), 9:13. Tied 7–7. **Drive: 1 play, 67 yards, 0:27.**
- OAK – Jerry Rice 12-yard pass from Rich Gannon (Sebastian Janikowski kick), 1:50. Raiders 14–7. **Drive: 8 plays, 66 yards, 3:53.**

**Second quarter**

- No scoring plays

**Third quarter**

- SDG – Wade Richey 26-yard field goal, 12:05. Raiders 14–10. **Drive: 7 plays, 17 yards, 2:55.**
- OAK – Sebastian Janikowski 24-yard field goal, 4:37. Raiders 17–10. **Drive: 7 plays, 29 yards, 4:02.**
- SDG – Ronney Jenkins 93-yard kickoff return (Wade Richey kick), 4:18. Tied 17–17.

**Fourth quarter**

- OAK – Jerry Rice 30-yard pass from Rich Gannon (Sebastian Janikowski kick), 14:54. Raiders 24–17. **Drive: 10 plays, 61 yards, 4:24.**
- SDG – LaDainian Tomlinson 1-yard run (Wade Richey kick), 9:57. Tied 24–24. **Drive: 9 plays, 63 yards, 4:57.**
- OAK – Jerry Rice 20-yard pass from Rich Gannon (Sebastian Janikowski kick), 2:46. Raiders 31–24. **Drive: 7 plays, 65 yards, 3:18.**
- OAK – Sebastian Janikowski 25-yard field goal, 0:55. Raiders 34–24. **Drive: 4 plays, 9 yards, 0:59.**

**Top passers**

- SDG – Doug Flutie – 12/27, 98 yards, INT
- OAK – Rich Gannon – 25/38, 311 yards, 4 TD, INT

**Top rushers**

- SDG – LaDainian Tomlinson – 22 rushes, 67 yards, TD
- OAK – Charlie Garner – 18 rushes, 59 yards

**Top receivers**

- SDG – Curtis Conway – 2 receptions, 32 yards
- OAK – Jerry Rice – 8 receptions, 131 yards, 3 TD

After the Raiders scored on the game's opening drive, San Diego responded on the next play – Conway took a reverse to the left, then worked his way back around to the right while profiting from several key blocks, eventually completing a 67-yard touchdown. San Diego failed to cross the Raider 40 on their next five possessions, all punts, and trailed to a Jerry Rice touchdown at halftime.

Jenkins returned the second-half kickoff for 67 yards before Raiders kicker Sebastian Janikowski tackled him at the Raider 25. Despite the ensuing drive being prolonged by a Raider penalty on a 3rd down play, San Diego had to settle for a short Richey field goal. McNeil stopped the next Raider drive by intercepting a deep Rich Gannon pass near the goal line, but San Diego went three-and-out, and Oakland soon added a Janikowski field goal. Jenkins returned the next kickoff 93 yards for a touchdown, his second of the season. Zack Crockett converted a 4th and 1 on the following drive, which ended with Rice's second touchdown. Flutie began San Diego's response with completions of 22 and 10 yards to Conway, before finding Graham for 16 yards on a 3rd and 9. Tomlinson finished the drive by going through the line for a touchdown on 3rd and goal from the 1. Each side then punted once before the Raiders drove for Rice's third and game-winning touchdown. Flutie soon fumbled on a 3rd and 7 from his own 33, and Oakland added a field goal to clinch the win.

Raylee Johnson had 3 of the Chargers' 4 sacks. Jenkins returned 6 kickoffs for 250 yards and a touchdown; as of 2022, this remains a franchise record for kickoff return yardage in a single game.

==== Week 11: vs. Arizona Cardinals ====
Week 11: Arizona Cardinals at San Diego Chargers – Game summary

Quarter	1	2	3	4	Total
**Cardinals**	0	7	3	10	**20**
Chargers	3	0	0	14	**17**

at Qualcomm Stadium, San Diego, California

- Date: November 25
- Game time: 1:05 p.m. PST
- Game weather: Clear and Sunny, 63 °F (17 °C)
- Game attendance: 49,398
- Referee: Walt Coleman
- TV announcers (Fox): Kenny Albert, Tim Green and Tim Ryan
- Box score, Game Book

Game information

**First quarter**

- SDG – Wade Richey 26-yard field goal, 1:27. Chargers 3–0. **Drive: 4 plays, 8 yards, 2:04.**

**Second quarter**

- ARI – David Boston 37-yard pass from Jake Plummer (Bill Gramatica kick), 2:04. Cardinals 7–3. **Drive: 6 plays, 80 yards, 3:34.**

**Third quarter**

- ARI – Bill Gramatica 18-yard field goal, 10:07. Cardinals 10–3. **Drive: 10 plays, 28 yards, 4:53.**

**Fourth quarter**

- SDG – Curtis Conway 6-yard pass from Doug Flutie (Wade Richey kick), 14:19. Tied 10–10. **Drive: 14 plays, 99 yards, 7:54.**
- ARI – Michael Pittman 1-yard run (Bill Gramatica kick), 6:00. Cardinals 17–10. **Drive: 9 plays, 68 yards, 3:49.**
- SDG – Jeff Graham 28-yard pass from Doug Flutie (Wade Richey kick), 1:54. Tied 17–17. **Drive: 8 plays, 72 yards, 4:06.**
- ARI – Bill Gramatica 42-yard field goal, 0:01. Cardinals 20–17. **Drive: 8 plays, 40 yards, 1:53.**

**Top passers**

- ARI – Jake Plummer – 19/31, 241 yards, TD, 2 INT
- SDG – Doug Flutie – 33/44, 308 yards, 2 TD

**Top rushers**

- ARI – Michael Pittman – 18 rushes, 44 yards, TD
- SDG – LaDainian Tomlinson – 21 rushes, 75 yards

**Top receivers**

- ARI – David Boston – 6 receptions, 121 yards
- SDG – Jeff Graham – 7 receptions, 98 yards, TD

On their second possession of the game, San Diego opted to try a field goal on 4th and 1 from the Arizona 8, but Richey missed from 25 yards out. Dixon intercepted Jake Plummer three plays later, and Richey made his second attempt after the offense could only gain 8 yards. Their next possession covered 66 yards in 15 plays, featuring three 3rd-down conversions, but produced no points after Richey missed again, from 27 yards. Arizona responded with an 80-yard touchdown drive, and led 7–3 at halftime.

Arizona reached a 3rd and goal at the 1 on the opening drive of the second half, but Seau and Johnson stopped Michael Pittman short of the end zone and the Cardinals settled for a chip shot Bill Gramatica field goal. A Tomlinson fumble then gave Arizona the ball at the San Diego 36. Pittman converted a 4th and 1, but Perry intercepted a tipped pass at his own 1. On the ensuing 99-yard touchdown drive, Flutie completed 11 of 11 passes for 111 yards, converting three 3rd downs and finding Conway for the game-tying touchdown. When Arizona retook the lead in the final quarter, Flutie responded with completions of 26 yards to Trevor Gaylor and 28 yards to Graham, the latter for a touchdown on the first play after the two minute warning. The Cardinals reached a 3rd and 1 at the Charger 35, which Plummer converted with a 13-yard pass to David Boston. This enabled the Cardinals to run all but a second off the clock, with Gramatica kicking the game-winner from 42 yards.

As well as his 21 carries for 75 yards, Tomlinson caught 13 passes for 72 yards. The 13 receptions set a new record for a Chargers running back. (Note: Austin Ekeler broke this record in 2018.) The Chargers lost despite holding the ball for over 34 minutes, outgaining the Cardinals by 392 yards to 298, and creating two of the game's three takeaways. After this game, San Diego signed Steve Christie as their main field goal kicker.

==== Week 12: at Seattle Seahawks ====
Week 12: San Diego Chargers at Seattle Seahawks – Game summary

Quarter	1	2	3	4	OT	Total
Chargers	0	3	7	0	0	**10**
**Seahawks**	7	0	3	0	3	**13**

at Husky Stadium, Seattle, Washington

- Date: December 2
- Game time: 1:05 p.m. PST
- Game weather: Overcast, 41 °F (5 °C)
- Game attendance: 55,466
- Referee: Larry Nemmers
- TV announcers (CBS): Kevin Harlan, Craig James and Beasley Reece
- Box score, Game Book

Game information

**First quarter**

- SEA – Shaun Alexander 1-yard run (Rian Lindell kick), 7:29. Seahawks 7–0. **Drive: 7 plays, 72 yards, 3:44.**

**Second quarter**

- SDG – Steve Christie 26-yard field goal, 5:11. Seahawks 7–3. **Drive: 9 plays, 46 yards, 5:01.**

**Third quarter**

- SDG – LaDainian Tomlinson 1-yard run (Steve Christie kick), 6:18. Chargers 10–7. **Drive: 8 plays, 43 yards, 3:03.**
- SEA – Rian Lindell 43-yard field goal, 2:40. Tied 10–10. **Drive: 9 plays, 36 yards, 3:38.**

**Fourth quarter**

- No scoring plays

**Overtime**

- SEA – Rian Lindell 24-yard field goal, 8:37. Seahawks 13–10. **Drive: 11 plays, 62 yards, 6:23.**

**Top passers**

- SDG – Doug Flutie – 19/33, 195 yards, 2 INT
- SEA – Matt Hasselbeck – 19/35, 202 yards

**Top rushers**

- SDG – LaDainian Tomlinson – 24 rushes, 87 yards, TD
- SEA – Shaun Alexander – 29 rushes, 87 yards, TD

**Top receivers**

- SDG – Tim Dwight – 5 receptions, 59 yards
- SEA – Darrell Jackson – 6 receptions, 76 yards

Tomlinson opened the game with carries of 10 and 19 yards, but the Chargers' drive stalled and they were forced to punt. Seattle then drove 72 yards to their lone touchdown of the day. In the 2nd quarter, San Diego reached a 3rd and 1 at the Seattle 8, but Tomlinson was stopped for no gain, and Christie came in to convert his first field goal as a Charger. Dwight had catches on three consecutive plays on their next possession, covering 40 yards and positioning Richey for a 53-yard attempt, which he missed wide left 11 seconds before halftime.

San Diego took the lead with a touchdown drive midway through the 3rd quarter. Flutie completed consecutive 15-yard passes to Conway and Tomlinson, before Tomlinson barely crossed the goal line on 3rd and goal from the 1. After Seattle tied the score, the Chargers reached a 2nd and 4 at the Seahawks 19, but a Flutie pass was deflected and intercepted. On their following drive they faced 3rd and 6 at the Seahawks 42. Graham caught an 8-yard pass, but fumbled and Seattle recovered. Seahawks kicker Rian Lindell missed a 43-yard field goal on the next drive and, following a Chargers three-and-out, missed a 48-yard kick as time expired in regulation. However, he got a third chance after Seattle won the overtime coin toss, winning the game from 24 yards out.

Both teams entered the game having lost seven consecutive overtime times in games that went to overtime. As of 2022, the Chargers' eight straight overtime loss represents the second-worst such run in NFL history, behind the New England Patriots with ten consecutive from 1977 to 1987.

==== Week 13: at Philadelphia Eagles ====
Week 13: San Diego Chargers at Philadelphia Eagles – Game summary

Quarter	1	2	3	4	Total
Chargers	7	7	0	0	**14**
**Eagles**	14	7	0	3	**24**

at Veterans Stadium, Philadelphia, Pennsylvania

- Date: December 9
- Game time: 1:00 p.m. EST
- Game weather: Mostly Cloudy, 43 °F (6 °C)
- Game attendance: 65,438
- Referee: Bernie Kukar
- TV announcers (CBS): Dick Enberg, Dan Dierdorf and Bonnie Bernstein
- Box score, Game Book

Game information

**First quarter**

- PHI – Chad Lewis 1-yard pass from Donovan McNabb (David Akers kick), 10:49. Eagles 7–0. **Drive: 6 plays, 63 yards, 2:21.**
- SDG – Jeff Graham 61-yard pass from Doug Flutie (Steve Christie kick), 8:48. Tied 7–7. **Drive: 6 plays, 78 yards, 2:01.**
- PHI – Brian Dawkins 49-yard fumble return (David Akers kick), 5:47. Eagles 14–7.

**Second quarter**

- PHI – Duce Staley 8-yard pass from Donovan McNabb, (David Akers kick), 1:57. Eagles 21–7. **Drive: 8 plays, 81 yards, 3:14.**
- SDG – Jeff Graham 10-yard pass from Doug Flutie (Steve Christie kick), 1:01. Eagles 21–14. **Drive: 7 plays, 71 yards, 0:56.**

**Third quarter**

- No scoring plays

**Fourth quarter**

- PHI – David Akers 37-yard field goal, 8:26. Eagles 24–14. **Drive: 4 plays, 7 yards, 1:25.**

**Top passers**

- SDG – Doug Flutie – 20/44, 307 yards, 2 TD, 2 INT
- PHI – Donovan McNabb – 22/44, 221 yards, 2 TD, INT

**Top rushers**

- SDG – LaDainian Tomlinson – 19 rushes, 51 yards
- PHI – Donovan McNabb – 7 rushes, 39 yards

**Top receivers**

- SDG – Jeff Graham – 5 receptions, 110 yards, 2 TD
- PHI – Duce Staley – 5 receptions, 88 yards, TD

Philadelphia opened the scoring on their first possession of the game, but San Diego quickly tied the score. Graham converted a 3rd and 10 with a 16-yard catch, then scored a 61-yard touchdown on a 3rd and 9. Graham jumped and reached over the shoulders of defensive back Troy Vincent for an underthrown ball, bobbling it briefly before completing the catch at the Philadelphia 40 and racing into the end zone. Later in the opening quarter, Dwight took a pass in the left flat for 29 yards; two plays later, San Diego had a 3rd and 1 at the Eagles 38. Tomlinson then fumbled while trying to make a cut, with Brian Dawkins recovering and scoring when Tomlinson could not make the tackle. Two further Charger drives that crossed midfield ended with a Flutie interception and a missed 34-yard field goal by Christie. After Philadelphia extended their lead late in the half, San Diego were able to respond in less than a minute. Flutie completed 4 of 6 passes for 60 yards on the drive, including a 29-yard connection with Conway and a 10-yard touchdown to Graham.

While San Diego's defense kept Philadelphia out of the end zone in the second half, the offense struggled, failing to cross midfield on any of their first six possessions. The fifth of these ended when Flutie lost a fumble while scrambling for a first down, leading to a Philadelphia field goal. The Chargers did manage a longer drive late in the game starting from their own 4 yard line and advancing over midfield with back-to-back Jones catches of 34 and 20 yards. The drive stalled at the Philadelphia 19, and Christie missed a 37-yard field goal to effectively decide the game.

Tomlinson passed the 1,000-yard rushing milestone during the game. He was the first Charger to do so since Natrone Means in 1994, and the first Charger rookie since Don Woods in 1974.

==== Week 14: vs. Oakland Raiders ====
Week 14: Oakland Raiders at San Diego Chargers – Game summary

Quarter	1	2	3	4	Total
**Raiders**	3	0	7	3	**13**
Chargers	0	3	0	3	**6**

at Qualcomm Stadium, San Diego, California

- Date: December 15
- Game time: 2:15 p.m. PST
- Game weather: Clear and Sunny, 62 °F (17 °C)
- Game attendance: 67,349
- Referee: Bill Leavy
- TV announcers (CBS): Greg Gumbel, Phil Simms and Armen Keteyian
- Box score, Game Book

Game information

**First quarter**

- OAK – Sebastian Janikowski 20-yard field goal, 2:27. Raiders 3–0. **Drive: 13 plays, 62 yards, 6:00.**

**Second quarter**

- SDG – Steve Christie 29-yard field goal, 10:49. Tied 3–3. **Drive: 14 plays, 64 yards, 6:38.**

**Third quarter**

- OAK – Jerry Rice 40-yard pass from Rich Gannon (Sebastian Janikowski kick), 5:45. Raiders 10–3. **Drive: 10 plays, 88 yards, 5:05.**

**Fourth quarter**

- SDG – Steve Christie 31-yard field goal, 13:16. Raiders 10–6. **Drive: 4 plays, 2 yards, 1:34.**
- OAK – Sebastian Janikowski 31-yard field goal, 1:07. Raiders 13–6. **Drive: 10 plays, 42 yards, 4:46.**

**Top passers**

- OAK – Rich Gannon – 20/28, 221 yards, TD, INT
- SDG – Doug Flutie – 19/37, 215 yards, 3 INT

**Top rushers**

- OAK – Charlie Garner – 19 rushes, 68 yards
- SDG – LaDainian Tomlinson – 17 rushes, 46 yards

**Top receivers**

- OAK – Jerry Rice – 6 receptions, 93 yards, TD
- SDG – Curtis Conway – 6 receptions, 99 yards

Oakland reached the San Diego 1 yard line in the opening quarter, but settled for a field goal after Gannon threw incomplete on 3rd and goal. In response, the Chargers converted three 3rd downs before their drive stalled at the Oakland 11 and Christie tied the score. All other drives in the first half ended with punts.

Flutie opened the second half by completing his first four passes for 55 yards, guiding the Chargers to a 2nd and 8 at the 11. His next pass, however, was thrown into the arms of defensive lineman Darrell Russell for an interception. Oakland drove 88 yards the other way, and Rice beat Beckett to score his fourth touchdown in two games against the Chargers. Two plays later, a Flutie pass deflected off Conway and was intercepted, but the Chargers got the ball back soon afterwards when Beckett forced a fumble and Johnson recovered. The ensuing drive was extended when Tim Brown muffed a Bennett punt and Jenkins recovered at the Oakland 15, though the Chargers could only capitalize with another field goal. Harrison intercepted a deflected pass, and Flutie converted a 4th and 1 with a 5-yard pass to Conway. The Chargers reached 2nd and goal from the 2 with six minutes to play before Flutie was intercepted for a third time. Oakland drained the last Charger timeout and all but 67 seconds of the clock before Janikowski's second field goal. Jenkins returned the ensuing kickoff 38 yards, and a 34-yard catch and run by Conway had the Chargers at the Oakland 24. After two plays gained one yard, Flutie overthrew Graham in the end zone, then Graham dropped his 4th-down pass inside the 10 with 15 seconds to play.

==== Week 15: at Kansas City Chiefs ====
Week 15: San Diego Chargers at Kansas City Chiefs – Game summary

Quarter	1	2	3	4	Total
Chargers	7	0	7	3	**17**
**Chiefs**	7	0	3	10	**20**

at Arrowhead Stadium, Kansas City, Missouri

- Date: December 23
- Game time: 12:00 p.m. CST
- Game weather: Overcast, 28 °F (−2 °C)
- Game attendance: 76,131
- Referee: Bob McElwee
- TV announcers (CBS): Don Criqui and Steve Tasker
- Box score, Game Book

Game information

**First quarter**

- KC – Jason Dunn 3-yard pass from Trent Green (Todd Peterson kick), 6:32. Chiefs 7–0. **Drive: 16 plays, 80 yards, 8:28.**
- SDG – Freddie Jones 3-yard pass from Doug Flutie (Steve Christie kick), 3:41. Tied 7–7. **Drive: 5 plays, 57 yards, 2:51.**

**Second quarter**

- No scoring plays

**Third quarter**

- KC – Todd Peterson 33-yard field goal, 10:15. Chiefs 10–7. **Drive: 6 plays, 51 yards, 2:56.**
- SDG – Curtis Conway 4-yard pass from Doug Flutie (Steve Christie kick), 1:02. Chargers 14–10. **Drive: 10 plays, 71 yards, 5:22.**

**Fourth quarter**

- KC – Todd Peterson 41-yard field goal, 13:25. Chargers 14–13. **Drive: 6 plays, 37 yards, 2:37.**
- SDG – Steve Christie 27-yard field goal, 5:01. Chargers 17–13. **Drive: 10 plays, 65 yards, 4:41.**
- KC – Tony Richardson 1-yard run (Todd Peterson kick), 6:32. Chiefs 20–17. **Drive: 8 plays, 65 yards, 4:13.**

**Top passers**

- SDG – Doug Flutie – 15/27, 175 yards, 2 TD
- KC – Trent Green – 19/28, 203 yards, TD, 2 INT

**Top rushers**

- SDG – LaDainian Tomlinson – 27 rushes, 145 yards
- KC – Priest Holmes – 23 rushes, 80 yards

**Top receivers**

- SDG – Trevor Gaylor – 5 receptions, 78 yards
- KC – Snoop Minnis – 6 receptions, 80 yards

On the game's opening drive, Trent Green converted three 3rd down situations with completions to Snoop Minnis, and a fourth with a touchdown to Jason Dunn. San Diego responded with Tomlinson's 34-yard run around right end setting up Jones' touchdown catch. Beckett intercepted Green on the next play, and Tomlinson had back-to-back gains of 10 and 22 yards to move the Chargers across midfield, but they eventually punted from the Chiefs' 36 yard line. The closest either team came to scoring for the rest of the half was a missed 41-yard field goal by Kansas City kicker Todd Peterson.

Kansas City retook the lead with a 3rd quarter field goal. Following an exchange of punts, San Diego drove to a 2nd and goal from the 4, whereupon Conway was ruled to have caught a Flutie pass out of bounds; the call was reversed to a touchdown on official review. Following another Peterson field goal, Conway converted a 3rd and 26 with a 27-yard catch, eventually leading to a 46-yard field goal that Richey missed wide left. McNeil intercepted Green on the following play, and a 27-yard catch by Trevor Gaylor moved the Chargers back into Chiefs territory, and Christie extended their lead with a 27-yard field goal five minutes from time. Green and Minnis combined for 21 yards on 3rd and 4 as Kansas City drove inside the San Diego 10 yard line. A controversial play then followed, as Green was intercepted by Leonardo Carson, but the Chiefs retained the ball when Harrison was judged to have struck Green with a forearm after he threw, counting as roughing the passer. Tony Richardson scored the winning touchdown three plays later. The game ended with a Charger false start penalty on their own 29 yard line, causing a ten-second runoff.

==== Week 16: vs. Seattle Seahawks ====
Week 16: Seattle Seahawks at San Diego Chargers – Game summary

Quarter	1	2	3	4	Total
**Seahawks**	0	14	8	3	**25**
Chargers	10	3	3	6	**22**

at Qualcomm Stadium, San Diego, California

- Date: December 30
- Game time: 1:15 p.m. PST
- Game weather: Overcast, 63 °F (17 °C)
- Game attendance: 51,412
- Referee: Tom White
- TV announcers (CBS): Bill Macatee, Trevor Matich and Scott Kaplan
- Box score, Game Book

Game information

**First quarter**

- SDG – Curtis Conway 4-yard pass from Doug Flutie (Steve Christie kick), 7:55. Chargers 7–0. **Drive: 4 plays, 26 yards, 1:49.**
- SDG – Steve Christie 32-yard field goal, 4:39. Chargers 10–0. **Drive: 5 plays, 46 yards, 1:59.**

**Second quarter**

- SDG – Steve Christie 25-yard field goal, 13:31. Chargers 13–0. **Drive: 9 plays, 65 yards, 4:32.**
- SEA - Darrell Jackson 43-yard pass from Trent Dilfer (Rian Lindell kick), 12:01. Chargers 13–7. **Drive: 3 plays, 76 yards, 1:30.**
- SEA - Darrell Jackson 48-yard pass from Trent Dilfer (Rian Lindell kick), 7:19. Seahawks 14–13. **Drive: 5 plays, 74 yards, 3:03.**

**Third quarter**

- SDG – Steve Christie 40-yard field goal, 9:33. Chargers 16–14. **Drive: 12 plays, 51 yards, 5:27.**
- SEA - James Williams 37-yard pass from Trent Dilfer (Trent Dilfer-Christian Fauria pass), 6:21. Seahawks 22–16. **Drive: 6 plays, 66 yards, 3:12.**

**Fourth quarter**

- SDG – Steve Christie 41-yard field goal, 10:11. Seahawks 22–19. **Drive: 9 plays, 61 yards, 4:37.**
- SDG – Steve Christie 36-yard field goal, 0:16. Tied 22–22. **Drive: 12 plays, 44 yards, 2:21.**
- SEA – Rian Lindell 54-yard field goal, 0:00. Seahawks 25–22. **Drive: 1 play, 0 yards, 0:16.**

**Top passers**

- SEA – Trent Dilfer – 14/23, 267 yards, 3 TD
- SDG – Doug Flutie – 34/53, 377 yards, TD, 2 INT

**Top rushers**

- SEA – Shaun Alexander – 23 rushes, 59 yards
- SDG – LaDainian Tomlinson – 14 rushes, 38 yards

**Top receivers**

- SEA – Darrell Jackson – 5 receptions, 114 yards, 2 TD
- SDG – Curtis Conway – 11 receptions, 156 yards, TD

Conway opened the scoring four plays after Jeff Feagles shanked a 13-yard punt for Seattle, then set up a field goal with a 38-yard catch, made while drawing a defensive pass interference flag. Conway had 21- and 18-yard catches on the following drive, but had an 11-yard touchdown ruled out when he was judged to have stepped out of bounds prior to making the catch; the Chargers settled for another field goal, and a 13–0 lead. Trent Dilfer and Darrell Jackson turned the game around by combining for two similar touchdowns in the space of five minutes, with Jackson beating McNeil for catches 45 yards up the left sideline both times.

In the second half, Christie restored the Charger lead with his third field goal, striking both the right upright and the crossbar before going through. Dilfer responded with passes for a touchdown and a two-point conversion. A 31-yard catch by Gaylor moved San Diego into opposition territory early in the final period. The Chargers reached a 3rd and 1 from the 19, but Tomlinson was stopped inches short; they were poised to go for it on 4th down, but Jacox was flagged for a false start, and Christie hit another field goal instead. Lindell missed a 48-yard field goal with 2:37 to play, and Flutie completed four passes while leading his team from the San Diego 39 to a 1st down at the Seattle 11. He was sacked for a loss of 7 on the next play, then threw two incompletions before Christie converted his fifth field goal from five attempts with 16 seconds to play. Charlie Rogers fielded the ensuing kickoff at his own goal line and returned it for 64 yards before Jenkins caught him from behind. Lindell's 54-yard game-winning kick easily cleared the uprights as time expired.

Conway's 11 catches and 156 receiving yards would both be career highs. Also, Flutie's 34 completions, 53 attempts and 377 yards would all be career highs.

== Standings ==
AFC West
	W	L	T	PCT	PF	PA	STK
^{(3)} Oakland Raiders	10	6	0	.625	399	327	L3
Seattle Seahawks	9	7	0	.563	301	324	W2
Denver Broncos	8	8	0	.500	340	339	L1
Kansas City Chiefs	6	10	0	.375	320	344	L1
San Diego Chargers	5	11	0	.313	332	321	L9

== Awards ==
Four Chargers were named to the 2002 Pro Bowl, one of whom was also named to the Associated Press (AP) All-Pro team. Also, Tomlinson finished second in voting for the Offensive Rookie of the Year (Anthony Thomas received 20 nominations, Tomlinson received 16).

Player	Position	Pro Bowl starter	Pro Bowl reserve	Pro Bowl alternate	AP 1st team All-Pro	AP 2nd team All-Pro
Rodney Harrison	Safety	Yes				
Ryan McNeil	Cornerback			Yes		
Junior Seau	Linebacker		Yes			
Marcellus Wiley	Defensive end	Yes				Yes
