= 2001 Denver Broncos season =

American football team season

- Owner: Pat Bowlen
- General manager: Neal Dahlen and Mike Shanahan
- President: Pat Bowlen
- Head coach: Mike Shanahan
- Offensive coordinator: Gary Kubiak
- Defensive coordinator: Ray Rhodes
- Home stadium: Invesco Field at Mile High

Results
- Record: 8–8
- Division place: 3rd AFC West
- Playoffs: Did not qualify
- Pro Bowlers: WR Rod Smith; TE Dwayne Carswell; DT Trevor Pryce; ILB Al Wilson; CB Deltha O'Neal; K Jason Elam; ST Ian Gold

The 2001 season was the Denver Broncos' 32nd in the National Football League (NFL) and their 42nd overall. This was the Broncos' first year at the new Invesco Field at Mile High, replacing the old Mile High Stadium. The Broncos, heavily favored to be the AFC Super Bowl XXXVI representative, were aiming to head back to the Super Bowl for the first time in three years, and to win their third title in the Shanahan era. However, the season ended up as highly disappointing, as the team finished with an 8–8 record and missed the playoffs. The season was also a start of a multi-year investigation into the team cheating the salary cap during the 1996 season and both their Super Bowl-winning seasons. The team was stripped of their third-round pick in the 2002 draft, and received an initial fine of $968,000.

It was also Terrell Davis' final season before various knee ailments forced him to retire in the 2002 preseason.

== Offseason ==
=== NFL draft ===
2001 Denver Broncos draft
Round	Pick	Player	Position	College	Notes
1	24	Willie Middlebrooks	Cornerback	Minnesota	
2	51	Paul Toviessi	Defensive end	Marshall	from Tampa Bay via Buffalo (Note: #51: multiple trades: #51: Tampa Bay → Buffalo (D). see #14: Buffalo → Tampa Bay #51: Buffalo → Denver (D). Buffalo traded this pick to Denver for second-round (#58) and fourth-round (#110) selections.)
3	87	Reggie Hayward	Defensive end	Iowa State	
4	113	Ben Hamilton	Guard	Minnesota	from Green Bay (Note: #113: Green Bay → Denver (PD). Green Bay traded this selection to Denver in August 2000 in exchange for linebacker Nate Wayne.)
4	120	Nick Harris	Punter	California	
6	190	Kevin Kasper	Wide receiver	Iowa	
Made roster * Made at least one Pro Bowl during career

== Staff ==
2001 Denver Broncos staff
Front office: President and chief executive officer – Pat Bowlen; General manager – Neal Dahlen; Head coaches: Head coach/vice president of football operations – Mike Shanahan; Assistant head coach/offensive line – Alex Gibbs; Head coach's assistant – Zaven Yaralian; Offensive coaches: Offensive coordinator/quarterbacks – Gary Kubiak; Running backs – Bobby Turner; Wide receivers – Karl Dorrell; Tight ends – Brian Pariani; Offensive line – Rick Dennison; Offensive assistant – Pat McPherson	Defensive coaches: Defensive coordinator – Ray Rhodes; Defensive line – George Dyer; Linebackers – Larry Coyer; Defensive backs – Ron Milus; Safeties – David Gibbs; Defensive assistant – Steve Watson; Pass rush specialist – John Teerlinck; Special teams coaches: Special teams – Frank Bush; Special teams assistant – Anthony Lynn; Strength and conditioning: Strength and conditioning – Rich Tuten; Assistant strength and conditioning – Greg Saporta; Assistant strength and conditioning – Cedric Smith

== Roster ==
2001 Denver Broncos roster
Quarterbacks (QB): 14 Brian Griese; 8 Todd Husak; 17 Jarious Jackson; Running backs (RB): 38 Mike Anderson; 37 Tony Carter; 21 KaRon Coleman; 30 Terrell Davis; 42 Detron Smith FB; Wide receivers (WR): 84 Chris Cole KR; 82 Kevin Kasper KR; 85 Phil McGeoghan; 83 Scottie Montgomery; 80 Rod Smith; Tight ends (TE): 89 Dwayne Carswell; 88 Desmond Clark; 49 Matt Dominguez; 86 Patrick Hape	Offensive linemen (OL): 65 Cooper Carlisle T; 63 David Diaz-Infante; 64 Lennie Friedman G; 50 Ben Hamilton C/G; 79 Steve Herndon G; 78 Matt Lepsis T; 67 Michael Moore G; 66 Tom Nalen C; 62 Dan Neil G; 70 Trey Teague T; 72 Brandon Winey T; Defensive linemen (DL): 92 Bertrand Berry DE; 98 Reggie Hayward DE; 90 Jerry Johnson DT; 94 Leon Lett DE/DT; 75 Chester McGlockton DT; 93 Trevor Pryce DT; 99 Montae Reagor DT; 97 Keith Washington DE	Linebackers (LB): 55 Keith Burns MLB; 52 Ian Gold OLB; 51 John Mobley OLB; 53 Bill Romanowski OLB; 56 Al Wilson MLB; 54 Lee Woodall OLB; Defensive backs (DB): 26 Eric Brown FS; 48 George Coghill FS; 25 Eric Davis CB; 32 Delvin Hughley SS; 28 Kenoy Kennedy SS; 23 Willie Middlebrooks CB/S; 24 Deltha O'Neal CB/PR; 33 Jimmy Spencer CB; 27 Denard Walker CB; Special teams (ST): 1 Jason Elam K; 16 Tom Rouen P	Practice squad: 19 Ricky Hall WR; 31 Kelly Herndon CB; 39 Greg Brown S; 59 Donnie Spragan LB; 73 Cyron Brown DT; Reserve: 11 Steve Beuerlein QB (IR); 47 Darius Clark S (IR); 12 Gus Frerotte QB (IR); 22 Olandis Gary RB (IR); 29 Howard Griffith FB (IR); 87 Ed McCaffrey WR (IR); 95 Kavika Pittman DE (IR); 68 Paul Toviessi DE (IR); Rookies in italics 53 active, 8 reserve, 5 practice squad

== Regular season ==
The Broncos opened the 2001 NFL season with a Monday Night Football win over the New York Giants on September 10, 2001, in their new stadium, Invesco Field at Mile High. Wide receiver Ed McCaffrey suffered a season-ending injury with a broken leg. The late game and location would serve a role in sparing at least two lives the following day during the September 11th attacks.

=== Schedule ===
Week	Date	Opponent	Result	Record	Venue	Attendance
1	September 10	New York Giants	**W** 31–20	1–0	Invesco Field at Mile High	75,735
2 (Note: The Broncos were originally scheduled to play the Indianapolis Colts during Week 2 of the original NFL schedule (September 16) at RCA Dome in Indianapolis. However, due to the September 11 attacks, the game was rescheduled to Week 17.)	September 23	at Arizona Cardinals	**W** 38–17	2–0	Sun Devil Stadium	50,913
3	September 30	Baltimore Ravens	**L** 13–20	2–1	Invesco Field at Mile High	75,082
4	October 7	**Kansas City Chiefs**	**W** 20–6	3–1	Invesco Field at Mile High	75,037
5	October 14	at **Seattle Seahawks**	**L** 21–34	3–2	Husky Stadium	61,837
6	October 21	at **San Diego Chargers**	**L** 10–27	3–3	Qualcomm Stadium	67,521
7	October 28	New England Patriots	**W** 31–20	4–3	Invesco Field at Mile High	74,750
8	November 5	at **Oakland Raiders**	**L** 28–38	4–4	Network Associates Coliseum	62,637
9	November 11	**San Diego Chargers**	**W** 26–16	5–4	Invesco Field at Mile High	74,951
10	November 18	Washington Redskins	**L** 10–17	5–5	Invesco Field at Mile High	74,622
11	November 22	at Dallas Cowboys	**W** 26–24	6–5	Texas Stadium	64,104
12	December 2	at Miami Dolphins	**L** 10–21	6–6	Pro Player Stadium	73,938
13	December 9	**Seattle Seahawks**	**W** 20–7	7–6	Invesco Field at Mile High	74,524
14	December 16	at **Kansas City Chiefs**	**L** 23–26 (OT)	7–7	Arrowhead Stadium	77,778
15	Bye					
16	December 30	**Oakland Raiders**	**W** 23–17	8–7	Invesco Field at Mile High	75,582
17	January 6	at Indianapolis Colts	**L** 10–29	8–8	RCA Dome	56,192
Note: Intra-division opponents are in **bold** text.

=== Game summaries ===
==== Week 4: vs Kansas City Chiefs ====
Week 4: Kansas City Chiefs at Denver Broncos – Game summary

Quarter	1	2	3	4	Total
Chiefs	0	6	0	0	**6**
**Broncos**	7	3	3	7	**20**

at Invesco Field at Mile High, Denver, Colorado

- Date: October 7
- Game time: 2:05 p.m. MDT
- Game weather: Mostly cloudy, 74 °F (23 °C)
- Game attendance: 75,037
- Referee: Mike Carey
- TV announcers (CBS): Dick Enberg, Dan Dierdorf and Bonnie Bernstein
- Recap, Game Book

Game information

**First quarter**

- DEN – Mike Anderson 62-yard run (Jason Elam kick), 5:49. Broncos 7–0. **Drive: 3 plays, 80 yards, 1:10.**

**Second quarter**

- KC – Todd Peterson 23-yard field goal, 10:54. Broncos 7–3. **Drive: 8 plays, 29 yards, 3:50.**
- DEN – Jason Elam 48-yard field goal, 5:05. Broncos 10–3. **Drive: 11 plays, 38 yards, 5:49.**
- KC – Todd Peterson 35-yard field goal, 1:18. Broncos 10–6. **Drive: 13 plays, 70 yards, 3:47.**

**Third quarter**

- DEN – Jason Elam 24-yard field goal, 3:04. Broncos 13–6. **Drive: 14 plays, 74 yards, 8:17.**

**Fourth quarter**

- DEN – Rod Smith 4-yard pass from Brian Griese (Jason Elam kick), 8:11. Broncos 20–6. **Drive: 1 play, 4 yards, 0:05.**

**Top passers**

- KC – Trent Green – 25/40, 283 yards, 4 INT
- DEN – Brian Griese – 11/20, 121 yards, TD, INT

**Top rushers**

- KC – Priest Holmes – 17 rushes, 42 yards
- DEN – Mike Anderson – 22 rushes, 155 yards, TD

**Top receivers**

- KC – Tony Gonzalez – 8 receptions, 129 yards
- DEN – Rod Smith – 8 receptions, 110 yards, TD

==== Week 6: at San Diego Chargers ====
Week 6: Denver Broncos at San Diego Chargers – Game summary

Quarter	1	2	3	4	Total
Broncos	0	7	3	0	**10**
**Chargers**	7	6	7	7	**27**

at Qualcomm Stadium, San Diego, California

- Date: October 21
- Game time: 1:05 p.m. PDT
- Game weather: Clear, 66 °F (19 °C)
- Game attendance: 67,521
- Referee: Bill Leavy
- TV announcers (CBS): Greg Gumbel, Phil Simms and Armen Keteyian
- Box score, Game Book

Game information

**First quarter**

- SDG - Ronney Jenkins 88-yard kickoff return (Wade Richey kick), 14:43. Chargers 7–0.

**Second quarter**

- SDG – Wade Richey 21-yard field goal, 6:35. Chargers 10–0. **Drive: 8 plays, 50 yards, 3:27.**
- SDG – Wade Richey 51-yard field goal, 2:20. Chargers 13–0. **Drive: 6 plays, 11 yards, 1:41.**
- DEN – Desmond Clark 6-yard pass from Brian Griese (Jason Elam kick), 0:41. Chargers 13–7. **Drive: 10 plays, 64 yards, 1:39.**

**Third quarter**

- DEN – Jason Elam 45-yard field goal, 8:49. Chargers 13–10. **Drive: 14 plays, 65 yards, 6:11.**
- SDG – Jeff Graham 17-yard pass from Doug Flutie (Wade Richey kick), 2:17. Chargers 20–10. **Drive: 4 plays, 33 yards, 2:01.**

**Fourth quarter**

- SDG – Jeff Graham 20-yard pass from Doug Flutie (Wade Richey kick), 8:36. Chargers 27–10. **Drive: 5 plays, 38 yards, 2:16.**

**Top passers**

- DEN – Brian Griese – 26/41, 212 yards, TD, 2 INT
- SDG – Doug Flutie – 21/32, 280 yards, 2 TD, INT

**Top rushers**

- DEN – Mike Anderson – 11 rushes, 50 yards
- SDG – LaDainian Tomlinson – 25 rushes, 58 yards

**Top receivers**

- DEN – Rod Smith – 9 receptions, 86 yards
- SDG – Jeff Graham – 7 receptions, 107 yards, 2 TD

==== Week 7: vs New England Patriots ====
Week 7: New England Patriots at Denver Broncos – Game summary

Quarter	1	2	3	4	Total
Patriots	10	7	3	0	**20**
**Broncos**	7	3	14	7	**31**

at Invesco Field at Mile High, Denver, Colorado

- Date: October 28
- Game time: 12:15 p.m. MST/2:15 p.m. EST
- Game weather: Sunny, 72 °F (22 °C)
- Game attendance: 74,750
- Referee: Walt Coleman
- TV announcers (CBS): Don Criqui & Steve Tasker

Game information

**First quarter**

- NE – Adam Vinatieri 24-yard field goal, 9:06. Patriots 3–0. **Drive: 10 plays, 74 yards, 5:54.**
- NE – David Patten 30-yard pass from Tom Brady (Adam Vinatieri kick), 4:57. Patriots 10–0. **Drive: 4 plays, 69 yards, 2:01.**
- DEN – Mike Anderson 8-yard run (Jason Elam kick), 0:57. Patriots 10–7. **Drive: 7 plays, 80 yards, 4:00.**

**Second quarter**

- DEN – Jason Elam 50-yard field goal, 4:03. Tied 10–10. **Drive: 17 plays, 66 yards, 8:40.**
- NE – Troy Brown 5-yard pass from Tom Brady (Adam Vinatieri kick), 1:21. Patriots 17–10. **Drive: 3 plays, 17 yards, 0:49.**

**Third quarter**

- NE – Adam Vinatieri 44-yard field goal, 10:59. Patriots 20–10. **Drive: 4 plays, −2 yards, 2:39.**
- DEN – Rod Smith 65-yard pass from Brian Griese (Jason Elam kick), 10:35. Patriots 20–17. **Drive: 1 play, 65 yards, 0:24.**
- DEN – Dwayne Carswell 6-yard pass from Brian Griese (Jason Elam kick), 3:35. Broncos 24–20. **Drive: 9 plays, 80 yards, 3:10.**

**Fourth quarter**

- DEN – Denard Walker 39-yard interception return (Jason Elam kick), 2:24. Broncos 31–20.

**Top passers**

- NE – Tom Brady – 25/38, 203 yards, 2 TD, 4 INT
- DEN – Brian Griese – 19/30, 283 yards, 2 TD, 2 INT

**Top rushers**

- NE – Antowain Smith – 12 rushes, 56 yards
- DEN – Mike Anderson – 14 rushes, 40 yards, TD

**Top receivers**

- NE – Troy Brown – 9 receptions, 86 yards, TD
- DEN – Rod Smith – 6 receptions, 159 yards, TD

==== Week 9: vs San Diego Chargers ====
Week 9: San Diego Chargers at Denver Broncos – Game summary

Quarter	1	2	3	4	Total
Chargers	0	0	3	13	**16**
**Broncos**	3	17	6	0	**26**

at Invesco Field, Denver, Colorado

- Date: November 11
- Game time: 2:05 p.m. MST
- Game weather: Partly Sunny, 62 °F (17 °C)
- Game attendance: 74,951
- Referee: Bill Carollo
- TV announcers (CBS): Dick Enberg, Dan Dierdorf and Bonnie Bernstein
- Box score, Game Book

Game information

**First quarter**

- DEN – Jason Elam 25-yard field goal, 6:35. Broncos 3–0. **Drive: 13 plays, 62 yards, 6:38.**

**Second quarter**

- DEN – Jason Elam 29-yard field goal, 8:02. Broncos 6–0. **Drive: 11 plays, 69 yards, 5:10.**
- DEN – Desmond Clark 18-yard pass from Brian Griese (Jason Elam kick), 1:07. Broncos 13–0. **Drive: 9 plays, 77 yards, 3:26.**
- DEN – Dwayne Carswell 3-yard pass from Brian Griese (Jason Elam kick), 0:28. Broncos 20–0. **Drive: 1 play, 3 yards, 0:04.**

**Third quarter**

- DEN – Jason Elam 26-yard field goal, 11:54. Broncos 23–0. **Drive: 4 plays, 1 yard, 1:26.**
- SDG – Wade Richey 29-yard field goal, 9:42. Broncos 23–3. **Drive: 4 plays, 3 yards, 2:12.**
- DEN – Jason Elam 33-yard field goal, 5:38. Broncos 26–3. **Drive: 8 plays, 37 yards, 4:04.**

**Fourth quarter**

- SDG – Curtis Conway 72-yard pass from Doug Flutie (Wade Richey kick), 14:50. Broncos 26–10. **Drive: 2 plays, 80 yards, 0:58.**
- SDG – Raylee Johnson 45-yard fumble return (run failed), 10:57. Broncos 26–16.

**Top passers**

- SDG – Doug Flutie – 12/31, 165 yards, TD, 4 INT
- DEN – Brian Griese – 21/31, 224 yards, 2 TD

**Top rushers**

- SDG – LaDainian Tomlinson – 14 rushes, 75 yards
- DEN – Terrell Davis – 33 rushes, 83 yards

**Top receivers**

- SDG – Curtis Conway – 3 receptions, 111 yards, TD
- DEN – Rod Smith – 5 receptions, 74 yards

==== Week 11: at Dallas Cowboys ====
Week 11: Denver Broncos at Dallas Cowboys

Quarter	1	2	3	4	Total
**Broncos**	3	14	6	3	**26**
Cowboys	3	0	0	21	**24**

at Texas Stadium, Irving, Texas

- Date: November 22, 2001
- Game time: 2:15 p.m. MST/3:15 p.m. CST
- Game weather: Overcast, 72 °F (22 °C)
- Game attendance: 64,104
- TV announcers (CBS): Greg Gumbel, Phil Simms and Armen Keteyian

Game information

**First quarter**

**Second quarter**

**Third quarter**

**Fourth quarter**

Top passers

- DEN – Brian Griese – 17/29, 171 yards, TD, INT
- DAL – Ryan Leaf – 16/32, 193 yards

Top rushers

- DEN – Mike Anderson – 33 rushes, 118 yards, TD
- DAL – Troy Hambrick – 5 rushes, 17 yards

Top receivers

- DEN – Rod Smith – 7 receptions, 81 yards
- DAL – Joey Galloway – 6 receptions, 64 yards

== Standings ==
AFC West
	W	L	T	PCT	PF	PA	STK
^{(3)} Oakland Raiders	10	6	0	.625	399	327	L3
Seattle Seahawks	9	7	0	.563	301	324	W2
Denver Broncos	8	8	0	.500	340	339	L1
Kansas City Chiefs	6	10	0	.375	320	344	L1
San Diego Chargers	5	11	0	.313	332	321	L9
