= Leonardo Carson =

American football player (born 1977)

No. 96, 91
- Position: Defensive tackle

Personal information
- Born: February 11, 1977 (age 49); Mobile, Alabama, U.S.
- Listed height: 6 ft 2 in (1.88 m)
- Listed weight: 305 lb (138 kg)

Career information
- High school: Shaw (Mobile)
- College: Auburn
- NFL draft: 2000: 4th round, 113th overall pick

Career history
- San Diego Chargers (2000–2003); Dallas Cowboys (2003–2004)

Awards and highlights
- First-team All-SEC (1998)

Career NFL statistics
- Games played: 64
- Total tackles: 129
- Sacks: 8.5
- Fumble recoveries: 5
- Pass deflections: 7
- Stats at Pro Football Reference

Leonardo Tremayne Carson (born February 11, 1977) is an American former professional football player who was a defensive tackle in the National Football League (NFL) for the San Diego Chargers and Dallas Cowboys. He played college football for the Auburn Tigers.

== Early life ==
Carson attended Shaw High School in Mobile, Alabama. He played five different positions (linebacker, tight end, fullback, wide receiver and quarterback) and was the starting quarterback in his last 2 years. As a senior, he recorded 934 passing yards for 7 touchdowns, 1,104 rushing yards for 12 touchdowns, receiving All-state and All-American honors.

== College career ==
He accepted a football scholarship from Auburn University with the intention of playing tight end. In July 1996, he was sentenced to 60 days in jail, for his role in the break-in of a car in March, but was able to be placed on probation and serve only 6 days.

Carson was converted into a defensive tackle as a true freshman, before being moved to defensive end when Shannon Shuttle was lost for the year. He started the last 4 games of the season, while registering 32 tackles (2 for loss), 4.5 sacks and 2 fumble recoveries.

As a sophomore, he started 13 games, tallying 59 tackles (9 for loss), 2 sacks, 2 passes defensed, 2 forced fumbles and one fumble recovery. As a junior, he posted 90 tackles (8 for loss), 8.5 sacks, one interception, 2 passes defensed, one forced fumble and one fumble recovery.

His stats were impacted in his last season when he was moved to defensive tackle, tallying 43 tackles (28 for loss), 2 sacks, one interception and one forced fumble. He finished his career with 224 tackles (47 for loss), 17 sacks, 4 passes defensed, 2 interceptions, 4 forced fumbles and 4 fumble recoveries.

== Professional career ==
=== San Diego Chargers ===
Carson was selected by the San Diego Chargers in the fourth round (113th overall) of the 2000 NFL draft. As a rookie, he appeared in 4 of the first 10 games, making 2 tackles. On November 17, he was placed on the injured reserve list with a tore right rotator cuff.

In 2001, he started 13 games at defensive tackle, after replacing Jamal Williams who tore the ACL in his left knee. He posted 33 tackles, 3 sacks, 3 passes defensed and 2 fumble recoveries.

In 2002, he began the season as a backup, but started the last 6 games after Williams suffered a season-ending ankle injury, posting 31 tackles, 3.5 sacks, 3 passes defensed and one fumble recovery.

On August 21, 2003, he was arrested for breaking into an apartment and was later sued on September 30. He appeared in 5 games as a backup defensive tackle, making 2 tackles and one pass defensed. He was waived on October 14.

=== Dallas Cowboys ===
On October 18, 2003, he was signed as a free agent by the Dallas Cowboys. He was a backup defensive tackle, registering 21 tackles (1 for loss), 1.5 sacks and 2 quarterback pressures. He tore his right triceps muscle against the Washington Redskins and was placed on the injured reserve list on December 16.

Carson was re-signed for the 2004 season, although he served 8 days in jail in June and was suspended for the opening game by the NFL for his previous legal problems and the violation of the player conduct policy. He passed Willie Blade on the depth chart and started 15 games alongside Pro Bowler La'Roi Glover. He posted 55 tackles (seventh on the team), 5 tackles for loss (tied for the team lead), 8 quarterback pressures, one fumble recovery and a half sack.

Although large and physically talented, his productivity as a player was often average, and head coach Bill Parcells, who initially lauded his arrival to the team, stated in several press conferences that he'd lost confidence in Carson.

He signed a one-year contract with the Cowboys for the 2005 season, but was released on September 1, after being passed on the depth chart by rookie Jay Ratliff.

== NFL career statistics ==
Legend
**Bold**	Career high

Year	Team	Games		Tackles					Interceptions					Fumbles			
Year	Team	GP	GS	Cmb	Solo	Ast	Sck	TFL	Int	Yds	TD	Lng	PD	FF	FR	Yds	TD
2000	SDG	4	0	2	2	0	0.0	1	0	0	0	0	0	0	0	0	0
2001	SDG	**16**	13	33	24	9	3.0	**7**	0	0	0	0	**3**	0	**2**	0	0
2002	SDG	**16**	7	31	22	9	**3.5**	2	0	0	0	0	**3**	0	1	0	0
2003	SDG	5	0	2	2	0	0.0	0	0	0	0	0	1	0	0	0	0
2003	DAL	8	0	18	13	5	1.5	2	0	0	0	0	0	0	1	0	0
2004	DAL	15	**15**	**43**	**29**	**14**	0.5	4	0	0	0	0	0	0	1	0	0
		64	35	129	92	37	8.5	16	0	0	0	0	7	0	5	0	0

== Personal life ==
Beginning June 14, 2004, Carson began serving a 30-day sentence at the Mobile County Metro Jail on two misdemeanor counts of kidnapping and burglary relating to an August 2003 incident where he broke into the home of his ex-girlfriend's sister, Tasha Locke. He forced her to leave with him, but later that evening, Carson's car broke down, and Locke escaped.

In June 2010, Carson was sentenced to ten years in prison for selling drugs, while living in Mobile, Alabama.
