= Derrick Harris (American football) =

American football player (born 1972)

No. 34, 33, 40
- Position: Running back

Personal information
- Born: September 18, 1972 (age 54); Angleton, Texas, U.S.
- Listed height: 6 ft 0 in (1.83 m)
- Listed weight: 253 lb (115 kg)

Career information
- High school: Willowridge (Houston, Texas)
- College: Miami (FL)
- NFL draft: 1996: 6th round, 175th overall pick

Career history
- St. Louis Rams (1996–1999); San Diego Chargers (2000); New Orleans Saints (2001)*; San Diego Chargers (2001); Dallas Cowboys (2002)*
- * Offseason or practice squad member only

Awards and highlights
- Super Bowl champion (XXXIV)

Career NFL statistics
- Rushing yards: 43
- Rushing average: 2.5
- Receptions: 17
- Receiving yards: 81
- Total touchdowns: 3
- Stats at Pro Football Reference

Sidney Derrick Harris (born September 18, 1972) is an American former professional football player who was a running back for four seasons with the St. Louis Rams and San Diego Chargers of the National Football League (NFL). He played college football for the Miami Hurricanes and was selected in the sixth round of the 1996 NFL draft with the 175th overall pick.

Harris had two receiving touchdowns for the 1998 St. Louis Rams; he had twelve of his career thirteen NFL catches in 1998. His other and final NFL touchdown came when he returned a blocked punt at New England on October 14, 2001, giving San Diego a 26–16 lead. (New England came back, tying the game in the final minute and then winning in overtime. The game-winning 46 yard field goal was the first of three overtime game winners for Adam Vinatieri during the 2001 regular season and playoffs. With the win, New England climbed to 2–3, barely avoiding a 1–4 start. The game marked the first come from behind win in Tom Brady's career, but the blocked punt, and his reaction to it, resulted in punter Lee Johnson's release following the game. Just four games earlier, Johnson had become the all-time leader in punting yardage, a feat made possible by some inferior Cincinnati Bengals and New England Patriots offenses over the course of Johnson's career.) Harris played in all 16 games with the 2001 Chargers, but would not play in the NFL again after 2001.
