= Jason Perry (safety) =

American football player (born 1976)

No. 31
- Position: Safety

Personal information
- Born: August 1, 1976 (age 50); Passaic, New Jersey, U.S.
- Listed height: 6 ft 0 in (1.83 m)
- Listed weight: 245 lb (111 kg)

Career information
- High school: Paterson Catholic (Paterson, New Jersey)
- College: North Carolina State
- NFL draft: 1999: 4th round, 104th overall pick

Career history
- San Diego Chargers (1999–2001); Minnesota Vikings (2002); Cincinnati Bengals (2002); Amsterdam Admirals (2004); New England Patriots (2004)*
- * Offseason or practice squad member only

Awards and highlights
- NFL All-Rookie Team (1999)

Career NFL statistics
- Interceptions: 2
- INT yards: 37
- Touchdowns: 2
- Stats at Pro Football Reference

Jason Perry (born August 1, 1976) is an American former professional football player who was a safety in the National Football League (NFL). He played in the NFL from 1999 to 2002. He was selected in the fourth round of the 1999 NFL draft with the 104th overall pick.

Perry was born in Passaic, New Jersey and attended Paterson Catholic High School.

Perry was also an accomplished hurdler for the NC State Wolfpack track and field team, placing 8th in the 110 m hurdles at the 1997 NCAA Division I Outdoor Track and Field Championships.
