= Mike Anderson (running back) =

American football player and US Marine (born 1973)

No. 38
- Position: Running back

Personal information
- Born: September 21, 1973 (age 53); Winnsboro, South Carolina, U.S.
- Listed height: 6 ft 0 in (1.83 m)
- Listed weight: 230 lb (104 kg)

Career information
- High school: Fairfield Central (Winnsboro)
- College: Mt. San Jacinto (1996–1997); Utah (1998–1999)
- NFL draft: 2000: 6th round, 189th overall pick

Career history
- Denver Broncos (2000–2005); Baltimore Ravens (2006–2007)

Awards and highlights
- NFL Offensive Rookie of the Year (2000); PFWA All-Rookie Team (2000); First-team All-MW (1999)

Career NFL statistics
- Rushing attempts: 919
- Rushing yards: 4,067
- Rushing touchdowns: 37
- Receptions: 92
- Receiving yards: 727
- Receiving touchdowns: 5
- Military career
- Allegiance: United States
- Branch: United States Marine Corps
- Service years: 1992–1996
- Rank: Lance corporal
- Stats at Pro Football Reference

Michael Moschello Anderson (born September 21, 1973) is an American former professional football player who was a running back for seven seasons in the National Football League (NFL). He played college football for the Utah Utes and was selected by the Denver Broncos in the sixth round of the 2000 NFL draft. He played five seasons with the Broncos, being named the AP NFL Offensive Rookie of the Year in 2000. After being waived by the Broncos in 2006, Anderson signed a four-year contract with the Baltimore Ravens; however, he played just two seasons with the Ravens before his contract was terminated in 2008, effectively ending his NFL career.

Prior to his football career, Anderson served four years in the United States Marine Corps, enlisting out of high school. He was assigned to the artillery battery of the 11th Marine Regiment and deployed overseas to Somalia and Kenya on peacekeeping missions. He was honorably discharged from the Marines in 1996 as a lance corporal.

== High school ==
Anderson is a graduate of Fairfield Central High School in Winnsboro, South Carolina, where he did not compete in sports.

== Military service ==
Anderson spent four years in the United States Marine Corps upon completion of high school in order to earn educational benefits and in consideration of a possible military career. While in the Marine Corps at Camp Pendleton, he played on the 11th Marines contact football team, where he was seen by an assistant coach for Mt. San Jacinto Junior College.

== College career ==
Anderson attended Mt. San Jacinto Junior College for two years. As a freshman, helped his team win the L.A. Bowl with 1,511 rushing yards. He won the California State JUCO Player of the Year after rushing for 1,686 yards as a sophomore. Anderson went on to become a two-time all-conference player at the University of Utah where he was a teammate of former Baltimore Ravens and Carolina Panthers star wide receiver Steve Smith. Anderson finished his two-year career with the best per-game rushing average in school history (102.4 avg.)

== NFL career ==
=== Denver Broncos ===
Anderson played five seasons for the Denver Broncos. In his first season in 2000, he ended up with 1,487 yards and received the franchise’s first NFL Offensive Rookie of the Year Award. He set several franchise records on December 3 at New Orleans with 37 carries for 251 yards and four touchdowns. He also had games with 187 and 195 yards, the only rookie in NFL history with three 175+ yard games. He was plagued by injuries in the following years, not even playing in 2004, the result of tearing both groin muscles while blocking on a punt return in the waning moments of a preseason game. The 2005 NFL season was a return to form. He rushed for 1,014 yards in 15 games. In reaching his second 1,000-yard rushing season, Anderson set several modern-day NFL records (longest stretch between seasons leading a team in rushing, longest stretch between a player's first and second 1,000-yard rushing seasons, and greatest number of seasons passed between 1,000-yard rushing seasons with no intervening seasons rushing for that distance). On March 1, 2006, Anderson was waived by the Broncos to avoid exceeding the salary cap.

As of 2017's NFL off-season, Anderson held at least 11 Broncos franchise records, including:

- Rush Attempts: rookie season (297 in 2000), rookie game (37 on 2000-12-03 @NOR; with Olandis Gary)
- Rush Yards: game and rookie game (251 on 2000-12-03 @NOR)
- Rushing TDs: rookie season (15 in 2000; with Clinton Portis), rookie game (4 on 2000-12-03 @NOR)
- Total TDs: rookie game (4 on 2000-12-03 @NOR; with Clinton Portis)
- Yds from Scrimmage: game and rookie game (256 on 2000-12-03 @NOR)
- Games with 2+ TD scored: rookie season (5; with Clinton Portis)
- Games with 3+ TD scored: rookie season (1; with Jon Keyworth, Terrell Davis, and Clinton Portis)

=== Baltimore Ravens ===
On March 12, 2006, Anderson and the Ravens agreed on a contract. During the 2006 season, he was third string behind Jamal Lewis and Musa Smith. He finished 2006 with 39 carries for 143 yards and 1 touchdown, as well as 9 receptions for 54 yards. On February 27, 2008, the Ravens released him, ending his NFL career.

== NFL career statistics ==
Legend
**Bold**	Career high

Year	Team	Games		Rushing					Receiving				
Year	Team	GP	GS	Att	Yds	Avg	Lng	TD	Rec	Yds	Avg	Lng	TD
2000	DEN	16	12	**297**	**1,487**	**5.0**	**80**	**15**	**23**	169	7.3	18	0
2001	DEN	16	7	175	678	3.9	62	4	8	46	5.8	16	0
2002	DEN	15	12	84	386	4.6	32	2	18	167	9.3	52	**2**
2003	DEN	12	5	70	257	3.7	44	3	12	53	4.4	18	**2**
2004	DEN	0	0	Did not play due to injury									
2005	DEN	15	15	239	1,014	4.2	44	12	18	**212**	**11.8**	**66**	1
2006	BAL	16	0	39	183	4.7	34	1	9	54	6.0	13	0
2007	BAL	8	0	15	62	4.1	16	0	4	26	6.5	10	0
Career		98	51	919	4,067	4.4	80	37	92	727	7.9	66	5
