= Jamal Williams =

American football player (born 1976)

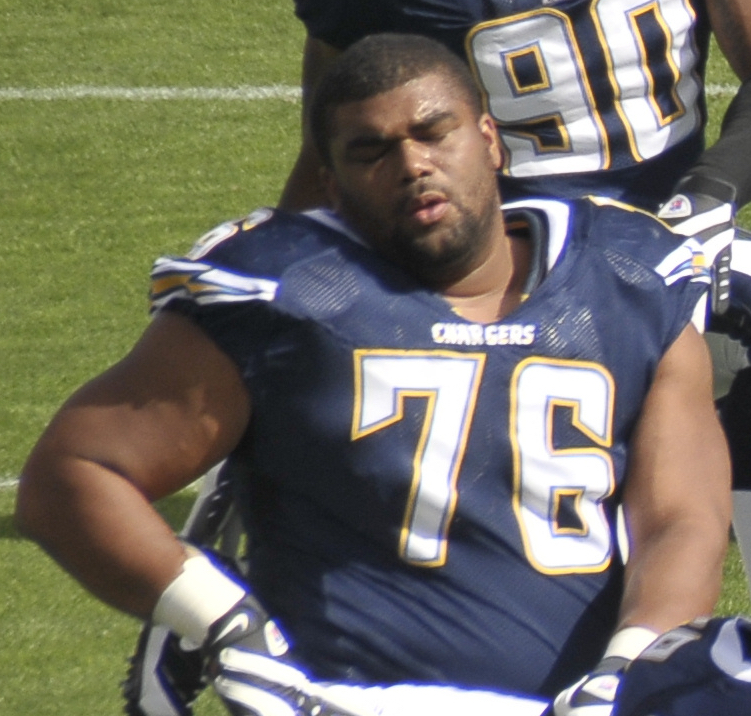
- Williams with the San Diego Chargers in 2008

No. 76
- Position: Nose tackle

Personal information
- Born: April 28, 1976 (age 50); Washington, D.C., U.S.
- Listed height: 6 ft 3 in (1.91 m)
- Listed weight: 348 lb (158 kg)

Career information
- High school: Archbishop Carroll (Washington, D.C.)
- College: Oklahoma State
- Supplemental draft: 1998: 2nd round

Career history
- San Diego Chargers (1998–2009); Denver Broncos (2010)

Awards and highlights
- 2× First-team All-Pro (2005, 2006); 3× Pro Bowl (2005–2007); Los Angeles Chargers Hall of Fame; San Diego Chargers 50th Anniversary Team; First-team All-Big 12 (1997)

Career NFL statistics
- Tackles: 443
- Sacks: 13
- Forced fumbles: 4
- Fumble recoveries: 3
- Passes defended: 22
- Interceptions: 1
- Defensive touchdowns: 1
- Stats at Pro Football Reference

Jamal Williams (born April 28, 1976) is an American former professional football player who was a nose tackle in the National Football League (NFL) for thirteen seasons. He was selected by the San Diego Chargers in the second round of the 1998 Supplemental Draft. He played college football for Oklahoma State Cowboys. After three consecutive All-Pro seasons (2004, 2005, 2006) in the NFL.

== Early life ==
Born in Washington, D. C., Williams was one of seven children. He was raised in Washington and Louisville, Kentucky, by his mother Harriet, a juvenile corrections officer in Louisville. As a senior at Archbishop Carroll High School in Washington, Williams earned Super Prep All-American honors in 1993.

Williams attended Oklahoma State University. A sociology major, he played for the Cowboys in 1995 and 1997 under head coach Bob Simmons.

Due to academic ineligibility at Oklahoma State, Williams transferred to Kemper Military School and Junior College in 1996. He returned to Oklahoma State in the 1997 spring semester. Williams did not play football at Kemper, in order to "focus on academics," reported The Oklahoman. For the 1997 season, he was a first-team All-Big 12 Conference selection. He finished his college career with 117 tackles and 9.5 sacks.

In February 1998, Simmons suspended Williams indefinitely due to an unspecified violation of team rules. Although Williams did not declare for the 1998 NFL draft, he applied for the supplemental draft "because of academic reasons," reported Reuters in July 1998.

== Professional career ==
=== San Diego Chargers ===
Williams was selected in the second round of the 1998 NFL supplemental draft by the San Diego Chargers. As a rookie in 1998, he played nine games with 6 tackles (5 solo), 1 pass deflection, and 1 interception returned for a touchdown. In 1999, he recorded 26 tackles (22 solo), 1 sack, and 2 pass deflections in 16 games (2 starts). In 2000, Williams finished with 52 tackles (45 solo), 1 sack, and 1 forced fumble in 16 starts.

He suffered a season-ending injury in the 3rd game of the 2001 season and finished with just 2 solo tackles. However, he worked his way back into the starting line-up in 2002, earning the Ed Block Courage Award for his efforts. Williams recorded 23 tackles (19 solo), 2.5 sacks, 1 forced fumble, and 2 pass deflections in 12 games during the 2002 season. During the 2003 season, Williams posted totals of 33 tackles (24 solo), 1 sack, 1 forced fumble, and 1 pass deflection in 15 games.

The Chargers switched to a 3-4 defensive scheme in 2004 and fielded Williams at nose tackle, arguably the most important position in the 3-4 defense. Williams recorded 32 tackles (25 solo), 4 sacks, and 4 pass deflections in 15 games. He became widely recognized as one of the top 3-4 nose tackles in the NFL and was named an AP 2nd Team All-Pro, and was also selected as the Chargers' Defensive Player of the Year as well as Lineman of the Year. In the 2005 season, Williams recorded 53 tackles (40 solo) and 4 pass deflections in 16 games and was named a Pro Bowl starter and was named first-team All-Pro by the Associated Press and The Sporting News, He Again Was Selected Chargers Defensive Player of the year And Lineman of the year for the Second Time in his Career. He finished the 2006 season with 69 tackles (49 solo), 2 sacks, and 2 pass deflections in 16 games and was again named a Pro Bowl starter, as well as first-team All-Pro by the AP, The Sporting News, and the Football Writers Association of America, And Was selected Chargers Lineman of the Year for the Third time in his Career.

In 2007, Peter King of Sports Illustrated ranked Williams 17th out of the 500 best active NFL players.

During the 2007 season, Williams recorded 39 tackles (32 solo), 1 forced fumble, and 2 pass deflections in 13 games and was named a Pro Bowl reserve following the season. Williams finished 2008 with 56 tackles (46 solo), 1.5 sacks, and 3 pass deflections in 16 games, Williams Was Selected Chargers Defensive Player of the Year (For The Third Time In his Career), Lineman of the Year (For The fourth Time In His Career) And Co-Most Valuable Player With Philip Rivers. In 2009, Williams suffered a season-ending triceps injury in the first game and finished with just 3 solo tackles. He was named to the Chargers 50th Anniversary Team that year. On March 4, 2010, Williams was released by the Chargers.

Williams was inducted into the Chargers Hall of Fame in 2022.

=== Denver Broncos ===
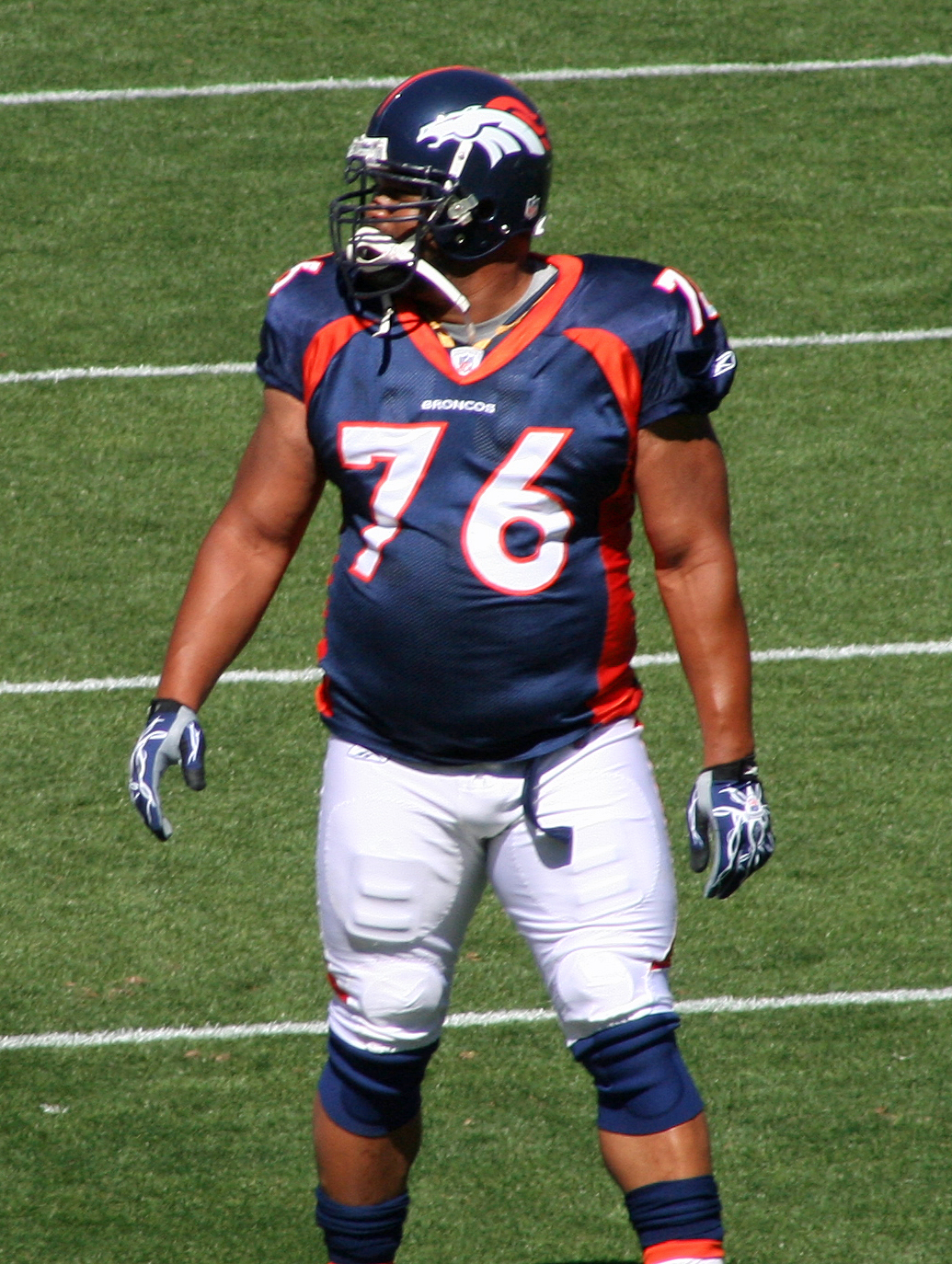
At a game in Denver in September 2010.

On March 9, 2010, Williams signed a 3-year, $16-million contract with the Broncos with $7-million guaranteed and an additional $6-million available through incentives.

On March 3, 2011, the Broncos released Williams.

== NFL career statistics ==
Legend
**Bold**	Career high

=== Regular season ===
Year	Team	Games		Tackles				Interceptions				Fumbles			
Year	Team	GP	GS	Comb	Solo	Ast	Sck	Int	Yds	TD	Lng	FF	FR	Yds	TD
1998	SDG	9	0	6	5	1	0.0	**1**	**14**	**1**	**14**	0	0	0	0
1999	SDG	16	2	26	22	4	1.0	0	0	0	0	0	0	0	0
2000	SDG	16	16	53	46	7	1.0	0	0	0	0	**1**	0	0	0
2001	SDG	3	3	2	2	0	0.0	0	0	0	0	0	**1**	0	0
2002	SDG	12	10	24	20	4	2.5	0	0	0	0	**1**	0	0	0
2003	SDG	15	15	33	24	9	1.0	0	0	0	0	**1**	0	0	0
2004	SDG	15	15	32	25	7	**4.0**	0	0	0	0	0	0	0	0
2005	SDG	16	16	53	40	13	0.0	0	0	0	0	0	**1**	0	0
2006	SDG	16	16	**69**	**49**	**20**	2.0	0	0	0	0	0	0	0	0
2007	SDG	13	13	39	32	7	0.0	0	0	0	0	**1**	**1**	0	0
2008	SDG	16	15	56	46	10	1.5	0	0	0	0	0	0	0	0
2009	SDG	1	1	3	3	0	0.0	0	0	0	0	0	0	0	0
2010	DEN	16	16	47	31	16	0.0	0	0	0	0	0	0	0	0
Career		164	138	443	345	98	13.0	1	14	1	14	4	3	0	0

=== Playoffs ===
Year	Team	Games		Tackles				Interceptions				Fumbles			
Year	Team	GP	GS	Comb	Solo	Ast	Sck	Int	Yds	TD	Lng	FF	FR	Yds	TD
2004	SDG	1	1	0	0	0	0.0	0	0	0	0	0	0	0	0
2006	SDG	1	1	3	**3**	0	0.0	0	0	0	0	0	0	0	0
2007	SDG	3	3	6	2	4	0.0	0	0	0	0	0	0	0	0
2008	SDG	2	2	**9**	2	**7**	0.0	0	0	0	0	0	0	0	0
Career		7	7	18	7	11	0.0	0	0	0	0	0	0	0	0

== Personal life ==
From 1999 to 2002, Williams was married to Surel Davis. They have two children.
