= Dwayne Carswell =

American football player (born 1972)

No. 89, 77
- Position: Tight end

Personal information
- Born: January 18, 1972 (age 54); Jacksonville, Florida, U.S.
- Listed height: 6 ft 3 in (1.91 m)
- Listed weight: 290 lb (132 kg)

Career information
- High school: University Christian School (Jacksonville, Florida)
- College: Liberty
- NFL draft: 1994: undrafted

Career history
- Denver Broncos (1994–2006); Orlando Predators (2007)*
- * Offseason or practice squad member only

Awards and highlights
- 2× Super Bowl champion (XXXII, XXXIII); Pro Bowl (2001)

Career NFL statistics
- Receptions: 192
- Receiving yards: 1,707
- Receiving touchdowns: 15
- Stats at Pro Football Reference

Dwayne Carswell (born January 18, 1972) is an American former professional football player who was a tight end from 1994 to 2005 for the Denver Broncos in the National Football League (NFL). He was originally signed as an undrafted rookie free agent by the Broncos in 1994. He played college football at Liberty University.

Carswell won two Super Bowl rings with the Broncos in 1998 and 1999 and was selected to the Pro Bowl in 2001. His first career reception came on a five-yard pass from Hall of Fame quarterback John Elway. Carswell received the Ed Block Courage Award, after suffering internal injuries in October 2005, in a car crash in Aurora, Colorado. Carswell was signed by the Orlando Predators of the Arena Football League in January 2007. However, he was waived the next month.

== Early life ==
Carswell was born in Jacksonville, Florida and attended Temple High School and University Christian School where he was an All-State selection as a junior and senior. He was named Second-team All-State as a sophomore at Temple and also earned All-Conference, All-District and All-County honors during his high school career as a safety, running back and wide receiver. He was also named in 1999 to the "Top 100 Athletes of Jacksonville" list.

== College career ==
Carswell then attended Liberty University, where he played both running back for two seasons and tight end for his final two seasons. As a sophomore in 1991, he recorded 435 rushing yards and five touchdowns. As a senior, he recorded 32 receptions for 259 yards. He finished his career with 65 receptions for 511 yards and two touchdowns. While at Liberty, Carswell was coached at Liberty by former Cleveland Browns' head coach Sam Rutigliano.

== Professional career ==
Carswell went undradted in the 1994 NFL draft, however, on May 3, he was signed by the Denver Broncos. He was later waived by the team on August 26, to be re-signed to the teams' practice squad four days later.

=== Early career ===
He spent the first 11 weeks of the season on the practice squad until he was signed to the active roster on November 25. He made his NFL debut on November 27, 1994, against the Cincinnati Bengals, during the game he played on special teams. In 1995, Carswell was inactive for seven of the Broncos' first 13 games before making his first career start against the Seattle Seahawks on December 10, when he replaced Shannon Sharpe, who had an eye injury. Carwell's first career reception came on a five-yard pass from John Elway in the second quarter. For the season, he recorded three receptions for 37 yards (12.3 avg.) and two special-teams tackles. In 1996, Carswell played in all 16 of the Broncos regular season games and started one at tight end in place of Sharpe. Most of Carswell's playing time during the regular season came on special teams and as the backup tight end on offense. He finished the season with 15 receptions for 85 yards (5.7 avg.) and five special-teams tackles.

In 1997, Carswell played mostly in a reserve role at tight end and on special teams in all 16 games and made three starts at tight end. He finished the season with 12 receptions for 96 yards (8.0 avg.) and scored his first career touchdown on a 24-yard reception from Elway against the St. Louis Rams on September 14. On January 25, he recorded one receptions for four-yards in a 31–24 win over the Green Bay Packers in Super Bowl XXXII. In 1998, Carswell played all 16 games, making one start, as the backup tight end and recorded four receptions for 51 yards. In 1999, Carswell became more of a contributor on offense, than in years past. He played in all the regular season games, starting the last 11, catching 24 passes for 201 yards (8.4 avg.) with two touchdowns while also contributing on special teams.

=== Replacing Shannon Sharpe ===
In 2000, Carswell started all 16 regular season games and set career highs in every receiving category by finishing third on the team with 49 receptions for 495 yards (10.1 avg.) and three touchdowns. And in 2001, Carswell started all 16 regular-games, recording 34 receptions for 299 yds. (8.8 avg.) and a career-high four touchdowns. For his performance, he was selected to his first, and only Pro Bowl.

=== Later career ===
In 2002, with the return of Shannon Sharpe, who had played the previous two seasons with the Baltimore Ravens, Carswell returned to being the Broncos backup, blocking tight end. For the season, he played all 16 regular-season games, with seven starts, four coming when the Broncos opened the game in a two-tight end set three while replacing the injured Sharpe. In 2003, Carswell played all 16 regular-season games, with 10 starts, nine when the team started the game in a two tight end set and one replacing an inactive Sharpe. For the season, Carswell recorded six receptions for 53 yards (8.8 avg.) with a touchdown. Nine starts came when the Broncos opened games in a two-tight end set, and his other came at Green Bay on December 28 in place of the inactive Shannon Sharpe. In 2004, Carswell spent training camp playing at offensive tackle, however he was later switched to tight end. He appeared in 15 regular-season games with 14 starts and recorded 22 receptions for 198 yards (9.0 avg.) and one touchdown. In certain formations, he was also used as an H-back. He missed the Broncos game at Cincinnati on October 18 because he was suspended by the commissioner. The suspension was lifted on October 26.

In 2005, Carswell was switched to offensive guard during training camp, however he received playing time as an eligible receiver in goal line situations in all seven games he played. He recorded two touchdown receptions against the Jacksonville Jaguars on October 2. Becoming the first offensive lineman in the Super Bowl era, since 1966, to record two touchdown receptions in the same game. When he was placed on the reserve/non-football injury list, he was tied for second on the team with two touchdown receptions. On September 1, 2006, Carswell was released by the Broncos. On January 24, 2007, Carswell signed with the Orlando Predators of the Arena Football League. However, he was waived on February 18.

=== Car accident ===
On October 27, 2005, Carswell was involved in a five-car crash in Aurora, Colorado. The 1994 Chevrolet Caprice he was driving in was traveling in the southbound direction when a collision in the northbound lanes, at the intersection of Parker Road and Hampden Avenue, of the road spilled into the southbound lanes. As a result of the accident, Carswell sustained broken ribs and other internal injuries. He was placed on the reserve/non-football injury list on October 31. He was later discharged from the Medical Center of Aurora on November 4. As a result of his recovery from his injuries, Carswell earned the Broncos' Ed Block Courage Award for his recovery from the accident.

== Personal life ==
Carswell, whose nickname is "House", resides in Jacksonville, Florida with his wife; Starr Carswell, and their children.
