= Orlando Ruff =

American football player (born 1976)

No. 94
- Position: Linebacker

Personal information
- Born: September 28, 1976 (age 50); Charleston, South Carolina, U.S.
- Listed height: 6 ft 2 in (1.88 m)
- Listed weight: 250 lb (113 kg)

Career information
- High school: Fairfield Central
- College: Furman
- NFL draft: 1999: undrafted

Career history
- San Diego Chargers (1999–2002); New Orleans Saints (2003–2004); Cleveland Browns (2005)
- Stats at Pro Football Reference

Orlando Bernardo Ruff (born September 28, 1976, in Charleston, South Carolina) is an American former professional football player who was a linebacker in the National Football League (NFL) for the San Diego Chargers, New Orleans Saints and Cleveland Browns. He played college football for the Furman Paladins, departing as the fourth ranking player in school history with 488 career tackles.

He was signed in 1999 as an undrafted free agent by the San Diego Chargers. While there, he was named Special Teams Player of the Year in 1999 and 2002), and was stout against the run as a starter during the 2000 and 2001 seasons. He departed in 2003 via free agency.

Ruff subsequently signed in the spring of 2003 with the New Orleans Saints. He remained there for two seasons as middle linebacker. During his tenure in New Orleans, he finished second in overall tackles for two consecutive years.

He concluded his career in 2005 with the Cleveland Browns.

In his NFL career, Orlando played in 108 games. During that stint he finished with a total of 344 tackles, one sack and three interceptions.
