= Nate Turner (wide receiver) =

American football player (born 1978)

No. 6
- Position: Wide receiver

Personal information
- Born: May 26, 1978 (age 48); Compton, California, U.S.
- Listed height: 6 ft 3 in (1.91 m)
- Listed weight: 210 lb (95 kg)

Career information
- High school: David Starr Jordan (Los Angeles)
- College: UNLV
- NFL draft: 2001: undrafted

Career history
- San Diego Chargers (2001); New Orleans Saints (2003)*; → Frankfurt Galaxy (2003)
- * Offseason or practice squad member only
- Stats at Pro Football Reference

Nathaniel J. Turner (born May 26, 1978) is an American former professional football wide receiver who played for the San Diego Chargers of the National Football League (NFL). He played college football for the UNLV Rebels.

== Early life ==
Nathaniel J. Turner was born on May 26, 1978, in Compton, California. He attended David Starr Jordan High School in Los Angeles.

== College career ==
Turner played junior college football at Mt. San Antonio College in 1997 and Compton College in 1998. He transferred to the University of Nevada, Las Vegas, where he was a two-year letterman for the Rebels from 1999 to 2000. He caught 45 passes for 627 yards and six touchdowns in 1999. As a senior in 2000, Turner recorded 66 receptions for 947 yards and 10 touchdowns. Despite leading the Mountain West Conference (MWC) in all three receiving categorists, he only earned honorable mention All-MWC honors.

== Professional career ==
After going undrafted in the 2001 NFL draft, Turner signed with the San Diego Chargers on May 1, 2001. He was released on September 2, signed to the practice squad on September 4, released on December 14, and signed to the practice squad again on December 19. Turner was promoted to the active roster on December 22 and played in one game for the Chargers during the 2001 season, catching zero passes on one target. He was released again on August 25, 2002.

On January 10, 2003, Turner was signed by the New Orleans Saints. He was allocated to NFL Europe to play for the Frankfurt Galaxy. However, he was placed on injured reserve on March 23, 2003, before the start of the 2003 NFL Europe season and never played for the Galaxy. Turner was released by the Saints with an injury settlement.

== Personal life ==
Turner's wife, Felicia Madrigal, played soccer at UNLV. His first daughter, Blake, played soccer at Columbia. His second daughter, Reilyn, is a professional soccer player.

Turner was the assistant head coach and offensive coordinator at Long Beach Polytechnic High School from 2015 to 2016, the head football coach at William Howard Taft Charter High School from 2016 to 2017, the head football coach at Los Angeles Southwest College from 2017 to 2019, the associate head football coach and offensive coordinator at Moorpark College in 2019, and the associate head coach and offensive coordinator at Los Angeles Valley College in 2020. In 2023, he was named the head football coach at San Marino High School.
