= Rod Smith (wide receiver) =

American football player (born 1970)

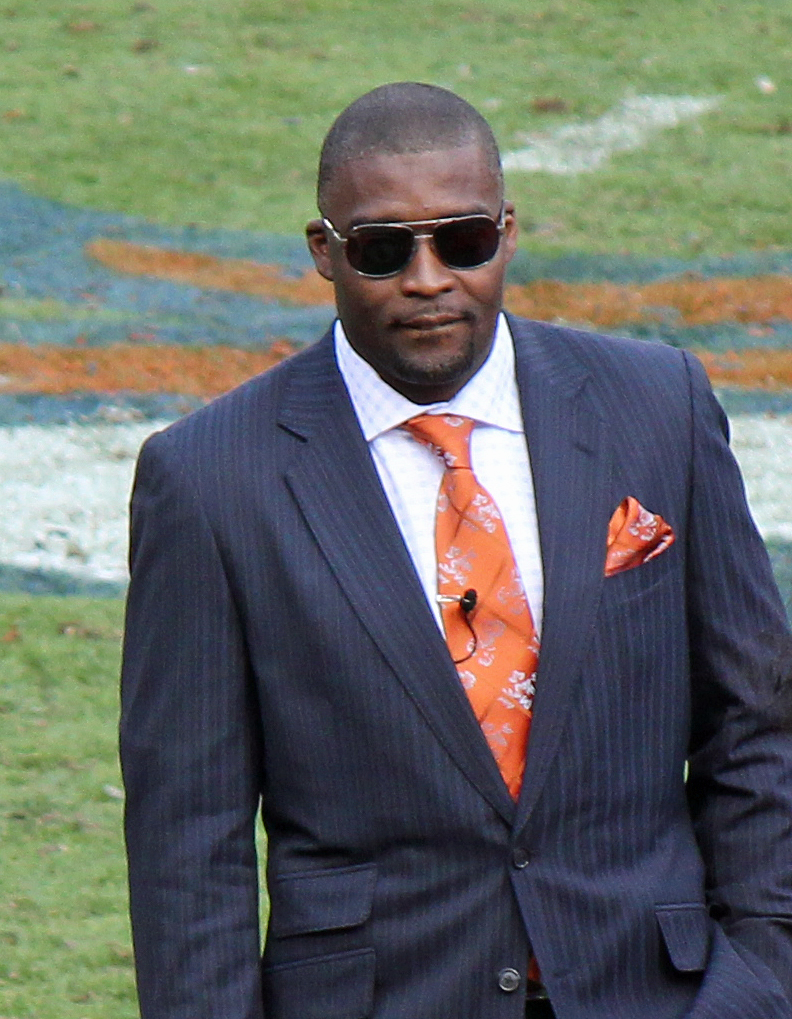
- Smith in 2012

No. 80
- Position: Wide receiver

Personal information
- Born: May 15, 1970 (age 56); Texarkana, Arkansas, U.S.
- Listed height: 6 ft 0 in (1.83 m)
- Listed weight: 200 lb (91 kg)

Career information
- High school: Arkansas (Texarkana)
- College: Missouri Southern (1988–1993)
- NFL draft: 1994: undrafted

Career history
- Denver Broncos (1994–2006)

Awards and highlights
- 2× Super Bowl champion (XXXII, XXXIII); 2× Second-team All-Pro (2000, 2001); 3× Pro Bowl (2000, 2001, 2005); NFL receptions leader (2001); Denver Broncos Ring of Fame; Denver Broncos 50th Anniversary Team; First-team DII All-American (1993); 2× First-team All-MIAA (1992, 1993); Missouri Southern Lions No. 9 retired

Career NFL statistics
- Receptions: 849
- Receiving yards: 11,389
- Receiving touchdowns: 68
- Stats at Pro Football Reference
- College Football Hall of Fame

Roderick Duane Smith (born May 15, 1970) is an American former professional football player who was a wide receiver in the National Football League (NFL) for 12 seasons, all with the Denver Broncos. He played college football for the Missouri Southern Lions and was signed by the Broncos as an undrafted free agent and played his entire career with the team. Following his final game in the NFL at the conclusion of the 2006 season, Smith's 849 career receptions and 11,389 receiving yards ranked him 11th and 17th all-time respectively. As of 2025's offseason, Smith ranks 35th and 40th all-time in receptions and receiving yards respectively. He is widely considered one of the greatest undrafted players in NFL history.

== Early life ==
At Arkansas Senior High School in Texarkana, Arkansas, Smith lettered two years in football and basketball, and one year in baseball. As a senior in football, he was All-League, All-Area, and All-State.

== College career ==
Smith enjoyed a stellar career at Missouri Southern State University, finishing with conference records in career receiving yards (3,043) and touchdowns (34). He also broke the school's reception record (153), and was named first-team All-America by AP, Kodak, Football Gazette and NCAA Division II sports information directors after his senior year. In his final season, Smith caught 63 passes for 986 yards and 13 touchdowns, and was a finalist for the Harlon Hill Trophy, given annually to the top football player at the Division II level. He was named Missouri Southern's Outstanding Graduate in 1994 after completing his collegiate studies with three degrees, in economics and finance, general business, as well as marketing and management.

== Professional career ==
After the 1994 draft, Smith went undrafted and was signed by the Denver Broncos as a free agent. He spent all of 1994 on the practice squad, and would not see game action until the following year, when he made the final roster. His first NFL catch was a last-minute 43-yard touchdown from John Elway in a 38–31 win against the Washington Redskins on September 17, 1995. Throughout his career, Smith had eight seasons of at least 1,000 receiving yards. He had two seasons of at least 100 receptions (2000: 100; 2001: 113). In 2000, Smith and teammate Ed McCaffrey became only the second wide receiver duo on the same team to each gain 100 receptions in the same season (with Herman Moore and Brett Perriman). His 113 receptions in 2001 led the league. He was a starting wide receiver of the Broncos' back-to-back Super Bowl championships in 1997 and 1998. In the Broncos' 34–19 win in Super Bowl XXXIII, Smith had five receptions for 152 yards, tied for 5th most in Super Bowl history, including an 80-yard touchdown reception. He was a finalist for the Walter Payton Man of the Year Award in 2004.

A hip injury that he suffered in 2006 required a complete hip replacement. On December 28, 2007, it was revealed that Smith needed another hip surgery, possibly ending his career. He was placed on the reserve/retired list on February 15, 2008, and announced his formal retirement from professional football on July 24, 2008, in a press conference at the team's Dove Valley headquarters.

Smith finished his career as the Broncos all-time leader in receptions (849), receiving yards (11,389), and touchdown receptions (68). Also an accomplished punt returner, Smith returned 53 punts for 647 yards and a touchdown. His 12.2 yards per return average ranked him 2nd all time among Broncos players with at least 50 punt returns. With two Super Bowls, three Pro Bowls, and a controversy-free career noted for professionalism, Smith left the Broncos as one of the most well-loved players of all time. In May 2012 it was announced that he would be inducted into the Broncos Ring of Fame in his first year of eligibility for the honor. The induction ceremony took place on Sunday, Sep 23, at halftime of the Broncos' home game against the Houston Texans at Sports Authority Field at Mile High.

=== Awards and accomplishments ===
- First undrafted player to reach 10,000 receiving yards, and the 24th in history to eclipse that figure.
- Retired with the most receptions (849) receiving yards (11,389) and touchdown receptions (68) of any undrafted player in NFL history. Surpassed in all three categories by Antonio Gates.
- Currently ranks second in receiving yards and receiving touchdowns by an undrafted player, and third in receptions.
- Holds Broncos franchise records in career receptions, receiving yards and touchdown catches.
- Ranks first on Denver's all-time yards from scrimmage list.
- Only the sixth player in NFL history to have 100 receptions against at least 3 teams (Kansas City Chiefs, San Diego Chargers and Oakland Raiders).
- AFC Offensive Player of the Week (week 15; 12/17/05 against the Buffalo Bills at Buffalo).
- Associated Press second-team All-Pro (2000, 2001).
- Football Digest first-team All-Pro (2000, 2001).
- USA Today first-team All-Pro (2000).
- College and Pro Newsweekly first-team All-Pro (2000).
- Pro Football Weekly All-AFC (2000, 2001).
- Division II Hall of Fame (Inducted in 2008)
- College Football Hall of Fame (Inducted in 2009)
- Denver Broncos Ring of Fame (Inducted in 2012)

==== Franchise records ====
As of 2023's NFL off-season, Rod Smith held at least 11 Broncos franchise records, including:

- Receptions: career (849), season (113 in 2001)
- Receiving Yds: career (11,389), playoffs (860)
- Receiving TDs: career (68), playoffs (6)
- Total TDs: career (71)
- Yds from Scrimmage: career (11,737)
- All Purpose Yds: career (12,488)
- Games with 1+ TD scored: career (66)
- Seasons with 1000+ receiving yards: career (8)

== NFL career statistics ==
Legend
	Super Bowl champion
	Led the league
**Bold**	Career high

=== Regular season ===
Year	Team	Games		Receiving					
Year	Team	GP	GS	Tgt	Rec	Yds	Avg	Lng	TD
1995	DEN	**16**	1	9	6	152	**25.3**	43	1
1996	DEN	10	1	28	16	237	14.8	49	2
1997	DEN	**16**	**16**	131	70	1,180	16.9	78	**12**
1998	DEN	**16**	**16**	139	86	1,222	14.2	58	6
1999	DEN	15	15	139	79	1,020	12.9	71	4
2000	DEN	**16**	**16**	**173**	100	**1,602**	16.0	49	8
2001	DEN	15	14	172	**113**	1,343	11.9	65	11
2002	DEN	**16**	**16**	147	89	1,027	11.5	46	5
2003	DEN	15	15	114	74	845	11.4	38	3
2004	DEN	**16**	**16**	136	79	1,144	14.5	**85**	7
2005	DEN	**16**	**16**	126	85	1,105	13.0	72	6
2006	DEN	**16**	**16**	94	52	512	9.8	20	3
Career		183	158	1,408	849	11,389	13.4	85	68

=== Postseason ===
Year	Team	Games		Receiving					
Year	Team	GP	GS	Tgt	Rec	Yds	Avg	Lng	TD
1996	DEN	1	0	2	1	15	15	15	0
1997	DEN	**4**	**4**	22	11	205	18.6	43	1
1998	DEN	3	3	**23**	**12**	**260**	**21.7**	**80**	**2**
2000	DEN	1	1	8	3	58	19.3	24	0
2003	DEN	1	1	7	5	66	13.2	34	1
2004	DEN	1	1	10	7	99	14.1	30	1
2005	DEN	2	2	15	10	157	15.7	42	1
Career		13	12	87	49	860	17.6	80	6
