= Raylee Johnson =

American football player (born 1970)

No. 99
- Position: Defensive end

Personal information
- Born: June 1, 1970 (age 56); Chicago, Illinois, U.S.
- Listed height: 6 ft 3 in (1.91 m)
- Listed weight: 272 lb (123 kg)

Career information
- High school: Fordyce (Fordyce, Arkansas)
- College: Arkansas
- NFL draft: 1993: 4th round, 95th overall pick

Career history
- San Diego Chargers (1993–2003); Denver Broncos (2004)

Career NFL statistics
- Tackles: 232
- Sacks: 47
- Forced Fumbles: 11
- Stats at Pro Football Reference

Raylee Johnson (born June 1, 1970) is an American former professional football player who was a defensive end in the National Football League (NFL). He played college football for the Arkansas Razorbacks and was selected by the San Diego Chargers in the 1993 NFL draft Johnson played 10 of his 11 years for the Chargers. He was signed by the Denver Broncos before the 2004 season, and then released on August 29, 2005.
