= Wade Richey =

American football player (born 1976)

No. 7, 5, 9
- Position: Placekicker

Personal information
- Born: May 19, 1976 (age 50); Lafayette, Louisiana, U.S.
- Listed height: 6 ft 4 in (1.93 m)
- Listed weight: 200 lb (91 kg)

Career information
- High school: Carencro (Lafayette)
- College: LSU
- NFL draft: 1998: undrafted

Career history
- Seattle Seahawks (1998)*; San Francisco 49ers (1998–2000); San Diego Chargers (2001–2002); Baltimore Ravens (2003–2004)
- * Offseason or practice squad member only

Career NFL statistics
- Field goals made: 76
- Field goal attempts: 106
- Field goal %: 71.7
- Longest field goal: 56
- Stats at Pro Football Reference

Wade Edward Richey (born May 19, 1976) is an American former professional football player who was a placekicker in the National Football League (NFL). He played college football for the LSU Tigers.

== Early life ==
Richey began his football career at Carencro High School in Carencro, Louisiana.

While at Carencro, he converted 24-of-34 field goals, including a 52-yard field goal in 1992 and a 53-yard field goal in 1993. Richey also converted a career total of 46-of-49 extra points, while 90 percent of his kickoffs resulted in touchbacks. 37 of those kickoffs split the uprights.

At the end of his senior year, Richey was ranked as the number-one kicker in the nation and was named to the USA Today All-American football team. He was also named to the Parade All-American team in 1993. In addition, he participated in the High School All-American Bowl in Allentown, PA and the LHSCA All-Star Game in Baton Rouge, LA.

Richey also was named All-District, All-Acadiana, and Class 5A All-State. SuperPrep Magazine Named Richey the nation’s top kicker and he was featured on ESPN’s Scholastic Sports in America in August 1993.

== At LSU ==
Over 40 universities offered Richey a full athletic scholarship, making him one of the most coveted kicking specialists in high school football history. Richey eventually stayed in-state, choosing LSU over Stanford and Notre Dame.

Richey struggled at LSU, converting just 8-of-23 field goals. He was primarily a kickoff specialist at LSU during his freshman and sophomore years but seized the starting role in 1996 as a junior.

During the 1996 season he set a LSU school record with a 54-yard field goal against Kentucky.

In the 1997 season, he was responsible for most of the placekicking duties, splitting time with back-up placekicker Danny Boyd.

== Professional career ==
After his collegiate career, Richey went undrafted but signed with the Seattle Seahawks for the 1998 preseason. Richey's impressive preseason performance with the Seahawks prompted the San Francisco 49ers to claim him off waivers, making him the starter for their season opener. Richey’s strong leg on kickoffs - which consistently produced deep kicks and touchbacks despite kicking from the 30 yard line - made him valuable to teams even when his field-goal accuracy fluctuated, helping him maintain roster spots and extend his NFL career.

San Francisco 49ers (1998-2000)

In 1998, Richey appeared in 16 games during his rookie season, converting 18 of 27 field-goal attempts (66.7%). Richey kicked three game-winning field goals in his first year. In Week 7, he kicked a 24-yard game-winning field goal with five seconds remaining to defeat the Indianapolis Colts. In Week 10, Richey also hit 46-yarder with 37 seconds left to give 49ers a 25-23 victory over the Carolina Panthers. Richey (again) beat the Panthers with a 23-yard field goal in overtime in Week 14.

Richey delivered the strongest season of his career in 1999. He made 21 of 23 field goals, finishing with a 91.3% accuracy rate, which led the NFL. His dramatic improvement over the previous year established him as one of the league’s most reliable kickers.

Richey continued with the 49ers in 2000, converting 15 of 22 field-goal attempts (68.2%).

San Diego Chargers (2001-2002)

Richey joined the San Diego Chargers in April 2001 as a restricted free agent from San Francisco after the Chargers revoked their offer to popular longtime kicker John Carney. He made 21 of 32 field goals, finishing with a 65.6% conversion rate and led the NFL in touchback percentage (22%). In Week 12, the Chargers used veteran Steve Christie in place of Richey after he missed two field goals in Week 11 in 17-20 loss to the Arizona Cardinals.

In 2002, Richey served as the Chargers kickoff specialist while Christie handled field goals. Richey again lead the NFL in touchback percentage (32%). The Chargers cut Richey after he sent a kickoff out of bounds in a 30-27 overtime win over the Denver Broncos.

Baltimore Ravens (2003-2004)

In 2003, he played for the Baltimore Ravens as a kickoff specialist and converted a career long 56-yard field goal against the Cleveland Browns on September 14, 2003. Richey concluded his career in 2004 handling only kickoffs (7 touchbacks on 53 attempts).

== Life After Football ==
Richey retired after the 2004 season.

He currently resides in Carencro, Louisiana.
