= 2007 San Diego Chargers season =

NFL team 48th season

- Owner: Alex Spanos
- General manager: A. J. Smith
- Head coach: Norv Turner
- Offensive coordinator: Clarence Shelmon
- Defensive coordinator: Ted Cottrell
- Home stadium: Qualcomm Stadium

Results
- Record: 11–5
- Division place: 1st AFC West
- Playoffs: Won Wild Card Playoffs (vs. Titans) 17–6; Won Divisional Playoffs (at Colts) 28–24; Lost AFC Championship (at Patriots) 12–21
- All-Pros: 4: CB Antonio Cromartie (1st team); LB Shawne Merriman (2nd team); FB Lorenzo Neal (1st team); RB LaDainian Tomlinson (1st team)
- Pro Bowlers: 9: CB Antonio Cromartie; G Kris Dielman; TE Antonio Gates; T Marcus McNeill; LB Shawne Merriman; FB Lorenzo Neal; ST Kassim Osgood; RB LaDainian Tomlinson; NT Jamal Williams

The 2007 season was the San Diego Chargers' 38th in the National Football League (NFL) and their 48th overall. After four games, the team failed to equal their 14–2 2006 regular season record, as they immediately stumbled to a bad 1–3 start under new head coach Norv Turner. However, they finished the regular season strongly by winning 10 of 12 games (including their final six games) to take the AFC West title. The Chargers went further in the playoffs than the previous year, but fell again to the New England Patriots, this time in the AFC Championship game. For the second consecutive season, star running back LaDainian Tomlinson led the NFL in rushing with 1,474 yards. In the offseason, the Chargers introduced a new logo, with the lightning bolt changing to yellow with bright blue and regular blue outlines. It would be their logo for 10 years. As of 2024, this season remains the most recent appearance for the Chargers in the AFC championship game.

== Offseason ==
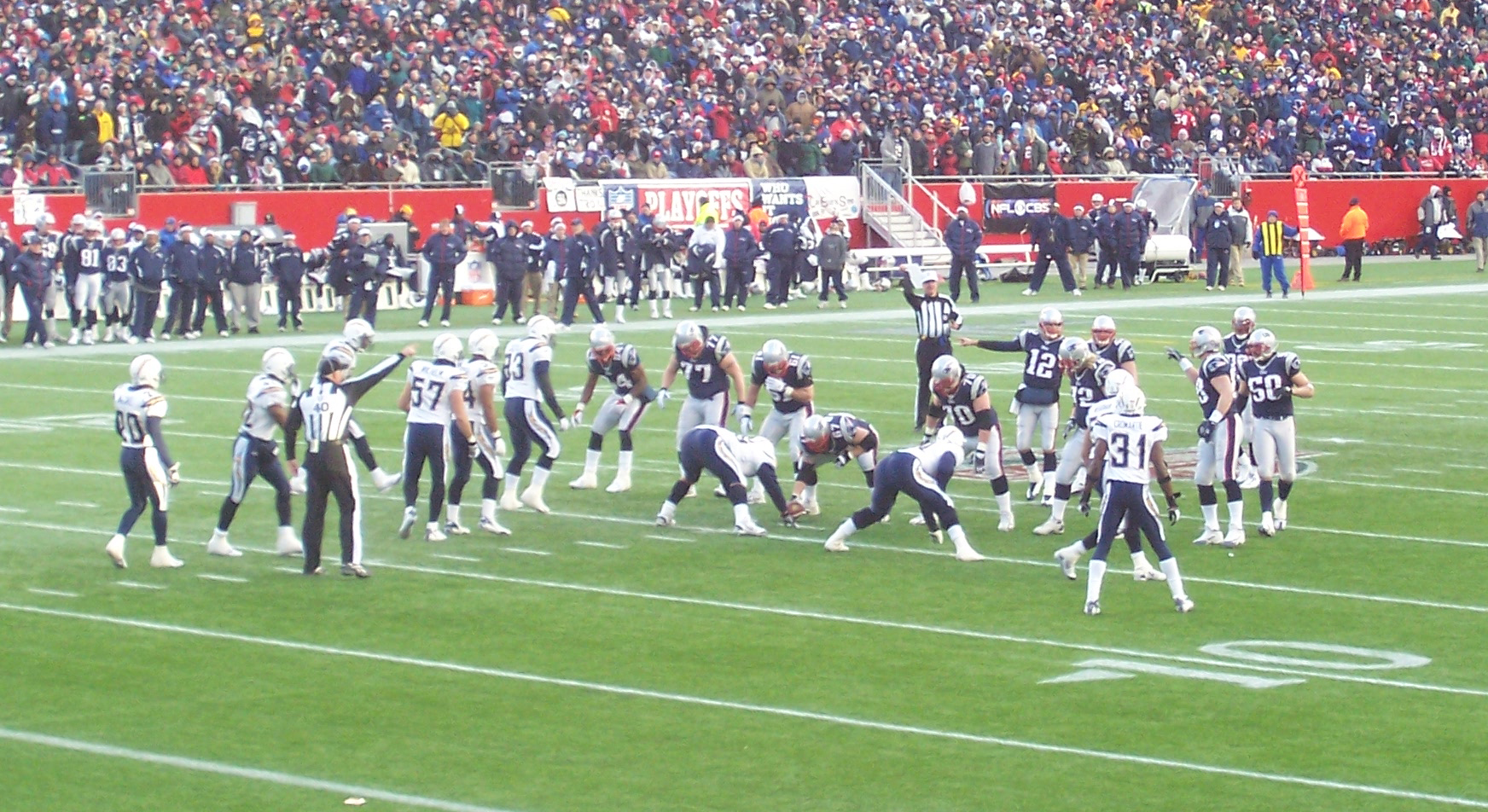
New England takes on San Diego in the AFC Championship Game on January 20, 2008

After a postseason loss to the New England Patriots, offensive and defensive coordinators Cam Cameron and Wade Phillips left for new coaching jobs with the Miami Dolphins and Dallas Cowboys respectively. Marty Schottenheimer, after originally being told he would stay as head coach, was fired in February. Replacing Schottenheimer was Norv Turner, who was signed to take over the helm later in the month. Turner, who installed the Chargers offensive set when he was their offensive coordinator in 2001, was selected to be the head coach largely because he was expected to maintain the offensive game plan that led the team to its best regular season record in team history. Turner also agreed with general manager A. J. Smith on the hiring of defensive coordinator Ted Cottrell, who had worked with Phillips when both were with the Buffalo Bills and later was the defensive coordinator with the Bills. Chicago Bears defensive coordinator Ron Rivera, who interviewed for the Chargers' head coaching job, was hired to coach the Chargers' linebackers instead. Smith also re-signed Charger free agent offensive guard Kris Dielman to a six-year contract that will virtually guarantee him almost $17 million and put him around $40 million over the life of the deal. Linebacker Donnie Edwards was not offered a contract and signed with his former team, the Kansas City Chiefs. The Chargers released veteran wide receiver Keenan McCardell during the offseason along with safety Terrence Kiel.

=== Draft ===
The Chargers started out by making the 30th overall pick in the 2007 NFL draft due to their 14–2 season in 2006. They selected Craig Davis out of Louisiana State University. In the second round, the Chargers made a trade with the Bears in order to move up and select safety Eric Weddle at slot 37#. He was selected as a possible replacement to Terrence Kiel, who was released earlier in the off-season following his arrest on drug charges during the 2006 season. The Chargers exchanged their second round selection in 2007 as well as third round, fifth round and 2008 third round selection. The Chargers also selected linebacker Anthony Waters from Clemson University, who missed his senior season due to a leg injury.

2007 San Diego Chargers draft
Round	Pick	Player	Position	College	Notes
1	30	Craig Davis	WR	LSU	
2	37	Eric Weddle *	S	Utah	
3	96	Anthony Waters	LB	Clemson	
4	129	Scott Chandler	TE	Iowa	
5	172	Legedu Naanee	WR	Boise State	
7	240	Brandon Siler	LB	Florida	
Made roster † Pro Football Hall of Fame * Made at least one Pro Bowl during career

=== Supplemental draft ===
2007 San Diego Chargers draft
Round	Pick	Player	Position	College	Notes
4	1	Paul Oliver	S	Georgia	
Made roster † Pro Football Hall of Fame * Made at least one Pro Bowl during career

== Staff ==
San Diego Chargers 2007 staff
Front office: Owner – Alex Spanos; President/CEO – Dean Spanos; Executive vice president – Michael Spanos; Executive vice president/executive officer – A. G. Spanos; Executive vice president/general manager – A. J. Smith; Assistant General manager - Director of player personnel - Buddy Nix; Vice president of football operations – Ed McGuire; Director of pro scouting – Dennis Abraham; Director of college scouting – Jimmy Raye; Assistant director of college scouting – John Spanos; Head coaches: Head coach – Norv Turner; Assistant to the Head Coach – Margie Smith; Offensive coaches: Offensive coordinator – Clarence Shelmon; Quarterbacks – John Ramsdell; Running backs – Matt Simon; Wide receivers – James Lofton; Tight ends - Clancy Barone; Offensive line – Hal Hunter; Offensive line – Jack Henry	Defensive coaches: Defensive coordinator – Ted Cottrell; Defensive line – Wayne Nunnely; Inside linebackers - Ron Rivera; Outside linebackers – John Pagano; Secondary – Bill Bradley; Assistant secondary/Defensive quality control – Kevin Ross; Special teams coaches: Special teams – Steve Crosby; Strength and conditioning: Strength and conditioning – Jeff Hurd; Assistant strength and conditioning – Vernon Stephens

== Roster ==
2007 San Diego Chargers roster
Quarterbacks (QB): 17 Philip Rivers; 7 Billy Volek; 6 Charlie Whitehurst; Running backs (RB): 41 Lorenzo Neal FB; 34 Andrew Pinnock FB; 43 Darren Sproles KR/PR; 21 LaDainian Tomlinson; 33 Michael Turner KR; Wide receivers (WR): 89 Chris Chambers; 84 Craig Davis; 80 Malcom Floyd; 83 Vincent Jackson; 40 Legedu Naanee; 81 Kassim Osgood; Tight ends (TE): 87 Scott Chandler; 85 Antonio Gates; 86 Brandon Manumaleuna	Offensive linemen (OL): 66 Jeromey Clary T; 68 Kris Dielman G; 79 Mike Goff G; 61 Nick Hardwick C; 73 Marcus McNeill T; 63 Scott Mruczkowski C/G; 70 Shane Olivea T; 65 Cory Withrow C; Defensive linemen (DL): 97 Ryon Bingham DE/NT; 93 Luis Castillo DE; 74 Jacques Cesaire DE; 91 Brandon McKinney NT; 99 Igor Olshansky DE; 76 Jamal Williams NT	Linebackers (LB): 54 Stephen Cooper ILB; 51 Tim Dobbins ILB; 92 Marques Harris OLB; 56 Shawne Merriman OLB; 95 Shaun Phillips OLB; 59 Brandon Siler ILB; 94 Jyles Tucker OLB; 53 Anthony Waters ILB; 57 Matt Wilhelm ILB; Defensive backs (DB): 31 Antonio Cromartie CB; 29 Drayton Florence CB; 24 Cletis Gordon CB; 28 Steve Gregory CB/S; 42 Clinton Hart SS; 23 Quentin Jammer CB; 20 Marlon McCree FS; 25 Paul Oliver CB/S; 32 Eric Weddle FS; Special teams (ST): 50 David Binn LS; 10 Nate Kaeding K; 16 Dave Rayner K; 5 Mike Scifres P	Practice squad: 49 Antwan Applewhite LB; 36 Tra Battle S; 30 Eldra Buckley RB; 78 Andre Coleman DE; 96 Keith Grennan DE; 90 Keith Jackson DT; 45 Terna Nande LB; 77 Tony Pape G/T; Reserve: 22 Tyronne Gross RB (IR); 88 Eric Parker WR (IR); 52 Carlos Polk LB (IR); -- Germaine Race RB (IR); Rookies in italics 53 active, 4 reserve, 8 practice squad

== Preseason ==
=== Schedule ===
Week	Date	Opponent	Result	Record	Venue	Recap
1	August 12	Seattle Seahawks	L 16–24	0–1	Qualcomm Stadium	Recap
2	August 18	St. Louis Rams	W 30–13	1–1	Edward Jones Dome	Recap
3	August 25	Arizona Cardinals	W 33–31	2–1	University of Phoenix Stadium	Recap
4	August 30	San Francisco 49ers	W 16–13	3–1	Qualcomm Stadium	Recap

== Regular season ==
=== Schedule ===
Week	Date	Opponent	Result	Record	Venue	Recap
1	September 9	Chicago Bears	W 14–3	1–0	Qualcomm Stadium	Recap
2	September 16	at New England Patriots	L 14–38	1–1	Gillette Stadium	Recap
3	September 23	at Green Bay Packers	L 24–31	1–2	Lambeau Field	Recap
4	September 30	Kansas City Chiefs	L 16–30	1–3	Qualcomm Stadium	Recap
5	October 7	at Denver Broncos	W 41–3	2–3	Invesco Field at Mile High	Recap
6	October 14	Oakland Raiders	W 28–14	3–3	Qualcomm Stadium	Recap
7	Bye					
8	October 28	Houston Texans	W 35–10	4–3	Qualcomm Stadium	Recap
9	November 4	at Minnesota Vikings	L 17–35	4–4	Hubert H. Humphrey Metrodome	Recap
10	November 11	Indianapolis Colts	W 23–21	5–4	Qualcomm Stadium	Recap
11	November 18	at Jacksonville Jaguars	L 17–24	5–5	Jacksonville Municipal Stadium	Recap
12	November 25	Baltimore Ravens	W 32–14	6–5	Qualcomm Stadium	Recap
13	December 2	at Kansas City Chiefs	W 24–10	7–5	Arrowhead Stadium	Recap
14	December 9	at Tennessee Titans	W 23–17 (OT)	8–5	LP Field	Recap
15	December 16	Detroit Lions	W 51–14	9–5	Qualcomm Stadium	Recap
16	December 24	Denver Broncos	W 23–3	10–5	Qualcomm Stadium	Recap
17	December 30	at Oakland Raiders	W 30–17	11–5	McAfee Coliseum	Recap

=== Game summaries ===
==== Week 1: vs. Chicago Bears ====
Week 1: Chicago Bears at San Diego Chargers

Quarter	1	2	3	4	Total
Bears	0	3	0	0	3
Chargers	0	0	7	7	14

at Qualcomm Stadium, San Diego, California

- Date: September 9
- Game time: 1:15 p.m. PDT
- Game weather: 73 °F (23 °C) (Clear and Sunny)
- Game attendance: 67,837
- Referee: Pete Morelli
- TV announcers (FOX): Joe Buck (play-by-play) and Troy Aikman (color commentator)
- Box score

Game information

First quarter

- No scoring plays.

Second quarter

- CHI – Robbie Gould 27-yard field goal, 14:13. Bears 3–0. Drive: 8 plays, 27 yards, 3:54.

Third quarter

- SDG – Antonio Gates 17-yard pass from LaDainian Tomlinson (Nate Kaeding kick), 0:45. Chargers 7–3. Drive: 4 plays, 29 yards, 2:05.

Fourth quarter

- SDG – LaDainian Tomlinson 7-yard run (Nate Kaeding kick), 9:09. Chargers 14–3. Drive: 8 plays, 56 yards, 4:36.

Top passers

- CHI – Rex Grossman – 12/23, 145 yards, INT
- SDG – Philip Rivers – 22/31, 190 yards, INT

Top rushers

- CHI – Cedric Benson – 19 rushes, 42 yards
- SDG – Michael Turner – 10 rushes, 41 yards

Top receivers

- CHI – Bernard Berrian – 5 receptions, 83 yards
- SDG – Antonio Gates – 9 receptions, 107 yards, TD

The Chargers began their 2007 campaign at home as they matched up their offensive firepower against the Chicago Bears and their stingy defense. In this defensive slugfest, the Bears held RB LaDainian Tomlinson, the previous year's league MVP, to just 25 yards rushing on 17 attempts, while getting a 27-yard field goal from kicker Robbie Gould in the second quarter. This game also marked the first time since 2001 that the Chargers were shut out in the first half. In the third quarter, San Diego started to bounce back as Tomlinson threw his 7th career touchdown pass to TE Antonio Gates from 17 yards out. In the fourth, Tomlinson delivered the final blow with a 7-yard TD run.

With the win, the Chargers began their season at 1–0.

==== Week 2: at New England Patriots ====
Week 2: San Diego Chargers at New England Patriots

Quarter	1	2	3	4	Total
Chargers	0	0	7	7	14
Patriots	14	10	7	7	38

at Gillette Stadium, Foxborough, Massachusetts

- Date: September 16
- Game time: 8:24 p.m. EDT
- Game weather: 55 °F (13 °C) (Clear & Cool)
- Game attendance: 68,756
- Referee: Ed Hochuli
- TV announcers (NBC): Al Michaels (play-by-play) and John Madden (color commentator)
- Box score

Game information

First quarter

- NE – Benjamin Watson 7-yard pass from Tom Brady (Stephen Gostkowski kick), 12:14. Patriots 7–0. Drive: 7 plays, 69 yards, 2:46.
- NE – Randy Moss 23-yard pass from Tom Brady (Stephen Gostkowski kick), 3:55. Patriots 14–0. Drive: 10 plays, 75 yards, 5:58.

Second quarter

- NE – Stephen Gostkowski 24-yard field goal, 10:01. Patriots 17–0. Drive: 10 plays, 50 yards, 5:35.
- NE – Adalius Thomas 65-yard interception return (Stephen Gostkowski kick), 5:17. Patriots 24–0.

Third quarter

- SDG – Lorenzo Neal 1-yard pass from Philip Rivers (Nate Kaeding kick), 6:43. Patriots 24–7. Drive: 16 plays, 72 yards, 8:17.
- NE – Randy Moss 24-yard pass from Tom Brady (Stephen Gostkowski kick), 2:56. Patriots 31–7. Drive: 7 plays, 75 yards, 3:47.

Fourth quarter

- SDG – Antonio Gates 12-yard pass from Philip Rivers ([Nate Kaeding kick), 14:48. Patriots 31–14. Drive: 8 plays, 82 yards, 3:08.
- NE – Sammy Morris 3-yard run (Stephen Gostkowski kick), 3:18. Patriots 38–14. Drive: 15 plays, 91 yards, 10:07.

Top passers

- SDG – Philip Rivers – 19/30, 179 yards, 2 TD, 2 INT
- NE – Tom Brady – 25/31, 279 yards, 3 TD, INT

Top rushers

- SDG – LaDainian Tomlinson – 18 rushes, 43 yards
- NE – Laurence Maroney – 15 rushes, 77 yards

Top receivers

- SDG – Antonio Gates – 7 receptions, 77 yards, TD
- NE – Randy Moss – 8 receptions, 105 yards, 2 TD

Following their low-scoring home win over the Bears, the Chargers flew to Gillette Stadium for a Week 2 Sunday night fight against the New England Patriots in a rematch of last year's AFC Divisional game. In the first quarter, San Diego trailed early as the Patriots took their opening drive and ended it with QB Tom Brady completing a 7-yard TD pass to TE Benjamin Watson. Afterwards, New England continued its opening assault as Brady completed a 23-yard TD pass to WR Randy Moss. In the second quarter, the Chargers continued to show last week's first half struggles as Patriots kicker Stephen Gostkowski getting a 24-yard field goal, while LB Adalius Thomas intercepted one of QB Philip Rivers' passes and returned it 65 yards for a touchdown.

In the third quarter, the Chargers finally managed to score as Rivers completed a 1-yard TD pass to FB Lorenzo Neal, but New England responded with Brady and Moss hooking up with each other again on a 24-yard TD pass. In the fourth quarter, San Diego tried to fight back with Rivers completing a 12-yard TD pass to TE Antonio Gates, but the Patriots ended the game with RB Sammy Morris getting a 3-yard TD run.

RB LaDainian Tomlinson was a non-factor, as he was only able to muster 43 yards on 18 carries. At this point, he was off to a rough start, totalling only 68 rushing yards in the first two games.

With the loss, the Chargers fell to 1–1.

==== Week 3: at Green Bay Packers ====
Week 3: San Diego Chargers at Green Bay Packers

Quarter	1	2	3	4	Total
Chargers	7	7	7	3	24
Packers	3	14	0	14	31

at Lambeau Field, Green Bay, Wisconsin

- Date: September 23
- Game time: 12:02 p.m. CDT
- Game weather: 73 °F (23 °C) (Sunny)
- Game attendance: 70,733
- Referee: Jeff Triplette
- TV announcers (CBS): Jim Nantz (play-by-play) and Phil Simms (color commentator)
- Box score

Game information

First quarter

- SDG – Vincent Jackson 27-yard pass from Philip Rivers (Nate Kaeding kick), 7:07. Chargers 7–3. Drive: 9 plays, 60 yards, 5:43.
- GB – Mason Crosby 28-yard field goal, 2:40. Chargers 7–3. Drive: 9 plays, 77 yards, 4:27.

Second quarter

- GB – Donald Driver 5-yard pass from Brett Favre (Mason Crosby kick), 11:53. Packers 10–7. Drive: 7 plays, 49 yards, 3:39.
- GB – Bubba Franks 5-yard pass from Brett Favre (Mason Crosby kick), 2:48. Packers 17–7. Drive: 10 plays, 75 yards, 5:58.
- SDG – Craig Davis 9-yard pass from Philip Rivers (Nate Kaeding kick), 0:32. Packers 17–14. Drive: 9 plays, 80 yards, 2:16.

Third quarter

- SDG – LaDainian Tomlinson 21-yard pass from Philip Rivers (Nate Kaeding kick), 9:02. Chargers 21–17. Drive: 12 plays, 80 yards, 5:58.

Fourth quarter

- GB – Greg Jennings 57-yard pass from Brett Favre (Mason Crosby kick), 2:03. Packers 24–21. Drive: 2 plays, 57 yards, 0:15.
- GB – Brandon Jackson 1-yard run (Mason Crosby kick), 0:59. Packers 31–21. Drive: 2 plays, 2 yards, 0:13.
- SDG – Nate Kaeding 44-yard field goal, 0:20. Packers 31–24. Drive: 5 plays, 43 yards, 0:39.

Top passers

- SDG – Philip Rivers – 27/36, 306 yards, 3 TD, INT
- GB – Brett Favre – 28/45, 369 yards, 3 TD

Top rushers

- SDG – LaDainian Tomlinson – 22 rushes, 62 yards
- GB – Brandon Jackson – 6 rushes, 22 yards, TD

Top receivers

- SDG – Antonio Gates – 11 receptions, 113 yards
- GB – Donald Driver – 6 receptions, 126 yards, TD

Trying to rebound from their primetime road loss to the Patriots, the Chargers flew to Lambeau Field for Week 3, as they played an interconference game with the Green Bay Packers. In the first quarter, San Diego struck first with QB Philip Rivers completing a 27-yard TD pass to WR Vincent Jackson. The Packers responded with kicker Mason Crosby getting a 28-yard field goal. In the second quarter, Green Bay took the lead with QB Brett Favre completing a pair of 5-yard TD passes, one to WR Donald Driver and one to TE Bubba Franks. The Chargers responded with Rivers completing a 9-yard TD pass to WR Craig Davis.

In the third quarter, the Chargers took the lead with Rivers completing a 21-yard TD pass to RB LaDainian Tomlinson for the only score of the period. However, in the fourth quarter, the Packers retook the lead with Favre's record-tying 57-yard TD pass to WR Greg Jennings, along with RB Brandon Jackson getting a 1-yard TD run. San Diego tried to come back, as kicker Nate Kaeding got a 44-yard field goal. However, the onside kick failed with Green Bay holding on to win.

Notable: Philip Rivers broke a Chargers record completing 15 consecutive passes in the first half. With the loss, the Chargers fell to 1–2.

==== Week 4: vs. Kansas City Chiefs ====
Week 4: Kansas City Chiefs at San Diego Chargers

Quarter	1	2	3	4	Total
Chiefs	0	6	10	14	30
Chargers	10	6	0	0	16

at Qualcomm Stadium, San Diego, California

- Date: September 30
- Game time: 1:15 p.m. PDT
- Game weather: 76 °F (24 °C) (Clear & Sunny)
- Game attendance: 65,175
- Referee: Larry Nemmers
- TV announcers (CBS): Dick Enberg (play-by-play) and Randy Cross (color commentator)
- Box score

Game information

First quarter

- SDG – Nate Kaeding 24-yard field goal, 8:19. Chargers 3–0. Drive: 12 plays, 66 yards, 6:41.
- SDG – LaDainian Tomlinson 5-yard run (Nate Kaeding kick), 3:56. Chargers 10–0. Drive: 5 plays, 55 yards, 3:02.

Second quarter

- KAN – Dave Rayner 21-yard field goal, 11:10. Chargers 10–3. Drive: 7 plays, 19 yards, 3:41.
- SDG – Nate Kaeding 51-yard field goal, 6:55. Chargers 13–3. Drive: 4 plays, 3 yards, 2:20.
- KAN – Dave Rayner 25-yard field goal, 1:20. Chargers 13–6. Drive: 7 plays, 41 yards, 2:55.
- SDG – Nate Kaeding 38-yard field goal, 0:00. Chargers 16–6. Drive: 8 plays, 58 yards, 1:20.

Third quarter

- KAN – Dave Rayner 41-yard field goal, 5:28. Chargers 16–9. Drive: 9 plays, 57 yards, 3:50.
- KAN – Tony Gonzalez 22-yard pass from Damon Huard (Dave Rayner kick), 1:50. Tied 16–16. Drive: 3 plays, 36 yards, 0:39.

Fourth quarter

- KAN – Dwayne Bowe 51-yard pass from Damon Huard (Dave Rayner kick), 11:46. Chiefs 23–16. Drive: 8 plays, 77 yards, 3:24.
- KAN – Tyron Brackenridge 50-yard fumble return (Dave Rayner kick), 7:24. Chiefs 30–16.

Top passers

- KAN – Damon Huard – 17/29, 284 yards, 2 TD, 2 INT
- SDG – Philip Rivers – 21/42, 211 yards, 2 INT

Top rushers

- KAN – Larry Johnson – 25 rushes, 123 yards
- SDG – LaDainian Tomlinson – 20 rushes, 132 yards, TD

Top receivers

- KAN – Dwayne Bowe – 8 receptions, 164 yards, TD
- SDG – Antonio Gates – 6 receptions, 79 yards

Trying to snap a two-game skid, the Chargers went home for an AFC West duel with the Kansas City Chiefs. In the first quarter, San Diego's struggling offense found some life with kicker Nate Kaeding getting a 24-yard field goal, while RB LaDainian Tomlinson got a 5-yard TD run. In the second quarter, the Chargers increased its lead with Kaeding kicking a 51-yard field goal. The Chiefs answered with a 25-yard field goal by Dave Rayner. Afterwards, San Diego ended the half with Kaeding getting a 38-yard field goal. In the third quarter, the Chargers lost their lead, with Kansas City getting a 41-yard field goal from Rayner and QB Damon Huard completing a 22-yard TD pass to TE Tony Gonzalez. Even worse, San Diego ended up losing in the fourth quarter with Huard completing a 51-yard TD pass to WR Dwayne Bowe, along with CB Tyron Brackenridge returning a fumble 50 yards for a touchdown.

With their third-straight loss, the Chargers fell to 1–3.

One of the few positives from the game, Tomlinson finally got his first 100-yard game of the year, with 132 rushing yards on 20 carries.

==== Week 5: at Denver Broncos ====
Week 5: San Diego Chargers at Denver Broncos

Quarter	1	2	3	4	Total
Chargers	14	6	14	7	41
Broncos	0	3	0	0	3

at Invesco Field at Mile High, Denver, Colorado

- Date: October 7
- Game time: 2:15 p.m. MDT
- Game weather: 54 °F (12 °C) (Partly Sunny)
- Game attendance: 76,879
- Referee: Scott Green
- TV announcers (CBS): Jim Nantz (play-by-play) and Phil Simms (color commentator)
- Box score

Game information

First quarter

- SDG – Philip Rivers 2-yard run (Nate Kaeding kick), 6:26. Chargers 7–0. Drive: 8 plays, 71 yards, 4:14.
- SDG – Brandon Siler 23-yard fumble return (Nate Kaeding kick), 6:15. Chargers 14–0.

Second quarter

- SDG – Nate Kaeding 26-yard field goal, 11:23. Chargers 14–3. Drive: 13 plays, 83 yards, 6:57.
- DEN – Jason Elam 30-yard field goal, 1:15. Chargers 17–3. Drive: 10 plays, 45 yards, 5:13.
- SDG – Nate Kaeding 45-yard field goal, 0:00. Chargers 20–3. Drive: 5 plays, 52 yards, 1:15.

Third quarter

- SDG – Antonio Gates 9-yard pass from Philip Rivers (Nate Kaeding kick), 9:20. Chargers 27–3. Drive: 8 plays, 73 yards, 5:40.
- SDG – Vincent Jackson 15-yard pass from Philip Rivers (Nate Kaeding kick), 0:07. Chargers 34–3. Drive: 10 plays, 79 yards, 6:09.

Fourth quarter

- SDG – Michael Turner 74-yard run (Nate Kaeding kick), 9:42. Chargers 41–3. Drive: 2 plays, 86 yards, 0:44.

Top passers

- SDG – Philip Rivers – 13/18, 270 yards, 2 TD
- DEN – Jay Cutler – 23/36, 232 yards, INT

Top rushers

- SDG – Michael Turner – 10 rushes, 147 yards, TD
- DEN – Travis Henry – 16 rushes, 65 yards

Top receivers

- SDG – Antonio Gates – 7 receptions, 113 yards, TD
- DEN – Brandon Marshall – 7 receptions, 72 yards

Hoping to rebound from their embarrassing divisional home loss to the Chiefs, the Chargers flew to Invesco Field at Mile High for a Week 5 divisional duel with the Denver Broncos. In the first quarter, San Diego got off to a fast start with QB Philip Rivers getting a 2-yard TD run. Immediately afterwards on the ensuing kickoff, rookie LB Brandon Siler returned a fumble 23 yards for a touchdown. In the second quarter, the Chargers increased its lead with kicker Nate Kaeding getting a 26-yard field goal. Afterwards, the Broncos got their only score of the game with kicker Jason Elam getting a 30-yard field goal. San Diego ended the half with Kaeding nailing a 45-yard field goal.

In the third quarter, the Chargers continued their offensive revival with Rivers completing a 9-yard TD pass to TE Antonio Gates and a 15-yard TD pass to WR Vincent Jackson. In the fourth quarter, RB Michael Turner helped San Diego seal their easy victory with a 74-yard TD run.

With the win, the Chargers improved to 2–3. The win also marked San Diego's first back-to-back wins in Denver since 1967 and 1968.

==== Week 6: vs. Oakland Raiders ====
Week 6: Oakland Raiders at San Diego Chargers

Quarter	1	2	3	4	Total
Raiders	0	7	0	7	14
Chargers	14	0	7	7	28

at Qualcomm Stadium, San Diego, California

- Date: October 7
- Game time: 1:15 p.m. PDT
- Game weather: 73 °F (23 °C) (Clear & Sunny)
- Game attendance: 67,523
- Referee: Ron Winter
- TV announcers (CBS): Dick Enberg (play-by-play) and Randy Cross (color commentator)
- Box score

Game information

First quarter

- SDG – LaDainian Tomlinson 3-yard run (Nate Kaeding kick), 9:24. Chargers 7–0. Drive: 8 plays, 56 yards, 4:36.
- SDG – LaDainian Tomlinson 27-yard run (Nate Kaeding kick), 6:51. Chargers 14–0. Drive: 8 plays, 56 yards, 4:36.

Second quarter

- OAK – Thomas Howard 66-yard interception return (Sebastian Janikowski kick), 6:54. Chargers 14–7. Drive: 8 plays, 27 yards, 3:54.

Third quarter

- SDG – LaDainian Tomlinson 13-yard run (Nate Kaeding kick), 9:42. Chargers 21–7. Drive: 8 plays, 56 yards, 4:36.

Fourth quarter

- OAK – Zach Miller 1-yard pass from Daunte Culpepper (Sebastian Janikowski kick), 5:18. Chargers 21–14. Drive: 8 plays, 27 yards, 3:54.
- SDG – LaDainian Tomlinson 41-yard run (Nate Kaeding kick), 2:43. Chargers 28–14. Drive: 8 plays, 56 yards, 4:36.

Top passers

- OAK – Daunte Culpepper – 24/37, 229 yards, TD, 2 INT
- SDG – Philip Rivers – 14/21, 156 yards, INT

Top rushers

- OAK – LaMont Jordan – 18 rushes, 42 yards
- SDG – LaDainian Tomlinson – 24 rushes, 198 yards, 4 TD

Top receivers

- OAK – Ronald Curry – 6 receptions, 73 yards
- SDG – Antonio Gates – 3 receptions, 58 yards

Coming off of their blowout divisional road win over the Broncos, the Chargers went home for a Week 6 divisional duel with the Oakland Raiders. In the first quarter, the Chargers came out striking with RB LaDainian Tomlinson got a 3-yard and a 27-yard TD run. In the second quarter, the Raiders managed to get on the board with LB Thomas Howard returning an interception 66 yards for a touchdown, along with the only score of the period. In the third quarter, San Diego went back to work with Tomlinson getting a 13-yard TD run for the only score of the period. In the fourth quarter, Oakland tried to salvage a comeback as QB Daunte Culpepper threw a 1-yard TD pass to TE Zach Miller. However, the Chargers sealed the victory a 41-yard TD run by Tomlinson.

With the win, the Chargers entered their bye week at 3–3.

==== Week 8: vs. Houston Texans ====
Week 8: Houston Texans at San Diego Chargers

Quarter	1	2	3	4	Total
Texans	0	3	0	7	10
Chargers	14	21	0	0	35

at Qualcomm Stadium, San Diego, California

- Date: October 28
- Game time: 1:05 p.m. PDT
- Game weather: 78 °F (26 °C) (Slight Haze)
- Game attendance: 60,439
- Referee: Bill Leavy
- TV announcers (CBS): Greg Gumbel (play-by-play) and Dan Dierdorf (color commentator)
- Box score

Game information

First quarter

- SDG – Antonio Gates 49-yard pass from Philip Rivers (Nate Kaeding kick), 5:49. Chargers 7–0. Drive: 4 plays, 80 yards, 2:03.
- SDG – Antonio Cromartie fumble recovery in end zone (Nate Kaeding kick), 3:38. Chargers 14–0.

Second quarter

- HOU – Kris Brown 40-yard field goal, 14:07. Chargers 14–3. Drive: 10 plays, 56 yards, 4:31.
- SDG – Antonio Gates 31-yard pass from Philip Rivers (Nate Kaeding kick), 12:00. Chargers 21–3. Drive: 4 plays, 64 yards, 2:07.
- SDG – Antonio Cromartie 70-yard interception return (Nate Kaeding kick), 9:52. Chargers 28–3.
- SDG – Chris Chambers 14-yard pass from Philip Rivers (Nate Kaeding kick), 2:31. Chargers 35–3. Drive: 8 plays, 51 yards, 4:58.

Third quarter

- No scoring plays.

Fourth quarter

- SDG – Joel Dreessen 28-yard pass from Sage Rosenfels (Kris Brown kick), 4:40. Chargers 35–10. Drive: 12 plays, 94 yards, 6:53.

Top passers

- HOU – Sage Rosenfels – 17/27, 176 yards, TD, 2 INT
- SDG – Philip Rivers – 7/11, 130 yards, 3 TD

Top rushers

- HOU – Adimchinobe Echemandu – 10 rushes, 67 yards
- SDG – LaDainian Tomlinson – 17 rushes, 90 yards

Top receivers

- HOU – Kevin Walter – 7 receptions, 77 yards
- SDG – Antonio Gates – 3 receptions, 92 yards, 2 TD

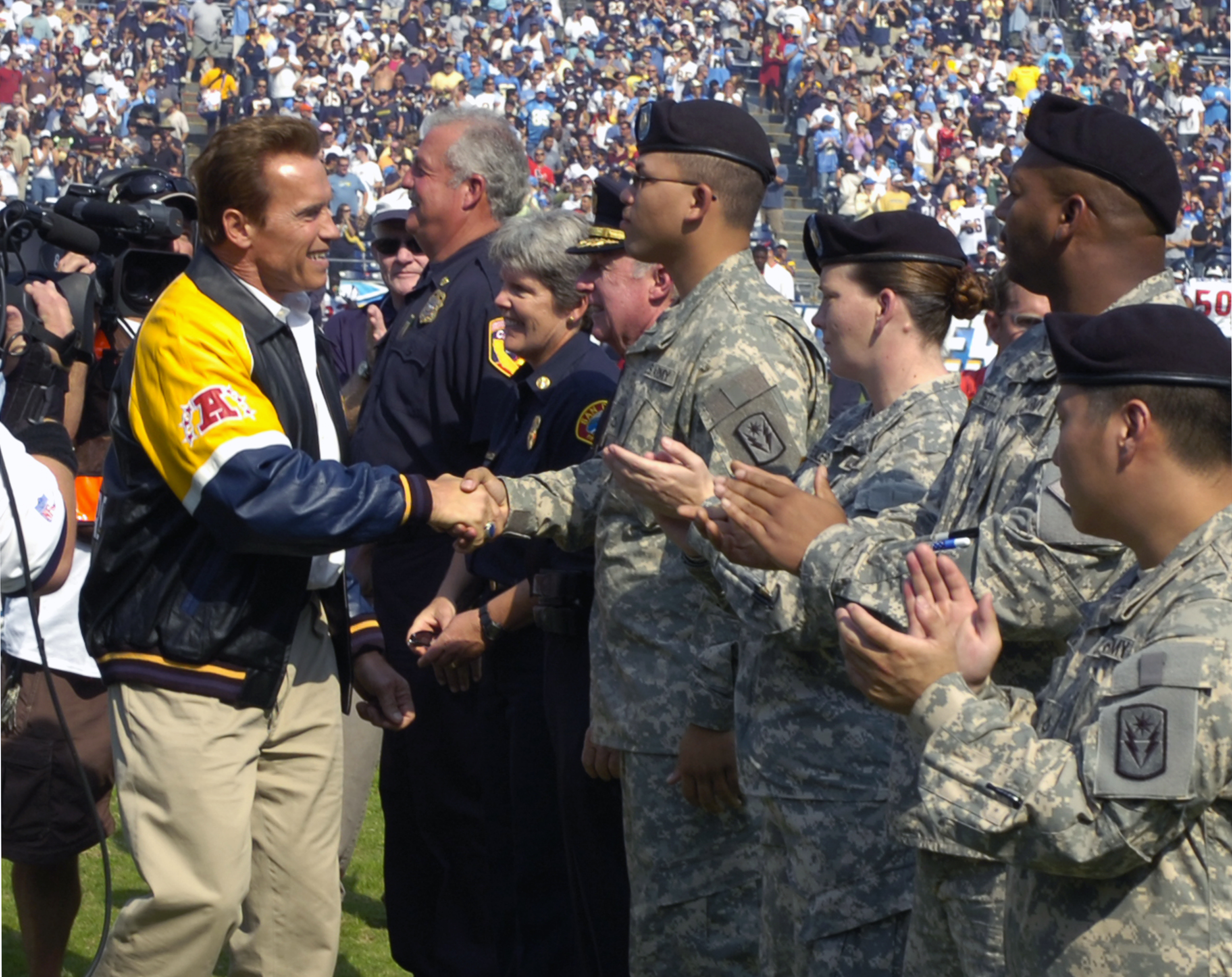
Governor Schwarzenegger thanks California Army National Guard for their efforts during the Southern California wildfires.

After speculation about the games location because of the ongoing California wildfires, it was confirmed on October 26, 2007, that Qualcomm Stadium would no longer be an evacuation site for San Diego residents, with most of the evacuees moved to Del Mar. Before, sites in the Phoenix area were being considered to host the game, as well as Houston's Reliant Stadium, and also the Dallas Cowboys’ Texas Stadium. Before the game a special tribute was paid to at the stadium for the fire fighters, National Guard, and volunteers who assisted in fighting the fires and helping the evacuees. Governor Arnold Schwarzenegger attended the game and flipped the coin, which the Chargers won. With an emotional charge from both the players and fans, as well as some victims, the Chargers played one of the best games of their season. Philip Rivers threw 3 touchdown passes despite only throwing 11 passes. Two TDs went to tight end Antonio Gates, and the remainder went to newly acquired wideout Chris Chambers, who was just traded from the Miami Dolphins a two weeks earlier and played his first game as a Charger (due to San Diego's bye week). However, that performance was second to second-year corner Antonio Cromartie, who performance included two interceptions, and two defensive touchdowns. He had a 70-yard INT return for a score, and the other was a complicated snap where the Texans snapped the ball over punter Matt Turk’s head, and the ball fell into the end zone. Quickly having to recover, Turk missed grabbing the ball and it fell into the hands of Cromartie, easily scoring. The Chargers won, 35–10 in a home blowout, which was, in the quote of LaDainian Tomlinson, "one for the fans.”

With this win, the Chargers improved to 4–3.

==== Week 9: at Minnesota Vikings ====
Week 9: San Diego Chargers at Minnesota Vikings

Quarter	1	2	3	4	Total
Chargers	7	7	0	3	17
Vikings	7	0	14	14	35

at the Hubert H. Humphrey Metrodome, Minneapolis, Minnesota

- Date: November 4
- Game time: 12:00 p.m. CST
- Game weather: Indoors
- Game attendance: 60,043
- Referee: Mike Carey
- TV announcers (CBS): Greg Gumbel (play-by-play) and Dan Dierdorf (color commentator)
- Box score

Game information

First quarter

- SDG – LaDainian Tomlinson 1-yard run (Nate Kaeding kick), 5:44. Chargers 7–0. Drive: 5 plays, 39 yards, 2:55.
- MIN – Adrian Peterson 1-yard run (Ryan Longwell kick), 2:49. Tied 7–7. Drive: 10 plays, 53 yards, 5:39.

Second quarter

- SDG – Antonio Cromartie 109-yard field goal return (Nate Kaeding kick), 0:00. Chargers 14–7.

Third quarter

- MIN – Adrian Peterson 64-yard run (Ryan Longwell kick), 12:44. Tied 14–14. Drive: 6 plays, 83 yards, 2:16.
- MIN – Sidney Rice 40-yard pass from Brooks Bollinger (Ryan Longwell kick), 3:07. Vikings 21–14. Drive: 6 plays, 81 yards, 3:37.

Fourth quarter

- SDG – Nate Kaeding 36-yard field goal, 14:09. Vikings 21–17. Drive: 10 plays, 79 yards, 6:09.
- MIN – Adrian Peterson 46-yard run (Ryan Longwell kick), 7:44. Vikings 28–17. Drive: 1 play, 46 yards, 0:10.
- MIN – Chester Taylor 2-yard run (Ryan Longwell kick), 4:28. Vikings 35–17. Drive: 5 plays, 40 yards, 3:02.

Top passers

- SDG – Philip Rivers – 19/42, 197 yards, INT
- MIN – Brooks Bollinger – 7/10, 95 yards, TD

Top rushers

- SDG – LaDainian Tomlinson – 16 rushes, 40 yards, TD
- MIN – Adrian Peterson – 30 rushes, 296 yards, 3 TD

Top receivers

- SDG – Chris Chambers – 5 receptions, 59 yards
- MIN – Sidney Rice – 4 receptions, 66 yards, TD

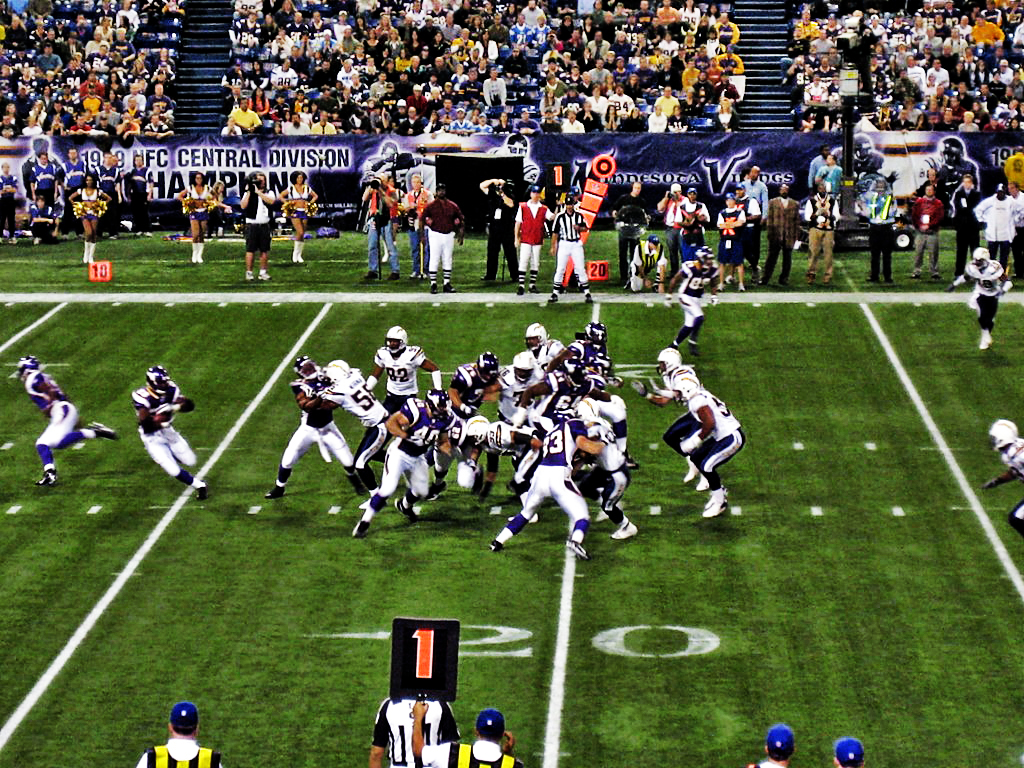
The Chargers on defense against Minnesota, week 9

After an emotional home win over the Texans, the Chargers flew to the Hubert H. Humphrey Metrodome for a Week 9 interconference duel with the Minnesota Vikings. In the first quarter, San Diego struck first with RB LaDainian Tomlinson getting a 1-yard TD run. The Vikings responded with RB Adrian Peterson getting a 1-yard TD run. In the second quarter, there was no scoring until the final play of the half, as CB Antonio Cromartie returned a missed field goal 109 yards for a touchdown, the longest play in NFL history.

In the third quarter, things started to get grim for San Diego as Minnesota took the lead with Peterson getting a 64-yard TD run and QB Brooks Bollinger completing a 40-yard TD pass to WR Sidney Rice. In the fourth quarter, the Chargers tried to come back as kicker Nate Kaeding nailed a 36-yard field goal. The Vikings sealed the win with Peterson getting a 46-yard TD run, along with RB Chester Taylor getting a 2-yard TD run. LaDainian Tomlinson, despite getting only 1 rushing touchdown, managed to surpass Jim Brown for most career rushing touchdowns with his 107th TD.

With the loss, San Diego fell to 4–4.

During the game, Minnesota rookie running back Adrian Peterson broke the NFL single-game rushing record with 296 yards rushing on 30 carries.

==== Week 10: vs. Indianapolis Colts ====
Week 10: Indianapolis Colts at San Diego Chargers

Quarter	1	2	3	4	Total
Colts	0	7	0	14	21
Chargers	16	7	0	0	23

at Qualcomm Stadium, San Diego, California

- Date: November 11
- Game time: 5:15 p.m. PST
- Game weather: 61 °F (16 °C) (Light Rain)
- Game attendance: 67,726
- Referee: Gene Steratore
- TV announcers (NBC): Al Michaels (play-by-play), John Madden (color commentator) and Andrea Kremer (sideline reporter)
- Box score

Game information

First quarter

- SDG – Darren Sproles 89-yard kickoff return (Nate Kaeding kick), 14:47. Chargers 7–0. Drive: 0 plays, 0 yards, 0:13.
- SDG – Nate Kaeding 33-yard field goal, 7:14. Chargers 10–0. Drive: 6 plays, 17 yards, 2:14.
- SDG – Darren Sproles 45-yard punt return (pass failed), 5:55. Chargers 16–0.

Second quarter

- SDG – LaDainian Tomlinson 4-yard run (Nate Kaeding kick), 8:47. Chargers 23–0. Drive: 12 plays, 45 yards, 5:31.
- IND – Reggie Wayne 8-yard pass from Peyton Manning (Adam Vinatieri kick), 2:42. Chargers 23–7. Drive: 12 plays, 67 yards, 6:05.

Third quarter

- No scoring plays.

Fourth quarter

- IND – Kenton Keith 7-yard pass from Peyton Manning (Bryan Fletcher pass from Peyton Manning), 14:53. Chargers 23–15. Drive: 12 plays, 90 yards, 5:16.
- IND – Gary Brackett fumble recovery in end zone (pass failed), 14:28. Chargers 23–21.

Top passers

- IND – Peyton Manning – 34/56, 328 yards, 2 TD, 6 INT
- SDG – Philip Rivers – 13/24, 104 yards, 2 INT

Top rushers

- IND – Joseph Addai – 22 rushes, 56 yards
- SDG – LaDainian Tomlinson – 21 rushes, 76 yards, TD

Top receivers

- IND – Reggie Wayne – 10 receptions, 140 yards, TD
- SDG – Vincent Jackson – 2 receptions, 28 yards

After an upset loss to the Vikings, the Chargers faced the defending Super Bowl champions in San Diego following their first loss of the season to the New England Patriots. Darren Sproles return the opening kickoff 89 yards for a touchdown. After a Nate Kaeding field goal, Sproles returned a punt 45 yards for his second special teams touchdown of the game with less than 6 minutes left in the first quarter. The PAT snap wasn't held and the PAT failed. Peyton Manning threw four interceptions in the first quarter alone. In the second quarter the Chargers put together a 45-yard drive resulting in a 4-yard touchdown run by LaDainian Tomlinson. Manning was able to score a touchdown to Reggie Wayne leaving the score 23–7 at halftime.

After a scoreless third quarter Manning threw a touchdown to Kenton Keith and the Colts were able to complete the two-point conversion. On third and 10 from the Chargers 8-yard line, Philip Rivers went back to pass and the ball slipped out of his hand and into the end zone. Colts linebacker Gary Brackett picked up the ball for a touchdown with 14:28 to play. The Colts failed the two-point conversion. With six minutes left in the game Rivers threw an interception to rookie Clint Session. In the red zone the Colts picked up the first down, but the booth reviewed the play and it was determined to be fourth and inches. The Colts intended to go for the first down, but a false start penalty by Ben Utecht moved them five yards back, and instead they went for the field goal. With 1:31 left the Colts lined up the kicking team for a game-winning field goal, but Adam Vinatieri’s 29-yard kick was wide right. The Chargers ran down the clock and the Colts had 22 seconds to score, but the game ended with Clinton Hart intercepting the ball with time expiring for the Chargers win. Manning set a franchise record by throwing six interceptions in one game (3 to Antonio Cromartie and one apiece to Clinton Hart, Matt Wilhelm, and Shaun Philips).

Both teams had significant injuries coming into the game. For the Chargers CB Quentin Jammer and DE Luis Castillo were out of the game. The Colts had 10 players out of the game including TE Dallas Clark, WR Marvin Harrison, and OT Tony Ugoh. Dwight Freeney left the game with an injured foot.

With the win, the Chargers improved to 5–4. With Kansas City losing to Denver, San Diego retained first place in the AFC West.

==== Week 11 at Jacksonville Jaguars ====
Week 11: San Diego Chargers at Jacksonville Jaguars

Quarter	1	2	3	4	Total
Chargers	0	3	7	7	17
Jaguars	10	7	7	0	24

at Jacksonville Municipal Stadium • Jacksonville, Florida

- Date: November 18
- Game time: 1:03 p.m. EST
- Game weather: 70 °F (21 °C) (Mostly cloudy)
- Game attendance: 66,732
- Referee: Larry Nemmers
- TV announcers (CBS): Greg Gumbel & Dan Dierdorf
- Box score

Game information

First quarter

- JAC – Josh Scobee 48-yard field goal, 9:12. Jaguars 3–0. Drive: 12 plays, 46 yards, 5:48.
- JAC – Maurice Jones-Drew 1-yard run (Josh Scobee kick), 0:40. Jaguars 10–0. Drive: 11 plays, 48 yards, 5:19.

Second quarter

- SDG – Nate Kaeding 36-yard field goal, 9:58. Jaguars 10–3. Drive: 12 plays, 75 yards, 5:42.
- JAC – Reggie Williams 36-yard pass from David Garrard (Josh Scobee kick), 5:25. Jaguars 17–3. Drive: 9 plays, 73 yards, 4:33.

Third quarter

- SDG – LaDainian Tomlinson 6-yard run (Nate Kaeding kick), 13:19. Jaguars 17–10. Drive: 5 plays, 60 yards, 1:41.
- JAC – Marcedes Lewis 1-yard pass from David Garrard (Josh Scobee kick), 5:02. Jaguars 24–10. Drive: 5 plays, 87 yards, 2:59.

Fourth quarter

- SDG – Antonio Gates 24-yard pass from Philip Rivers (Nate Kaeding kick), 5:06. Jaguars 24–17. Drive: 7 plays, 90 yards, 1:57.

Top passers

- SDG – Philip Rivers – 22/40, 309 yards, TD, 2 INT
- JAC – David Garrard – 15/24, 189 yards, 2 TD

Top rushers

- SDG – LaDainian Tomlinson – 16 rushes, 62 yards, TD
- JAC – Fred Taylor – 20 rushes, 85 yards

Top receivers

- SDG – LaDainian Tomlinson – 5 receptions, 93 yards
  SDG – Chris Chambers – 4 receptions, 93 yards
- JAC – Reggie Williams – 2 receptions, 62 yards, TD

Coming off their win over the Colts, the Chargers flew to Jacksonville Municipal Stadium for a Week 11 intraconference duel with the Jacksonville Jaguars. In the first quarter, San Diego trailed early as Jaguars kicker Josh Scobee managed to get a 48-yard field goal, along with RB Maurice Jones-Drew getting a 1-yard TD run. In the second quarter, the Chargers got on the board with kicker Nate Kaeding getting a 23-yard field goal. However, Jacksonville responded with QB David Garrard completing a 36-yard TD pass to WR Reggie Williams.

In the third quarter, San Diego responded with RB LaDainian Tomlinson getting a 6-yard TD run, yet the Jaguars answered with Garrard completing a 1-yard TD pass to TE Marcedes Lewis. In the fourth quarter, the Chargers tried to make a comeback as QB Philip Rivers completed a 24-yard TD pass to TE Antonio Gates which would be the last scoring play as Jacksonville's defense held on to win.

With the loss, San Diego fell to 5–5.

==== Week 12: vs. Baltimore Ravens ====
Week 12: Baltimore Ravens at San Diego Chargers

Quarter	1	2	3	4	Total
Ravens	0	7	7	0	14
Chargers	0	22	7	3	32

at Qualcomm Stadium, San Diego, California

- Date: November 25
- Game time: 1:15 p.m. PST
- Game weather: 70 °F (21 °C) (Cloudy)
- Game attendance: 63,337
- Referee: Tony Corrente
- TV announcers (CBS): Dick Enberg (play-by-play) and Randy Cross (color commentator)
- Box score

Game information

First quarter

- No scoring plays.

Second quarter

- SDG – Nate Kaeding 27-yard field goal, 13:11. Chargers 3–0. Drive: 10 plays, 47 yards, 4:31.
- BAL – Willis McGahee 1-yard run (Matt Stover kick), 9:59. Ravens 7–3. Drive: 6 plays, 37 yards, 3:12.
- SDG – Antonio Gates 35-yard pass from Philip Rivers (kick failed), 7:16. Chargers 9–7. Drive: 7 plays, 60 yards, 2:43.
- SDG – Nate Kaeding 46-yard field goal, 5:09. Chargers 12–7. Drive: 4 plays, 2 yards, 0:43.
- SDG – Chris Chambers 5-yard pass from Philip Rivers (Nate Kaeding kick), 0:25. Chargers 19–7. Drive: 9 plays, 49 yards, 3:22.
- SDG – Nate Kaeding 41-yard field goal, 0:03. Chargers 22–7. Drive: 3 plays, 11 yards, 0:22.

Third quarter

- SDG – Antonio Gates 25-yard pass from Philip Rivers (Nate Kaeding kick), 11:30. Chargers 29–7. Drive: 6 plays, 72 yards, 3:30.
- BAL – Le'Ron McClain 13-yard pass from Kyle Boller (Matt Stover kick), 5:39. Chargers 29–14. Drive: 11 plays, 69 yards, 5:51.

Fourth quarter

- SDG – Nate Kaeding 41-yard field goal, 8:41. Chargers 32–14. Drive: 11 plays, 65 yards, 6:11.

Top passers

- BAL – Kyle Boller – 21/33, 191 yards, TD
- SDG – Philip Rivers – 25/35, 249 yards, 3 TD

Top rushers

- BAL – Willis McGahee – 17 rushes, 59 yards, TD
- SDG – LaDainian Tomlinson – 24 rushes, 77 yards

Top receivers

- BAL – Derrick Mason – 7 receptions, 99 yards
- SDG – Antonio Gates – 6 receptions, 102 yards, 2 TD

Hoping to rebound from their road loss to the Jaguars, the Chargers went home for a Week 12 duel with the Baltimore Ravens. After a scoreless first quarter, San Diego struck first with kicker Nate Kaeding getting a 27-yard field goal. Afterwards, the Ravens took the lead with RB Willis McGahee getting a 1-yard TD run. The Chargers regained the lead with QB Philip Rivers completing a 35-yard TD pass to TE Antonio Gates (with a failed PAT), Kaeding kicking a 46-yard field goal, Rivers completing a 5-yard TD pass to WR Chris Chambers, and Kaeding kicking a 41-yard field goal.

In the third quarter, San Diego increased its lead with Rivers and Gates hooking up with each other again on a 25-yard TD pass. Baltimore managed one final score as Ravens QB Kyle Boller completed a 13-yard TD pass to FB Le'Ron McClain. In the fourth quarter, the Chargers sealed the win with Kaeding nailing a 41-yard field goal.

With the win, the Chargers improved to 6–5.

RB LaDainian Tomlinson (24 carries for 77 yards) became the fourth-fastest player and the 23rd player in NFL history to get 10,000 career rushing yards.

==== Week 13: at Kansas City Chiefs ====
Week 13: San Diego Chargers at Kansas City Chiefs

Quarter	1	2	3	4	Total
Chargers	3	7	7	7	24
Chiefs	3	7	0	0	10

at Arrowhead Stadium, Kansas City, Missouri

- Date: December 2
- Game time: 12:00 p.m. CST
- Game weather: 34 °F (1 °C) (Partly Cloudy)
- Game attendance: 74,874
- Referee: Ed Hochuli
- TV announcers (CBS): Dick Enberg (play-by-play) and Randy Cross (color commentator)
- Box score

Game information

First quarter

- KAN – John Carney 38-yard field goal, 10:50. Chiefs 3–0. Drive: 6 plays, 44 yards, 2:18.
- SDG – Nate Kaeding 25-yard field goal, 5:24. Tied 3–3. Drive: 9 plays, 63 yards, 5:26.

Second quarter

- KAN – Jared Allen 2-yard pass from Damon Huard (John Carney kick), 5:23. Chiefs 10–3. Drive: 10 plays, 64 yards, 5:53.
- SDG – Vincent Jackson 38-yard pass from Philip Rivers (Nate Kaeding kick), 3:29. Tied 10–10. Drive: 5 plays, 51 yards, 1:54.

Third quarter

- SDG – LaDainian Tomlinson 31-yard run (Nate Kaeding kick), 12:16. Chargers 17–10. Drive: 4 plays, 58 yards, 1:19.

Fourth quarter

- SDG – LaDainian Tomlinson 28-yard run (Nate Kaeding kick), 10:15. Chargers 24–10. Drive: 6 plays, 80 yards, 2:40.

Top passers

- SDG – Philip Rivers – 10/21, 157 yards, TD, INT
- KAN – Damon Huard – 19/34, 186 yards, TD, 2 INT

Top rushers

- SDG – LaDainian Tomlinson – 23 rushes, 177 yards, 2 TD
- KAN – Kolby Smith – 21 rushes, 83 yards

Top receivers

- SDG – Chris Chambers – 2 receptions, 50 yards
- KAN – Tony Gonzalez – 10 receptions, 140 yards

Coming off their home win over the Ravens, the Chargers flew to Arrowhead Stadium for a Week 13 AFC West rematch with the Kansas City Chiefs. In the first quarter, San Diego trailed early as Chiefs kicker John Carney managed to get a 38-yard field goal. Afterwards, the Chargers got on the board with kicker Nate Kaeding nailing a 25-yard field goal. In the second quarter, Kansas City regained the lead as QB Damon Huard completed a 2-yard TD pass to DE Jared Allen. Afterwards, San Diego tied the game again as QB Philip Rivers completed a 38-yard TD pass to WR Vincent Jackson.

In the second quarter, the Chargers pulled away as RB LaDainian Tomlinson got a 31-yard TD run in the third quarter and a 28-yard TD run in the fourth quarter. His two rushing touchdowns helped him surpass Walter Payton for third place on the NFL's all-time rushing touchdowns list. The game also gave him his 3rd-straight 100-yard game against the Chiefs. Also, CB Antonio Cromartie recorded 2 INT to bring his league leading total to 8.

With this win, San Diego improved to 7–5.

==== Week 14: at Tennessee Titans ====
Week 14: San Diego Chargers at Tennessee Titans

Quarter	1	2	3	4	OT	Total
Chargers	0	0	3	14	6	23
Titans	3	0	7	7	0	17

at LP Field, Nashville, Tennessee

- Date: December 9
- Game time: 12:02 p.m. CST
- Game weather: 69 °F (21 °C) (Cloudy with Sprinkles)
- Game attendance: 69,143
- Referee: Bill Carollo
- TV announcers (CBS): Greg Gumbel (play-by-play) and Dan Dierdorf (color commentator)
- Box score

Game information

First quarter

- TEN – Rob Bironas 44-yard field goal, 5:19. Titans 3–0. Drive: 4 plays, 3 yards, 1:59.

Second quarter

- No scoring plays.

Third quarter

- SDG – Nate Kaeding 20-yard field goal, 11:43. Tied 3–3. Drive: 5 plays, 39 yards, 2:00.
- TEN – Chris Brown 7-yard run (Rob Bironas) kick, 5:17. Titans 10–3. Drive: 4 plays, 19 yards, 2:00.

Fourth quarter

- TEN – LenDale White 7-yard run (Rob Bironas) kick, 14:21. Titans 17–3. Drive: 7 plays, 42 yards, 4:06.
- SDG – LaDainian Tomlinson 7-yard pass from Philip Rivers (Nate Kaeding kick), 7:29. Titans 17–10. Drive: 4 plays, 48 yards, 1:32.
- SDG – Antonio Gates 2-yard pass from Philip Rivers (Nate Kaeding kick), 0:09. Tied 17–17. Drive: 14 plays, 80 yards, 2:15.

Overtime

- SDG – LaDainian Tomlinson 16-yard run, 7:29. Chargers 23–17. Drive: 6 plays, 48 yards, 3:15.

Top passers

- SDG – Philip Rivers – 21/40, 228 yards, 2 TD, 2 INT
- TEN – Vince Young – 13/21, 121 yards, 2 INT

Top rushers

- SDG – LaDainian Tomlinson – 26 rushes, 146 yards, TD
- TEN – LenDale White – 30 rushes, 113 yards, TD

Top receivers

- SDG – Chris Chambers – 4 receptions, 90 yards
- TEN – Roydell Williams – 3 receptions, 30 yards

Coming off their divisional road win over the Chiefs, the Chargers flew to LP Field for a Week 14 intraconference duel with the Tennessee Titans. In the first quarter, San Diego trailed early as Titans kicker Rob Bironas managed to get a 44-yard field goal for the only score of the half.

In the third quarter, the Chargers got on the board as kicker Nate Kaeding nailed a 20-yard field goal, yet Tennessee responded with RB Chris Brown getting a 7-yard TD run. In the fourth quarter, the Titans increased their lead with RB LenDale White getting a 7-yard TD run. San Diego tied the game with QB Philip Rivers completing a 7-yard TD pass to RB LaDainian Tomlinson and a 2-yard TD pass to TE Antonio Gates. In overtime, the Chargers got the win with Tomlinson getting the game-winning 16-yard TD run.

With the win, the Chargers improved to 8–5.

For Tomlinson, it was his 3rd overtime touchdown (the most in NFL history).

For CB Antonio Cromartie, his lone interception gave him 9 on the year, tying the franchise single-season record set by Charlie McNeil in 1961.

==== Week 15: vs. Detroit Lions ====
Week 15: Detroit Lions at San Diego Chargers

Quarter	1	2	3	4	Total
Lions	0	7	7	0	14
Chargers	17	17	10	7	51

at Qualcomm Stadium, San Diego, California

- Date: December 16
- Game time: 1:15 p.m. PST
- Game weather: 67 °F or 19.4 °C (Clear)
- Game attendance: 66,505
- Referee: Mike Carey
- TV announcers (FOX): Sam Rosen (play-by-play), Tim Ryan (color commentator) and Chris Myers (sideline reporter)
- Box score

Game information

First quarter

- SDG – LaDainian Tomlinson 6-yard run (Nate Kaeding kick), 10:04. Chargers 7–0. Drive: 7 plays, 62 yards, 3:22.
- SDG – Nate Kaeding 22-yard field goal, 3:06. Chargers 10–0. Drive: 11 plays, 77 yards, 5:46.
- SDG – LaDainian Tomlinson 2-yard run (Nate Kaeding kick), 1:13. Chargers 17–0. Drive: 13 plays, 17 yards, 0:58.

Second quarter

- SDG – Nate Kaeding 22-yard field goal, 8:36. Chargers 20–0. Drive: 11 plays, 47 yards, 6:18.
- SDG – Shaun Phillips 18-yard interception return (Nate Kaeding kick), 8:23. Chargers 27–0.
- DET – Brandon Middleton 9-yard pass from Jon Kitna (Jason Hanson kick), 2:50. Chargers 27–7. Drive: 11 plays, 66 yards, 5:33.
- SDG – Brandon Manumaleuna 1-yard pass from Philip Rivers (Nate Kaeding kick), 0:27. Chargers 34–7. Drive: 8 plays, 79 yards, 2:23.

Third quarter

- SDG – Darren Sproles 1-yard run (Nate Kaeding kick), 8:35. Chargers 41–7. Drive: 13 plays, 85 yards, 6:25.
- SDG – Nate Kaeding 45-yard field goal, 5:52. Chargers 44–7. Drive: 4 plays, -3 yards, 2:35.
- DET – Shaun McDonald 17-yard pass from Jon Kitna (Jason Hanson kick), 3:03. Chargers 44–14. Drive: 10 plays, 69 yards, 2:49.

Fourth quarter

- SDG – Darren Sproles 11-yard run (Nate Kaeding kick), 2:58. Chargers 51–14. Drive: 6 plays, 27 yards, 3:42.

Top passers

- DET – Jon Kitna – 26/45, 302 yards, 2 TD, 5 INT
- SDG – Philip Rivers – 14/21, 142 yards, TD

Top rushers

- DET – Kevin Jones – 5 rushes, 16 yards
- SDG – Darren Sproles – 25 rushes, 122 yards, 2 TD

Top receivers

- DET – Calvin Johnson – 5 receptions, 102 yards
- SDG – Chris Chambers – 4 receptions, 69 yards

Coming off their overtime road win over the Titans, the Chargers went home for a Week 15 interconference duel with the Detroit Lions. The Chargers struck first with RB LaDainian Tomlinson getting a 6-yard TD run, Kicker Nate Kaeding getting a 22-yard field goal, and Tomlinson getting a 2-yard TD run. In the second quarter, San Diego continued its domination with Kaeding getting a 22-yard field goal and LB Shaun Phillips returning an interception 18 yards for a touchdown. The Lions got on the board with QB Jon Kitna completing a 9-yard TD pass to WR Brandon Middleton. The Chargers ended the scoring for the half with QB Philip Rivers completing a 1-yard TD run to TE Brandon Manumaleuna.

In the third quarter, San Diego continued its annihilation with RB Darren Sproles getting a 1-yard TD run and Kaeding nailing a 45-yard field goal. Detroit got its final points of the game as Kitna completed a 17-yard TD pass to WR Shaun McDonald. In the fourth quarter, the Chargers ended their day with Sproles getting an 11-yard TD run.

With this win, not only did the Chargers improve to 9–5, but they also clinched their second-straight AFC West title.

For Darren Sproles (25 attempts for 122 yards and 2 touchdowns) and LaDainian Tomlinson (15 attempts for 116 yards and 2 touchdowns), they became the first RB duo in franchise history to both get 100 rushing yards in the same game. Also, Tomlinson ended this part of his career with 127 career touchdowns, surpassing Jim Brown for 7th All-Time.

Also, CB Antonio Cromartie received his 10th interception.

==== Week 16: vs. Denver Broncos ====
Week 16: Denver Broncos at San Diego Chargers

Quarter	1	2	3	4	Total
Broncos	0	0	3	0	3
Chargers	10	6	7	0	23

at Qualcomm Stadium, San Diego, California

- Date: December 24
- Game time: 5:10 p.m. PST
- Game weather: 62 °F (17 °C) (Clear)
- Game attendance: 65,477
- Referee: John Parry
- TV announcers (ESPN): Mike Tirico (play-by-play), Tony Kornheiser (color commentator) and Ron Jaworski (color commentator)
- Box score

Game information

First quarter

- SDG – Nate Kaeding 40-yard field goal, 7:30. Chargers 3–0. Drive: 10 plays, 61 yards, 5:10.
- SDG – LaDainian Tomlinson 17-yard run (Nate Kaeding kick), 1:51. Chargers 10–0. Drive: 5 plays, 44 yards, 2:55.

Second quarter

- SDG – Nate Kaeding 23-yard field goal, 3:43. Chargers 13–0. Drive: 9 plays, 38 yards, 4:37.
- SDG – Nate Kaeding 29-yard field goal, 0:00. Chargers 16–0. Drive: 10 plays, 54 yards, 2:33.

Third quarter

- SDG – Chris Chambers 14-yard pass from Philip Rivers (Nate Kaeding kick), 7:56. Chargers 23–0. Drive: 11 plays, 84 yards, 7:04.
- DEN – Jason Elam 23-yard field goal, 2:47. Chargers 23–3. Drive: 4 plays, 2 yards, 0:48.

Fourth quarter

- No scoring plays.

Top passers

- DEN – Jay Cutler – 14/32, 155 yards, 2 INT
- SDG – Philip Rivers – 17/25, 189 yards, TD

Top rushers

- DEN – Jay Cutler – 3 rushes, 42 yards
- SDG – LaDainian Tomlinson – 19 rushes, 107 yards, TD

Top receivers

- DEN – Brandon Marshall – 6 receptions, 75 yards
- SDG – Chris Chambers – 4 receptions, 71 yards, TD

Trying to make it 5 straight wins and stay in contention for the No. 3 seed in the AFC playoffs, the Chargers continued their domination over the Denver Broncos on Christmas Eve. Not only did they stop them from scoring a touchdown for the second time this season they also made it 4 straight victories over Denver.

The game started off inauspiciously for the Broncos when Denver QB Jay Cutler fumbled the ball leading to a 40-yard K Nate Kaeding field goal for San Diego, and after a 3 and out, the Chargers gave the ball to RB LaDainian Tomlinson for a 17-yard TD run.

The second quarter was relatively quiet as 2 Kaeding Field goals (23-yards & 29-yards) gave the Chargers a 16-point lead going into halftime.

In the third quarter San Diego QB Philip Rivers and WR Chris Chambers hooked up on a 14-yard pass and catch to make the score 23–0. Denver finally began to move offensively until a tipped pass was intercepted by San Diego SS Clinton Hart, but some defensive miscues including a San Diego QB Billy Volek fumble led to a 23-yard field goal by Denver K Jason Elam.

In the fourth quarter the defense stepped up for the Chargers on two fourth down plays and a Quentin Jammer interception sealed the victory for San Diego.

The result ensured that a San Diego win at Oakland would secure the No. 3 seed in the AFC playoffs.

The win in Denver at home made San Diego only the second team in NFL history to shut out every opponent at home in the first quarter, outscoring opponents 81–0.

With the win, the Chargers improved to 10–5.

==== Week 17: at Oakland Raiders ====
Week 17: San Diego Chargers at Oakland Raiders

Quarter	1	2	3	4	Total
Chargers	7	7	10	6	30
Raiders	7	3	7	0	17

at McAfee Coliseum, Oakland, California

- Date: December 30
- Game time: 1:15 p.m. PST
- Game weather: 54 °F (12 °C) (Cloudy)
- Game attendance: 61,706
- Referee: Terry McAulay
- TV announcers (CBS): Greg Gumbel (play-by-play) and Dan Dierdorf (color commentator)
- Box score

Game information

First quarter

- SDG – LaDainian Tomlinson 7-yard pass from Philip Rivers (Nate Kaeding kick), 9:53. Chargers 7–0. Drive: 9 plays, 47 yards, 4:55.
- OAK – Dominic Rhodes 1-yard run (Sebastian Janikowski kick), 4:31. Tied 7–7. Drive: 3 plays, 35 yards, 1:14.

Second quarter

- SDG – Chris Chambers 19-yard pass from Philip Rivers (Nate Kaeding kick), 0:38. Chargers 14–7. Drive: 9 plays, 80 yards, 2:28.
- OAK – Sebastian Janikowski 53-yard field goal, 0:00. Chargers 14–10. Drive: 5 plays, 37 yards, 0:38.

Third quarter

- SDG – Nate Kaeding 36-yard field goal, 12:51. Chargers 17–10. Drive: 6 plays, 16 yards, 2:09.
- SDG – Jyles Tucker fumble recovery in end zone (Nate Kaeding kick), 7:12. Chargers 24–10.
- OAK – Jerry Porter 32-yard pass from JaMarcus Russell (Sebastian Janikowski kick), 1:19. Chargers 24–17. Drive: 2 plays, 40 yards, 0:45.

Fourth quarter

- SDG – Nate Kaeding 31-yard field goal, 13:36. Chargers 27–17. Drive: 6 plays, 32 yards, 2:43.
- SDG – Nate Kaeding 24-yard field goal, 1:46. Chargers 30–17. Drive: 4 plays, -2 yards, 0:46.

Top passers

- SDG – Philip Rivers – 13/23, 135 yards, 2 TD
- OAK – JaMarcus Russell – 23/31, 224 yards, TD, INT

Top rushers

- SDG – LaDainian Tomlinson – 16 rushes, 56 yards
- OAK – Dominic Rhodes – 29 rushes, 122 yards, TD

Top receivers

- SDG – Antonio Gates – 6 receptions, 62 yards
- OAK – Zach Miller – 8 receptions, 84 yards

Coming off their Christmas Eve victory of the Broncos, the Chargers ended the regular season at McAfee Coliseum for a Week 17 AFC West rematch with the Oakland Raiders. In the first quarter, San Diego struck first as QB Philip Rivers completing a 7-yard TD pass to RB LaDainian Tomlinson. The Raiders responded with RB Dominic Rhodes getting a 1-yard TD run. In the second quarter, the Chargers regained the lead with Rivers completing a 19-yard TD pass to WR Chris Chambers. Oakland ended the half with kicker Sebastian Janikowski getting a 53-yard field goal.

In the third quarter, the Chargers increased their lead with kicker Nate Kaeding getting a 36-yard field goal, along with rookie LB Jyles Tucker recovering a Raider fumble in the endzone for a touchdown. Oakland responded with QB JaMarcus Russell completing a 32-yard TD pass to WR Jerry Porter. In the fourth quarter, San Diego sealed the win with Kaeding nailing a 31-yard and a 24-yard field goal.

With the win, not only did the Chargers close out their regular season at 11–5, but they also secured the AFC's No. 3 seed.

=== Standings ===
AFC West
	W	L	T	PCT	DIV	CONF	PF	PA	STK
^{(3)} San Diego Chargers	11	5	0	.688	5–1	9–3	412	284	W6
Denver Broncos	7	9	0	.438	3–3	6–6	320	409	W1
Kansas City Chiefs	4	12	0	.250	2–4	3–9	226	335	L9
Oakland Raiders	4	12	0	.250	2–4	4–8	283	398	L4

== Postseason ==
Round	Date	Opponent (seed)	Result	Record	Venue	Recap
Wild Card	January 6, 2008	Tennessee Titans (6)	W 17–6	1–0	Qualcomm Stadium	Recap
Divisional	January 13, 2008	at Indianapolis Colts (2)	W 28–24	2–0	RCA Dome	Recap
AFC championship	January 20, 2008	at New England Patriots (1)	L 12–21	2–1	Gillette Stadium	Recap

=== Game summaries ===
==== AFC Wild Card Playoffs: vs. (6) Tennessee Titans ====
AFC Wild Card Playoffs: (6) Tennessee Titans at (3) San Diego Chargers – Game summary

Quarter	1	2	3	4	Total
Titans	3	3	0	0	6
Chargers	0	0	10	7	17

at Qualcomm Stadium, San Diego, California

- Date: January 6
- Game time: 1:30 p.m. PST
- Game weather: 69 °F (21 °C) relative humidity 82%, wind 8 mph
- Game attendance: 65,640
- Referee: Ed Hochuli
- TV announcers (CBS): Jim Nantz (play by play) & Phil Simms (color commentator)
- Box score

Game information

First quarter

- TEN – Rob Bironas 30-yard field goal, 9:37. Titans 3–0. Drive: 13 plays, 61 yards, 5:23.

Second quarter

- TEN – Rob Bironas 44-yard field goal, 0:00. Titans 6–0. Drive: 11 plays, 39 yards, 3:06.

Third quarter

- SDG – Nate Kaeding 20-yard field goal, 9:41. Titans 6–3. Drive: 12 plays, 86 yards, 5:19.
- SDG – Vincent Jackson 25-yard pass from Philip Rivers (Nate Kaeding kick), 2:35. Chargers 10–6. Drive: 7 plays, 78 yards, 3:54.

Fourth quarter

- SDG – LaDainian Tomlinson 1-yard run (Nate Kaeding kick), 8:45. Chargers 17–6. Drive: 12 plays, 72 yards, 5:18.

Top passers

- TEN – Vince Young – 16/29, 138 yards, INT
- SDG – Philip Rivers – 19/30, 292 yards, TD, INT

Top rushers

- TEN – LenDale White – 19 rushes, 69 yards
- SDG – LaDainian Tomlinson – 21 rushes, 42 yards, TD

Top receivers

- TEN – Ben Troupe – 3 receptions, 44 yards
- SDG – Chris Chambers – 6 receptions, 121 yards

Entering the playoffs as the AFC's No. 3 seed, the Chargers began their playoff run at home against the sixth-seeded Tennessee Titans, in a rematch of Week 14, which saw San Diego trail early, then rally to tie the game in the fourth quarter and win in overtime.

In the first half, the Chargers trailed early as Titans kicker Rob Bironas managed to get a 30-yard field goal in the first quarter and a 44-yard field goal in the second quarter. In the third quarter, the Chargers rallied to take the lead with kicker Nate Kaeding nailing a 20-yard field goal, along with QB Philip Rivers completing a 25-yard TD pass to WR Vincent Jackson. In the fourth quarter, San Diego pulled away with RB LaDainian Tomlinson getting a 1-yard TD run. However, San Diego Chargers tight end Antonio Gates had to leave the game with a right toe injury earlier in the game, and never returned.

With the win, not only did the Chargers improve their overall record to 12–5, but they also gave the franchise its very first playoff win since the 1994–95 AFC Championship Game which led them to Super Bowl XXIX. The team advanced to the AFC Divisional Playoff. Chargers go to the Divisional Round and win to the Colts 28-24. But lost in the AFC Championship Game to the Patriots 21-12.

==== AFC Divisional playoffs: at (2) Indianapolis Colts ====
AFC Divisional Playoffs: (3) San Diego Chargers at (2) Indianapolis Colts – Game summary

Quarter	1	2	3	4	Total
Chargers	0	7	14	7	28
Colts	7	3	7	7	24

at RCA Dome, Indianapolis, Indiana

- Date: January 13
- Game time: 1:06 p.m. EST
- Game weather: Game played indoors (Domed stadium)
- Game attendance: 56,950
- Referee: Gerald Austin
- TV announcers (CBS): Greg Gumbel (play-by-play), Dan Dierdorf (color commentator)
- Box score

Game information

First quarter

- IND – Dallas Clark 25-yard pass from Peyton Manning (Adam Vinatieri kick), 9:13. Colts 7–0. Drive: 9 plays, 76 yards, 5:47.
- SDG – Vincent Jackson 14-yard pass from Philip Rivers (Nate Kaeding kick), 8:38. Tied 7–7. Drive: 10 plays, 78 yards, 7:16.

Second quarter

- IND – Adam Vinatieri 46-yard field goal, 5:10. Colts 10–7. Drive: 8 plays, 44 yards, 3:28.

Third quarter

- SDG – Chris Chambers 30-yard pass from Philip Rivers (Nate Kaeding kick), 11:33. Chargers 14–10. Drive: 6 plays, 83 yards, 3:27.
- IND – Reggie Wayne 9-yard pass from Peyton Manning (Adam Vinatieri kick), 2:53. Colts 17–14. Drive: 5 plays, 50 yards, 3:02.
- SDG – Darren Sproles 56-yard pass from Philip Rivers (Nate Kaeding kick), 0:00. Chargers 21–17. Drive: 5 plays, 74 yards, 2:53.

Fourth quarter

- IND – Anthony Gonzalez 55-yard pass from Peyton Manning (Adam Vinatieri kick), 10:07. Colts 24–20. Drive: 3 plays, 56 yards, 0:43.
- SDG – Billy Volek 1-yard run (Nate Kaeding kick), 4:50. Chargers 28–24. Drive: 8 plays, 78 yards, 5:17.

Top passers

- SDG – Philip Rivers – 14/19, 264 yards, 3 TD, INT
- IND – Peyton Manning – 33/48, 402 yards, 3 TD, 2 INT

Top rushers

- SDG – Michael Turner – 17 rushes, 71 yards
- IND – Joseph Addai – 13 rushes, 43 yards

Top receivers

- SDG – Vincent Jackson – 7 receptions, 93 yards, TD
- IND – Dallas Clark – 6 receptions, 95 yards, TD

Coming off their wild card home win over the Titans, the Chargers flew to the RCA Dome for their AFC Divisional duel with the second-seeded/defending Super Bowl champion Indianapolis Colts, in a rematch of Week 10. In the first scoring play, Peyton Manning threw a TD to Dallas Clark for 25 yards. LaDainian Tomlinson was injured on a running play and despite an attempt to return to action later in the first half, he did not return to the game. Philip Rivers then threw a pass to Vincent Jackson for San Diego's first TD of the game. Adam Vinatieri made a 46-yard FG to put the Colts up 10–7. Antonio Cromartie intercepted Peyton Manning at the end of the first half and ran it 89 yards for a touchdown; however, the play was called back on a dubious holding call by Phil Luckett. The second half began with Rivers tossing a pass to Chris Chambers for 30 yards. At 3:19 of the third quarter, Manning completed a pass for Reggie Wayne for 9 yards. Rivers managed to complete a 56-yard pass to Darren Sproles for a touchdown. On that play, Rivers injured his leg and did not return to the game. Billy Volek replaced Rivers at quarterback. Starting the fourth quarter, Manning threw a TD pass to Anthony Gonzalez for 55 yards. Volek engineered a long drive culminating in a 1-yard sneak for a TD putting the Chargers up for good.

The Colts had two late opportunities to score on separate drives. On the first drive, the Colts faced a 4th down from inside the Charger 20-yard line. They decided against a field goal which still would have left them down by 1 point. Trying for the touchdown, Peyton Manning was hurried by a blitzing Shawne Merriman as his throw came up short. The Chargers took over on downs but failed to get a first down. After a long punt by Mike Scifres, the Colts had less than 2 minutes to try to win the game. Once again, the Chargers defense stifled the Colts, taking over on downs with seconds to play.

With the win, the team improved their overall record to 13–5. The team advanced to the AFC Championship Game. There were a total of 7 lead changes throughout the game. Chargers go to the AFC Championship Game but lost to the Patriots 21-12.

==== AFC Championship: at (1) New England Patriots ====
AFC championship game: (3) San Diego Chargers at (1) New England Patriots – Game summary

Quarter	1	2	3	4	Total
Chargers	3	6	3	0	12
Patriots	0	14	0	7	21

at Gillette Stadium, Foxborough, Massachusetts

- Date: January 20
- Game time: 3:05 p.m. EST
- Game weather: 22 °F or −5.6 °C (Partly Sunny, Cold)
- Game attendance: 68,756
- Referee: Jeff Triplette
- TV announcers (CBS): Jim Nantz (play by play) & Phil Simms (color commentator)
- Box score

Game information

First quarter

- SDG – Nate Kaeding 26-yard field goal, 2:55. Chargers 3–0. Drive: 7 plays, 32 yards, 2:12.

Second quarter

- NE – Laurence Maroney 1-yard run (Stephen Gostkowski kick), 13:48. Patriots 7–3. Drive: 10 plays, 65 yards, 4:07.
- SDG – Nate Kaeding 23-yard field goal, 9:14. Patriots 7–6. Drive: 9 plays, 65 yards, 4:34.
- NE – Jabar Gaffney 12-yard pass from Tom Brady (Stephen Gostkowski kick), 3:51. Patriots 14–6. Drive: 2 plays, 24 yards, 0:45.
- SDG – Nate Kaeding 40-yard field goal, 0:08. Patriots 14–9. Drive: 6 plays, 43 yards, 1:38.

Third quarter

- SDG – Nate Kaeding 24-yard field goal, 8:36. Patriots 14–12. Drive: 8 plays, 43 yards, 3:56.

Fourth quarter

- NE – Wes Welker 6-yard pass from Tom Brady (Stephen Gostkowski kick), 12:15. Patriots 21–12. Drive: 8 plays, 67 yards, 4:17.

Top passers

- SDG – Philip Rivers – 19/37, 211 yards, 2 INT
- NE – Tom Brady – 22/33, 209 yards, 2 TD, 3 INT

Top rushers

- SDG – Michael Turner – 17 rushes, 65 yards
- NE – Laurence Maroney – 25 rushes, 122 yards, TD

Top receivers

- SDG – Vincent Jackson – 6 receptions, 93 yards
- NE – Kevin Faulk – 8 receptions, 82 yards

After squeaking out their victory over Indianapolis, San Diego then traveled to Foxborough, Massachusetts to take on the New England Patriots in the AFC Championship Game in a rematch of Week 2. The Patriots were undefeated going into this game, at 17–0. Despite the Patriots being heavily favored to win by a large margin and advance to Super Bowl XLII, the game remained tight throughout, as the Chargers kept the score at 14–12 through the third quarter. Philip Rivers played through a torn ACL. LaDainian Tomlinson left early in the 1st quarter with another injury, never to return. Hampered by these key players' absences, the Chargers were unable to find the end zone the entire game. All twelve of their points were field goals.

== Awards ==
Nine Chargers were named to the 2008 Pro Bowl, and four were named first or second team Associated Press (AP) All-Pros. Also, Cromartie had 3 votes for AP NFL Defensive Rookie of the Year.

Player	Position	Pro Bowl starter	Pro Bowl reserve	Pro Bowl alternate	AP 1st team All-Pro	AP 2nd team All-Pro
Antonio Cromartie	Cornerback		Yes		Yes	
Kris Dielman	Guard		Yes			
Antonio Gates	Tight end	Yes				
Marcus McNeil	Tackle			Yes		
Shawne Merriman	Linebacker		Yes			Yes
Lorenzo Neal	Fullback	Yes			Yes	
Kassim Osgood	Special teams	Yes				
LaDainian Tomlinson	Running back	Yes			Yes	
Jamal Williams	Defensive tackle		Yes			
