= Tim Dobbins =

American football player (born 1982)

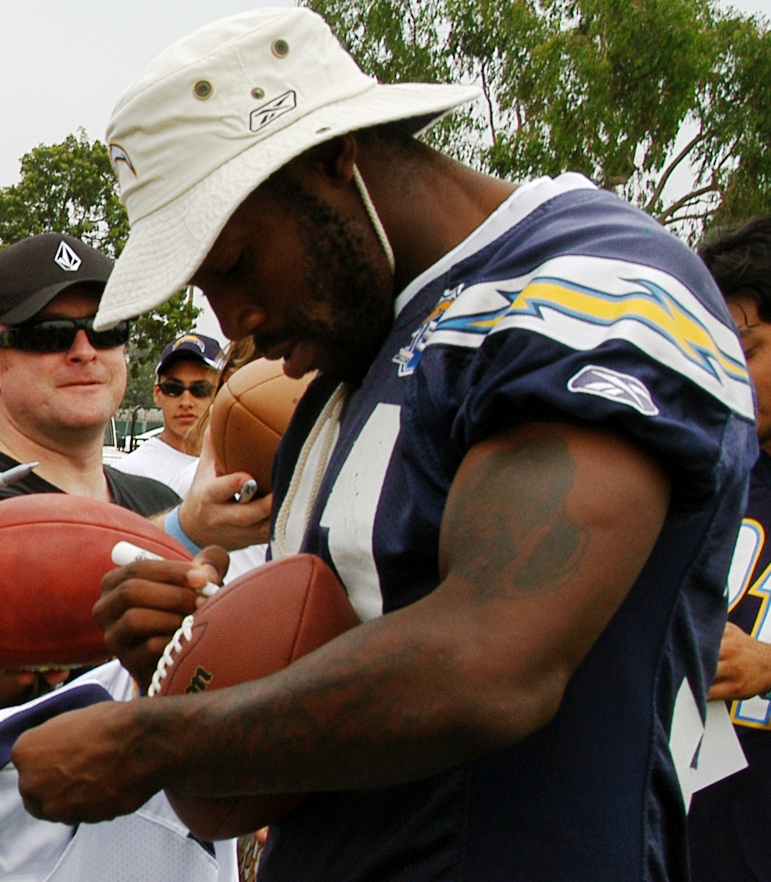
- Dobbins signing autographs in 2009

No. 51, 52
- Position: Linebacker

Personal information
- Born: December 10, 1982 (age 43); Nashville, Tennessee, U.S.
- Listed height: 6 ft 1 in (1.85 m)
- Listed weight: 234 lb (106 kg)

Career information
- High school: Glencliff (Nashville)
- College: Iowa State
- NFL draft: 2006: 5th round, 151st overall pick

Career history
- San Diego Chargers (2006–2009); Miami Dolphins (2010); Houston Texans (2011–2013); Atlanta Falcons (2014)*; Dallas Cowboys (2014)
- * Offseason or practice squad member only

Awards and highlights
- First-team All-Big 12 (2005); Big 12 Defensive Newcomer of the Year (2004)

Career NFL statistics
- Total tackles: 253
- Sacks: 2.0
- Forced fumbles: 6
- Pass deflections: 12
- Interceptions: 3
- Stats at Pro Football Reference

Timothy Lance Dobbins (born December 10, 1982) is a former professional American football player who was a linebacker in the National Football League (NFL). Dobbins played college football for the Iowa State Cyclones and was selected by the San Diego Chargers in the fifth round of the 2006 NFL draft.

== Early life ==
Dobbins attended Glencliff Comprehensive High School in Nashville, Tennessee, and led the Colts to the 1999 TSSAA Class 5A State Champion Runner-Up. He was also picked by the TSWA as a first team All State Linebacker in 2001 which was his senior year. Tim played at Glencliff with some of the most talented players to ever play at the school. During his career, he played with multiple other All State players that went on to have success at the college and professional levels. Those players include current Arena Football star CJ Johnson, who plays for the Georgia Force, former Buffalo Bills DB, Deon Giddens and former starting Tulsa DB CJ Scott.

== College career ==
He went to Copiah-Lincoln Community College in 2002–2003 and made all MACJC Teams both years. At Iowa State University where he played under coach Dan McCarney, Dobbins earned all Big 12 honors in his senior season. He led the Cyclones to the Independence Bowl in 2004 and to the Houston Bowl in 2005.

== Professional career ==
Pre-draft measurables
Height	Weight	Arm length	Hand span	40-yard dash	10-yard split	20-yard split	20-yard shuttle	Three-cone drill	Vertical jump	Broad jump	Bench press
6 ft 1 1/8 in (1.86 m)	246 lb (112 kg)	31 1/8 in (0.79 m)	9 3/8 in (0.24 m)	4.64 s	1.65 s	2.65 s	4.39 s	7.25 s	35.5 in (0.90 m)	9 ft 2 in (2.79 m)	23 reps
All values from NFL Combine

=== San Diego Chargers ===
Dobbins was selected 151st overall in the fifth round of the 2006 NFL draft by the Chargers. He entered the 2007 season as the first linebacker off the bench behind Stephen Cooper and Matt Wilhelm. In the 2007 NFL draft, A. J. Smith added some more competition to the linebacking corps with the additions of Anthony Waters and Brandon Siler.

=== Miami Dolphins ===
Dobbins was included in a trade during the first round of the 2010 NFL draft that sent him to the Miami Dolphins. After one season in Miami, he was released on August 1, 2011.

=== Houston Texans ===
On August 6, 2011, Dobbins signed with the Houston Texans.

During the divisional playoff game against the Baltimore Ravens, Dobbins stuffed Ray Rice on fourth-and-goal to preserve a goal-line stand. However, the Texans lost 20–13.

After starting linebacker Brian Cushing tore his ACL in week 5 of the 2012 season, Dobbins took his spot in the starting lineup.

In week 10 against the Chicago Bears, Dobbins illegally hit Bears quarterback Jay Cutler, giving him a concussion. On November 14, 2012, Dobbins was fined $30,000 for the illegal hit against Cutler.

Dobbins was released by the Texans on October 22, 2013.

=== Atlanta Falcons ===
Dobbins signed with the Atlanta Falcons on June 18, 2014. He was released after the Falcons claimed Nate Stupar off waivers.

=== Dallas Cowboys ===
Dobbins signed with the Dallas Cowboys after a season-ending injury to linebacker Justin Durant. He was released on November 11, 2014, to make room on the roster for Josh Brent.

=== Statistics ===
Regular season

Year	Team	G	GS	Tackles					Interceptions						Fumbles
Year	Team	G	GS	Solo	Ast	Comb	Sck	Sfty	PDef	Int	TD	Yds	Avg	Lng	FF
2006	SD	16	0	16	3	19	0	0	0	0	0	0	0.0	0	0
2007	SD	16	0	18	2	20	0	0	1	0	0	0	0.0	0	1
2008	SD	16	8	46	11	57	0	0	4	1	0	4	4.0	4	3
2009	SD	14	2	39	16	55	1	0	1	1	0	13	13.0	13	1
2010	MIA	16	6	36	11	47	1	0	1	0	0	0	0.0	0	0
2011	HOU	15	0	10	2	12	0	0	1	0	0	0	0.0	0	1
2012	HOU	14	6	30	13	43	0	0	4	1	0	7	7.0	7	0
2013	HOU	3	0	0	0	0	0	0	0	0	0	0	0.0	0	0
2014	DAL	0	0	0	0	0	0	0	0	0	0	0	0.0	0	0
Total		110	11	195	58	253	2	0	12	3	0	24	8.0	13	6
