= Quentin Jammer =

American football player (born 1979)

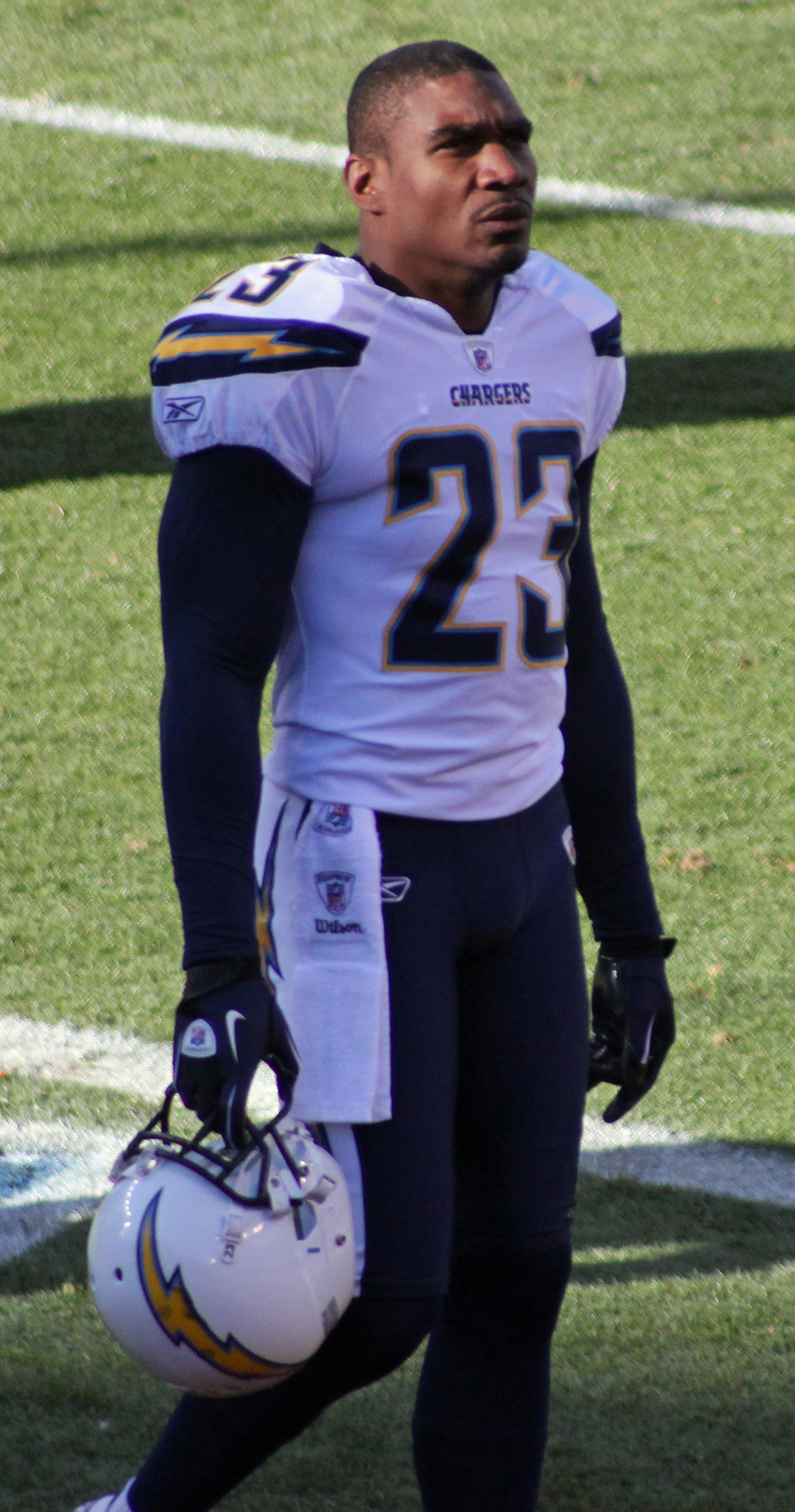
- Jammer with the San Diego Chargers in 2011

No. 23
- Position: Cornerback

Personal information
- Born: June 19, 1979 (age 47); Angleton, Texas, U.S.
- Listed height: 6 ft 0 in (1.83 m)
- Listed weight: 204 lb (93 kg)

Career information
- High school: Angleton
- College: Texas (1997–2001)
- NFL draft: 2002: 1st round, 5th overall pick

Career history
- San Diego Chargers (2002–2012); Denver Broncos (2013)

Awards and highlights
- PFWA All-Rookie Team (2002); San Diego Chargers 50th Anniversary Team; Unanimous All-American (2001); 2× First-team All-Big 12 (2000, 2001)

Career NFL statistics
- Total tackles: 733
- Forced fumbles: 7
- Pass deflections: 130
- Interceptions: 21
- Defensive touchdowns: 1
- Stats at Pro Football Reference

Quentin Tremaine Jammer (born June 19, 1979) is an American former professional football player who was a cornerback for 12 seasons in the National Football League (NFL), primarily with the San Diego Chargers. He played college football for the Texas Longhorns, earning unanimous All-American honors, and became a first-round draft pick of the Chargers in the 2002 NFL draft.

== Early life ==
Jammer was born in Bay City, Texas, and attended Angleton High School. In high school football, he was a two-time all-district safety, cornerback, linebacker, wide receiver, and quarterback, and was the district's defensive most valuable player as a senior. In 1997, he was selected for the state all-star football team, which included future San Diego Chargers teammates LaDainian Tomlinson and Drew Brees. He also won three letters in track and field, and participated in the long jump, 100-meter dash, and the 200-meter dash.

== College career ==
Jammer attended the University of Texas at Austin, and played for coach Mack Brown's Texas Longhorns football team from 1997 to 2001, though he sat out the 1999 season after suffering a shoulder injury in the first game. As a freshman, he played in every game and was a starter by the start of his sophomore year. He was a first-team All-Big 12 Conference selection following his junior and senior seasons, and was recognized as a unanimous first-team All-American as a senior in 2001. He was named team co-MVP his senior year and recorded seven interceptions as well as 195 tackles throughout his collegiate career. He set the school record for pass breakups with 57, and helped the team win the 1999 Cotton Bowl Classic and the 2001 Holiday Bowl.

== Professional career ==
Pre-draft measurables
Height	Weight	Arm length	Hand span	40-yard dash	Vertical jump	Broad jump	Bench press
5 ft 11 7/8 in (1.83 m)	204 lb (93 kg)	32 in (0.81 m)	9 1/2 in (0.24 m)	4.49 s	36 in (0.91 m)	10 ft 4 in (3.15 m)	18 reps
All values from NFL Combine

=== San Diego Chargers ===
Jammer was selected by the San Diego Chargers with the fifth overall pick in the first round of the 2002 NFL draft. Due to a holdout to start the 2002 season, he was not ready to make an impact his rookie year and started only four games. The following year, in 2003, Jammer started at the cornerback position. Coming into the NFL, Jammer was touted as being a physical player rather than a finesse cover cornerback. The transition to the NFL was difficult because the physical style of play that brought him so much success in college often resulted in pass interference calls. Jammer led the NFL in pass interference calls in 2004 with eight. Jammer suffered another setback in his development when the NFL made an officiating point of emphasis in 2004 that penalized defensive players for touching receivers further than five yards past the line of scrimmage. In an interview with Rick Gosselin of The Dallas Morning News, Jammer said, "All the rule changes for the offense have altered the game. It's turned football into track with pads. Before you know it, the receivers are going to have a free run at you. You can't touch them at all. The rules got me away from my game," Jammer said. "When physical corners start finessing it, that's not their style."

Jammer was criticized for his lack of interceptions, though he was still considered a valuable part of the team. In 62 career games leading up to the 2006 season, Jammer had only recorded six interceptions, including just two total in the 2004 and 2005 seasons. When the Chargers extended Jammer's contract during the 2006 offseason, Kevin Acee of the San Diego Union Tribune wrote that "he is widely considered by Chargers fans to be among the team's weak links, mostly for the fact he has just six career interceptions." Acee later wrote of Jammer: "In recent seasons Jammer has been without a doubt the most vilified Charger. It was difficult to tell whether he was disliked (perhaps too mild a term) more for what he did (get called for a lot of penalties) or what he didn't do (make interceptions). It's possible in the past decade there has been only one other Charger (do we really need to say his name?) who drew more wrath from the faithful."

During Jammer's first four years with the Chargers, the team regularly finished at or near the bottom of the league in terms of pass defense. Except for the 2003 season, the team was in the bottom five in terms of pass defense every year from 2002 to 2005. This led many Charger fans to become frustrated with Jammer, as due to his high draft position he became a symbol for the Chargers' failure to assemble a solid secondary. In turn, Jammer was often at odds with fans over their criticisms. In a September 2005 interview, Jammer said of the fans: "Those people are idiots. (They) don't know anything about football...They're not going to bother me." Many fans could often be heard chanting, "Lito, Lito" every time Jammer was beaten by a receiver, a reference to Lito Sheppard, the two-time Pro-Bowl cornerback of the Philadelphia Eagles who was taken after Jammer in the 2002 draft.

In his later years with the team, supporters of Jammer noted that the Chargers had a poor pass defense not because of Jammer, but because of their anemic pass rush. But in 2005, the Chargers had one of the top front 7s in the NFL, featuring Pro Bowler and NFL Defensive Rookie of the Year Award winner Shawne Merriman and Pro Bowler Jamal Williams. Despite this fearsome pass rush, the Chargers still finished 28th in the league in pass defense. A reason for this may be that the 3-4 defense, which the Chargers used under Ted Cottrell, typically has larger, slower players in the front seven than in the respective positions in the 4–3, leaving more pressure on the defensive backs.

During training camp Jammer signed a new five-year contract extension that ran through the 2012 season. The 2006 offseason saw an overhaul of the Chargers' secondary after many disappointing years. The team signed former Carolina Panthers safety Marlon McCree as a free agent, and they spent a first-round draft choice on cornerback Antonio Cromartie. McCree's veteran presence had an immediate impact on the secondary, including Jammer, who surpassed his 2005 interception total in only the third game of the season. Although Jammer only recorded one more interception in the remaining 13 games, the 2006 season was his best and most consistent as a pro. Towards the middle of the season, Jammer showed signs of turning into a shutdown cornerback, and QBs rarely threw at him. He closed out the Chargers 21–14 win over Oakland on November 26 with an interception on the first play after the two-minute warning. He finished the season leading the team in interceptions with 4 and with a career-high in tackles helping the Chargers finished 13th in the league in pass defense.

Jammer critics point to the 3rd and 10, long bomb Reche Caldwell caught in the divisional playoff game against the New England Patriots as a sign that Jammer was still not meeting expectations. Jammer, in blitz-scheme, short area press coverage, was not able to help the defense recover from an ineffective jailhouse blitz and Patriots' quarterback Tom Brady comfortably stepped up in the pocket to loft a deep strike to Caldwell. Despite Brady's completion to Caldwell, Jammer had a strong day limiting Patriot receivers, in the 2007 AFC Championship game against the Patriots, he had an outstanding performance, limiting Randy Moss to 1 reception for 12 yards, and intercepting Tom Brady once.

Jammer's numbers declined in 2011. In a June 2012 interview, Jammer admitted that he had a subpar season in 2011 in large part because he was distracted by his divorce. He said it caused him to drink too much and affected his confidence. In a December 2025 tweet, Jammer claimed that he played in "at least 8 games" while "completely shit faced drunk" in the 2011 season.

In week 6 of the 2012 season, Jammer recorded his first interception returned for a touchdown in his career on a pass from Denver Broncos quarterback Peyton Manning.

=== Denver Broncos ===
On May 29, 2013, Jammer signed with the Denver Broncos. The Broncos went to Super Bowl XLVIII that year, but Jammer was inactive for that game. The Broncos chose to keep Marquice Cole active instead as Jammer had "struggled down the stretch." Following the season, he became a free agent and, during the following training camp, Jammer returned to San Diego where he worked out on a full-time basis in the hopes of landing an NFL contract, but ultimately wasn't signed by anyone. His last NFL game was the AFC Championship win against New England.

== NFL career statistics ==
Year	Team	GP	Tackles			Fumbles		Interceptions					
Year	Team	GP	Cmb	Solo	Ast	FF	FR	Int	Yds	Avg	Lng	TD	PD
2002	SD	14	67	58	9	0	0	0	0	0	0	0	10
2003	SD	16	71	57	14	0	1	4	6	2	6	0	13
2004	SD	16	62	53	9	0	0	1	12	12	12	0	10
2005	SD	16	72	61	11	1	0	1	14	14	14	0	18
2006	SD	16	78	71	7	0	0	4	57	14	35	0	18
2007	SD	15	61	54	7	0	2	1	0	0	0	0	10
2008	SD	16	88	75	13	3	2	2	2	1	2	0	19
2009	SD	16	58	47	11	1	0	3	25	8	21	0	11
2010	SD	16	45	42	3	1	0	2	5	3	5	0	11
2011	SD	15	53	44	9	0	1	0	0	0	0	0	8
2012	SD	16	64	55	9	1	3	3	89	30	80	1	9
2013	DEN	11	14	13	1	0	1	0	0	0	0	0	3
Career		183	733	630	103	7	10	21	210	10	80	1	140

== Personal life ==
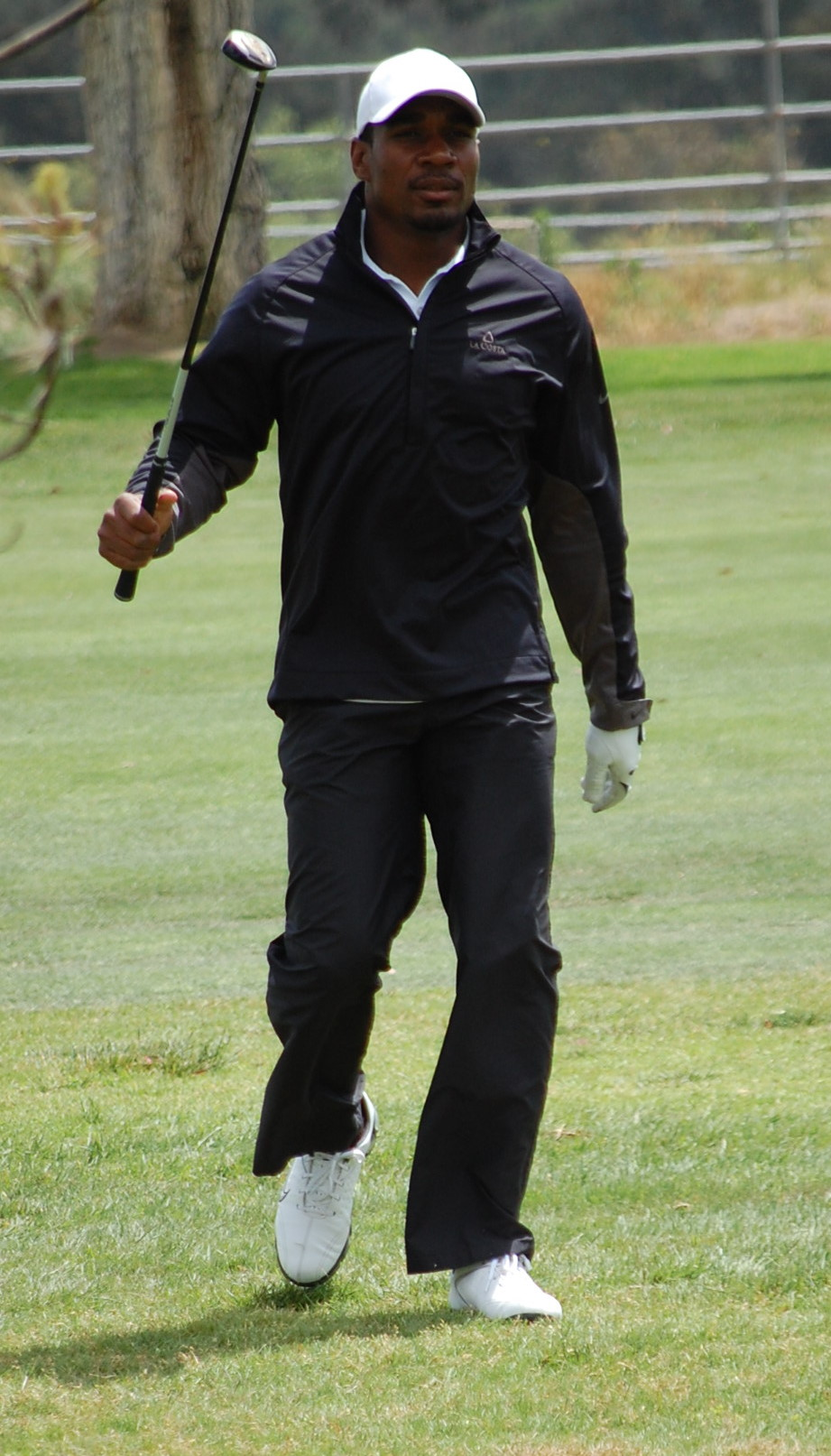
Jammer golfing

Jammer married his high school sweetheart, Alicia, shortly after she graduated high school in 2000. They had three sons and divorced in 2013.

His half-brother is NFL player Quandre Diggs. Jammer's cousin is NFL first overall draft pick Cam Ward.

Jammer made an appearance on an episode of E! True Hollywood Story in 2009. Jammer appeared as himself in Season 13, episode 20, which originally aired on November 18, 2009.

After his NFL career he began training jiu-jitsu. He made it to the quarterfinals of the World Master IBJJF Jiu-Jitsu Championship in 2018. He also started his own clothing company.

== See also ==
- List of Texas Longhorns football All-Americans
- List of Los Angeles Chargers first-round draft picks
