= Antonio Cromartie =

American football player (born 1984)

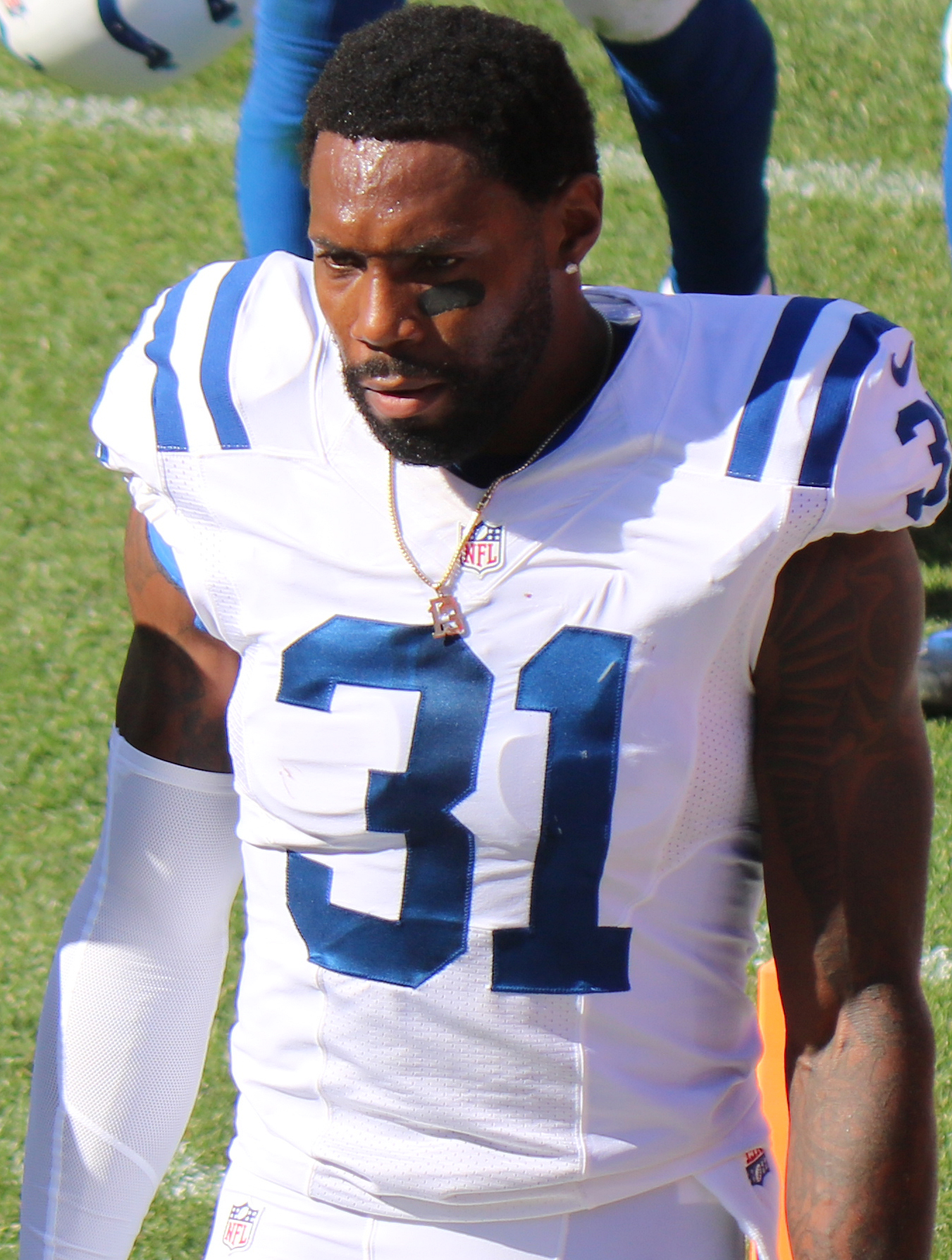
- Cromartie with the Indianapolis Colts in 2016

No. 25, 31
- Position: Cornerback

Personal information
- Born: April 15, 1984 (age 42); Tallahassee, Florida, U.S.
- Listed height: 6 ft 2 in (1.88 m)
- Listed weight: 210 lb (95 kg)

Career information
- High school: Lincoln (Tallahassee)
- College: Florida State (2003–2005)
- NFL draft: 2006: 1st round, 19th overall pick

Career history

Playing
- San Diego Chargers (2006–2009); New York Jets (2010–2013); Arizona Cardinals (2014); New York Jets (2015); Indianapolis Colts (2016)

Coaching
- Texas A&M (2021–2022) Defensive graduate assistant

Awards and highlights
- First-team All-Pro (2007); 4× Pro Bowl (2007, 2012–2014); NFL interceptions leader (2007); First-team All-ACC (2004); NFL record: 109-yard play (tied); NFL record 14 children fathered

Career NFL statistics
- Total tackles: 417
- Forced fumbles: 2
- Fumble recoveries: 5
- Pass deflections: 117
- Interceptions: 31
- Total touchdowns: 6
- Stats at Pro Football Reference

Antonio Cromartie Sr. (born April 15, 1984) is an American former professional football player who was a cornerback in the National Football League (NFL) for eleven seasons. He played college football for the Florida State Seminoles and was selected in the first round by the San Diego Chargers in the 2006 NFL draft. He was selected to four Pro Bowls and was a first-team All-Pro in 2007 after leading the league in interceptions. He also played for the Arizona Cardinals, New York Jets and Indianapolis Colts. Cromartie holds the record for the longest scoring play in NFL history after returning a missed field goal 109 yards for a touchdown in 2007. After his playing career, he was a graduate assistant for the Texas A&M Aggies.

== Early life ==
Cromartie was born in Tallahassee, Florida, He was a versatile player at Tallahassee's Lincoln High School. Throughout his senior season, Cromartie recorded 122 tackles and 2 interceptions, returned 3 punts and 2 kicks for TDs, had 450 yards and 1 touchdown on 30 catches and ran the ball 13 times for 242 yards and 3 touchdowns. This was enough to earn Cromartie 2002 USA Today defensive player of the year. Considered a four-star recruit by Rivals.com, Cromartie ranked sixth among cornerback prospects in the nation. Cromartie also participated in the 2003 U.S. Army All-American Bowl.

Cromartie also ran track in high school and placed 3rd in the 110-metres hurdles and as a member of the 4 x 100-metres relay team at the Class 5A County track meet. He also cleared 14.3 meters in triple jump.

== College career ==
Cromartie decided to stay close to home for college and accepted an athletic scholarship offer from Florida State University, where he played for coach Bobby Bowden's Florida State Seminoles football team from 2003 to 2004. After flashing playmaking potential as a nickelback and kick returner his first two years, Cromartie tore the anterior cruciate ligament in his left knee in July 2005 during voluntary workouts before his junior year and was forced to miss the entire 2005 season. He was potentially going to play at wide receiver during his junior year.

In addition to football, Cromartie also joined the Florida State Seminoles track team in 2004. He was a member of the FSU track team that won the ACC Championship in 2004, where he placed 10th in the 200 meters with a time of 21.35 seconds. He ran a career-best time of 46.39 seconds in the 400 meters at the NCAA Division I Championships, placing 6th in the prelims. He was timed at 21.27 seconds in the 200 meters.

== Professional career ==
=== Pre-draft ===
On March 16, 2006, Cromartie attended the NFL Scouting Combine, but performed limited drills as he was only 8 months removed from his torn ACL that required him undergoing surgery. His 4.47s in the 40–yard dash was slower then normally expected with his background in track and field who was known especially for his speed. He decided against performing the short-shuttle and three-cone drill, but performed well in the broad jump, tying Ohio State's Donte Whitner for the second best broad jump among defensive backs with 11'0" with his FSU teammate Pat Watkins finishing first with 11'1". Cromartie performed at his pro day in 2006 for scouts.

Pre-draft measurables
Height	Weight	Arm length	Hand span	40-yard dash	10-yard split	20-yard split	20-yard shuttle	Three-cone drill	Vertical jump	Broad jump	Bench press
6 ft 2 1/8 in (1.88 m)	208 lb (94 kg)	33 3/4 in (0.86 m)	10 1/2 in (0.27 m)	4.52 s	1.58 s	2.63 s	3.89 s	7.02 s	38 in (0.97 m)	11 ft 0 in (3.35 m)	18 reps
All values from NFL Combine/Pro Day

=== San Diego Chargers ===
==== 2006 ====
The San Diego Chargers selected Cromartie in the first round (19th overall) in the 2006 NFL draft, despite being removed from competitive football for an entire year. He was the second cornerback drafted in 2006, following the Denver Broncos selecting Tye Hill (15th overall). The Chargers entered the 2006 NFL Draft without any glaring needs that needed immediate attention and were able to have the ability to make what was described as a "luxury pick" in Cromartie after he fell to them at 19th overall only due to his injury causing him to not play for 15 months and a delayed transition to the professional game due to his recovery.

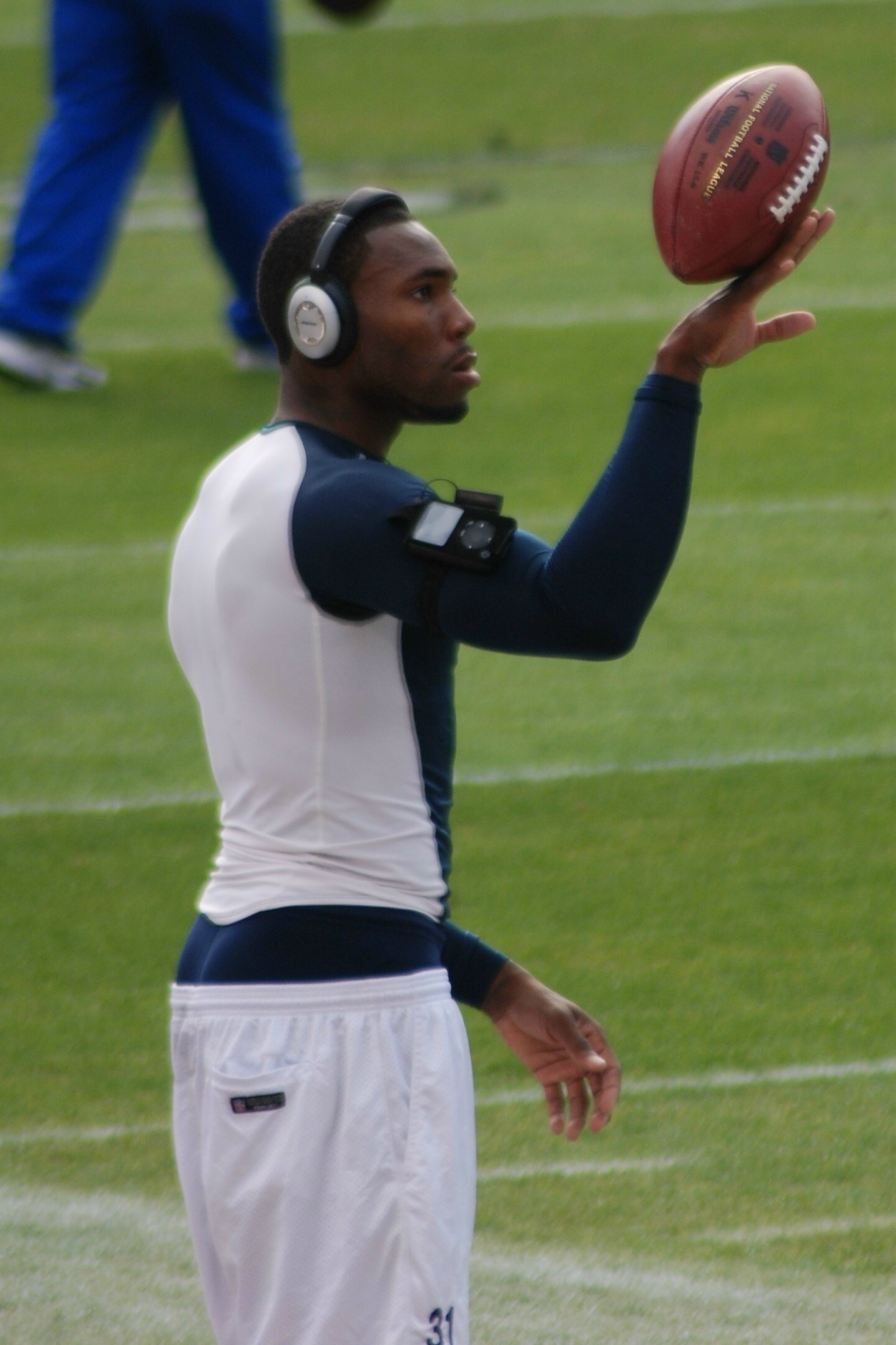
Cromartie with the Chargers in 2007

On July 25, 2006, the Chargers signed Cromartie to a five—year, $12.50 million rookie contract that included $7.35 million guaranteed.

He was expected to compete against Drayton Florence for the role as the No. 2 starting cornerback, but was unable to fully participate physically for the majority of training camp as he continued to recover from his torn ACL. Head coach Marty Schottenheimer named him the starting nickelback and the third cornerback on the depth chart to begin the season, behind starting cornerbacks Drayton Florence and Quentin Jammer.

On September 11, 2006, Cromartie made his professional regular season debut in the San Diego Chargers' season-opener at the Oakland Raiders as they won 27–0. On November 26, 2006, Cromartie had a 91–yard kick return for his best of the season and had three kick returns for a total of 130–yards as the Chargers defeated the Oakland Raiders 14–21. In Week 16, he set a season-high with four solo tackles as the Chargers won 20–17 at the Seattle Seahawks. He finished his rookie season with only 24 combined tackles (20 solo) and made five pass deflections while appearing in all 16 games without a start under defensive coordinator Wade Phillips. He also played special teams as a kick returner for six games and finished with ten kick returns for 297–yards.

==== 2007 ====
On February 12, 2007, the San Diego Chargers unexpectedly fired head coach Marty Schottenheimer although they finished in first place in the AFC West with a 14–2 record. Before the start of OTAs and spring camp, Cromartie elected to change his jersey number, switching from the No. 25 he wore throughout his entire rookie season to No. 31. Although No. 31 was available in 2006, he opted to wear No. 25 instead. Throughout training camp, he competed against Drayton Florence for the role as the No. 2 starting cornerback under new defensive coordinator Ted Cottrell. Head coach Norv Turner named him the starting nickelback and the third outside cornerback on the depth chart to begin the season, behind Drayton Florence and Quentin Jammer.

"I didn't know a lot about him, but as I started watching him I became aware that he was a real good athlete with good range, good hands and great speed. I thought, 'Man, we have the possibility of having a heck of a player, here.'"

— Ted Cottrell (Chargers' defensive coordinator)

In Week 6, Cromartie made three solo tackles, two pass deflections, and made the first interception of his career on a pass Daunte Culpepper threw to wide receiver Jerry Porter as the Chargers defeated the Oakland Raiders 14–28. On October 28, 2007, Cromartie made two solo tackles, three pass deflections, two interceptions, and two touchdowns during a 35–10 victory at the Houston Texans. During the first quarter, Cromartie appeared on special teams acting as a blocker on the punt return team and scored his first career touchdown when punter Matt Turk botched his punt attempt by mishandling the set up, leading to a loose ball in the end zone that was recovered for a touchdown by Cromartie. He then had the first pick-six of his career when he picked off a pass Matt Schaub threw to wide receiver Kevin Walter and returned it 70–yards to score his second touchdown of the game.

On November 4, 2007, Cromartie recorded two solo tackles and made NFL history during a 57–yard field goal attempt by Minnesota Vikings kicker Ryan Longwell with four seconds remaining at the end on the second quarter before halftime. Special teams coordinator Steve Crosby strategically positioned Cromartie under the goal post in order to field the kick in the opportunity of the field goal attempt falling short. As expected, the 57–yard field goal attempt by Longwell did fall short, but required Cromartie to leap fully extended in order to keep the ball from exiting the end zone. Cromartie successfully made an acrobatic catch while landing with both his feet in bounds. Starting nine yards deep at the back of the end zone, Cromartie took it up the right sideline and raced down the field, going untouched behind a few blocks as he returned the kick 100 yards for a touchdown to set the NFL record for the longest play in history with his entire kick return from the back of the end zone to the goal line being 109 yards in total, the maximum possible. The Chargers would lose 17–35 to the Minnesota Vikings at the Metrodome. Barring any rule changes, Cromartie's 109–yard kick return for a touchdown cannot be broken, only equaled, as 109 yards is theoretically the maximum possible due to regulation lengths set for the field and end zone. His performance earned him Special Teams Player of the Week.

Entering Week 10, head coach Norv Turner announced that Cromartie would make his first start in place of Quentin Jammer, who remained inactive for two games (Weeks 10–11) due to a hamstring injury. On November 11, 2007, Cromartie earned his first career start and recorded six solo tackles, set a season-high with four pass deflections, and set a career-high with three interceptions on passes thrown by Peyton Manning during a 21–23 win against the Indianapolis Colts. At the beginning of the second quarter, Cromartie made a highlight-reel one-handed interception, leaping in front of wide receiver Reggie Wayne to pick off Peyton Manning for the third time. Cromartie called the interception the best play of his short career. He is the first player to intercept Peyton Manning three times in one game during the regular season, and earned Defensive Player of the Week honors for his performance in the game. Entering Week 12, head coach Norv Turner demoted Drayton Florence and named Cromartie the No. 2 starting cornerback alongside Quentin Jammer for the last six games (Weeks 12–17) of the season. In Week 13, he made five solo tackles, two pass break-ups, and had two interceptions off passes by Tyler Thigpen during a 24–10 victory at the Kansas City Chiefs. On December 16, 2007, Cromartie made six solo tackles, one pass deflection, and set a career-high with his tenth interception of the season on a pass by Jon Kitna to wide receiver Shaun McDonald during a 51–14 win against the Detroit Lions. His tenth interception set a franchise record for most interceptions in a season, previously held by Charlie McNeil with nine interceptions in 1961. He finished the season with a total of 44 combined tackles (39 solo) in 16 games and eight starts. He set a career-highs in interceptions (10), pass deflections (18), fumble recoveries (2), and in total touchdowns (3). His breakout season in 2007 earned him an invitation to the 2008 Pro Bowl, marking the first Pro Bowl of his career and he was also selected as first-team All-Pro.

""He's a special player and a great athlete. He has the ability to be one of the top cover cornerbacks in this league for a long time."

— Peyton Manning (2009 Pro Bowl)

The San Diego Chargers finished in first place in the AFC West with an 11–5 record, earning a playoff berth. The Chargers defeated the Tennessee Titans 17–6 in the AFC Wild-Card Game. On January 13, 2008, Cromartie started in the AFC Divisional Round and made six solo tackles, one pass break-up, a forced fumble, and intercepted a pass by Peyton Manning to wide receiver Reggie Wayne during a 28–24 victory at the Indianapolis Colts. During the second quarter, wide receiver Marvin Harrison had a 17–yard reception before Cromartie forced a fumble by Harrison that was recovered by Chargers' safety Marlon McCree. On January 20, 2008, Cromartie started in the AFC Championship Game and led the team with nine combined tackles (seven solo), had one pass deflection, and intercepted a pass by Tom Brady to tight end Ben Watson as the Chargers lost 12–21 at the New England Patriots.

==== 2008 ====
He entered training camp as a starting cornerback following the departure of Drayton Florence. The San Diego Chargers selected Antoine Cason in the first round (27th overall) of the 2008 NFL draft to replace Drayton Florence. Head coach Norv Turner named Cromartie and Quentin Jammer the starting cornerbacks to begin the season with Antoine Cason at nickelback. On September 22, 2008, Cromartie had his best performance of the season, recording nine combined tackles (seven solo), set a season-high with four pass deflections, set a season-high with two interceptions, and returned one for a touchdown during a 48–29 victory against the New York Jets. He intercepted a pass by Brett Favre to wide receiver Laveranues Coles and returned it for a 52–yard touchdown in the second quarter. In Week 10, Cromartie set a season-high with 11 combined tackles (10 solo) and had one pass deflection during a 20–19 victory against the Kansas City Chiefs. On October 28, 2008, Chargers' head coach Norv Turner fired Ted Cottrell and subsequently promoted inside linebackers coach Ron Rivera. He finished with a career-high of 64 combined tackles (60 solo), nine pass deflections, two interceptions, and a touchdown in 16 games and 15 starts. At the conclusion of the season, Cromartie stated that he had fractured his hip during the Chargers' 24–21 loss against the Carolina Panthers and continued to play through the injury over the span of the entire season. Following his trade to the New York Jets in 2010, Cromartie claimed that his fractured hip in 2008 was initially hidden from him by team doctors that told Cromartie it was a hip flexor.

==== 2009 ====
He returned to training camp and was slated to be a starting cornerback, but had minor competition from Antoine Cason. Head coach Norv Turner retained Cromartie and Quentin Jammer as the starting cornerbacks to begin the season with Antoine Cason as the starting nickelback and primary backup cornerback. In Week 8, he made one solo tackle, a pass deflection, and had his first interception of the season during a pass attempt by JaMarcus Russell to tight end Zach Miller on the opening drive im their 16–24. On November 15, 2009, Cromartie made one solo tackle, had one pass break-up, and sealed the Chargers 31–23 win against the Philadelphia Eagles by intercepting a pass thrown by Donovan McNabb to wide receiver Jason Avant with two seconds remaining. He started in all 16 games throughout the 2009 NFL season and finished with a total of 33 combined tackles (31 solo), made ten pass deflections, and had three interceptions.

=== New York Jets (first stint) ===
==== 2010 ====
On March 4, 2010, the New York Jets traded the San Diego Chargers for Cromartie in exchange for a third-round pick in the 2011 NFL draft that was upgraded into a 2011 second-round pick (61st overall) due to performance options based on Cromartie's performance in 2010. He was signed to be their No. 2 starting cornerback following the departure of Lito Sheppard.

He entered training camp slated as the de facto No. 2 starting cornerback even with the Jets selecting Kyle Wilson in the first round (29th overall) of the 2010 NFL draft. No. 1 starting cornerback Darrelle Revis did not attend training camp and did not appear in any of the preseason games as he held out for a contract extension with one—year remaining. Head coach Rex Ryan named Cromartie and Darrelle Revis the starting cornerbacks to begin the season.

On September 13, 2010, Cromartie started in the New York Jets' home-opener against the Baltimore Ravens and made two solo tackles, one pass deflection, and intercepted a pass by Joe Flacco to wide receiver Anquan Boldin for 66–yards as they lost 10–9. In Week 3, he set a season-high with six combined tackles (five solo) and made one pass deflection during a 31–23 victory at the Miami Dolphins. In Week 5, Cromartie recorded one solo tackle and set a season-high with four pass deflections as the Jets defeated the Minnesota Vikings 29–20. Head coach Rex Ryan elected to rest starters, including Cromartie and Darrelle Revis in preparation for the playoffs and had them listed as healthy scratches as they routed the Buffalo Bills 38–7 in Week 17. He finished the 2010 NFL season with 42 combined tackles (41 solo), 18 pass deflections, and had three interceptions in 15 games and 15 starts. His kickoff return in the wild card round against the Indianapolis Colts helped to set up Nick Folk's game-winning field goal.

==== 2011 ====
On August 1, 2011, the New York Jets signed Cromartie to a four—year, $32.00 million contract extension that included $12.80 million guaranteed and an initial signing bonus of $5.00 million. He returned as the No. 2 starting cornerback to begin the season, alongside Darrelle Revis and nickelback Kyle Wilson.

On September 18, 2011, Cromartie made three combined tackles (two solo), two pass deflections, and set a season-high with two interceptions on passes thrown by Luke McCown as the Jets defeated the Jacksonville Jaguars 32–3. His performance earned him the AFC Defensive Player of the Week for his performance against the Jaguars in Week 2. In Week 3, Cromartie set a season-high with nine combined tackles (six solo), but also committed four errant penalties for 46–yards and also fumbled a kickoff return which resulted in a turnover that led to a Raiders go-ahead touchdown during their 24–34 loss at the Oakland Raiders. He left the game in the second half and was transported to Eden Medical Center where he was diagnosed with bruised ribs and a pulmonary contusion. He started in all 16 games throughout the 2011 NFL season and finished with 45 combined tackles (36 solo), 12 pass deflections, and made four interceptions.

==== 2012 ====
He returned as the No. 2 starting cornerback to begin the season, alongside Darrell Revis. On September 9, 2012, Cromartie started in the New York Jets' home-opener against the Buffalo Bills and made four combined tackles (two solo), one pass deflection, and had a pick-six when he intercepted a pass by Ryan Fitzpatrick to wide receiver David Nelson and returned it 40–yards for a touchdown during their 48–28 victory. On October 12, 2012, the Jets placed Darrell Revis on injured reserve after he tore his ACL in Week 3 during a 23–20 overtime victory at the Miami Dolphins. Head coach Rex Ryan subsequently named Cromartie the No. 1 starting cornerback for the rest of the season, alongside Kyle Wilson. On October 14, 2012, Cromartie made four combined tackles (three solo), set a season-high with two pass deflections, and intercepted a pass by Andrew Luck to wide receiver Reggie Wayne during a 35–9 victory against the Indianapolis Colts. He started in all 16 games throughout the 2012 NFL season and finished with a total of 35 combined tackles (30 solo), made 13 pass deflections, and had three interceptions. He was named to the 2013 Pro Bowl, marking the second of his career.

==== 2013 ====
The New York Jets made multiple changes following the 2012 NFL season, including the departure of Darrelle Revis and defensive coordinator Mike Pettine after he accepted the head coach position with the Cleveland Browns. Defensive backs coach Dennis Thurman received a promotion to defensive coordinator and the Jets went on to select Dee Millner with the ninth overall pick in the 2013 NFL draft. Head coach Rex Ryan named Cromartie the No. 1 starting cornerback to begin the season and paired him with Dee Millner.

On November 3, 2013, Cromartie made one solo tackle, a pass deflection, and intercepted a pass by Drew Brees to wide receiver Nick Toon as the Jets defeated the New Orleans Saints 26–20. In Week 11, he set a season-high with five solo tackles and made two pass deflections during a 14–37 loss at the Buffalo Bills. The following week, he recorded two solo tackles, set a season-high with two pass deflections, and intercepted a pass by Joe Flacco to wide receiver Marlon Brown during a 3–19 loss at the Baltimore Ravens in Week 12. He finished the 2013 NFL season with 38 combined tackles (35 solo), made nine pass deflections, and three interceptions. He was selected as an alternate to the 2014 Pro Bowl, for the third selection of his career.

On March 9, 2014, the New York Jets released Cromartie.

=== Arizona Cardinals ===
On March 19, 2014, the Arizona Cardinals signed Cromartie to a one—year, $3.50 million contract that included $3.25 million guaranteed and a signing bonus of $1 million. He entered training camp slated as the No. 2 starting cornerback under defensive coordinator Todd Bowles. Head coach Bruce Arians named him a starting cornerback to begin the season, alongside Patrick Peterson and nickelback Jerraud Powers.

On October 26, 2014, Cromartie recorded five solo tackles, set a season-high with three pass deflections, and also set a season-high with two interceptions off passes by Nick Foles during a 24–20 victory against the Philadelphia Eagles. The following game, Cromartie made three solo tackles, one pass deflection, and helped secure a 28–17 victory at the Dallas Cowboys in Week 9 by intercepting a pass thrown by Brandon Weeden to wide receiver Terrance Williams with 5:34 remaining in the fourth quarter. On November 9, 2014, Cromartie recorded one solo tackle and returned a fumble recovery caused during a strip/sack by defensive tackle Kareem Martin on quarterback Austin Davis as the Cardinals defeated the St. Louis Rams 14–31. He started in all 16 games throughout the 2014 NFL season and made 49 combined tackles (43 solo), ten pass deflections, three interceptions, and scored one touchdown. He was selected for the 2015 Pro Bowl.

=== New York Jets (second stint) ===
On March 12, 2015, the New York Jets signed Cromartie to a four—year, $32 million contract that included $7 million guaranteed. He was reunited with Jets' head coach Todd Bowles who was his defensive coordinator the previous season with the Arizona Cardinals. He began the season as a starting cornerback alongside Darrelle Revis. On October 25, 2015, Cromartie set a season-high with five solo tackles and made one pass deflection during a 23–30 loss at the New England Patriots. In Week 14, he recorded one solo tackle and set a season-high with three pass deflections as the Jets routed the Tennessee Titans 30–8. He finished the 2015 NFL season with 29 combined tackles (26 solo) and made 12 pass deflections in 15 games and 15 starts.

On February 22, 2016, the Jets released Cromartie after just one season.

=== Indianapolis Colts ===
On August 22, 2016, the Indianapolis Colts signed Cromartie to a one—year, $3 million contract that includes a signing bonus of $250,000.

On October 4, 2016, after just four games with the team, Cromartie was released.

=== Retirement ===
On March 5, 2018, after spending the entire 2017 season out of football, he announced his retirement from football.

== NFL career statistics ==
Legend
**Bold**	Career high

Year	Team	Games		Tackles				Fumbles			Interceptions					
Year	Team	GP	GS	Comb	Solo	Ast	Sck	FF	FR	Yds	Int	Yds	Avg	Lng	TD	PD
2006	SD	16	0	24	20	4	0.0	0	0	0	0	0	0	0	0	4
2007	SD	16	8	44	39	5	0.0	0	**2**	0	**10**	**144**	14	**70**	**1**	**18**
2008	SD	16	15	**64**	**60**	4	0.0	0	0	0	2	66	**33**	52	**1**	9
2009	SD	16	16	33	31	2	0.0	0	0	0	3	17	6	16	0	10
2010	NYJ	15	15	42	41	1	0.0	0	1	0	3	75	25	66	0	17
2011	NYJ	16	16	45	36	**9**	0.0	**1**	0	0	4	105	26	42	0	12
2012	NYJ	16	16	35	30	5	0.0	0	0	0	3	53	18	40	**1**	13
2013	NYJ	16	16	38	35	3	0.0	**1**	0	0	3	20	7	20	0	9
2014	ARI	16	16	48	43	5	0.0	0	1	**14**	3	65	22	40	0	10
2015	NYJ	15	15	29	26	3	0.0	0	0	0	0	0	0	0	0	12
2016	IND	4	4	14	14	0	0.0	0	0	0	0	0	0	0	0	2
Career		162	137	417	376	41	0.0	2	4	14	31	545	18	70	3	116

== Coaching career ==
In 2018, Cromartie worked as an intern for the New York Jets under Todd Bowles. In 2021, he announced that he would be a graduate assistant at Texas A&M under Jimbo Fisher. In October 2023, Cromartie was hired as a defensive analyst for the Saint Augustine University's football team.

== Personal life ==
He is a cousin of former NFL cornerback Dominique Rodgers-Cromartie and Marcus Cromartie, a former cornerback for the Montreal Alouettes of the Canadian Football League. He is of Haitian descent.

Cromartie married Terricka Cason, who starred on E!'s Candy Girls, on July 2, 2008. Cason gave birth to six children, daughter Jordynn Trinity, daughter Jurzie Blu, son Jagger Beau-Antonio, twins, son Jynx Revell-Antonio and daughter J’adore Nayvi and daughter Jhett Paxton. Cromartie has 14 known children.

In 2016, he knelt in protest of police brutality, racial oppression and social injustice during the playing of the national anthem. Cromartie has stated his belief that this was why he was released by the Colts.
