= Jyles Tucker =

American football player (born 1983)

No. 94
- Position: Linebacker

Personal information
- Born: September 18, 1983 (age 43); Dover, New Jersey, U.S.
- Listed height: 6 ft 3 in (1.91 m)
- Listed weight: 258 lb (117 kg)

Career information
- High school: Morristown-Beard (Morristown, New Jersey)
- College: Wake Forest
- NFL draft: 2007: undrafted

Career history
- San Diego Chargers (2007–2010); Carolina Panthers (2012)*
- * Offseason or practice squad member only

Career NFL statistics
- Total tackles: 56
- Sacks: 10.0
- Forced fumbles: 2
- Fumble recoveries: 2
- Defensive touchdowns: 1
- Stats at Pro Football Reference

Jyles Christopher Tucker (born September 18, 1983) is an American former professional football player who was a linebacker in the National Football League (NFL). He played college football for the Wake Forest Demon Deacons and was signed by the San Diego Chargers as an undrafted free agent in 2007. Tucker was also a member of the Carolina Panthers.

== Early life ==
His hometown is Dover, New Jersey, but Tucker played high school football at Morristown-Beard School, and a post-graduate season at Hargrave Military Academy.

== Professional career ==
Tucker was one of five nominees for the Diet Pepsi NFL Rookie of the Week award in Week 17. He recorded three tackles, three sacks and two forced fumbles and a touchdown in the Chargers' 30–17 win over the Oakland Raiders.

Tucker was awarded the Week 17 AFC Defensive player of the week for his performance against the Oakland Raiders.

On August 25, 2008, it was announced that the Chargers re-signed Tucker for 5 years at a reported $14 million.

On July 28, 2011, he was released by San Diego.
