= Anthony Waters =

American football player (born 1984)

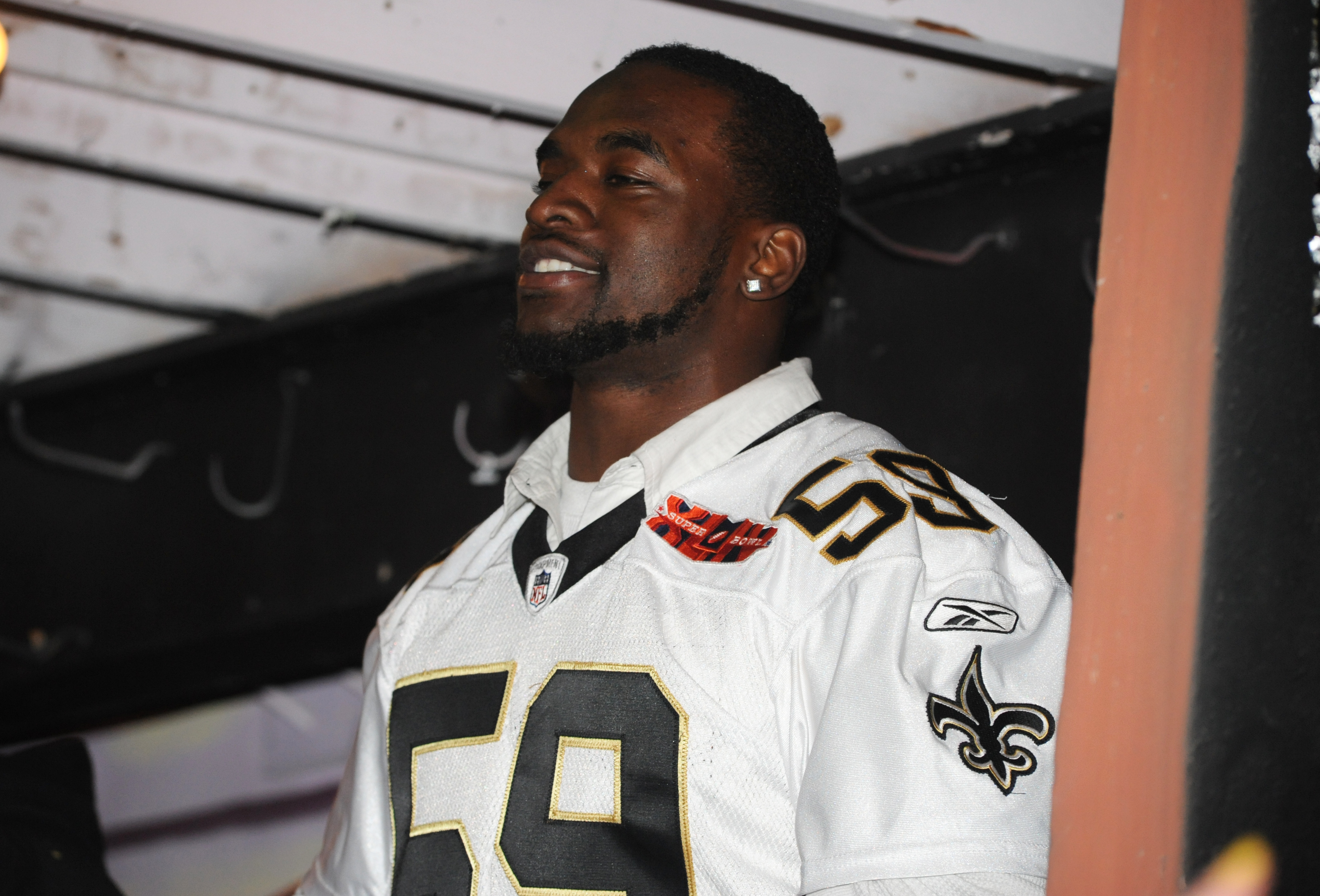
- Waters at the 2010 Saints Super Bowl victory parade

No. 53, 59
- Position: Linebacker

Personal information
- Born: July 25, 1984 (age 42); Dillon, South Carolina, U.S.
- Listed height: 6 ft 3 in (1.91 m)
- Listed weight: 238 lb (108 kg)

Career information
- High school: Lake View (Dillon, South Carolina)
- College: Clemson
- NFL draft: 2007: 3rd round, 96th overall pick

Career history
- San Diego Chargers (2007–2008); New Orleans Saints (2009)*; Buffalo Bills (2009)*; New Orleans Saints (2009–2010)
- * Offseason or practice squad member only

Awards and highlights
- Super Bowl champion (XLIV)

Career NFL statistics
- Total tackles: 14
- Fumble recoveries: 1
- Stats at Pro Football Reference

Anthony Devonne Waters (born July 25, 1985) is an American former professional football player who was a linebacker in the National Football League (NFL). He was selected by the San Diego Chargers in the third round of the 2007 NFL draft. He played college football for the Clemson Tigers. He is also the older brother of linebacker Shaquille Leonard.

== College career ==
Waters attended Clemson University for college. Waters' senior season ended early as he tore his ACL in his left knee on September 3, 2006 in the opening game of the season against Florida Atlantic.

== Professional career ==
Pre-draft measurables
Height	Weight	Arm length	Hand span	40-yard dash	Vertical jump	Broad jump	Bench press
6 ft 3 in (1.91 m)	245 lb (111 kg)	33 in (0.84 m)	9 5/8 in (0.24 m)	4.62 s	1 in (0.03 m)	9 ft 7 in (2.92 m)	25 reps
Bench press from NFL Scouting Combine; all other values from Pro Day; see scouting report at the Wayback Machine (archived May 22, 2007)

=== San Diego Chargers ===
Waters was selected by the San Diego Chargers in the third round (95th overall) of the 2007 NFL draft. After missing his entire rookie season in 2007, Waters appeared in seven games for the Chargers in 2008 and recorded three tackles. He was waived by the team on February 26, 2009.

=== New Orleans Saints (first stint) ===
Waters signed with the New Orleans Saints on April 15, 2009. He was part of the Saints' final cuts in early September.

=== Buffalo Bills ===
Waters signed as a practice squad member of the Buffalo Bills on October 14, 2009.

=== New Orleans Saints (second stint) ===
After spending eight weeks on the Bills' practice squad, Waters returned to the Saints when they signed him to their active roster on December 9, 2009. He was not re-signed following the 2010 season and became a free agent.

=== NFL statistics ===
Year	Team	Games	Combined tackles	Tackles	Assisted tackles	Sacks	Forced fumbles	Fumble recoveries	Fumbler Return Yards	Interceptions	Interception return yards	Yards per interception return	Longest interception return	Interceptions returned for touchdown	Passes defended
2008	SD	7	3	3	0	0.0	0	1	0	0	0	0	0	0	0
2009	NO	3	2	2	0	0.0	0	0	0	0	0	0	0	0	0
2010	NO	10	9	8	1	0.0	0	0	0	0	0	0	0	0	0
Career		20	14	13	1	0.0	0	1	0	0	0	0	0	0	0

== Coaching career ==
In 2014, Waters coached football at Grier Middle School in Gastonia, North Carolina.
