= 2004 San Diego Chargers season =

NFL team 45th season

- Owner: Alex Spanos
- General manager: A.J. Smith
- Head coach: Marty Schottenheimer
- Home stadium: Qualcomm Stadium

Results
- Record: 12–4
- Division place: 1st AFC West
- Playoffs: Lost Wild Card Playoffs (vs. Jets) 17–20 (OT)
- All-Pros: 4: LB Donnie Edwards (2nd team); TE Antonio Gates (1st team); RB LaDainian Tomlinson (1st team); NT Jamal Williams (2nd team)
- Pro Bowlers: 3: QB Drew Brees; TE Antonio Gates; RB LaDainian Tomlinson

The 2004 San Diego Chargers season was the franchise's 35th season in the National Football League (NFL), its 45th overall and the third under head coach Marty Schottenheimer. It was the franchise's first season involving quarterback Philip Rivers. The team improved on their 4–12 record in 2003 and finished the regular season 12–4, made the playoffs for the first time in nine years, and captured their first division title since the 1994 season. In the playoffs they lost in overtime to the New York Jets. At the end of the season Marty Schottenheimer was named NFL Coach of the Year.

== Offseason ==
Additions	Subtractions
WR Keenan McCardell (Buccaneers)	DE Raylee Johnson (Broncos)
OT Roman Oben (Buccaneers)	C Cory Raymer (Redskins)
ILB Randall Godfrey (Seahawks)	G Kelvin Garmon (Browns)
	WR David Boston (Dolphins)

=== NFL draft ===
Entering the draft, the consensus top pick was Ole Miss quarterback Eli Manning. However, Manning had said prior to the draft that he did not want to play for the Chargers and would not sign with them if he was drafted. The Chargers struck a deal with the Giants before the draft that would shape the future of both franchises: the Chargers would select Manning first overall, as they had intended to, and the Giants would draft quarterback Philip Rivers of North Carolina State and then swap him and two 2005 draft picks for Manning.

2004 San Diego Chargers draft
Round	Pick	Player	Position	College	Notes
1	1	Eli Manning *	QB	Ole Miss	traded to NY Giants
2	35	Igor Olshansky	DT	Oregon	
3	65	Nate Kaeding *	K	Iowa	From NY Giants
3	66	Nick Hardwick *	C	Purdue	
4	98	Shaun Phillips *	DE	Purdue	
5	133	Dave Ball	DE	UCLA	
5	154	Michael Turner *	RB	NIU	from Miami
6	169	Ryan Krause	TE	Nebraska-Omaha	
7	204	Ryon Bingham	DT	Nebraska	
7	209	Shane Olivea	OT	Ohio State	from Atlanta
7	254	Carlos Joseph	OT	Miami (FL)	
Made roster † Pro Football Hall of Fame * Made at least one Pro Bowl during career

== Personnel ==
=== Staff ===
2004 San Diego Chargers staff
Front office: Owner – Alex Spanos; President/chief executive officer – Dean Spanos; Executive vice president – Michael Spanos; Executive vice president/general manager – A. J. Smith; Assistant general manager/director of player personnel – Buddy Nix; Vice president of football operations – Ed McGuire; Director of college scouting – Jimmy Raye; Director of pro scouting – Fran Foley; Head coaches: Head coach – Marty Schottenheimer; Assistant head coach – Tim Brewster; Offensive coaches: Offensive coordinator – Cam Cameron; Quarterbacks – Brian Schottenheimer; Running backs – Clarence Shelmon; Wide receivers – James Lofton; Tight ends – Tim Brewster; Offensive line – Hudson Houck; Offensive assistant/quality control – Pete Carmichael, Jr.	Defensive coaches: Defensive coordinator – Wade Phillips; Defensive line – Wayne Nunnely; Linebackers – Greg Manusky; Secondary – Brian Stewart; Defensive assistant/quality control – John Pagano; Special teams coaches: Special teams – Steve Crosby; Strength and conditioning: Strength and conditioning – Dave Redding; Assistant strength and conditioning – Matt Schiotz

=== Roster ===
2004 San Diego Chargers roster
Quarterbacks (QB): 9 Drew Brees; 7 Doug Flutie; 12 Cleo Lemon; 17 Philip Rivers; Running backs (RB): 24 Jesse Chatman; 41 Lorenzo Neal FB; 34 Andrew Pinnock FB; 21 LaDainian Tomlinson; 33 Michael Turner; Wide receivers (WR): 87 Tim Dwight; 13 Malcom Floyd; 86 Keenan McCardell; 88 Eric Parker; 81 Kassim Osgood; 83 Bobby Shaw; Tight ends (TE): 85 Antonio Gates; 89 Ryan Krause; 84 Justin Peelle	Offensive linemen (OL): 65 David Brandt C; 68 Kris Dielman G; 77 Toniu Fonoti G; 79 Mike Goff G; 62 Bob Hallen C; 61 Nick Hardwick C; 75 Leander Jordan OT; 72 Roman Oben OT; 70 Shane Olivea OT; Defensive linemen (DL): 74 Jacques Cesaire DE; 90 Adrian Dingle DE; 92 Jason Fisk NT; 99 Igor Olshansky DE; 94 Robert Pollard DE; 78 DeQuincy Scott DE; 76 Jamal Williams NT	Linebackers (LB): 54 Stephen Cooper ILB; 59 Donnie Edwards ILB; 53 Steve Foley OLB; 58 Randall Godfrey ILB; 51 Ben Leber OLB; 95 Shaun Phillips OLB; 56 Matt Wilhelm ILB; Defensive backs (DB): 45 Robb Butler CB; 22 Sammy Davis CB; 25 Jamar Fletcher CB; 29 Drayton Florence CB; 42 Clinton Hart SS; 23 Quentin Jammer CB; 48 Terrence Kiel SS; 31 Hanik Milligan FS; 20 Jerry Wilson FS; Special teams (ST): 50 David Binn LS; 10 Nate Kaeding K; 5 Mike Scifres P	Practice squad: 26 Jonathan Cox CB; -- Brock Edwards TE (IR); 30 Ahmaad Galloway RB; -- Howard Hodges LB; 73 Carlos Joseph OT; 18 Carl Morris WR; 43 Cal Murray RB; 80 Willie Quinnie WR; Reserve: 96 Dave Ball DE (IR); 91 Ryon Bingham NT (IR); 82 Reche Caldwell WR (IR); 93 Eric Downing NT (IR); 35 Leon Johnson RB (PUP); 57 Zeke Moreno OLB (IR); 52 Carlos Polk OLB (IR); 71 Courtney Van Buren OT (IR); Rookies in italics 53 active, 9 reserve, 7 practice squad

== Preseason ==
Week	Date	Opponent	Result	Record	Venue	Attendance
1	August 14	Indianapolis Colts	L 17–21	0–1	Qualcomm Stadium	
2	August 21	at Arizona Cardinals	W 38–13	1–1	Cardinals Stadium	
3	August 27	Seattle Seahawks	L 20–26	1–2	Qualcomm Stadium	
4	September 2	at San Francisco 49ers	W 31–15	2–2	Monster Park	

== Regular season ==
=== Schedule ===
Week	Date	Opponent	Result	Record	Venue	Recap
1	September 12	at Houston Texans	**W** 27–20	1–0	Reliant Stadium	Recap
2	September 19	New York Jets	**L** 28–34	1–1	Qualcomm Stadium	Recap
3	September 26	at **Denver Broncos**	**L** 13–23	1–2	Invesco Field at Mile High	Recap
4	October 3	Tennessee Titans	**W** 38–17	2–2	Qualcomm Stadium	Recap
5	October 10	Jacksonville Jaguars	**W** 34–21	3–2	Qualcomm Stadium	Recap
6	October 17	at Atlanta Falcons	**L** 20–21	3–3	Georgia Dome	Recap
7	October 24	at Carolina Panthers	**W** 17–6	4–3	Bank of America Stadium	Recap
8	October 31	**Oakland Raiders**	**W** 42–14	5–3	Qualcomm Stadium	Recap
9	November 7	New Orleans Saints	**W** 43–17	6–3	Qualcomm Stadium	Recap
10	Bye					
11	November 21	at **Oakland Raiders**	**W** 23–17	7–3	McAfee Coliseum	Recap
12	November 28	at **Kansas City Chiefs**	**W** 34–31	8–3	Arrowhead Stadium	Recap
13	December 5	**Denver Broncos**	**W** 20–17	9–3	Qualcomm Stadium	Recap
14	December 12	Tampa Bay Buccaneers	**W** 31–24	10–3	Qualcomm Stadium	Recap
15	December 19	at Cleveland Browns	**W** 21–0	11–3	Cleveland Browns Stadium	Recap
16	December 26	at Indianapolis Colts	**L** 31–34 (OT)	11–4	RCA Dome	Recap
17	January 2, 2005	**Kansas City Chiefs**	**W** 24–17	12–4	Qualcomm Stadium	Recap
Note: Intra-division opponents are in **bold** text.

=== Game summaries ===
==== Week 1: at Houston Texans ====
Week 1: San Diego Chargers at Houston Texans

Quarter	1	2	3	4	Total
**Chargers**	3	7	10	7	**27**
Texans	3	10	7	0	**20**

at Reliant Stadium, Houston, Texas

- Date: September 12
- Game time: 12:05 p.m. CDT
- Game weather: N/A (retractable roof closed)
- Game attendance: 70,255
- Referee: Bill Leavy
- TV announcers (CBS): Gus Johnson and Brent Jones
- Box score

Game information

**First quarter**

- HOU – Kris Brown 37-yard field goal, 11:49. Texans 3–0. **Drive: 8 plays, 58 yards, 3:11.**
- SDG – Nate Kaeding 48-yard field goal, 6:35. Tied 3–3. **Drive: 9 plays, 48 yards, 5:14.**

**Second quarter**

- HOU – Kris Brown 20-yard field goal, 14:07. Texans 6–3. **Drive: 13 plays, 71 yards, 7:28.**
- SDG – LaDainian Tomlinson 1-yard run (Nate Kaeding kick), 9:51. Chargers 10–6. **Drive: 5 plays, 45 yards, 2:22.**
- HOU – Dominick Davis 2-yard run (Kris Brown kick), 4:43. Texans 13–10. **Drive: 9 plays, 71 yards, 5:08.**

**Third quarter**

- SDG – Reche Caldwell 36-yard pass from Drew Brees (Nate Kaeding kick), 9:12. Chargers 17–13. **Drive: 4 plays, 49 yards, 2:15.**
- HOU – Dominick Davis 1-yard run (Kris Brown kick), 4:36. Texans 20–17. **Drive: 8 plays, 52 yards, 4:36.**
- SDG – Nate Kaeding 29-yard field goal, 0:00. Tied 20–20. **Drive: 9 plays, 59 yards, 4:36.**

**Fourth quarter**

- SDG – Eric Parker 19-yard pass from Drew Brees (Nate Kaeding kick), 8:34. Chargers 27–20. **Drive: 7 plays, 59 yards, 4:13.**

**Top passers**

- SDG – Drew Brees – 17/24, 209 yards, 2 TD
- HOU – David Carr – 19/25, 229 yards, 2 INT

**Top rushers**

- SDG – LaDainian Tomlinson – 26 rushes, 121 yards, TD
- HOU – Domanick Williams – 21 rushes, 87 yards, 2 TD

**Top receivers**

- SDG – Antonio Gates – 8 receptions, 123 yards
- HOU – Domanick Williams – 5 receptions, 70 yards

==== Week 2: vs. New York Jets ====
Week 2: New York Jets at San Diego Chargers

Quarter	1	2	3	4	Total
**Jets**	14	3	10	7	**34**
Chargers	0	7	7	14	**28**

at Qualcomm Stadium, San Diego, California

- Date: September 19
- Game time: 1:15 p.m. PDT
- Game weather: 73 °F (22.8 °C), humidity 67 percent, wind 9 miles per hour (14 km/h; 7.8 kn)
- Game attendance: 57,310
- Referee: Peter Morelli
- TV announcers (CBS (Blacked out locally)): Ian Eagle, Solomon Wilcots and Scott Kaplan
- Box score

Game information

**First quarter**

- NYJ – Curtis Martin 1-yard run (Doug Brien kick), 7:50. Jets 7–0. **Drive: 7 plays, 80 yards, 3:08.**
- NYJ – Curtis Martin 2-yard run (Doug Brien kick), 3:42. Jets 14–0. **Drive: 6 plays, 44 yards, 3:16.**

**Second quarter**

- NYJ – Doug Brien 28-yard field goal, 9:40. Jets 17–0. **Drive: 6 plays, 22 yards, 2:55.**
- SDG – Tim Dwight 87-yard kickoff return (Nate Kaeding kick), 9:28. Jets 17–7. **Drive: 0 plays, 0 yards, 0:12.**

**Third quarter**

- NYJ – Doug Brien 23-yard field goal, 11:16. Jets 20–7. **Drive: 7 plays, 51 yards, 3:44.**
- NYJ – Jerald Sowell 4-yard pass from Chad Pennington (Doug Brien kick), 3:31. Jets 27–7. **Drive: 9 plays, 49 yards, 5:24.**
- SDG – LaDainian Tomlinson 4-yard run (Nate Kaeding kick), 2:12. Jets 27–14. **Drive: 4 plays, 71 yards, 1:19.**

**Fourth quarter**

- SDG – Reche Caldwell 33-yard pass from Drew Brees (Nate Kaeding kick), 7:38. Jets 27–21. **Drive: 6 plays, 61 yards, 2:21.**
- NYJ – Chris Baker 1-yard pass from Chad Pennington (Doug Brien kick), 3:56. Jets 34–21. **Drive: 6 plays, 70 yards, 3:42.**
- SDG – Doug Flutie 6-yard run (Nate Kaeding kick), 0:30. Jets 34–28. **Drive: 18 plays, 81 yards, 3:26.**

**Top passers**

- NYJ – Chad Pennington – 22/29, 258 yards, 2 TD
- SDG – Drew Brees – 8/19, 146 yards, TD, 2 INT

**Top rushers**

- NYJ – Curtis Martin – 32 rushes, 119 yards, 2 TD
- SDG – LaDainian Tomlinson – 19 rushes, 87 yards, TD

**Top receivers**

- NYJ – Santana Moss – 4 receptions, 97 yards
- SDG – LaDainian Tomlinson – 3 receptions, 76 yards

==== Week 3: at Denver Broncos ====
Week 3: San Diego Chargers at Denver Broncos

Quarter	1	2	3	4	Total
Chargers	3	0	7	3	**13**
**Broncos**	7	6	7	3	**23**

at Invesco Field at Mile High, Denver, Colorado

- Date: September 26
- Game time: 2:05 p.m. MDT
- Game weather: 73 °F (22.8 °C), humidity 26 percent, wind 7 miles per hour (11 km/h; 6.1 kn)
- Game attendance: 74,533
- Referee: Johnny Grier
- TV announcers (CBS): Dick Enberg, Dan Dierdorf and Armen Keteyian
- Box score

Game information

**First quarter**

- DEN – Rod Smith 16-yard pass from Jake Plummer (Jason Elam kick), 8:15. Broncos 7–0. **Drive: 6 plays, 72 yards, 3:27.**
- SDG – Nate Kaeding 23-yard field goal, 2:18. Broncos 7–3. **Drive: 11 plays, 70 yards, 5:57.**

**Second quarter**

- DEN – Jason Elam 22-yard field goal, 12:24. Broncos 10–3. **Drive: 11 plays, 70 yards, 4:54.**
- DEN – Jason Elam 23-yard field goal, 7:43. Broncos 13–3. **Drive: 6 plays, 23 yards, 3:14.**

**Third quarter**

- SDG – Drew Brees 1-yard run (Nate Kaeding kick), 7:37. Broncos 13–10. **Drive: 7 plays, 36 yards, 3:40.**
- DEN – Ashley Lelie 33-yard pass from Jake Plummer (Jason Elam kick), 3:29. Broncos 20–10. **Drive: 9 plays, 64 yards, 4:08.**

**Fourth quarter**

- SDG – Nate Kaeding 51-yard field goal, 14:06. Broncos 20–13. **Drive: 10 plays, 41 yards, 4:23.**
- DEN – Jason Elam 43-yard field goal, 11:12. Broncos 23–13. **Drive: 6 plays, 25 yards, 2:54.**

**Top passers**

- SDG – Drew Brees – 14/29, 121 yards
- DEN – Jake Plummer – 25/36, 294 yards, 2 TD

**Top rushers**

- SDG – LaDainian Tomlinson – 22 rushes, 60 yards
- DEN – Garrison Hearst – 3 rushes, 13 yards

**Top receivers**

- SDG – Reche Caldwell – 3 receptions, 39 yards
- DEN – Rod Smith – 5 receptions, 75 yards, TD

==== Week 4: vs. Tennessee Titans ====
Week 4: Tennessee Titans at San Diego Chargers

Quarter	1	2	3	4	Total
Titans	0	7	0	10	**17**
**Chargers**	7	14	3	14	**38**

at Qualcomm Stadium, San Diego, California

- Date: October 3
- Game time: 1:15 p.m. PDT
- Game weather: 74 °F (23.3 °C), humidity 69 percent, wind 9 miles per hour (14 km/h; 7.8 kn)
- Game attendance: 54,006
- Referee: Mike Carey
- TV announcers (CBS (Blacked out locally)): Bill Macatee, Steve Beuerlein and Scott Kaplan
- Box score

Game information

**First quarter**

- SDG – LaDainian Tomlinson 15-yard run (Nate Kaeding kick), 5:56. Chargers 7–0. **Drive: 5 plays, 89 yards, 2:45.**

**Second quarter**

- TEN – Derrick Mason 4-yard pass from Billy Volek (Gary Anderson kick), 14:10. Tied 7–7. **Drive: 12 plays, 80 yards, 6:46.**
- SDG – Antonio Gates 11-yard pass from Drew Brees (Nate Kaeding kick), 5:16. Chargers 14–7. **Drive: 7 plays, 59 yards, 3:57.**
- SDG – Justin Peelle 10-yard pass from Drew Brees (Nate Kaeding kick), 0:38. Chargers 21–7. **Drive: 8 plays, 51 yards, 3:37.**

**Third quarter**

- SDG – Nate Kaeding 31-yard field goal, 4:18. Chargers 24–7. **Drive: 5 plays, 51 yards, 2:37.**

**Fourth quarter**

- TEN – Gary Anderson 24-yard field goal, 12:26. Chargers 24–10. **Drive: 16 plays, 66 yards, 6:52.**
- TEN – Shad Meier 3-yard pass from Billy Volek (Gary Anderson kick), 7:04. Chargers 24–17. **Drive: 10 plays, 58 yards, 5:22.**
- SDG – Reche Caldwell 58-yard pass from Drew Brees (Nate Kaeding kick), 6:42. Chargers 31–17. **Drive: 2 plays, 58 yards, 0:22.**
- SDG – Jesse Chatman 21-yard run (Nate Kaeding kick), 3:18. Chargers 38–17. **Drive: 1 play, 21 yards, 0:07.**

**Top passers**

- TEN – Billy Volek – 39/58, 279 yards, 2 TD
- SDG – Drew Brees – 16/20, 206 yards, 3 TD

**Top rushers**

- TEN – Chris Brown – 15 rushes, 55 yards
- SDG – LaDainian Tomlinson – 17 rushes, 147 yards, TD

**Top receivers**

- TEN – Drew Bennett – 9 receptions, 109 yards
- SDG – Reche Caldwell – 3 receptions, 110 yards, TD

==== Week 5: vs. Jacksonville Jaguars ====
Week 5: Jacksonville Jaguars at San Diego Chargers

Quarter	1	2	3	4	Total
Jaguars	0	7	0	14	**21**
**Chargers**	14	7	6	7	**34**

at Qualcomm Stadium, San Diego, California

- Date: October 10
- Game time: 1:05 p.m. PDT
- Game weather: 68 °F (20 °C), humidity 76 percent, wind 9 miles per hour (14 km/h; 7.8 kn)
- Game attendance: 52,101
- Referee: Tony Corrente
- TV announcers (CBS (Blacked out locally)): Ian Eagle, Solomon Wilcots and Scott Kaplan
- Box score

Game information

**First quarter**

- SDG – Antonio Gates 1-yard pass from Drew Brees (Nate Kaeding kick), 10:14. Chargers 7–0. **Drive: 11 plays, 66 yards, 4:46.**
- SDG – LaDainian Tomlinson 1-yard run (Nate Kaeding kick), 4:03. Chargers 14–0. **Drive: 8 plays, 76 yards, 4:13.**

**Second quarter**

- SDG – Antonio Gates 11-yard pass from Drew Brees (Nate Kaeding kick), 9:23. Chargers 21–0. **Drive: 5 plays, 21 yards, 2:03.**
- JAC – Chris Fuamatu-Maʻafala 1-yard run (Josh Scobee kick), 1:33. Chargers 21–7. **Drive: 15 plays, 77 yards, 7:50.**

**Third quarter**

- SDG – Nate Kaeding 21-yard field goal, 7:15. Chargers 24–7. **Drive: 12 plays, 73 yards, 6:31.**
- SDG – Nate Kaeding 28-yard field goal, 0:46. Chargers 27–7. **Drive: 4 plays, 3 yards, 0:54.**

**Fourth quarter**

- JAC – Byron Leftwich 2-yard run (Josh Scobee kick), 10:42. Chargers 27–14. **Drive: 14 plays, 77 yards, 5:04.**
- SDG – Jesse Chatman 41-yard run (Nate Kaeding kick), 9:54. Chargers 34–14. **Drive: 2 plays, 72 yards, 0:48.**
- JAC – Cortez Hankton 7-yard pass from Byron Leftwich (Josh Scobee kick), 7:21. Chargers 34–21. **Drive: 7 plays, 79 yards, 2:33.**

**Top passers**

- JAC – Byron Leftwich – 36/54, 357 yards, TD, 2 INT
- SDG – Drew Brees – 17/26, 211 yards, 2 TD

**Top rushers**

- JAC – Fred Taylor – 11 rushes, 64 yards
- SDG – Jesse Chatman – 11 rushes, 103 yards, TD

**Top receivers**

- JAC – Jimmy Smith – 8 receptions, 113 yards
- SDG – Antonio Gates – 8 receptions, 93 yards, 2 TD

==== Week 6: at Atlanta Falcons ====
Week 6: San Diego Chargers at Atlanta Falcons

Quarter	1	2	3	4	Total
Chargers	0	14	3	3	**20**
**Falcons**	0	7	0	14	**21**

at Georgia Dome, Atlanta, Georgia

- Date: October 17
- Game time: 1:02 p.m. EDT
- Game weather: N/A (game played indoors)
- Game attendance: 70,187
- Referee: Walt Anderson
- TV announcers (CBS): Gus Johnson and Brent Jones
- Box score

Game information

**First quarter**

- No scoring plays.

**Second quarter**

- ATL – Alge Crumpler 19-yard pass from Michael Vick (Jay Feely kick), 10:24. Falcons 7–0. **Drive: 5 plays, 63 yards, 2:49.**
- SDG – LaDainian Tomlinson 1-yard run (Nate Kaeding kick), 1:18. Tied 7–7. **Drive: 15 plays, 67 yards, 9:06.**
- SDG – Eric Parker 17-yard pass from Drew Brees (Nate Kaeding kick), 0:18. Chargers 14–7. **Drive: 3 plays, 39 yards, 0:20.**

**Third quarter**

- SDG – Nate Kaeding 53-yard field goal, 5:10. Chargers 17–7. **Drive: 6 plays, 8 yards, 3:13.**

**Fourth quarter**

- ATL – Michael Vick 14-yard run (Jay Feely kick), 13:09. Chargers 17–14. **Drive: 4 plays, 75 yards, 1:43.**
- ATL – Dez White 32-yard pass from Michael Vick (Jay Feely kick), 10:12. Falcons 21–17. **Drive: 3 plays, 47 yards, 1:02.**
- SDG – Nate Kaeding 28-yard field goal, 6:01. Falcons 21–20. **Drive: 8 plays, 65 yards, 4:11.**

**Top passers**

- SDG – Drew Brees – 23/31, 227 yards, TD, INT
- ATL – Michael Vick – 12/21, 218 yards, 2 TD, INT

**Top rushers**

- SDG – LaDainian Tomlinson – 23 rushes, 64 yards, TD
- ATL – T. J. Duckett – 11 rushes, 45 yards

**Top receivers**

- SDG – Antonio Gates – 6 receptions, 80 yards
- ATL – Peerless Price – 2 receptions, 67 yards

==== Week 7: at Carolina Panthers ====
Week 7: San Diego Chargers at Carolina Panthers

Quarter	1	2	3	4	Total
**Chargers**	0	0	10	7	**17**
Panthers	6	0	0	0	**6**

- Date: October 24
- Game time: 1:02 p.m. EDT
- Game weather: 58 °F (14.4 °C), humidity 90 percent, wind 7 miles per hour (11 km/h; 6.1 kn)
- Game attendance: 73,096
- Referee: Ron Winter
- TV announcers (CBS): Gus Johnson and Brent Jones
- Box score

Game information

**First quarter**

- CAR – John Kasay 28-yard field goal, 8:21. Panthers 3–0. **Drive: 12 plays, 63 yards, 6:39.**
- CAR – John Kasay 21-yard field goal, 3:28. Panthers 6–0. **Drive: 8 plays, 30 yards, 4:34.**

**Second quarter**

- No scoring plays.

**Third quarter**

- SDG – LaDainian Tomlinson 8-yard run (Nate Kaeding kick), 8:13. Chargers 7–6. **Drive: 7 plays, 64 yards, 3:33.**
- SDG – Nate Kaeding 44-yard field goal, 2:36. Chargers 10–6. **Drive: 10 plays, 46 yards, 4:32.**

**Fourth quarter**

- SDG – Jesse Chatman 5-yard run (Nate Kaeding kick), 1:42. Chargers 17–6. **Drive: 7 plays, 76 yards, 1:37.**

**Top passers**

- SDG – Drew Brees – 21/32, 196 yards
- CAR – Jake Delhomme – 17/36, 155 yards, INT

**Top rushers**

- SDG – Jesse Chatman – 8 rushes, 69 yards, TD
- CAR – Brad Hoover – 24 rushes, 99 yards

**Top receivers**

- SDG – Keenan McCardell – 5 receptions, 65 yards
- CAR – Keary Colbert – 7 receptions, 71 yards

==== Week 8: vs. Oakland Raiders ====
Week 8: Oakland Raiders at San Diego Chargers

Quarter	1	2	3	4	Total
Raiders	0	7	7	0	**14**
**Chargers**	14	14	14	0	**42**

at Qualcomm Stadium, San Diego, California

- Date: October 31
- Game time: 1:15 p.m. PST
- Game weather: 69 °F (20.6 °C), humidity 57 percent, wind 8 miles per hour (13 km/h; 7.0 kn)
- Game attendance: 66,210
- Referee: Bill Carollo
- TV announcers (CBS): Gus Johnson, Brent Jones and Scott Kaplan
- Box score

Game information

**First quarter**

- SDG – Justin Peelle 17-yard pass from Drew Brees (Nate Kaeding kick), 11:14. Chargers 7–0. **Drive: 5 plays, 66 yards, 2:06.**
- SDG – LaDainian Tomlinson 1-yard run (Nate Kaeding kick), 0:08. Chargers 14–0. **Drive: 7 plays, 29 yards, 3:15.**

**Second quarter**

- OAK – Tyrone Wheatley 5-yard run (Sebastian Janikowski kick), 10:02. Chargers 14–7. **Drive: 10 plays, 74 yards, 5:06.**
- SDG – Keenan McCardell 13-yard pass from Drew Brees (Nate Kaeding kick), 4:56. Chargers 21–7. **Drive: 9 plays, 80 yards, 5:06.**
- SDG – Tim Dwight 23-yard pass from Drew Brees (Nate Kaeding kick), 0:36. Chargers 28–7. **Drive: 4 plays, 53 yards, 1:57.**

**Third quarter**

- SDG – Antonio Gates 5-yard pass from Drew Brees (Nate Kaeding kick), 12:05. Chargers 35–7. **Drive: 5 plays, 50 yards, 2:55.**
- SDG – Antonio Gates 1-yard pass from Drew Brees (Nate Kaeding kick), 3:08. Chargers 42–7. **Drive: 12 plays, 90 yards, 6:28.**
- OAK – Doug Jolley 13-yard pass from Kerry Collins (Sebastian Janikowski kick), 0:02. Chargers 42–14. **Drive: 6 plays, 60 yards, 3:06.**

**Fourth quarter**

- No scoring plays.

**Top passers**

- OAK – Kerry Collins – 24/39, 263 yards, TD, 2 INT
- SDG – Drew Brees – 22/25, 281 yards, 5 TD

**Top rushers**

- OAK – Tyrone Wheatley – 4 rushes, 23 yards, TD
- SDG – LaDainian Tomlinson – 19 rushes, 71 yards, TD

**Top receivers**

- OAK – Jerry Porter – 4 receptions, 50 yards
  OAK – Doug Gabriel – 3 receptions, 50 yards
- SDG – Eric Parker – 6 receptions, 91 yards

==== Week 9: vs. New Orleans Saints ====
Week 9: New Orleans Saints at San Diego Chargers

Quarter	1	2	3	4	Total
Saints	0	7	0	10	**17**
**Chargers**	14	6	16	7	**43**

at Qualcomm Stadium, San Diego, California

- Game time: 1:05 p.m. PST
- Game weather: 63 °F (17.2 °C), humidity 78 percent, wind 8 miles per hour (13 km/h; 7.0 kn)
- Game attendance: 59,662
- Referee: Peter Morelli
- TV announcers (FOX (Blacked out locally)): Thom Brennaman and JC Pearson
- Box score

Game information

**First quarter**

- SDG – Antonio Gates 12-yard pass from Drew Brees (Nate Kaeding kick), 9:50. Chargers 7–0. **Drive: 10 plays, 73 yards, 5:10.**
- SDG – LaDainian Tomlinson 1-yard run (Nate Kaeding kick), 5:29. Chargers 14–0. **Drive: 5 plays, 70 yards, 3:06.**

**Second quarter**

- SDG – Nate Kaeding 40-yard field goal, 13:02. Chargers 17–0. **Drive: 6 plays, 41 yards, 1:50.**
- NO – Deuce McAllister 2-yard run (John Carney kick), 8:12. Chargers 17–7. **Drive: 10 plays, 68 yards, 4:50.**
- SDG – Nate Kaeding 27-yard field goal, 3:16. Chargers 20–7. **Drive: 10 plays, 64 yards, 4:56.**

**Third quarter**

- SDG – Safety, Wayne Gandy called for offensive holding in end zone, 8:36. Chargers 22–7.
- SDG – Antonio Gates 7-yard pass from Drew Brees (Nate Kaeding kick), 3:15. Chargers 29–7. **Drive: 12 plays, 64 yards, 5:21.**
- SDG – Antonio Gates 2-yard pass from Drew Brees (Nate Kaeding kick), 2:04. Chargers 36–7. **Drive: 2 plays, 40 yards, 0:52.**

**Fourth quarter**

- NO – John Carney 37-yard field goal, 13:53. Chargers 36–10. **Drive: 9 plays, 29 yards, 3:11.**
- SDG – Kassim Osgood 12-yard pass from Drew Brees (Nate Kaeding kick), 7:06. Chargers 43–10. **Drive: 10 plays, 72 yards, 6:47.**
- NO – Boo Williams 6-yard pass from Aaron Brooks (John Carney kick), 4:04. Chargers 43–17. **Drive: 9 plays, 60 yards, 3:02.**

**Top passers**

- NO – Aaron Brooks – 16/29, 173 yards, TD, INT
- SDG – Drew Brees – 22/36, 257 yards, 4 TD

**Top rushers**

- NO – Deuce McAllister – 16 rushes, 63 yards, TD
- SDG – Jesse Chatman – 7 rushes, 51 yards

**Top receivers**

- NO – Boo Williams – 5 receptions, 71 yards, TD
- SDG – Keenan McCardell – 6 receptions, 89 yards

==== Week 11: at Oakland Raiders ====
Week 11: San Diego Chargers at Oakland Raiders

Quarter	1	2	3	4	Total
**Chargers**	6	7	3	7	**23**
Raiders	0	7	7	3	**17**

at McAfee Coliseum, Oakland, California

- Date: November 21
- Game time: 1:05 p.m. PST
- Game weather: 61 °F (16.1 °C), humidity 28 percent, wind 18 miles per hour (29 km/h; 16 kn)
- Game attendance: 46,905
- Referee: Bernie Kukar
- TV announcers (CBS): Don Criqui and Steve Tasker
- Box score

Game information

**First quarter**

- SDG – Antonio Gates 11-yard pass from Drew Brees (kick blocked), 9:05. Chargers 6–0. **Drive: 13 plays, 73 yards, 5:55.**

**Second quarter**

- SDG – Drew Brees 6-yard run (Nate Kaeding kick), 10:07. Chargers 13–0. **Drive: 9 plays, 56 yards, 4:39.**
- OAK – Ronald Curry 22-yard pass from Kerry Collins (Sebastian Janikowski kick), 6:40. Chargers 13–7. **Drive: 7 plays, 68 yards, 3:27.**

**Third quarter**

- SDG – Nate Kaeding 19-yard field goal, 5:21. Chargers 16–7. **Drive: 9 plays, 22 yards, 3:56.**
- OAK – Teyo Johnson 8-yard pass from Kerry Collins (Sebastian Janikowski kick), 1:58. Chargers 16–14. **Drive: 7 plays, 54 yards, 3:23.**

**Fourth quarter**

- SDG – LaDainian Tomlinson 6-yard run (Nate Kaeding kick), 11:06. Chargers 23–14. **Drive: 12 plays, 63 yards, 5:52.**
- OAK – Sebastian Janikowski 31-yard field goal, 7:11. Chargers 23–17. **Drive: 10 plays, 56 yards, 3:55.**

**Top passers**

- SDG – Drew Brees – 18/34, 226 yards, TD
- OAK – Kerry Collins – 18/30, 227 yards, 2 TD

**Top rushers**

- SDG – LaDainian Tomlinson – 37 rushes, 164 yards, TD
- OAK – Tyrone Wheatley – 12 rushes, 42 yards

**Top receivers**

- SDG – Antonio Gates – 8 receptions, 101 yards, TD
- OAK – Jerry Porter – 5 receptions, 63 yards

==== Week 12: at Kansas City Chiefs ====
Week 12: San Diego Chargers at Kansas City Chiefs

Quarter	1	2	3	4	Total
**Chargers**	7	7	3	17	**34**
Chiefs	7	10	0	14	**31**

at Arrowhead Stadium, Kansas City, Missouri

- Date: November 28
- Game time: 12:00 p.m. CST
- Game weather: 35 °F (1.7 °C), humidity 75 percent, wind 14 miles per hour (23 km/h; 12 kn)
- Game attendance: 77,447
- Referee: Bill Vinovich
- TV announcers (CBS): Kevin Harlan and Randy Cross
- Box score

Game information

**First quarter**

- SDG – LaDainian Tomlinson 1-yard run (Nate Kaeding kick), 7:01. Chargers 7–0. **Drive: 3 plays, 57 yards, 1:00.**
- KAN – Derrick Blaylock 5-yard run (Lawrence Tynes kick), 4:26. Tied 7–7. **Drive: 6 plays, 60 yards, 2:35.**

**Second quarter**

- KAN – Larry Johnson 6-yard run (Lawrence Tynes kick), 9:05. Chiefs 14–7. **Drive: 13 plays, 94 yards, 6:00.**
- SDG – LaDainian Tomlinson 3-yard run (Nate Kaeding kick), 3:11. Tied 14–14. **Drive: 12 plays, 65 yards, 5:54.**
- KAN – Lawrence Tynes 28-yard field goal, 0:45. Chiefs 17–14. **Drive: 11 plays, 58 yards, 2:26.**

**Third quarter**

- SDG – Nate Kaeding 25-yard field goal, 7:24. Tied 17–17. **Drive: 5 plays, 43 yards, 2:15.**

**Fourth quarter**

- KAN – Derrick Blaylock 22-yard run (kick failed), 14:17. Chiefs 23–17. **Drive: 9 plays, 84 yards, 4:29.**
- SDG – Antonio Gates 18-yard pass from Drew Brees (Nate Kaeding kick), 10:13. Chargers 24–23. **Drive: 6 plays, 71 yards, 4:04.**
- KAN – Dante Hall 96-yard kickoff return (Eddie Kennison pass from Trent Green), 10:00. Chiefs 31–24. **Drive: 0 plays, 0 yards, 0:13.**
- SDG – Antonio Gates 11-yard pass from Drew Brees (Nate Kaeding kick), 6:22. Tied 31–31. **Drive: 5 plays, 69 yards, 3:38.**
- SDG – Nate Kaeding 43-yard field goal, 2:24. Chargers 34–31. **Drive: 7 plays, 8 yards, 2:26.**

**Top passers**

- SDG – Drew Brees – 28/37, 378 yards, 2 TD
- KAN – Trent Green – 21/34, 208 yards, INT

**Top rushers**

- SDG – Eric Parker – 2 rushes, 58 yards
- KAN – Derrick Blaylock – 8 rushes, 57 yards, 2 TD

**Top receivers**

- SDG – Antonio Gates – 7 receptions, 92 yards, 2 TD
  SDG – Kassim Osgood – 2 receptions, 92 yards
- KAN – Tony Gonzalez – 8 receptions, 105 yards

==== Week 13: vs. Denver Broncos ====
Week 13: Denver Broncos at San Diego Chargers

Quarter	1	2	3	4	Total
Broncos	0	7	0	10	**17**
**Chargers**	7	10	3	0	**20**

at Qualcomm Stadium, San Diego, California

- Date: December 5
- Game time: 1:05 p.m. PST
- Game weather: 58 °F (14.4 °C), humidity 77 percent, wind 9 miles per hour (14 km/h; 7.8 kn)
- Game attendance: 65,395
- Referee: Ron Winter
- TV announcers (CBS): Jim Nantz, Phil Simms and Scott Kaplan
- Box score

Game information

**First quarter**

- SDG – LaDainian Tomlinson 5-yard run (Nate Kaeding kick), 12:01. Chargers 7–0. **Drive: 4 plays, 43 yards, 1:26.**

**Second quarter**

- DEN – Tatum Bell 16-yard run (Jason Elam kick), 13:27. Tied 7–7. **Drive: 5 plays, 64 yards, 2:33.**
- SDG – LaDainian Tomlinson 1-yard run (Nate Kaeding kick), 7:05. Chargers 14–7. **Drive: 6 plays, 21 yards, 2:49.**
- SDG – Nate Kaeding 23-yard field goal, 0:00. Chargers 17–7. **Drive: 5 plays, 13 yards, 1:30.**

**Third quarter**

- SDG – Nate Kaeding 23-yard field goal, 5:12. Chargers 20–7. **Drive: 10 plays, 43 yards, 4:12.**

**Fourth quarter**

- DEN – Reuben Droughns 4-yard run (Jason Elam kick), 14:18. Chargers 20–14. **Drive: 6 plays, 65 yards, 2:26.**
- DEN – Jason Elam 31-yard field goal, 9:26. Chargers 20–17. **Drive: 9 plays, 49 yards, 3:47.**

**Top passers**

- DEN – Jake Plummer – 16/40, 278 yards, 4 INT
- SDG – Drew Brees – 14/27, 106 yards, INT

**Top rushers**

- DEN – Reuben Droughns – 14 rushes, 38 yards, TD
- SDG – LaDainian Tomlinson – 30 rushes, 113 yards, 2 TD

**Top receivers**

- DEN – Ashley Lelie – 4 receptions, 105 yards
- SDG – Eric Parker – 3 receptions, 37 yards

==== Week 14: vs. Tampa Bay Buccaneers ====
Week 14: Tampa Bay Buccaneers at San Diego Chargers

Quarter	1	2	3	4	Total
Buccaneers	0	7	7	10	**24**
**Chargers**	0	14	7	10	**31**

at Qualcomm Stadium, San Diego, California

- Date: December 12
- Game time: 1:15 p.m. PST
- Game weather: 69 °F (20.6 °C), humidity 63 percent, wind 8 miles per hour (13 km/h; 7.0 kn)
- Game attendance: 65,858
- Referee: Mike Carey
- TV announcers (FOX): Thom Brennaman, JC Pearson and C. S. Keys
- Box score

Game information

**First quarter**

- No scoring plays.

**Second quarter**

- SDG – Eric Parker 79-yard pass from Drew Brees (Nate Kaeding kick), 11:49. Chargers 7–0. **Drive: 1 play, 79 yards, 0:12.**
- TB – Joey Galloway 36-yard pass from Brian Griese (Jay Taylor kick), 9:02. Tied 7–7. **Drive: 5 plays, 81 yards, 2:47.**
- SDG – Kassim Osgood 19-yard pass from Drew Brees (Nate Kaeding kick), 0:49. Chargers 14–7. **Drive: 10 plays, 80 yards, 2:50.**

**Third quarter**

- TB – Joey Galloway 4-yard pass from Brian Griese (Jay Taylor kick), 4:56. Tied 14–14. **Drive: 12 plays, 68 yards, 6:08.**
- SDG – LaDainian Tomlinson 7-yard run (Nate Kaeding kick), 0:30. Chargers 21–14. **Drive: 7 plays, 81 yards, 4:26.**

**Fourth quarter**

- TB – Michael Clayton 20-yard pass from Brian Griese (Jay Taylor kick), 6:53. Tied 21–21. **Drive: 2 plays, 37 yards, 0:49.**
- SDG – Donnie Edwards 30-yard interception return (Nate Kaeding kick), 4:09. Chargers 28–21.
- SDG – Nate Kaeding 40-yard field goal, 2:06. Chargers 31–21. **Drive: 4 plays, 6 yards, 1:04.**
- TB – Jay Taylor 31-yard field goal, 0:16. Chargers 31–24. **Drive: 8 plays, 38 yards, 1:50.**

**Top passers**

- TB – Brian Griese – 36/50, 392 yards, 3 TD, 3 INT
- SDG – Drew Brees – 17/23, 220 yards, 2 TD, 2 INT

**Top rushers**

- TB – Michael Pittman – 12 rushes, 42 yards
- SDG – LaDainian Tomlinson – 25 rushes, 131 yards, TD

**Top receivers**

- TB – Michael Clayton – 9 receptions, 145 yards, TD
- SDG – Eric Parker – 6 receptions, 118 yards, TD

==== Week 15: at Cleveland Browns ====
Week 15: San Diego Chargers at Cleveland Browns

Quarter	1	2	3	4	Total
**Chargers**	7	7	7	0	**21**
Browns	0	0	0	0	**0**

at Cleveland Browns Stadium, Cleveland, Ohio

- Date: December 19
- Game time: 1:03 p.m. EST
- Game weather: 18 °F (−7.8 °C), humidity 68 percent, wind 30 miles per hour (48 km/h; 26 kn), wind chill −10 °F or −23.3 °C
- Game attendance: 72,489
- Referee: Tom White
- TV announcers (CBS): Gus Johnson and Brent Jones
- Box score

Game information

**First quarter**

- SDG – LaDainian Tomlinson 1-yard run (Nate Kaeding kick), 2:09. Chargers 7–0. **Drive: 14 plays, 80 yards, 1:00.**

**Second quarter**

- SDG – Antonio Gates 72-yard pass from Drew Brees (Nate Kaeding kick), 2:11. Chargers 14–0. **Drive: 1 play, 72 yards, 0:13.**

**Third quarter**

- SDG – LaDainian Tomlinson 1-yard run (Nate Kaeding kick), 8:32. Chargers 21–0. **Drive: 11 plays, 42 yards, 6:28.**

**Fourth quarter**

- No scoring plays.

**Top passers**

- SDG – Drew Brees – 4/6, 85 yards, TD
- CLE – Luke McCown – 11/27, 108 yards, INT

**Top rushers**

- SDG – LaDainian Tomlinson – 26 rushes, 111 yards, 2 TD
- CLE – Lee Suggs – 21 rushes, 105 yards

**Top receivers**

- SDG – Antonio Gates – 1 reception, 72 yards, TD
- CLE – Dennis Northcutt – 4 receptions, 61 yards

San Diego clinches its first division title since 1994.

==== Week 16: at Indianapolis Colts ====
Week 16: San Diego Chargers at Indianapolis Colts

Quarter	1	2	3	4	OT	Total
Chargers	7	10	7	7	0	**31**
**Colts**	0	9	7	15	3	**34**

at RCA Dome, Indianapolis, Indiana

- Date: December 26
- Game time: 1:00 p.m. EST
- Game weather: N/A (game played indoors)
- Game attendance: 57,330
- Referee: Walt Anderson
- TV announcers (CBS): Kevin Harlan and Randy Cross
- Box score

Game information

**First quarter**

- SDG – LaDainian Tomlinson 74-yard pass from Drew Brees (Nate Kaeding kick), 4:48. Chargers 7–0. **Drive: 5 plays, 92 yards, 2:52.**

**Second quarter**

- IND – Mike Vanderjagt 36-yard field goal, 14:18. Chargers 7–3. **Drive: 11 plays, 56 yards, 5:30.**
- SDG – Nate Kaeding 50-yard field goal, 12:46. Chargers 10–3. **Drive: 5 plays, 37 yards, 1:32.**
- SDG – Eric Parker 19-yard pass from Drew Brees (Nate Kaeding kick), 7:09. Chargers 17–3. **Drive: 8 plays, 61 yards, 4:03.**
- IND – Mike Vanderjagt 26-yard field goal, 4:30. Chargers 17–6. **Drive: 6 plays, 28 yards, 2:39.**
- IND – Mike Vanderjagt 23-yard field goal, 0:18. Chargers 17–9. **Drive: 10 plays, 85 yards, 2:32.**

**Third quarter**

- SDG – Antonio Gates 4-yard pass from Drew Brees (Nate Kaeding kick), 9:24. Chargers 24–9. **Drive: 9 plays, 70 yards, 4:40.**
- IND – James Mungro 3-yard pass from Peyton Manning (Mike Vanderjagt kick), 6:11. Chargers 24–16. **Drive: 7 plays, 72 yards, 3:13.**

**Fourth quarter**

- SDG – LaDainian Tomlinson 16-yard run (Nate Kaeding kick), 14:55. Chargers 31–16. **Drive: 11 plays, 71 yards, 6:16.**
- IND – Dominic Rhodes 88-yard kickoff return (Mike Vanderjagt kick), 14:42. Chargers 31–23. **Drive: 0 plays, 0 yards, 0:13.**
- IND – Brandon Stokley 14-yard pass from Peyton Manning (Edgerrin James run), 0:56. Tied 31–31. **Drive: 9 plays, 80 yards, 2:46.**

**Overtime**

- IND – Mike Vanderjagt 30-yard field goal, 12:13. Colts 34–31. **Drive: 5 plays, 61 yards, 2:47.**

**Top passers**

- SDG – Drew Brees – 21/31, 290 yards, 3 TD, INT
- IND – Peyton Manning – 27/44, 383 yards, 2 TD, INT

**Top rushers**

- SDG – LaDainian Tomlinson – 21 rushes, 81 yards, TD
- IND – Edgerrin James – 22 rushes, 86 yards

**Top receivers**

- SDG – Eric Parker – 7 receptions, 103 yards, TD
- IND – Brandon Stokley – 7 receptions, 123 yards, TD

==== Week 17: vs. Kansas City Chiefs ====
Week 17: Kansas City Chiefs at San Diego Chargers

Quarter	1	2	3	4	Total
Chiefs	0	3	0	14	**17**
**Chargers**	3	14	0	7	**24**

at Qualcomm Stadium, San Diego, California

- Date: January 2
- Game time: 1:15 p.m. PST
- Game weather: 59 °F (15 °C), humidity 87 percent, wind 9 miles per hour (14 km/h; 7.8 kn)
- Game attendance: 64,920
- Referee: Bill Leavy
- TV announcers (CBS): Ian Eagle, Solomon Wilcots and Scott Kaplan
- Box score

Game information

**First quarter**

- SDG – Nate Kaeding 34-yard field goal, 10:56. Chargers 3–0. **Drive: 9 plays, 50 yards, 4:04.**

**Second quarter**

- KAN – Lawrence Tynes 50-yard field goal, 7:08. Tied 3–3. **Drive: 10 plays, 39 yards, 5:26.**
- SDG – Doug Flutie 1-yard run (Nate Kaeding kick), 2:24. Chargers 10–3. **Drive: 8 plays, 87 yards, 4:44.**
- SDG – Ryan Krause 10-yard pass from Doug Flutie (Nate Kaeding kick), 0:12. Chargers 17–3. **Drive: 5 plays, 64 yards, 0:40.**

**Third quarter**

- No scoring plays.

**Fourth quarter**

- SDG – Malcom Floyd 13-yard pass from Philip Rivers (Nate Kaeding kick), 7:11. Chargers 24–3. **Drive: 4 plays, 39 yards, 2:11.**
- KAN – Larry Johnson 2-yard run (Lawrence Tynes kick), 4:10. Chargers 24–10. **Drive: 8 plays, 78 yards, 3:01.**
- KAN – Larry Johnson 14-yard pass from Trent Green (Lawrence Tynes kick), 2:10. Chargers 24–17. **Drive: 8 plays, 61 yards, 2:00.**

**Top passers**

- KAN – Doug Flutie – 13/22, 199 yards, TD
- SDG – Drew Brees – 28/37, 378 yards, 2 TD

**Top rushers**

- KAN – Larry Johnson – 17 rushes, 46 yards, TD
- SDG – Michael Turner – 15 rushes, 87 yards

**Top receivers**

- KAN – Tony Gonzalez – 14 receptions, 144 yards
- SDG – Ryan Krause – 5 receptions, 81 yards, TD

=== Standings ===
==== Division ====
AFC West
	W	L	T	PCT	DIV	CONF	PF	PA	STK
^{(4)} San Diego Chargers	12	4	0	.750	5–1	9–3	446	313	W1
^{(6)} Denver Broncos	10	6	0	.625	3–3	7–5	381	304	W2
Kansas City Chiefs	7	9	0	.438	3–3	6–6	483	435	L1
Oakland Raiders	5	11	0	.313	1–5	3–9	320	442	L2

==== Conference ====
AFC
#	Team	Division	W	L	T	PCT	DIV	CONF	SOS	SOV	STK
**Division leaders**
1	Pittsburgh Steelers	North	15	1	0	.938	5–1	11–1	.484	.479	W14
2	New England Patriots	East	14	2	0	.875	5–1	10–2	.492	.478	W2
3 (Note: Indianapolis clinched the AFC #3 seed instead of San Diego based upon head-to-head victory.)	Indianapolis Colts	South	12	4	0	.750	5–1	8–4	.500	.458	L1
4	San Diego Chargers	West	12	4	0	.750	5–1	9–3	.477	.411	W1
**Wild cards**
5 (Note: New York Jets clinched the AFC #5 seed instead of Denver based upon better record against common opponents (New York Jets were 5–0 to Denver’s 3–2 against San Diego, Cincinnati, Houston, and Miami).)	New York Jets	East	10	6	0	.625	3–3	7–5	.523	.406	L2
6	Denver Broncos	West	10	6	0	.625	3–3	7–5	.484	.450	W2
**Did not qualify for the postseason**
7 (Note: Jacksonville and Baltimore finished ahead of Buffalo because they each defeated Buffalo head-to-head.) (Note: Jacksonville finished ahead of Baltimore based upon better record against common opponents (Jacksonville were 3–2 against Baltimore’s 2–3 versus Pittsburgh, Indianapolis, Buffalo and Kansas City).)	Jacksonville Jaguars	South	9	7	0	.563	2–4	6–6	.527	.479	W1
8	Baltimore Ravens	North	9	7	0	.563	3–3	6–6	.551	.472	W1
9	Buffalo Bills	East	9	7	0	.563	3–3	5–7	.512	.382	L1
10	Cincinnati Bengals	North	8	8	0	.500	2–4	4–8	.543	.453	W2
11 (Note: Houston finished ahead of Kansas City based upon head-to-head victory.)	Houston Texans	South	7	9	0	.438	4–2	6–6	.504	.402	L1
12	Kansas City Chiefs	West	7	9	0	.438	3–3	6–6	.551	.509	L1
13 (Note: Oakland finished ahead of Tennessee based upon head-to-head victory.)	Oakland Raiders	West	5	11	0	.313	1–5	3–9	.570	.450	L2
14	Tennessee Titans	South	5	11	0	.313	1–5	3–9	.512	.463	W1
15 (Note: Miami finished ahead of Cleveland based upon head-to-head victory.)	Miami Dolphins	East	4	12	0	.250	1–5	2–10	.555	.438	L1
16	Cleveland Browns	North	4	12	0	.250	1–5	3–9	.590	.469	W1
**Tiebreakers** (Note: When breaking ties for three or more teams under the NFL's rules, they are first broken within divisions, then comparing only the highest-ranked remaining team from each division.)

== Postseason ==
Round	Date	Opponent (seed)	Result	Record	Venue	Attendance
Wild Card	January 8, 2005	New York Jets (5)	L 17–20	0–1	Qualcomm Stadium	67,536

=== Game summary ===
==== AFC Wild Card playoffs: vs. New York Jets ====
AFC Wild Card playoffs: New York Jets at San Diego Chargers

Quarter	1	2	3	4	OT	Total
Jets	0	7	10	0	3	20
Chargers	0	7	0	10	0	17

at Qualcomm Stadium, San Diego, California

- Game time: 5:14 p.m. PST
- Game weather: 55 °F (12.8 °C), humidity 86 percent, wind 8 miles per hour (13 km/h; 7.0 kn)
- Game attendance: 67,536
- Referee: Ed Hochuli
- TV announcers (ABC): Al Michaels, John Madden and Michele Tafoya
- Box score

Game information

First quarter

- No scoring plays.

Second quarter

- SDG – Keenan McCardell 26-yard pass from Drew Brees (Nate Kaeding kick), 9:26. Chargers 7–0. Drive: 13 plays, 88 yards, 8:25.
- NYJ – Anthony Becht 13-yard pass from Chad Pennington (Doug Brien kick), 2:54. Tied 7–7. Drive: 5 plays, 37 yards, 2:19.

Third quarter

- NYJ – Santana Moss 45-yard pass from Chad Pennington (Doug Brien kick), 10:29. Jets 14–7. Drive: 5 plays, 75 yards, 2:31.
- NYJ – Doug Brien 42-yard field goal, 1:23. Jets 17–7. Drive: 8 plays, 42 yards, 5:31.

Fourth quarter

- SDG – Nate Kaeding 35-yard field goal, 10:43. Jets 17–10. Drive: 12 plays, 54 yards, 5:40.
- SDG – Antonio Gates 1-yard pass from Drew Brees (Nate Kaeding kick), 0:11. Tied 17–17. Drive: 10 plays, 80 yards, 4:35.

Overtime

- NYJ – Doug Brien 28-yard field goal, 0:05. Jets 20–17. Drive: 8 plays, 60 yards, 4:14.

Top passers

- NYJ – Chad Pennington – 23/33, 279 yards, 2 TD
- SDG – Drew Brees – 31/42, 319 yards, 2 TD, INT

Top rushers

- NYJ – Curtis Martin – 18 rushes, 66 yards
- SDG – LaDainian Tomlinson – 26 rushes, 80 yards

Top receivers

- NYJ – Santana Moss – 4 receptions, 100 yards, TD
- SDG – Eric Parker – 9 receptions, 93 yards

Chargers lost but in 2005 missed the playoffs at 9-7.

== Awards ==
Three Chargers were named to the 2005 Pro Bowl, and four were named first or second team Associated Press (AP) All-Pros. Brees won the AP NFL Comeback Player of the Year with 18 1/2 of the 48 available votes, and Schottenheimer took the Coach of the Year award with 27 1/2 out of 48. Also, Brees and Tomlinson gained a vote each for Offensive Player of the Year, and Edwards gained a vote for Defensive Player of the Year.

Player	Position	Pro Bowl starter	Pro Bowl reserve	AP 1st team All-Pro	AP 2nd team All-Pro
Drew Brees	Quarterback		Yes	Yes	
Donnie Edwards	Linebacker				Yes
Antonio Gates	Tight end	Yes		Yes	
LaDainian Tomlinson	Running back		Yes	Yes	
Jamal Williams	Defensive tackle				Yes

== See also ==
- 2004 NFL season
