= 2005 San Diego Chargers season =

NFL team 46th season

- Owner: Alex Spanos
- General manager: A.J. Smith
- Head coach: Marty Schottenheimer
- Home stadium: Qualcomm Stadium

Results
- Record: 9–7
- Division place: 3rd AFC West
- Playoffs: Did not qualify
- All-Pros: 4: TE Antonio Gates (1st team); FB Lorenzo Neal (2nd team); RB LaDainian Tomlinson (2nd team); NT Jamal Williams (1st team)
- Pro Bowlers: 6: TE Antonio Gates; LB Shawne Merriman; ST Hanik Milligan; FB Lorenzo Neal; RB LaDainian Tomlinson; NT Jamal Williams

The 2005 San Diego Chargers season was the franchise's 36th season in the National Football League (NFL), and the 46th overall. The Chargers failed to improve on their 12–4 record in 2004, and finished the campaign 9–7 and 3rd overall in their division, missing out on the playoffs for the first time since 2003. Outside linebacker Shawne Merriman was named Rookie of the Year at the end of the season.

Despite missing the playoffs, the Chargers defeated some of the best teams in the NFL, such as the two time defending Super Bowl champions New England Patriots (41–17) and the previously undefeated Indianapolis Colts (26–17). Following the season, Drew Brees signed as a free agent with the New Orleans Saints. Brees was replaced by Philip Rivers who became a starter for the Chargers for the next 14 seasons.

== Offseason ==
=== Draft ===
2005 San Diego Chargers draft
| Round | Pick | Player | Position | College | Notes |
| 1 | 12 | Shawne Merriman * | OLB | Maryland | Pick from NYG |
| 1 | 28 | Luis Castillo | DT | Northwestern | |
| 2 | 61 | Vincent Jackson * | WR | Northern Colorado | |
| 4 | 130 | Darren Sproles * | RB | Kansas State | |
| 5 | 164 | Wesley Britt | OT | Alabama | |
| 6 | 167 | Wes Sims | OG | Oklahoma | Pick from MIA |
| 7 | 242 | Scott Mruczkowski | C | Bowling Green | |
Made roster † Pro Football Hall of Fame * Made at least one Pro Bowl during career

== Personnel ==
=== Staff ===
2005 San Diego Chargers staff
| Front office: Owner – Alex Spanos; President/chief executive officer – Dean Spanos; Executive vice president – Michael Spanos; Executive vice president/general manager – A. J. Smith; Assistant general manager/director of player personnel – Buddy Nix; Vice president of football operations – Ed McGuire; Director of college scouting – Jimmy Raye; Director of pro scouting – Fran Foley; Head coaches: Head coach – Marty Schottenheimer; Offensive coaches: Offensive coordinator – Cam Cameron; Quarterbacks – Brian Schottenheimer; Running backs – Clarence Shelmon; Wide receivers – James Lofton; Assistant wide receivers/quality control – Pete Carmichael, Jr.; Tight ends – Rob Chudzinski; Offensive line – Carl Mauck | Defensive coaches: Defensive coordinator – Wade Phillips; Defensive line – Wayne Nunnely; Linebackers – Greg Manusky; Assistant linebackers/quality control – John Pagano; Secondary – Brian Stewart; Assistant secondary – Albert Lewis; Special teams coaches: Special teams – Steve Crosby; Strength and conditioning: Strength and conditioning – Dave Redding; Assistant strength and conditioning – Matt Schiotz |

=== Roster ===
2005 San Diego Chargers roster
| Quarterbacks (QB): 9 Drew Brees; 7 A. J. Feeley; 17 Philip Rivers; Running backs (RB): 41 Lorenzo Neal FB; 34 Andrew Pinnock FB; 43 Darren Sproles; 21 LaDainian Tomlinson; 33 Michael Turner; Wide receivers (WR): 82 Reche Caldwell; 80 Malcom Floyd; 86 Drew Haddad; 83 Vincent Jackson; 87 Keenan McCardell; 88 Eric Parker; Tight ends (TE): 85 Antonio Gates; 84 Justin Peelle | Offensive linemen (OL): 68 Kris Dielman G; 79 Mike Goff G; 62 Bob Hallen C; 61 Nick Hardwick C; 75 Leander Jordan OT; 64 Cory Lekkerkerker OT; 63 Scott Mruczkowski C/G; 70 Shane Olivea OT; 60 Wes Sims G; Defensive linemen (DL): 97 Ryon Bingham NT; 93 Luis Castillo DE; 74 Jacques Cesaire DE; 99 Igor Olshansky DE; 98 Derreck Robinson DE; 78 DeQuincy Scott DE; 76 Jamal Williams NT | Linebackers (LB): 54 Stephen Cooper ILB; 59 Donnie Edwards ILB; 53 Steve Foley OLB; 58 Randall Godfrey ILB; 92 Marques Harris OLB; 56 Shawne Merriman OLB; 95 Shaun Phillips OLB; 57 Matt Wilhelm ILB; Defensive backs (DB): 36 Markus Curry CB; 22 Sammy Davis CB; 25 Jamar Fletcher CB; 29 Drayton Florence CB; 42 Clinton Hart S; 23 Quentin Jammer CB; 27 Bhawoh Jue FS; 31 Hanik Milligan SS; 28 Jerrell Pippens CB; 24 Jerry Wilson FS; Special teams (ST): 50 David Binn LS; 10 Nate Kaeding K; 5 Mike Scifres P | Practice squad: -- Greg Camarillo WR; -- Roger Cooper LB; -- Brock Edwards TE; -- Ben Johnson OT; -- Radell Lockhart DE; 26 Ray Perkins RB; -- Landon Trusty TE; -- Richard Yancey S; Reserve: 48 Terrence Kiel S (IR); 89 Ryan Krause TE (IR); 51 Ben Leber LB (IR); 72 Roman Oben OT (IR); 81 Kassim Osgood WR (IR); 52 Carlos Polk ILB (IR); 71 Courtney Van Buren OT (IR); Rookies in italics 53 active, 7 reserve, 8 practice squad |

== Preseason ==
| Date | Opponent | Result | Host Stadium | NFL Recap | Attendance |
|---|---|---|---|---|---|
| August 11, 2005 | at Green Bay Packers | L 7–10 | Lambeau Field | Gamebook | 69,611 |
| August 21, 2005 | St. Louis Rams | W 36–21 | Qualcomm Stadium | Gamebook | 54,421 |
| August 26, 2005 | at Minnesota Vikings | L 16–19 | Hubert H. Humphrey Metrodome | Gamebook | 64,172 |
| September 1, 2005 | San Francisco 49ers | W 28–24 | Qualcomm Stadium | Gamebook | 49,817 |

== Regular season ==
=== Schedule ===
In addition to their regular games with AFC West rivals, the Chargers played teams from the AFC East and NFC East as per the schedule rotation, and also played intraconference games against the Steelers and the Colts based on divisional positions from 2004.

| Week | Date | Opponent | Result | Record | Venue | Attendance | Recap |
|---|---|---|---|---|---|---|---|
| 1 | September 11 | Dallas Cowboys | **L** 24–28 | 0–1 | Qualcomm Stadium | 67,679 | Gamebook |
| 2 | September 18 | at **Denver Broncos** | **L** 17–20 | 0–2 | Invesco Field at Mile High | 75,310 | Gamebook |
| 3 | September 25 | New York Giants | **W** 45–23 | 1–2 | Qualcomm Stadium | 65,373 | Gamebook |
| 4 | October 2 | at New England Patriots | **W** 41–17 | 2–2 | Gillette Stadium | 68,756 | Gamebook |
| 5 | October 10 | Pittsburgh Steelers | **L** 22–24 | 2–3 | Qualcomm Stadium | 68,537 | Gamebook |
| 6 | October 16 | at **Oakland Raiders** | **W** 27–14 | 3–3 | McAfee Coliseum | 52,666 | Gamebook |
| 7 | October 23 | at Philadelphia Eagles | **L** 17–20 | 3–4 | Lincoln Financial Field | 67,747 | Gamebook |
| 8 | October 30 | **Kansas City Chiefs** | **W** 28–20 | 4–4 | Qualcomm Stadium | 65,750 | Gamebook |
| 9 | November 6 | at New York Jets | **W** 31–26 | 5–4 | Giants Stadium | 77,662 | Gamebook |
| 10 | Bye | | | | | | |
| 11 | November 20 | Buffalo Bills | **W** 48–10 | 6–4 | Qualcomm Stadium | 65,602 | Gamebook |
| 12 | November 27 | at Washington Redskins | **W** 23–17 (OT) | 7–4 | FedExField | 84,930 | Gamebook |
| 13 | December 4 | **Oakland Raiders** | **W** 34–10 | 8–4 | Qualcomm Stadium | 66,436 | Gamebook |
| 14 | December 11 | Miami Dolphins | **L** 21–23 | 8–5 | Qualcomm Stadium | 65,026 | Gamebook |
| 15 | December 18 | at Indianapolis Colts | **W** 26–17 | 9–5 | RCA Dome | 57,389 | Gamebook |
| 16 | December 24 | at **Kansas City Chiefs** | **L** 7–20 | 9–6 | Arrowhead Stadium | 75,956 | Gamebook |
| 17 | December 31 | **Denver Broncos** | **L** 7–23 | 9–7 | Qualcomm Stadium | 65,513 | Gamebook |

Note: Intra-division opponents are in bold text.

=== Game summaries ===
==== Week 1: vs. Dallas Cowboys ====
Week 1: Dallas Cowboys at San Diego Chargers – Game summary

| Quarter | 1 | 2 | 3 | 4 | Total |
|---|---|---|---|---|---|
| **Cowboys** | 0 | 14 | 7 | 7 | **28** |
| Chargers | 7 | 7 | 10 | 0 | **24** |

at Qualcomm Stadium, San Diego, California

- Date: September 11
- Game time: 1:15 p.m. PDT
- Game weather: 67 °F (19 °C), relative humidity 56%, wind 8 mph
- Game attendance: 67,679
- Referee: Peter Morelli
- TV announcers (FOX): Joe Buck, Troy Aikman and Patrick O’Neal
- Box score

Game information

**First quarter**

- SD – LaDainian Tomlinson 2-yard run (Nate Kaeding kick), 6:53. Chargers 7–0. **Drive: 11 plays, 67 yards, 5:08.**

**Second quarter**

- DAL – Patrick Crayton 20-yard pass from Drew Bledsoe (Jose Cortez kick), 13:34. Tied 7–7. **Drive: 9 plays, 80 yards, 4:36.**
- DAL – Keyshawn Johnson 13-yard pass from Drew Bledsoe (Jose Cortez kick), 9:46. Cowboys 14–7. **Drive: 5 plays, 34 yards, 2:47.**
- SD – Keenan McCardell 20-yard pass from Drew Brees (Nate Kaeding kick), 2:07. Tied 14–14. **Drive: 14 plays, 68 yards, 7:39.**

**Third quarter**

- SD – Keenan McCardell 17-yard pass from Drew Brees (Nate Kaeding kick), 10:31. Chargers 21–14. **Drive: 8 plays, 51 yards, 4:29.**
- DAL – Julius Jones 5-yard run (Jose Cortez kick), 5:41. Tied 21–21. **Drive: 11 plays, 80 yards, 4:50.**
- SD – Nate Kaeding 33-yard field goal, 0:12. Chargers 24–21. **Drive: 10 plays, 33 yards, 5:29.**

**Fourth quarter**

- DAL – Keyshawn Johnson 2-yard pass from Drew Bledsoe (Jose Cortez kick), 3:06. Cowboys 28–24. **Drive: 9 plays, 44 yards, 5:26.**

**Top passers**

- DAL – Drew Bledsoe – 18/24, 226 yards, 3 TD
- SD – Drew Brees – 18/35, 209 yards, 2 TD, 2 INT

**Top rushers**

- DAL – Julius Jones – 26 rushes, 93 yards, TD
- SD – LaDainian Tomlinson – 19 rushes, 72 yards, TD

**Top receivers**

- DAL – Patrick Crayton – 6 receptions, 89 yards, TD
- SD – Keenan McCardell – 9 receptions, 123 yards, 2 TD

==== Week 2: at Denver Broncos ====
Week 2: San Diego Chargers at Denver Broncos – Game summary

| Quarter | 1 | 2 | 3 | 4 | Total |
|---|---|---|---|---|---|
| Chargers | 0 | 14 | 0 | 3 | **17** |
| **Broncos** | 3 | 0 | 7 | 10 | **20** |

at Invesco Field, Denver, Colorado

- Date: September 18
- Game time: 2:15 p.m. MDT
- Game weather: 75 °F (24 °C), relative humidity 23%, wind 4 mph
- Game attendance: 75,310
- Referee: Gerry Austin
- TV announcers (CBS): Kevin Harlan and Randy Cross
- Box score

Game information

**First quarter**

- DEN – Jason Elam 45-yard field goal, 2:58. Broncos 3–0. **Drive: 7 plays, 28 yards, 3:08.**

**Second quarter**

- SD – LaDainian Tomlinson 16-yard run (Nate Kaeding kick), 12:13. Chargers 7–3. **Drive: 11 plays, 80 yards, 5:45.**
- SD – LaDainian Tomlinson 4-yard run (Nate Kaeding kick), 4:55. Chargers 14–3. **Drive: 8 plays, 83 yards, 4:40.**

**Third quarter**

- DEN – Champ Bailey 25-yard interception return (Jason Elam kick), 14:49. Chargers 14–10.

**Fourth quarter**

- DEN – Kyle Johnson 3-yard run (Jason Elam kick), 8:46. Broncos 17–14. **Drive: 2 plays, 29 yards, 0:55.**
- SD – Nate Kaeding 42-yard field goal, 5:21. Tied 17–17. **Drive: 8 plays, 49 yards, 3:25.**
- DEN – Jason Elam 41-yard field goal, 0:05. Broncos 20–17. **Drive: 12 plays, 57 yards, 5:16.**

**Top passers**

- SD – Drew Brees – 15/23, 175 yards, INT
- DEN – Jake Plummer – 23/37, 248 yards, INT

**Top rushers**

- SD – LaDainian Tomlinson – 19 rushes, 52 yards, 2 TD
- DEN – Mike Anderson – 15 rushes, 49 yards

**Top receivers**

- SD – Antonio Gates – 6 receptions, 80 yards
- DEN – Rod Smith – 8 receptions, 83 yards

==== Week 3: vs. New York Giants ====
Week 3: New York Giants at San Diego Chargers – Game summary

| Quarter | 1 | 2 | 3 | 4 | Total |
|---|---|---|---|---|---|
| Giants | 3 | 17 | 0 | 3 | **23** |
| **Chargers** | 7 | 14 | 14 | 10 | **45** |

at Qualcomm Stadium, San Diego, California

- Date: September 25
- Game time: 5:30 p.m. PDT
- Game weather: 68 °F (20 °C), relative humidity 71%, wind 8 mph
- Game attendance: 65,373
- Referee: Walt Anderson
- TV announcers (ESPN): Mike Patrick, Joe Theismann, Paul Maguire and Suzy Kolber
- Box score

Game information

**First quarter**

- NYG – Jay Feely 22-yard field goal, 8:28. Giants 3–0. **Drive: 12 plays, 75 yards, 6:32.**
- SD – LaDainian Tomlinson 1-yard run (Nate Kaeding kick), 4:23. Chargers 7–3. **Drive: 8 plays, 65 yards, 4:05.**

**Second quarter**

- SDG – Keenan McCardell 15-yard pass from Drew Brees (Nate Kaeding kick), 13:05. Chargers 14–3. **Drive: 7 plays, 85 yards, 3:55.**
- SD – LaDainian Tomlinson 3-yard run (Nate Kaeding kick), 9:35. Chargers 21–3. **Drive: 6 plays, 62 yards, 2:46.**
- NYG – Plaxico Burress 5-yard pass from Eli Manning (Jay Feely kick), 3:34. Chargers 21–10. **Drive: 9 plays, 65 yards, 6:01.**
- NYG – David Tyree 4-yard pass from Eli Manning (Jay Feely kick), 1:55. Chargers 21–17. **Drive: 2 plays, 34 yards, 0:18.**
- NYG – Jay Feely 40-yard field goal, 0:11. Chargers 21–20. **Drive: 8 plays, 58 yards, 1:12.**

**Third quarter**

- SD – Keenan McCardell 26-yard pass from LaDainian Tomlinson (Nate Kaeding kick), 13:08. Chargers 28–20. **Drive: 4 plays, 70 yards, 1:52.**
- SD – Antonio Gates 14-yard pass from Drew Brees (Nate Kaeding kick), 2:59. Chargers 35–20. **Drive: 11 plays, 77 yards, 6:48.**

**Fourth quarter**

- NYG – Jay Feely 28-yard field goal, 12:14. Chargers 35–23. **Drive: 16 plays, 59 yards, 5:45.**
- SD – LaDainian Tomlinson 5-yard run (Nate Kaeding kick), 8:30. Chargers 42–23. **Drive: 6 plays, 39 yards, 3:44.**
- SD – Nate Kaeding 44-yard field goal, 3:55. Chargers 45–23. **Drive: 5 plays, 65 yards, 2:38.**

**Top passers**

- NYG – Eli Manning – 24/41, 352 yards, 2 TD
- SD – Drew Brees – 19/22, 191 yards, 2 TD

**Top rushers**

- NYG – Tiki Barber – 15 rushes, 60 yards
- SD – LaDainian Tomlinson – 21 rushes, 192 yards, 3 TD

**Top receivers**

- NYG – Jeremy Shockey – 6 receptions, 101 yards
- SD – Antonio Gates – 6 receptions, 92 yards, TD

==== Week 4: at New England Patriots ====
Week 4: San Diego Chargers at New England Patriots – Game summary

| Quarter | 1 | 2 | 3 | 4 | Total |
|---|---|---|---|---|---|
| **Chargers** | 3 | 14 | 14 | 10 | **41** |
| Patriots | 7 | 10 | 0 | 0 | **17** |

at Gillette Stadium, Foxborough, Massachusetts

- Date: October 2
- Game time: 1:02 p.m. EDT
- Game weather: 73 °F (23 °C), relative humidity 51%, no wind
- Game attendance: 68,756
- Referee: Bill Leavy
- TV announcers (CBS): Jim Nantz, Phil Simms and Bonnie Bernstein
- Box score

Game information

**First quarter**

- SD – Nate Kaeding 42-yard field goal, 6:22. Chargers 3–0. **Drive: 7 plays, 49 yards, 3:55.**
- NE – Corey Dillon 1-yard run (Adam Vinatieri kick), 1:34. Patriots 7–3. **Drive: 9 plays, 70 yards, 4:48.**

**Second quarter**

- SD – Keenan McCardell 11-yard pass from Drew Brees (Nate Kaeding kick), 6:21. Chargers 10–7. **Drive: 9 plays, 57 yards, 5:31.**
- NE – Tim Dwight 30-yard pass from Tom Brady (Adam Vinatieri kick), 5:29. Patriots 14–10. **Drive: 2 plays, 44 yards, 0:52.**
- SD – LaDainian Tomlinson 8-yard run (Nate Kaeding kick), 2:47. Chargers 17–14. **Drive: 5 plays, 78 yards, 2:42.**
- NE – Adam Vinatieri 24-yard field goal, 0:21. Tied 17–17. **Drive: 14 plays, 77 yards, 2:26.**

**Third quarter**

- SD – LaDainian Tomlinson 1-yard run (Nate Kaeding kick), 6:16. Chargers 24–17. **Drive: 9 plays, 80 yards, 4:38.**
- SD – Reche Caldwell 28-yard pass from Drew Brees (Nate Kaeding kick), 0:19. Chargers 31–17. **Drive: 8 plays, 75 yards, 4:17.**

**Fourth quarter**

- SD – Nate Kaeding 21-yard field goal, 4:44. Chargers 34–17. **Drive: 15 plays, 72 yards, 8:55.**
- SD – Clinton Hart 40-yard interception return (Nate Kaeding kick), 0:34. Chargers 41–17.

**Top passers**

- SD – Drew Brees – 19/24, 248 yards, 2 TD
- NE – Tom Brady – 19/32, 224 yards, TD, INT

**Top rushers**

- SD – LaDainian Tomlinson – 25 rushes, 134 yards, 2 TD
- NE – Corey Dillon – 14 rushes, 63 yards, TD

**Top receivers**

- SD – Antonio Gates – 6 receptions, 108 yards
- NE – David Givens – 6 receptions, 66 yards

==== Week 5: vs. Pittsburgh Steelers ====
Week 5: Pittsburgh Steelers at San Diego Chargers – Game summary

| Quarter | 1 | 2 | 3 | 4 | Total |
|---|---|---|---|---|---|
| **Steelers** | 0 | 14 | 0 | 10 | **24** |
| Chargers | 0 | 7 | 6 | 9 | **22** |

at Qualcomm Stadium, San Diego, California

- Date: October 10
- Game time: 6:00 p.m. PDT
- Game weather: 64 °F (18 °C), relative humidity 59%, wind 8 mph
- Game attendance: 68,537
- Referee: Jeff Triplette
- TV announcers (ABC): Al Michaels, John Madden and Sam Ryan
- Box score

Game information

**First quarter**

- No scoring plays.

**Second quarter**

- PIT – Ben Roethlisberger 7-yard run (Jeff Reed kick), 9:14. Steelers 7–0. **Drive: 9 plays, 84 yards, 5:33.**
- PIT – Jerome Bettis 1-yard run (Jeff Reed kick), 1:37. Steelers 14–0. **Drive: 7 plays, 41 yards, 2:56.**
- SD – Antonio Gates 11-yard pass from Drew Brees (Nate Kaeding kick), 0:34. Steelers 14–7. **Drive: 4 plays, 47 yards, 1:03.**

**Third quarter**

- SD – Nate Kaeding 34-yard field goal, 9:42. Steelers 14–10. **Drive: 7 plays, 47 yards, 2:13.**
- SD – Nate Kaeding 32-yard field goal, 3:54. Steelers 14–13. **Drive: 8 plays, 45 yards, 2:53.**

**Fourth quarter**

- SD – Nate Kaeding 41-yard field goal, 11:41. Chargers 16–14. **Drive: 6 plays, 62 yards, 3:50.**
- PIT – Heath Miller 16-yard pass from Ben Roethlisberger (Jeff Reed kick), 10:30. Steelers 21–16. **Drive: 3 plays, 62 yards, 1:11.**
- SD – LaDainian Tomlinson 2-yard run (run failed), 4:42. Chargers 22–21. **Drive: 11 plays, 62 yards, 5:48.**
- PIT – Jeff Reed 40-yard field goal, 0:06. Chargers 24–22. **Drive: 11 plays, 40 yards, 4:36.**

**Top passers**

- PIT – Ben Roethlisberger – 17/26, 225 yards, TD
- SD – Drew Brees – 20/35, 219 yards, TD, INT

**Top rushers**

- PIT – Jerome Bettis – 17 rushes, 54 yards, TD
- SD – LaDainian Tomlinson – 18 rushes, 62 yards, TD

**Top receivers**

- PIT – Hines Ward – 6 receptions, 83 yards
- SD – Eric Parker – 5 receptions, 72 yards

==== Week 6: at Oakland Raiders ====
Week 6: San Diego Chargers at Oakland Raiders – Game summary

| Quarter | 1 | 2 | 3 | 4 | Total |
|---|---|---|---|---|---|
| **Chargers** | 14 | 10 | 3 | 0 | **27** |
| Raiders | 7 | 0 | 7 | 0 | **14** |

at McAfee Coliseum, Oakland, California

- Date: October 16
- Game time: 1:15 p.m. PDT
- Game weather: 64 °F (18 °C), relative humidity 67%, wind 7 mph
- Game attendance: 52,666
- Referee: Tom White
- TV announcers (CBS): Gus Johnson and Steve Tasker
- Box score

Game information

**First quarter**

- SD – LaDainian Tomlinson 35-yard pass from Drew Brees (Nate Kaeding kick), 8:42. Chargers 7–0. **Drive: 7 plays, 70 yards, 3:48.**
- SD – LaDainian Tomlinson 7-yard run (Nate Kaeding kick), 4:02. Chargers 14–0. **Drive: 6 plays, 55 yards, 4:19.**
- OAK – LaMont Jordan 4-yard run (Sebastian Janikowski kick), 0:57. Chargers 14–7. **Drive: 8 plays, 66 yards, 3:05.**

**Second quarter**

- SD – Nate Kaeding 32-yard field goal, 10:25. Chargers 17–7. **Drive: 11 plays, 59 yards, 5:32.**
- SD – Justin Peelle 4-yard pass from LaDainian Tomlinson (Nate Kaeding kick), 2:39. Chargers 24–7. **Drive: 11 plays, 84 yards, 6:17.**

**Third quarter**

- SD – Nate Kaeding 33-yard field goal, 6:02. Chargers 27–7. **Drive: 6 plays, 41 yards, 2:56.**
- OAK – LaMont Jordan 1-yard run (Sebastian Janikowski kick), 0:34. Chargers 27–14. **Drive: 13 plays, 76 yards, 5:28.**

**Fourth quarter**

- No scoring plays.

**Top passers**

- SD – Drew Brees – 14/20, 164 yards, TD
- OAK – Kerry Collins – 24/48, 292 yards, INT

**Top rushers**

- SD – LaDainian Tomlinson – 31 rushes, 140 yards, TD
- OAK – LaMont Jordan – 12 rushes, 36 yards, 2 TD

**Top receivers**

- SD – LaDainian Tomlinson – 2 receptions, 39 yards, TD
- OAK – Doug Gabriel – 5 receptions, 84 yards

==== Week 7: at Philadelphia Eagles ====
Week 7: San Diego Chargers at Oakland Raiders – Game summary

| Quarter | 1 | 2 | 3 | 4 | Total |
|---|---|---|---|---|---|
| Chargers | 0 | 0 | 7 | 10 | **17** |
| **Eagles** | 0 | 7 | 3 | 10 | **20** |

at Lincoln Financial Field, Philadelphia, Pennsylvania

- Date: October 23
- Game time: 1:02 p.m. EDT
- Game weather: 53 °F (12 °C), relative humidity 45%, wind 17 mph
- Game attendance: 67,747
- Referee: Ron Winter
- TV announcers (CBS): Dick Enberg, Dan Dierdorf and Armen Keteyian
- Box score

Game information

**First quarter**

- No scoring plays.

**Second quarter**

- PHI – Terrell Owens 4-yard pass from Donovan McNabb (Todd France kick), 4:47. Eagles 7–0. **Drive: 13 plays, 76 yards, 5:28.**

**Third quarter**

- PHI – Todd France 23-yard field goal, 9:42. Eagles 10–0. **Drive: 13 plays, 76 yards, 5:28.**
- SD – Keenan McCardell 19-yard pass from Drew Brees (Nate Kaeding kick), 3:21. Eagles 10–7. **Drive: 6 plays, 41 yards, 2:56.**

**Fourth quarter**

- SD – Antonio Gates 8-yard pass from Drew Brees (Nate Kaeding kick), 13:48. Chargers 14–10. **Drive: 6 plays, 41 yards, 2:56.**
- S – Nate Kaeding 34-yard field goal, 9:21. Chargers 17–10. **Drive: 6 plays, 41 yards, 2:56.**
- PHI – Todd France 40-yard field goal, 6:24. Chargers 17–13. **Drive: 13 plays, 76 yards, 5:28.**
- PHI – Matt Ware 65-yard blocked field goal return (Todd France kick), 2:25. Eagles 20–17.

**Top passers**

- SD – Drew Brees – 23/40, 299 yards, 2 TD, 2 INT
- PHI – Donovan McNabb – 35/54, 287 yards, TD, 2 INT

**Top rushers**

- SD – Drew Brees – 1 rush, 9 yards
- PHI – Brian Westbrook – 10 rushes, 25 yards

**Top receivers**

- SD – Reche Caldwell – 4 receptions, 97 yards
- PHI – Brian Westbrook – 10 receptions, 75 yards

==== Week 8: vs. Kansas City Chiefs ====
Week 8: Kansas City Chiefs at San Diego Chargers – Game summary

| Quarter | 1 | 2 | 3 | 4 | Total |
|---|---|---|---|---|---|
| Chiefs | 0 | 3 | 7 | 10 | **20** |
| **Chargers** | 7 | 14 | 0 | 7 | **28** |

at Qualcomm Stadium, San Diego, California

- Date: October 30
- Game time: 1:05 p.m. PST
- Game weather: 73 °F (23 °C), relative humidity 64%, wind 8 mph
- Game attendance: 65,750
- Referee: Ed Hochuli
- TV announcers (CBS): Jim Nantz, Phil Simms and Bonnie Bernstein
- Box score

Game information

**First quarter**

- SDG – Antonio Gates 19-yard pass from Drew Brees (Nate Kaeding kick), 4:30. Chargers 7–0. **Drive: 9 plays, 81 yards, 4:03.**

**Second quarter**

- SD – Eric Parker 17-yard pass from LaDainian Tomlinson (Nate Kaeding kick), 14:56. Chargers 14–0. **Drive: 9 plays, 82 yards, 3:20.**
- KC – Lawrence Tynes 34-yard field goal, 1:56. Chargers 14–3. **Drive: 6 plays, 53 yards, 3:28.**
- SD – Antonio Gates 20-yard pass from Drew Brees (Nate Kaeding kick), 0:27. Chargers 21–3. **Drive: 5 plays, 74 yards, 1:29.**

**Third quarter**

- KC – Tony Gonzalez 16-yard pass from Trent Green (Lawrence Tynes kick), 6:45. Chargers 21–10. **Drive: 6 plays, 91 yards, 2:21.**

**Fourth quarter**

- KC – Lawrence Tynes 20-yard field goal, 12:00. Chargers 21–13. **Drive: 6 plays, 33 yards, 3:00.**
- SD – Antonio Gates 35-yard pass from Drew Brees (Nate Kaeding kick), 9:10. Chargers 28–13. **Drive: 5 plays, 53 yards, 2:50.**
- KC – Eddie Kennison 7-yard pass from Trent Green (Lawrence Tynes kick), 2:12. Chargers 28–20. **Drive: 7 plays, 64 yards, 1:37.**

**Top passers**

- KC– Trent Green – 31/43, 347 yards, 2 TD
- SD – Drew Brees – 25/43, 324 yards, 3 TD, INT

**Top rushers**

- KC – Larry Johnson – 6 rushes, 55 yards
- SD – LaDainian Tomlinson – 17 rushes, 69 yards

**Top receivers**

- KC – Eddie Kennison – 7 receptions, 115 yards, TD
- SD – Antonio Gates – 10 receptions, 145 yards, 3 TD

==== Week 9: at New York Jets ====
Week 9: San Diego Chargers at New York Jets – Game summary

| Quarter | 1 | 2 | 3 | 4 | Total |
|---|---|---|---|---|---|
| **Chargers** | 14 | 7 | 7 | 3 | **31** |
| Jets | 0 | 10 | 3 | 13 | **26** |

at Giants Stadium, East Rutherford, New Jersey

- Date: November 6
- Game time: 1:02 p.m. EST
- Game weather: 63 °F (17 °C), relative humidity 78%, wind 12 mph
- Game attendance: 77,662
- Referee: Walt Coleman
- TV announcers (CBS): Dick Enberg, Dan Dierdorf and Armen Keteyian
- Box score

Game information

**First quarter**

- SD– LaDainian Tomlinson 4-yard run (Nate Kaeding kick), 7:44. Chargers 7–0. **Drive: 7 plays, 59 yards, 3:50.**
- SD– LaDainian Tomlinson 25-yard pass from Drew Brees (Nate Kaeding kick), 2:21. Chargers 14–0. **Drive: 8 plays, 80 yards, 3:39.**

**Second quarter**

- NYJ – Curtis Martin 1-yard run (Mike Nugent kick), 14:57. Chargers 14–7. **Drive: 5 plays, 62 yards, 2:24.**
- SD– LaDainian Tomlinson 1-yard run (Nate Kaeding kick), 7:54. Chargers 21–7. **Drive: 10 plays, 75 yards, 7:03.**
- NYJ – Mike Nugent 35-yard field goal, 3:37. Chargers 21–10. **Drive: 8 plays, 43 yards, 4:17.**

**Third quarter**

- NYJ – Mike Nugent 22-yard field goal, 11:10. Chargers 21–13. **Drive: 4 plays, 43 yards, 2:16.**
- SD– LaDainian Tomlinson 1-yard run (Nate Kaeding kick), 3:51. Chargers 28–13. **Drive: 9 plays, 55 yards, 4:34.**

**Fourth quarter**

- NYJ – Jerald Sowell 5-yard pass from Brooks Bollinger (Mike Nugent kick), 12:27. Chargers 28–20. **Drive: 13 plays, 75 yards, 6:24.**
- SD Nate Kaeding 18-yard field goal, 8:35. Chargers 31–20. **Drive: 7 plays, 49 yards, 3:52.**
- NYJ – Laveranues Coles 8-yard pass from Brooks Bollinger (pass failed), 6:14. Chargers 31–26. **Drive: 7 plays, 48 yards, 2:21.**

**Top passers**

- SD– Drew Brees – 20/27, 270 yards, TD, INT
- NYJ – Brooks Bollinger – 11/20, 106 yards, 2 TD

**Top rushers**

- SD– LaDainian Tomlinson – 25 rushes, 107 yards, 3 TD
- NYJ – Curtis Martin – 21 rushes, 72 yards, TD

**Top receivers**

- SD– Antonio Gates – 8 receptions, 132 yards
- NYJ – Laveranues Coles – 6 receptions, 64 yards, TD

==== Week 11: vs. Buffalo Bills ====
Week 11: Buffalo Bills at San Diego Chargers – Game summary

| Quarter | 1 | 2 | 3 | 4 | Total |
|---|---|---|---|---|---|
| Bills | 3 | 7 | 0 | 0 | **10** |
| **Chargers** | 14 | 21 | 3 | 10 | **48** |

at Qualcomm Stadium, San Diego, California

- Date: November 20
- Game time: 1:15 p.m. PST
- Game weather: 78 °F (26 °C), relative humidity 33%, wind 10 mph
- Game attendance: 65,602
- Referee: Bill Leavy
- TV announcers (CBS): Gus Johnson, Steve Tasker and Scott Kaplan
- Box score

Game information

**First quarter**

- SD – LaDainian Tomlinson 1-yard run (Nate Kaeding kick), 9:31. Chargers 7–0. **Drive: 9 plays, 75 yards, 5:29.**
- BUF – Rian Lindell 53-yard field goal, 6:40. Chargers 7–3. **Drive: 6 plays, 12 yards, 2:51.**
- SD – Antonio Gates 27-yard pass from Drew Brees (Nate Kaeding kick), 0:32. Chargers 14–3. **Drive: 10 plays, 72 yards, 6:08.**

**Second quarter**

- SD – Eric Parker 23-yard pass from Drew Brees (Nate Kaeding kick), 7:22. Chargers 21–3. **Drive: 8 plays, 70 yards, 3:54.**
- SD – Lorenzo Neal 2-yard pass from Drew Brees (Nate Kaeding kick), 3:12. Chargers 28–3. **Drive: 6 plays, 22 yards, 3:56.**
- BUF – Daimon Shelton 3-yard pass from J. P. Losman (Rian Lindell kick), 1:23. Chargers 28–10. **Drive: 8 plays, 55 yards, 1:49.**
- SD – Keenan McCardell 29-yard pass from Drew Brees (Nate Kaeding kick), 0:37. Chargers 35–10. **Drive: 6 plays, 83 yards, 0:46.**

**Third quarter**

- SD – Nate Kaeding 28-yard field goal, 4:01. Chargers 38–10. **Drive: 11 plays, 75 yards, 6:31.**

**Fourth quarter**

- SD – Nate Kaeding 38-yard field goal, 14:14. Chargers 41–10. **Drive: 5 plays, 21 yards, 2:02.**
- SD – Michael Turner 8-yard run (Nate Kaeding kick), 4:06. Chargers 48–10. **Drive: 10 plays, 64 yards, 7:03.**

**Top passers**

- BUF – J. P. Losman – 20/36, 168 yards, TD, INT
- SD – Drew Brees – 28/33, 339 yards, 4 TD

**Top rushers**

- BUF – Willis McGahee – 4 rushes, 69 yards
- SD – LaDainian Tomlinson – 19 rushes, 67 yards, TD

**Top receivers**

- BUF – Lee Evans – 7 receptions, 115 yards, TD
- SD – Keenan McCardell – 6 receptions, 88 yards, TD

==== Week 12: at Washington Redskins ====
Week 12: San Diego Chargers at Washington Redskins – Game summary

| Quarter | 1 | 2 | 3 | 4 | OT | Total |
|---|---|---|---|---|---|---|
| **Chargers** | 0 | 7 | 0 | 10 | 6 | **23** |
| Redskins | 3 | 7 | 7 | 0 | 0 | **17** |

at FedExField, Summerfield, Maryland

- Date: November 27
- Game time: 1:02 p.m. EST
- Game weather: 52 °F (11 °C), relative humidity 61%, no wind
- Game attendance: 84,930
- Referee: Walt Anderson
- TV announcers (CBS): Kevin Harlan and Randy Cross
- Box score

Game information

**First quarter**

- WAS – John Hall 38-yard field goal, 5:22. Redskins 3–0. **Drive: 6 plays, 23 yards, 2:31.**

**Second quarter**

- SD – LaDainian Tomlinson 1-yard run (Nate Kaeding kick), 10:31. Chargers 7–3. **Drive: 8 plays, 57 yards, 3:47.**
- WAS – Santana Moss 22-yard pass from Mark Brunell (John Hall kick), 7:23. Redskins 10–7. **Drive: 7 plays, 69 yards, 3:08.**

**Third quarter**

- WAS – Rock Cartwright 13-yard run (John Hall kick), 3:14. Redskins 17–7. **Drive: 9 plays, 79 yards, 4:58.**

**Fourth quarter**

- SD – Nate Kaeding 48-yard field goal, 14:08. Redskins 17–10. **Drive: 11 plays, 47 yards, 4:06.**
- SD – LaDainian Tomlinson 32-yard run (Nate Kaeding kick), 3:29. Tied 17–17. **Drive: 3 plays, 67 yards, 1:07.**

**Overtime**

- SDG – LaDainian Tomlinson 41-yard run, 14:26. Chargers 23–17. **Drive: 2 plays, 65 yards, 0:34.**

**Top passers**

- SD – Drew Brees – 22/44, 215 yards, 3 INT
- WAS – Mark Brunell – 17/27, 194 yards, TD

**Top rushers**

- SD – LaDainian Tomlinson – 25 rushes, 184 yards, 3 TD
- WAS – Clinton Portis – 29 rushes, 87 yards

**Top receivers**

- SD – Eric Parker – 7 receptions, 98 yards
- WAS – Santana Moss – 6 receptions, 65 yards, TD

==== Week 13: vs. Oakland Raiders ====
Week 13: Oakland Raiders at San Diego Chargers – Game summary

| Quarter | 1 | 2 | 3 | 4 | Total |
|---|---|---|---|---|---|
| Raiders | 3 | 7 | 0 | 0 | **10** |
| **Chargers** | 3 | 14 | 7 | 10 | **34** |

at Qualcomm Stadium, San Diego, California

- Date: December 4
- Game time: 5:35 p.m. PST
- Game weather: 56 °F (13 °C), relative humidity 53%, wind 8 mph
- Game attendance: 66,436
- Referee: Bill Vinovich
- TV announcers (CBS): Mike Patrick, Joe Theismann, Paul Maguire and Suzy Kolber
- Box score

Game information

**First quarter**

- OAK – Sebastian Janikowski 37-yard field goal, 11:33. Raiders 3–0. **Drive: 9 plays, 48 yards, 3:27.**
- SD – Nate Kaeding 41-yard field goal, 8:49. Tied 3–3. **Drive: 9 plays, 37 yards, 2:44.**

**Second quarter**

- SD – Antonio Gates 6-yard pass from Drew Brees (Nate Kaeding kick), 11:14. Chargers 10–3. **Drive: 7 plays, 34 yards, 4:15.**
- OAK – Courtney Anderson 16-yard pass from Kerry Collins (Sebastian Janikowski kick), 6:59. Tied 10–10. **Drive: 8 plays, 67 yards, 4:15.**
- SD – Michael Turner 2-yard run (Nate Kaeding kick), 0:18. Chargers 17–10. **Drive: 13 plays, 72 yards, 6:41.**

**Third quarter**

- SD – Eric Parker 1-yard pass from Drew Brees (Nate Kaeding kick), 4:55. Chargers 24–10. **Drive: 13 plays, 57 yards, 7:32.**

**Fourth quarter**

- SD – Nate Kaeding 32-yard field goal, 13:33. Chargers 27–10. **Drive: 10 plays, 51 yards, 5:53.**
- SD – Clinton Hart 70-yard interception return (Nate Kaeding kick), 6:29. Chargers 34–10.

**Top passers**

- OAK – Kerry Collins – 22/40, 236 yards, TD, INT
- SD – Drew Brees – 17/22, 160 yards, 2 TD

**Top rushers**

- OAK – LaMont Jordan – 15 rushes, 55 yards
- SD – LaDainian Tomlinson – 25 rushes, 86 yards

**Top receivers**

- OAK – Randy Moss – 7 receptions, 74 yards
- SD – Keenan McCardell – 4 receptions, 60 yards

==== Week 14: vs. Miami Dolphins ====
Week 14: Miami Dolphins at San Diego Chargers – Game summary

| Quarter | 1 | 2 | 3 | 4 | Total |
|---|---|---|---|---|---|
| **Dolphins** | 0 | 3 | 17 | 3 | **23** |
| Chargers | 7 | 0 | 0 | 14 | **21** |

at Qualcomm Stadium, San Diego, California

- Date: December 11
- Game time: 1:15 p.m. PST
- Game weather: 69 °F (21 °C), relative humidity 23%, wind 8 mph
- Game attendance: 65,026
- Referee: Tony Corrente
- TV announcers (CBS): Gus Johnson, Steve Tasker and Scott Kaplan
- Box score

Game information

**First quarter**

- SD – Keenan McCardell 8-yard pass from Drew Brees (Nate Kaeding kick), 2:40. Chargers 7–0. **Drive: 15 plays, 62 yards, 7:44.**

**Second quarter**

- MIA – Olindo Mare 29-yard field goal, 3:39. Chargers 7–3. **Drive: 9 plays, 57 yards, 3:59.**

**Third quarter**

- MIA – Olindo Mare 39-yard field goal, 11:43. Chargers 7–6. **Drive: 8 plays, 53 yards, 3:17.**
- MIA – Chris Chambers 8-yard pass from Gus Frerotte (Olindo Mare kick), 10:35. Dolphins 13–7. **Drive: 3 plays, 24 yards, 1:01.**
- MIA – Chris Chambers 35-yard pass from Gus Frerotte (Olindo Mare kick), 3:26. Dolphins 20–7. **Drive: 6 plays, 87 yards, 2:51.**

**Fourth quarter**

- SD – Drew Brees 4-yard run (Nate Kaeding kick), 10:34. Dolphins 20–14. **Drive: 13 plays, 73 yards, 7:52.**
- MIA – Olindo Mare 20-yard field goal, 1:11. Dolphins 23–14. **Drive: 7 plays, 21 yards, 1:20.**
- SD – Antonio Gates 8-yard pass from Drew Brees (Nate Kaeding kick), 0:15. Dolphins 23–21. **Drive: 8 plays, 56 yards, 0:56.**

**Top passers**

- MIA – Gus Frerotte – 14/22, 229 yards, 2 TD
- SD – Drew Brees – 35/52, 279 yards, 2 TD, INT

**Top rushers**

- MIA – Ronnie Brown – 11 rushes, 30 yards
- SD – LaDainian Tomlinson – 21 rushes, 75 yards

**Top receivers**

- MIA – Chris Chambers – 8 receptions, 121 yards, 2 TD
- SD– Antonio Gates – 13 receptions, 123 yards, TD

==== Week 15: at Indianapolis Colts ====
Week 12: San Diego Chargers at Indianapolis Colts – Game summary

| Quarter | 1 | 2 | 3 | 4 | Total |
|---|---|---|---|---|---|
| **Chargers** | 10 | 3 | 3 | 10 | **26** |
| Colts | 0 | 0 | 17 | 0 | **17** |

at RCA Dome, Indianapolis, Indiana

- Date: December 18
- Game time: 1:02 p.m. EST
- Game weather: N/A (game played indoors)
- Game attendance: 57,389
- Referee: Terry McAulay
- TV announcers (CBS): Dick Enberg, Dan Dierdorf and Armen Keteyian
- Box score

Game information

**First quarter**

- SD – Keenan McCardell 29-yard pass from Drew Brees (Nate Kaeding kick), 9:13. Chargers 7–0. **Drive: 5 plays, 42 yards, 1:50.**
- SD – Nate Kaeding 36-yard field goal, 1:56. Chargers 10–0. **Drive: 8 plays, 64 yards, 4:20.**

**Second quarter**

- SD – Nate Kaeding 20-yard field goal, 0:15. Chargers 13–0. **Drive: 18 plays, 91 yards, 8:18.**

**Third quarter**

- SD – Nate Kaeding 48-yard field goal, 9:30. Chargers 16–0. **Drive: 10 plays, 40 yards, 4:19.**
- IND – Mike Vanderjagt 32-yard field goal, 6:41. Chargers 16–3. **Drive: 9 plays, 56 yards, 2:49.**
- IND – Edgerrin James 1-yard run (Mike Vanderjagt kick), 3:42. Chargers 16–10. **Drive: 2 plays, 26 yards, 0:52.**
- IND – Dallas Clark 1-yard pass from Peyton Manning (Mike Vanderjagt kick), 0:40. Colts 17–16. **Drive: 3 plays, 4 yards, 0:47.**

**Fourth quarter**

- SD – Nate Kaeding 49-yard field goal, 6:41. Chargers 19–17. **Drive: 7 plays, 61 yards, 3:28.**
- SD – Michael Turner 83-yard run (Nate Kaeding kick), 2:09. Chargers 26–17. **Drive: 2 plays, 80 yards, 0:19.**

**Top passers**

- SD – Drew Brees – 22/33, 255 yards, TD, 2 INT
- IND – Peyton Manning – 26/45, 336 yards, TD, 2 INT

**Top rushers**

- SD – Michael Turner – 8 rushes, 113 yards, TD
- IND – Edgerrin James – 13 rushes, 25 yards, TD

**Top receivers**

- SD – Keenan McCardell – 3 receptions, 88 yards, TD
- IND – Marvin Harrison – 8 receptions, 135 yards

==== Week 16: at Kansas City Chiefs ====
Week 16: San Diego Chargers at Kansas City Chiefs – Game summary

| Quarter | 1 | 2 | 3 | 4 | Total |
|---|---|---|---|---|---|
| Chargers | 7 | 0 | 0 | 0 | **7** |
| **Chiefs** | 7 | 13 | 0 | 0 | **20** |

at Arrowhead Stadium, Kansas City, Missouri

- Date: December 24
- Game time: 12:00 p.m. CST
- Game weather: 42 °F (6 °C), relative humidity 89%, wind 10 mph
- Game attendance: 75,956
- Referee: Mike Carey
- TV announcers (CBS): Kevin Harlan and Randy Cross
- Box score

Game information

**First quarter**

- KC – Larry Johnson 4-yard run (Lawrence Tynes kick), 9:28. Chiefs 7–0. **Drive: 6 plays, 43 yards, 2:58.**
- SD – Antonio Gates 18-yard pass from Drew Brees (Nate Kaeding kick), 4:06. Tied 7–7. **Drive: 10 plays, 75 yards, 5:22.**

**Second quarter**

- KC – Samie Parker 42-yard pass from Trent Green (Lawrence Tynes kick), 14:53. Chiefs 14–7. **Drive: 8 plays, 67 yards, 4:13.**
- KC – Larry Johnson 28-yard pass from Trent Green (kick failed), 1:45. Chiefs 20–7. **Drive: 6 plays, 57 yards, 2:37.**

**Third quarter**

- No scoring plays.

**Fourth quarter**

- No scoring plays.

**Top passers**

- SD – Drew Brees – 18/33, 161 yards, TD, INT
- KC – Trent Green – 19/35, 207 yards, 2 TD

**Top rushers**

- SD – LaDainian Tomlinson – 14 rushes, 47 yards
- KC – Larry Johnson – 32 rushes, 131 yards, TD

**Top receivers**

- SD – Keenan McCardell – 6 receptions, 58 yards
- KC – Tony Gonzalez – 5 receptions, 58 yards
  KAN – Samie Parker – 4 receptions, 58 yards, TD

==== Week 17: vs. Denver Broncos ====
Week 17: Denver Broncos at San Diego Chargers – Game summary

| Quarter | 1 | 2 | 3 | 4 | Total |
|---|---|---|---|---|---|
| **Broncos** | 0 | 14 | 2 | 7 | **23** |
| Chargers | 0 | 7 | 0 | 0 | **7** |

at Qualcomm Stadium, San Diego, California

- Date: December 31
- Game time: 1:35 p.m. PST
- Game weather: 61 °F (16 °C), relative humidity 63%, wind 8 mph
- Game attendance: 65,513
- Referee: Scott Green
- TV announcers (CBS): Jim Nantz, Phil Simms and Bonnie Bernstein
- Box score

Game information

**First quarter**

- No scoring plays.

**Second quarter**

- DEN – Tatum Bell 6-yard run (Jason Elam kick), 11:48. Broncos 7–0. **Drive: 12 plays, 57 yards, 5:16.**
- DEN – Tatum Bell 1-yard run (Jason Elam kick), 3:24. Broncos 14–0. **Drive: 12 plays, 57 yards, 5:16.**
- SD – LaDainian Tomlinson 6-yard run (Nate Kaeding kick), 0:38. Broncos 14–7. **Drive: 11 plays, 80 yards, 5:45.**

**Third quarter**

- DEN – Safety, Demetrin Veal tackled Shane Olivea in end zone, 5:30. Broncos 16–7.

**Fourth quarter**

- DEN – Tatum Bell 19-yard run (Jason Elam kick), 4:32. Broncos 23–7. **Drive: 12 plays, 57 yards, 5:16.**

**Top passers**

- DEN – Jake Plummer – 8/14, 91 yards
- SD – Philip Rivers – 12/22, 115 yards, INT

**Top rushers**

- DEN – Ron Dayne – 13 rushes, 64 yards
- SD – LaDainian Tomlinson – 19 rushes, 92 yards, TD

**Top receivers**

- DEN – Kyle Johnson – 2 receptions, 27 yards
- SD – Eric Parker – 8 receptions, 87 yards

=== Standings ===
AFC West
| | W | L | T | PCT | DIV | CONF | PF | PA | STK |
|---|---|---|---|---|---|---|---|---|---|
| ^{(2)} Denver Broncos | 13 | 3 | 0 | .813 | 5–1 | 10–2 | 395 | 258 | W4 |
| Kansas City Chiefs | 10 | 6 | 0 | .625 | 4–2 | 9–3 | 403 | 325 | W2 |
| San Diego Chargers | 9 | 7 | 0 | .563 | 3–3 | 7–5 | 418 | 312 | L2 |
| Oakland Raiders | 4 | 12 | 0 | .250 | 0–6 | 2–10 | 290 | 383 | L6 |

== Awards ==
Six Chargers were named to the 2006 Pro Bowl, and four were named first or second team Associated Press (AP) All-Pros. Merriman won the AP NFL Defensive Rookie of the Year with 28 1/2 of the 50 available votes.

| Player | Position | Pro Bowl starter | Pro Bowl reserve | AP 1st team All-Pro | AP 2nd team All-Pro |
|---|---|---|---|---|---|
| Antonio Gates | Tight end | Yes | | Yes | |
| Shawne Merriman | Linebacker | Yes | | | |
| Hanik Milligan | Special teams | Yes | | | |
| Lorenzo Neal | Fullback | Yes | | | Yes |
| LaDainian Tomlinson | Running back | | Yes | | Yes |
| Jamal Williams | Nose tackle | Yes | | Yes | |
