= Eric Parker (American football) =

American football player (born 1979)

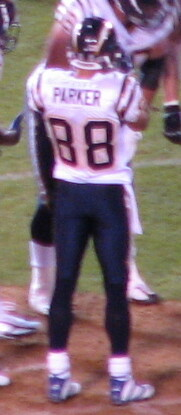
- Parker with the Chargers in 2006

No. 88
- Position: Wide receiver

Personal information
- Born: April 14, 1979 (age 47); Shorewood, Illinois, U.S.
- Listed height: 6 ft 0 in (1.83 m)
- Listed weight: 180 lb (82 kg)

Career information
- College: Tennessee
- NFL draft: 2002: undrafted

Career history
- Houston Texans (2002)*; San Diego Chargers (2002–2007)
- * Offseason or practice squad member only

Awards and highlights
- BCS national champion (1998)

Career NFL statistics
- Receptions: 187
- Receiving yards: 2,586
- Receiving touchdowns: 11
- Stats at Pro Football Reference

Eric Samuel Parker (born April 14, 1979) is an American former professional football player who was a wide receiver in the National Football League (NFL). He played college football for the Tennessee Volunteers and was signed by the Houston Texans as an undrafted free agent in 2002.

Parker spent the first six seasons of his career with the San Diego Chargers.

== Early life ==
Parker attended Joliet West High School in Joliet, Illinois.

== College career ==
Parker attended the University of Tennessee after graduating from Joliet West.

== Professional career ==
=== Houston Texans ===
Coming out of college, Parker was labeled as injury-prone and thus was passed over in the draft. He was originally signed by the Houston Texans as an undrafted free agent, but was released by in July.

=== San Diego Chargers ===
Shortly after his release from the Texans, Parker was signed by the San Diego Chargers. He spent some time on the practice squad and eventually made the active roster in late 2002.

Parker had a productive campaign in 2003 before a shoulder injury cut his season short. His best season was in 2005 when he caught 57 passes for 725 yards. During the 2006 offseason, the Chargers signed Parker to a new five-year deal.

In 2006, Parker and then #1 wide receiver Keenan McCardell both ended the season with zero touchdown catches. Teammates LaDainian Tomlinson, tight end Antonio Gates and wide receiver Vincent Jackson accounted for the majority of the Chargers' scores.

Parker's 2006 season came to a disappointing end in the Divisional Round of the playoffs. In a game the Chargers lost to the New England Patriots by three points, Parker dropped two passes and fumbled a crucial third-quarter punt, which led to three points for the opposing team.

In 2007, Eric Parker injured his toe during training camp. This led to the Chargers putting him on season-ending injured reserve. He was released by the team on July 23, 2008.

In March 2009, Eric Parker joined the coaching staff of the San Diego Chargers as a wide receivers and conditioning assistant. He also coaches track at Helix Charter High School.

== NFL career statistics ==
Legend
**Bold**	Career high

=== Regular season ===
Year	Team	Games		Receiving					
Year	Team	GP	GS	Tgt	Rec	Yds	Avg	Lng	TD
2002	SDG	9	2	30	17	268	**15.8**	31	1
2003	SDG	8	4	31	18	244	13.6	33	3
2004	SDG	**15**	**13**	71	47	690	14.7	**79**	**4**
2005	SDG	**15**	9	**80**	**57**	**725**	12.7	49	3
2006	SDG	**15**	12	70	48	659	13.7	38	0
Career		62	40	282	187	2,586	13.8	79	11

=== Playoffs ===
Year	Team	Games		Receiving					
Year	Team	GP	GS	Tgt	Rec	Yds	Avg	Lng	TD
2004	SDG	**1**	**1**	**11**	**9**	**93**	10.3	16	0
2006	SDG	**1**	**1**	7	2	42	**21.0**	**21**	0
Career		2	2	18	11	135	12.3	21	0
