= Terrence Kiel =

American football player (1980–2008)

No. 48
- Position: Safety

Personal information
- Born: November 24, 1980; Lufkin, Texas, U.S.
- Died: July 4, 2008 (aged 27); San Diego, California, U.S.
- Listed height: 5 ft 11 in (1.80 m)
- Listed weight: 207 lb (94 kg)

Career information
- High school: Lufkin
- College: Texas A&M
- NFL draft: 2003: 2nd round, 62nd overall pick

Career history
- San Diego Chargers (2003–2006)

Career NFL statistics
- Total tackles: 278
- Sacks: 2
- Forced fumbles: 2
- Fumble recoveries: 3
- Interceptions: 4
- Stats at Pro Football Reference

Terrence Dewayne Kiel (November 24, 1980 – July 4, 2008) was an American professional football player who spent his entire career as a safety for the San Diego Chargers of the National Football League (NFL) from 2003 to 2006. He played college football for the Texas A&M Aggies and was selected by the Chargers in the second round of the 2003 NFL draft.

== Early life ==
Kiel was born in Lufkin, Texas. As a senior at Lufkin High School, he posted 115 tackles, five interceptions, and three recovered fumbles. He scored four returning touchdowns, including three on punt returns. He also blocked five kick attempts, including three PATs. He received Class 5A all-state mention honors for his efforts.

== College career ==
Kiel played college football at Texas A&M University from 1999 to 2002. In his freshman year, he played in 11 games, posting nine tackles, including seven solo. As a sophomore, he started in 10 of 11 games, making 57 tackles (41 solo). He also defended six passes and tied for the team lead with his four interceptions. For that season, he received honorable mention All-Big 12 honors by the Associated Press. As a junior, he started in all 12 games, posting 92 total tackles, including a team-high of 65 solo hits. He recorded one interception and broke five passes. He also had four games where he posted double-digit tackles. In his senior year, he received all-Big 12 honorable mention honors by the league's coaches and Associated Press after posting a team-high of 95 tackles. In the same season, he helped the team upset then-#1 Oklahoma by intercepting the Sooners' final pass of the game.

== Professional career ==
Pre-draft measurables
Height	Weight	Arm length	Hand span	40-yard dash	10-yard split	20-yard split	20-yard shuttle	Three-cone drill	Vertical jump	Broad jump	Bench press
5 ft 11 1/8 in (1.81 m)	204 lb (93 kg)	30 5/8 in (0.78 m)	10 5/8 in (0.27 m)	4.50 s	1.57 s	2.63 s	3.96 s	6.88 s	38 in (0.97 m)	10 ft 7 in (3.23 m)	16 reps
All values from NFL Combine

Kiel was selected by the San Diego Chargers with the 62nd overall pick, in the second round in the 2003 NFL draft. Over his four seasons with the Chargers, he played in 59 games and started 51. He posted 278 tackles, 2 sacks, 4 interceptions, and 2 forced fumbles. He was cut on March 1, 2007, and was declared a free agent the following day.

== NFL career statistics ==
Legend
**Bold**	Career high

=== Regular season ===
Year	Team	Games		Tackles					Interceptions					Fumbles			
Year	Team	GP	GS	Cmb	Solo	Ast	Sck	TFL	Int	Yds	TD	Lng	PD	FF	FR	Yds	TD
2003	SDG	**16**	8	68	59	9	0.0	1	**2**	15	0	15	4	0	0	0	0
2004	SDG	**16**	**16**	**97**	**72**	**25**	**1.0**	**3**	**2**	**31**	0	**31**	**10**	0	**1**	0	0
2005	SDG	12	12	59	49	10	**1.0**	1	0	0	0	0	6	**1**	**1**	0	0
2006	SDG	15	15	54	38	16	0.0	2	0	0	0	0	2	**1**	**1**	**6**	0
		59	51	278	218	60	2.0	7	4	46	0	31	22	2	3	6	0

=== Playoffs ===
Year	Team	Games		Tackles					Interceptions					Fumbles			
Year	Team	GP	GS	Cmb	Solo	Ast	Sck	TFL	Int	Yds	TD	Lng	PD	FF	FR	Yds	TD
2004	SDG	**1**	**1**	3	2	**1**	0.0	**1**	0	0	0	0	**2**	0	0	0	0
2006	SDG	**1**	**1**	**6**	**6**	0	0.0	0	0	0	0	0	0	**1**	0	0	0
		2	2	9	8	1	0.0	1	0	0	0	0	2	1	0	0	0

== Off-the-field problems ==
In July 2003, Kiel was shot three times during an alleged attempted carjacking incident at a southwest Houston mall parking lot. The assailant, described as a man in his young teens or early 20s, fled the scene. None of Kiel's injuries were serious and he was shortly released by the hospital.

In September 2006, Kiel was arrested for multiple drug charges including possession, possession with the intent to sell, and transportation of a controlled substance. Police came to the Chargers practice facility and arrested him. He was released after posting a $1,550,000 bond.

In January 2007, he was cited for publicly urinating outside a San Diego nightclub, but the city dropped the charge. In February 2007, he pleaded guilty to felony and misdemeanor drug charges for shipping codeine-based cough syrup to Texas. He was released by the Chargers after his plea and was sentenced to three years of probation. The felony charge was dropped after he volunteered for 175 hours and underwent counseling for gambling.

== Death ==
On July 4, 2008, San Diego police reported that Kiel had died in a car crash. He was driving back home from a party thrown by Chargers player Stephen Cooper when his 2004 Chevrolet Monte Carlo hit a wall and he was thrown from the car.

The autopsy report stated that Kiel died due to mechanical asphyxia. His funeral was held in his hometown, Lufkin, Texas.

== Personal life ==
Kiel's son, Terrence II, currently plays baseball for Texas A&M.
