= Justin Peelle =

American football player and coach (born 1979)

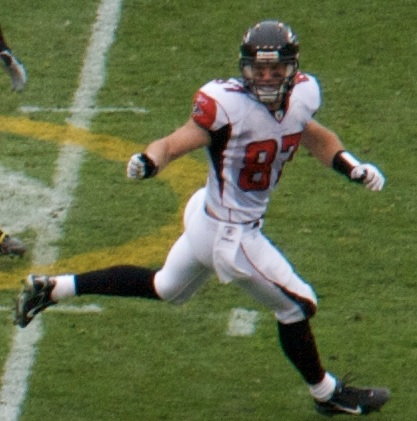
- Peelle with the Atlanta Falcons in 2008

Tampa Bay Buccaneers
- Title: Tight ends coach

Personal information
- Born: March 15, 1979 (age 47); Fresno, California, U.S.
- Listed height: 6 ft 4 in (1.93 m)
- Listed weight: 251 lb (114 kg)

Career information
- Position: Tight end (No. 84, 87, 81)
- High school: Dublin (CA)
- College: Oregon (1997–2001)
- NFL draft: 2002: 4th round, 103rd overall pick

Career history

Playing
- San Diego Chargers (2002–2005); Miami Dolphins (2006–2007); Atlanta Falcons (2008–2010); San Francisco 49ers (2011); Pittsburgh Steelers (2012)*
- * Offseason or practice squad member only

Coaching
- Philadelphia Eagles (2013–2014) Assistant tight ends coach; Philadelphia Eagles (2015–2020) Tight ends coach; Atlanta Falcons (2021–2023) Tight ends coach; Tampa Bay Buccaneers (2024−present) Tight ends coach

Awards and highlights
- As player: First-team All-Pac-10 (2001); As coach: Super Bowl champion (LII)

Career NFL statistics
- Receptions: 123
- Receiving yards: 1,003
- Receiving average: 8.2
- Receiving touchdowns: 12
- Stats at Pro Football Reference

Justin Morris Peelle (born March 15, 1979) is an American former professional football tight end and coach who is the tight ends coach for the Tampa Bay Buccaneers of the National Football League (NFL).

After playing college football for Oregon, he was drafted by the San Diego Chargers in the fourth round of the 2002 NFL draft. He played for the Chargers for four seasons from 2002 to 2005, the Miami Dolphins from 2006 to 2007, the Atlanta Falcons from 2008 to 2010, and the San Francisco 49ers in 2011. He became an assistant tight ends coach for the Philadelphia Eagles in 2013 before he was promoted to tight ends coach in 2015.

== Early life ==
Peelle played high school football at Dublin High School.

== College career ==
Peelle started 28 of the 42 games in which he played during his four seasons at the University of Oregon (1998–2001). During that time he played alongside the former Atlanta Falcons quarterback Joey Harrington. He was an honorable mention all-conference pick as a junior when he registered 24 receptions for 388 yards and five scores. He was a first-team All-Pac-10 selection as a senior when he caught 34 passes for 491 yards and nine touchdowns. The same year, he was also a semifinalist for the Mackey Award, given to the nation's top tight end.

In his collegiate career, he totaled 63 receptions for 944 yards and 14 touchdowns. He was also an All-Pac-10 Academic choice all four years.

== Professional career ==
Pre-draft measurables
Height	Weight	Arm length	Hand span	40-yard dash	10-yard split	20-yard split	20-yard shuttle	Three-cone drill	Vertical jump	Broad jump	Bench press
6 ft 4 3/8 in (1.94 m)	255 lb (116 kg)	32 3/4 in (0.83 m)	10 in (0.25 m)	4.75 s	1.70 s	2.74 s	4.29 s	7.34 s	29 in (0.74 m)	9 ft 2 in (2.79 m)	21 reps
Values are from the NFL Scouting Combine.

=== San Diego Chargers ===
Peelle began his professional career in 2002, when he was a fourth-round selection (103rd overall) by the San Diego Chargers and their general manager John Butler in the 2002 NFL draft. He played in 15 games his rookie season, including two starts. On the year, he caught three passes for 15 yards. Peelle was also fifth on the squad with seven tackles on special teams. His first NFL reception came on a two-yard pass from quarterback Drew Brees against the San Francisco 49ers on November 17.

Peelle started nine of the 15 games in which he appeared in 2003. He tallied a career-high 16 receptions for 133 yards on the season, and had one touchdown catch on the year. Peelle also contributed two tackles on special teams. He posted a career-high four catches, totaling 24 yards, against the Baltimore Ravens on September 21. His lone scoring catch of the year came on a seven-yard grab from Brees in the back of the end zone the following week at the Oakland Raiders, marking his first NFL touchdown reception. He was inactive for game at the Detroit Lions on December 7 with a concussion sustained the previous week against the Kansas City Chiefs.

Peelle started four of 16 contests in which he appeared in 2004. He totaled 10 receptions for 84 yards and a pair of scores on the season and recorded four stops on special teams. His first reception of season came on a 10-yard touchdown pass from Brees in 38–17 win over the Tennessee Titans on October 3. Peelle tallied his longest scoring reception of his NFL career in a 42–14 victory over the Raiders on October 31 with a 17-yard grab from Brees. Peelle had three receptions for a career-best 34 yards in first-round playoff game against the New York Jets on January 8, 2005.

Peelle played in all 16 games in 2005, including four starts in what would be his final season with the Chargers. He caught 11 passes for 38 yards and a touchdown on the year while collecting two special teams tackles. He had his most productive day of season at the Raiders on October 16 when he caught three passes for 20 yards, including a four-yard touchdown reception from running back LaDainian Tomlinson in the Chargers’ 27–14 victory.

=== Miami Dolphins ===
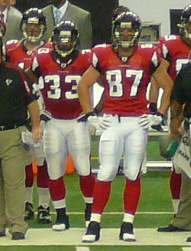
Peelle (right) with Michael Turner (left)

The Miami Dolphins signed Peelle as an unrestricted free agent on March 20, 2006. Peelle signed a three-year deal with the team which included base salaries of $600,000 (2006), $1.2 million (2007), and $1.3 million (2008).

Peelle appeared in 15 games for the Dolphins in 2006, including a career-high ten starts. This was due to the team's increased use of two-tight end sets, which created more time for Peelle and less for fullback Darian Barnes. He finished with 16 catches for 116 yards and one touchdown on the season, marking the fourth consecutive season he had at least one touchdown catch. He was inactive once (on October 15 at the New York Jets) with a knee injury, allowing tight end Jason Rader to make the first start of his career. On November 19 against the Minnesota Vikings, Peelle had three catches for 21 yards and one touchdown, coming on an 11-yard pass from former Oregon teammate Joey Harrington. It was his first touchdown catch as a member of the Dolphins.

On August 30, 2008, Peelle was released by the Dolphins during final cuts.

=== Atlanta Falcons ===
Peelle was signed by the Atlanta Falcons on September 1, 2008. The team released tight end Jason Rader to make room for Peelle on the roster. Peelle was named the starting tight end after Ben Hartsock was placed on injured reserve. Peelle has made a great impact on the Falcons as a great receiving tight end. He helped the Falcons clinch a playoff berth for the first time since 2004. The Falcons re-signed him on February 26, 2009.

On August 18, 2011, he was released with an injury settlement.

=== San Francisco 49ers ===
The San Francisco 49ers signed Peelle on September 13, 2011. During the 2011 season, he typically played in multiple-tight-end sets backing up Vernon Davis. On November 20, 2011, against the Arizona Cardinals, after injuries to other players, Peelle also played fullback.

=== Pittsburgh Steelers ===
The Pittsburgh Steelers signed Peelle on August 13, 2012, but he was released during final roster cuts on August 27, 2012.

== NFL career statistics ==
Legend
**Bold**	Career high

=== Regular season ===
Year	Team	Games		Receiving					
Year	Team	GP	GS	Tgt	Rec	Yds	Avg	Lng	TD
2002	SDG	15	2	7	3	15	5.0	10	0
2003	SDG	15	9	25	16	133	8.3	24	1
2004	SDG	**16**	4	20	10	84	8.4	17	**2**
2005	SDG	**16**	4	20	11	38	3.5	11	1
2006	MIA	15	10	18	16	116	7.3	25	1
2007	MIA	**16**	10	**47**	**29**	**228**	7.9	**35**	**2**
2008	ATL	**16**	**11**	23	15	159	10.6	18	**2**
2009	ATL	15	8	15	12	115	9.6	32	**2**
2010	ATL	13	8	15	10	96	9.6	15	1
2011	SFO	14	2	4	1	19	**19.0**	19	0
		151	68	194	123	1,003	8.2	35	12

=== Playoffs ===
Year	Team	Games		Receiving					
Year	Team	GP	GS	Tgt	Rec	Yds	Avg	Lng	TD
2004	SDG	1	**1**	**4**	**3**	**34**	**11.3**	**20**	0
2008	ATL	1	**1**	3	**3**	11	3.7	6	**1**
2010	ATL	1	0	0	0	0	0.0	0	0
2011	SFO	**2**	**1**	1	1	4	4.0	4	0
		5	3	8	7	49	7.0	20	1

== Coaching career ==
On February 8, 2013, Peelle was hired by new coach Chip Kelly to serve as the Philadelphia Eagles' assistant tight ends coach. On January 26, 2015, he was promoted to tight ends coach. He was retained under new head coach Doug Pederson as tight ends coach on January 20, 2016. Peelle won his first Super Bowl ring when the Eagles defeated the New England Patriots in Super Bowl LII 41–33. On March 20, 2024, he was named tight ends coach of the Tampa Bay Buccaneers.

== Personal life ==
Justin has a wife named Sara and a son named Morris David. He graduated from the University of Oregon with a degree in political science.

Peelle maintained his offseason in San Diego during his playing career.
