= Sammy Davis (American football) =

American football player (born 1980)

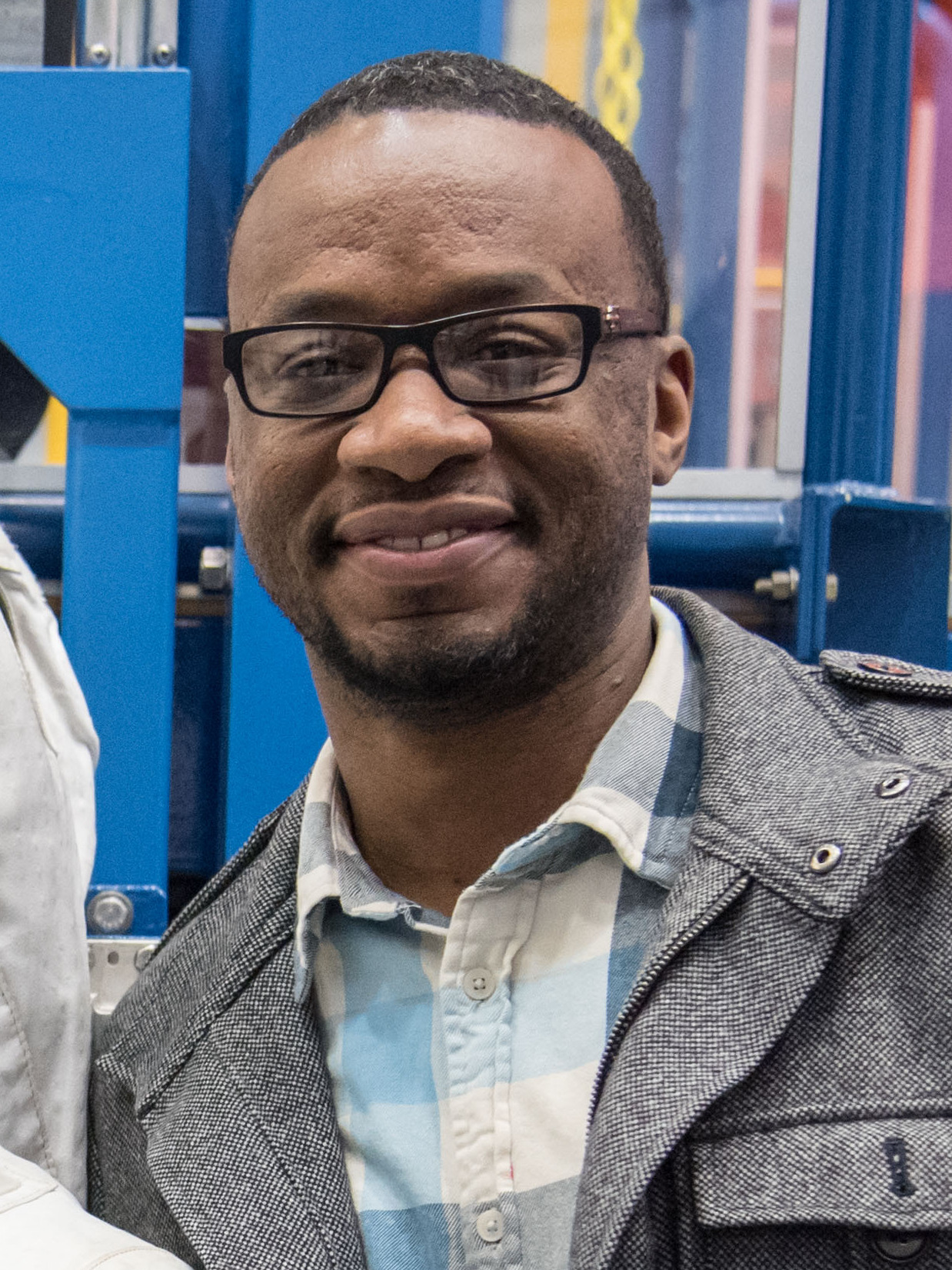
- Davis in 2017

No. 22, 31
- Position: Cornerback

Personal information
- Born: April 8, 1980 (age 46); Humble, Texas, U.S.
- Listed height: 6 ft 1 in (1.85 m)
- Listed weight: 195 lb (88 kg)

Career information
- High school: Humble (TX)
- College: Texas A&M
- NFL draft: 2003: 1st round, 30th overall pick

Career history
- San Diego Chargers (2003–2005); San Francisco 49ers (2006); Tampa Bay Buccaneers (2007)

Awards and highlights
- First-team All-Big 12 (2001)

Career NFL statistics
- Total tackles: 179
- Sacks: 1
- Forced fumbles: 1
- Pass deflections: 31
- Interceptions: 3
- Stats at Pro Football Reference

Sammy J. Davis Jr. (born April 8, 1980) is an American former professional football player who was a cornerback in the National Football League (NFL). He was selected by the San Diego Chargers in the first round, with the 30th overall pick, of the 2003 NFL draft. He played college football at Texas A&M. Davis also played for the San Francisco 49ers and Tampa Bay Buccaneers.

== Early life ==
Davis played high school football at Humble High School in Humble, Texas, earning Super Prep All-American honors.

== College career ==
Davis played college football for the Texas A&M Aggies from 1999 to 2002, recording 11 career interceptions. He garnered first-team All-Big 12 Conference recognition his junior year in 2001. He majored in agriculture and life sciences at Texas A&M.

== Professional career ==
Davis was selected by the San Diego Chargers in the first round, with the 30th overall pick, of the 2003 NFL draft. He officially signed with the team on July 23, 2003. He started all 16 games his rookie year in 2003, recording 45 solo tackles, 13 assisted tackles, two interceptions and 10 pass breakups. Davis appeared in 12 games, with 10 starts, during the 2004 season, totaling 32 solo tackles, six assisted tackles, one interception and 10 pass breakups. He played in 16 games, starting four, for the Chargers in 2005, accumulating 25 solo tackles, three assisted tackles, one sack, one forced fumble and three pass breakups.

On April 13, 2006, Davis was traded to the San Francisco 49ers for Rashaun Woods. He appeared in 13 games, starting one, in 2006, recording 23 solo tackles, seven tackles and seven pass breakups. He was placed on injured reserve on December 12, 2006. Davis was released by the 49ers on February 26, 2007.

Davis signed with the Tampa Bay Buccaneers on March 13, 2007. He was released on September 2 but re-signed on September 11, 2007. He played in 14 games, starting one, during the 2007 season, totaling 22 solo tackles, three assisted tackles and one pass breakup. Davis re-signed with the Buccaneers on March 6, 2008. He was placed on injured reserve on August 26 and released on August 30, 2008.

During his NFL career, Davis was involved in the development of a system that allowed football players to drink water while on the playing field, utilizing water pouches stored under the shoulder pads.

== NFL career statistics ==
Legend
**Bold**	Career high

Year	Team	Games		Tackles					Interceptions					Fumbles			
Year	Team	GP	GS	Cmb	Solo	Ast	Sck	TFL	Int	Yds	TD	Lng	PD	FF	FR	Yds	TD
2003	SDG	**16**	**16**	**58**	**45**	**13**	0.0	1	**2**	**48**	0	**41**	**10**	0	0	0	0
2004	SDG	12	10	38	32	6	0.0	0	1	4	0	4	**10**	0	0	0	0
2005	SDG	**16**	4	28	25	3	**1.0**	**2**	0	0	0	0	3	**1**	0	0	0
2006	SFO	13	1	30	23	7	0.0	0	0	0	0	0	7	0	0	0	0
2007	TAM	14	1	25	22	3	0.0	1	0	0	0	0	1	0	0	0	0
		71	32	179	147	32	1.0	4	3	52	0	41	31	1	0	0	0

== Post-football career ==
Davis was owner of the Austin Capitals, an American Basketball Association franchise.
