= Jesse Chatman =

American football player (born 1979)

No. 22, 24, 28
- Position: Running back

Personal information
- Born: September 22, 1979 (age 47); Houston, Texas, U.S.
- Listed height: 5 ft 8 in (1.73 m)
- Listed weight: 215 lb (98 kg)

Career information
- High school: Franklin (WA)
- College: Eastern Washington
- NFL draft: 2002: undrafted

Career history
- San Diego Chargers (2002–2004); Miami Dolphins (2005); New Orleans Saints (2005); Miami Dolphins (2007); New York Jets (2008); Virginia Destroyers (2011)

Awards and highlights
- I-AA All-American (2001); Big Sky Offensive Player of Year (2001); First-team All-Big Sky (2001)

Career NFL statistics
- Rushing attempts: 212
- Rushing yards: 951
- Rushing touchdowns: 4
- Receptions: 39
- Receiving yards: 281
- Stats at Pro Football Reference

Jesse James Chatman Jr (born September 22, 1979) is an American former professional football player who was a running back in the National Football League (NFL). He played college football for the Eastern Washington Eagles and was signed by the San Diego Chargers as an undrafted free agent in 2002.

Chatman was also a member of the Miami Dolphins, New Orleans Saints, New York Jets and Virginia Destroyers.

== Early life ==
Chatman attended Franklin High School in Seattle, Washington, where he played running back. His head coach was Joseph Slye, who also coached future NFL players Corey Dillon and James Hasty. His position coach was former NFL-running back Terry Metcalf. Franklin High School later held a ceremony to display Chatman's jersey in recognition of his achievements at the school and his subsequent football career at Eastern Washington University and in the NFL.

== College career ==
Chatman played for the Eastern Washington University Eagles of the Big Sky Conference from 1999 to 2001. During his tenure, Chatman was an AP I-AA All-America selection, Big Sky Conference Offensive Player of Year and a first-team all-conference selection. He recorded the fourth-highest single-season rushing total in I-AA history, amassing 2,096 rushing yards. Chatman finished his career with 4,173 yards and 53 touchdowns.

== Professional career ==
=== San Diego Chargers ===
Chatman was one of 19 undrafted free agents originally signed by the San Diego Chargers in April 2002. After leading the NFL in rushing during the preseason with 234 yards on a 5.1 average, he made the team out of training camp. Chatman went on to appear in 10 games with no starts. On the season, he rushed for 19 yards on six carries, caught three passes for 44 yards and notched four tackles on special teams.

Chatman went on to appear in all 16 regular season games for the Chargers in 2003. Though he rarely saw action on offense (he finished the year with eight carries for 17 yards and five catches for 54 yards), he was the team's leading special teams tackler with 16 stops and also recovered a fumble. Also, while he was primarily a blocker on kickoffs, Chatman did return two kicks for a total of 31 yards during the season.

After re-signing with the team as an exclusive rights free agent, Chatman appeared in 15 games for the Chargers in 2004 despite a nagging toe injury. He had a career day against the Jacksonville Jaguars on October 10 when he rushed for 103 yards and a score. On the season, Chatman had 65 carries for 392 yards (a 6.0 average), two catches for 17 yards and three touchdowns. On special teams, he totaled four tackles and also had four kickoff returns for 89 yards, including a long of 35 yards. The toe injury finally got the best of him in the playoffs, when he was forced to sit out the team's AFC Wild Card match-up against the New York Jets.

A restricted free agent following March, Chatman was re-signed to a one-year deal. The addition of rookie Darren Sproles, the development of Michael Turner, Chatman's absence from Qualcomm Stadium in the offseason as well as weight issues all contributed to his release from the team that July.

=== First stint with Dolphins ===
Despite the concerns held by the Chargers, particularly head coach Marty Schottenheimer, Chatman received plenty of interest on the open market from teams like the Baltimore Ravens, Carolina Panthers, Minnesota Vikings, Oakland Raiders and Seattle Seahawks.

However, it was the Miami Dolphins who inked Chatman on September 3, 2005, to provide depth while Ricky Williams served a four-game suspension. Chatman was inactive for the first five games of the regular season with the Dolphins before being traded to the New Orleans Saints for a conditional seventh-round draft choice on October 11.

=== New Orleans Saints ===
Chatman spent three games with the Saints, inactive for all, before being released on November 2. He had worked out by the New England Patriots a few days later as the team was looking to add depth, but the team decided to sign running back Mike Cloud instead.

=== Second stint with the Dolphins ===
Chatman was not an active player in the NFL for 2006 and reportedly weighed 280 pounds. He shaved 60 pounds off his body which gave him the new explosiveness he needed to revive his career. After being out of the league in 2006, the Dolphins re-signed Chatman and allocated him to NFL Europa on February 21, 2007. This most recent stint with the Dolphins re-united him with head coach Cam Cameron, who was the offensive coordinator for the San Diego Chargers during Chatman's time there. Chatman began the 2007 season as Ronnie Brown's backup and saw limited duty until Week 7 against New England, when Brown went down with a serious knee injury. Chatman responded by running for an impressive 73 yards on only 7 carries before leaving the game temporarily with an injury of his own. Chatman came back in the 4th quarter to score the last touchdown of the game (and his first since 2004).

With the season-ending injury of Dolphin's starting running back Ronnie Brown, Jesse Chatman had been named the new starter for the Miami Dolphins. His best game came against a 13-10 heartbreaker to the Buffalo Bills, where he rushed for 124 yards on 27 carries. Jesse finished the year with a career-high 515 yards rushing with one touchdown.

=== New York Jets ===
Chatman signed a one-year deal with the New York Jets in the 2008 offseason. One week before the start of the season, he was suspended for four games for violating the league's substance abuse policy.

Jesse has a son named Sahvere and a daughter named Jaylynn Chatman.
