= Scott Mruczkowski =

American football player (born 1982)

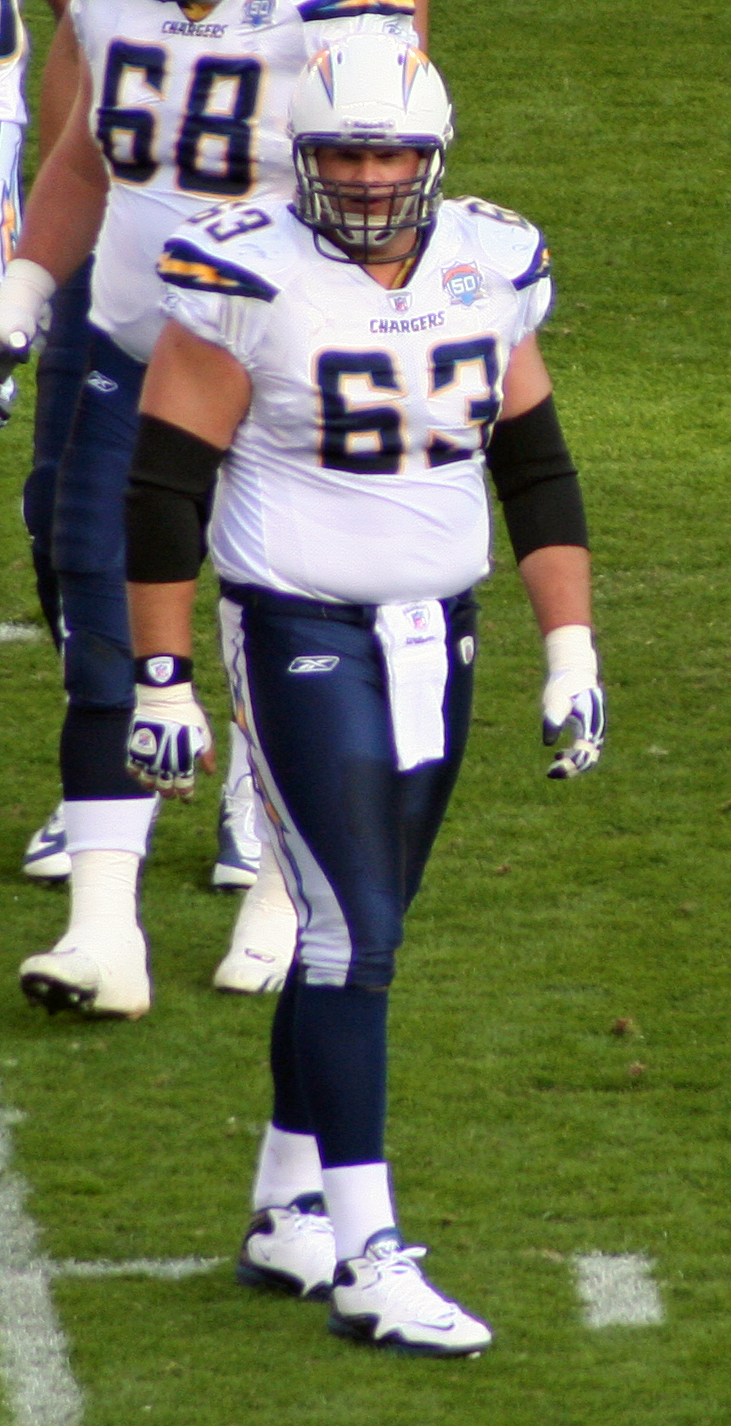
- Mruczkowski with the San Diego Chargers in 2009

No. 63
- Position: Center / Guard

Personal information
- Born: April 5, 1982 (age 44); Garfield Heights, Ohio, U.S.
- Listed height: 6 ft 5 in (1.96 m)
- Listed weight: 310 lb (141 kg)

Career information
- High school: Benedictine (Cleveland, Ohio)
- College: Bowling Green
- NFL draft: 2005: 7th round, 242nd overall pick

Career history
- San Diego Chargers (2005−2011); Carolina Panthers (2012)*
- * Offseason or practice squad member only

Awards and highlights
- First-team All-MAC (2003); Second-team All-MAC (2004)

Career NFL statistics
- Games played: 83
- Games started: 16
- Stats at Pro Football Reference

Scott Allen Mruczkowski [merch-COW-ski] (born April 5, 1982) is an American former professional football player who was a center in the National Football League (NFL). He was selected 242nd overall by the San Diego Chargers in the seventh round of the 2005 NFL draft. He played for the team for seven seasons. He played college football for the Bowling Green Falcons.

== Personal life ==
Mruczkowski married Kate LaMaster in 2010.
