= Shane Olivea =

American football player (1981–2022)

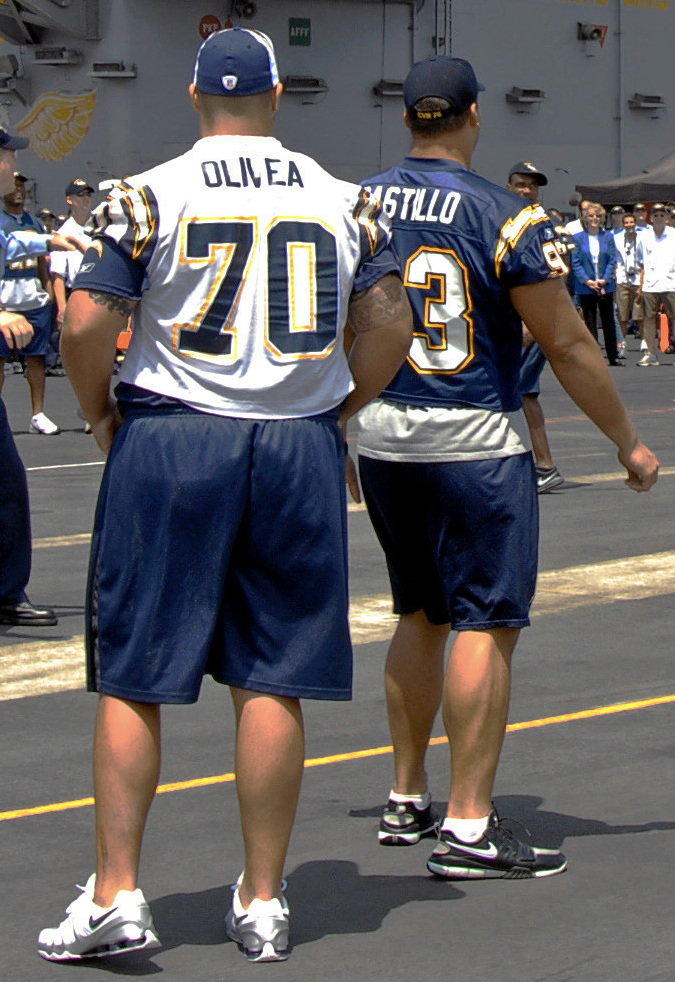
- Olivea (left) with Luis Castillo aboard the USS Ronald Reagan in 2006

No. 70
- Position: Offensive tackle

Personal information
- Born: October 7, 1981; Cedarhurst, New York, U.S.
- Died: March 2, 2022 (aged 40)
- Listed height: 6 ft 4 in (1.93 m)
- Listed weight: 325 lb (147 kg)

Career information
- High school: Lawrence (Cedarhurst)
- College: Ohio State
- NFL draft: 2004: 7th round, 209th overall pick

Career history
- San Diego Chargers (2004–2007); New York Giants (2008)*; Florida Tuskers (2010); Virginia Destroyers (2011)
- * Offseason or practice squad member only

Awards and highlights
- UFL champion (2011); PFWA All-Rookie Team (2004); PFW All-Rookie (2004); BCS national champion (2002); 2× Second-team All-Big Ten (2002, 2003)

Career NFL statistics
- Games started: 57
- Games played: 60
- Stats at Pro Football Reference

Shane Olivea (October 7, 1981 – March 2, 2022) was an American professional football player who was an offensive tackle in the National Football League (NFL). He was selected by the San Diego Chargers in the seventh round of the 2004 NFL draft. He played college football for the Ohio State Buckeyes. Olivea was also a member of the New York Giants, as well as the Florida Tuskers and Virginia Destroyers of the United Football League (UFL).

== College career ==
Olivea grew up in Long Beach, New York, and attended Lawrence High School his senior year. Olivea attended Ohio State University and played college football for the Ohio State Buckeyes from 2000 to 2003. He was a three-year starter and a two-time member of the All-Big Ten second team.

== Professional career ==
=== 2004 NFL draft ===
Originally valued as a third rounder, Olivea strained his pectoral muscle lifting weights about a week before the draft, negatively affecting his draft status. The Miami Dolphins wanted to take Olivea in the first day but called just before their 3rd round pick to tell Olivea that they took him off their draft board because they thought he would need surgery. A. J. Smith, excited at the fact Olivea was off many draft boards, took him with one of their final picks. Concerning Olivea's injury status, A. J. said, “We checked him out, like a lot of clubs, but medical staffs vary. We rely heavily on our medical staff, and he checked out perfectly. We’re not going to take a chance if we think a player is damaged goods. We were doing other things (in earlier rounds), so selfishly we were kind of glad he took a ride (dropped in draft status) and he was still there. We kind of stole one in the seventh round.”

Olivea was selected by the Chargers (209th overall) in the seventh round of the 2004 NFL draft.

Pre-draft measurables
Height	Weight	40-yard dash	Vertical jump
6 ft 4 in (1.93 m)	302 lb (137 kg)	5.00 s	33 1/2 in (0.85 m)
All values from NFL Combine

=== San Diego Chargers ===
Since being drafted in 2004, Olivea started 31 of 32 games in 2 seasons for the Chargers. In August 2006, The Chargers rewarded Olivea with a 6-year, $20 million extension. The deal made him the sixth highest-paid right tackle in the NFL at the time. Due to his performance and his low draft position, Olivea was considered to be a draft steal.

On February 28, 2008, Olivea was released by the Chargers, due to a missed drug test following a previous failed drug test. Olivea tested positive for pain medication.

=== New York Giants ===
On July 10, 2008, it was reported that Olivea had agreed to terms on a contract with the New York Giants.

On August 14, 2008, the Giants placed Olivea on season-ending injured reserve with a back injury. He was later released with an injury settlement.

== Personal life ==
During his playing career, Olivea developed an addiction to pain killers. He said that he took as many as 125 Vicodin pills in one day. He checked into the Betty Ford Center in 2008 and spent 89 days in treatment there. In 2015, Olivea returned to Ohio State to complete his bachelor's degree.

== Death ==
Olivea died on March 2, 2022, at the age of 40, with the cause of death revealed on June 21 to be from hypertensive heart disease contributed by obesity.
