= Ryan Krause =

American football player (born 1981)

No. 89, 87
- Position: Tight end

Personal information
- Born: June 16, 1981 (age 45); Omaha, Nebraska, U.S.
- Listed height: 6 ft 3 in (1.91 m)
- Listed weight: 244 lb (111 kg)

Career information
- High school: Millard South (Omaha)
- College: Nebraska–Omaha Mavericks
- NFL draft: 2004: 6th round, 169th overall pick

Career history
- San Diego Chargers (2004–2006); Cleveland Browns (2007)*; Green Bay Packers (2007); Houston Texans (2008)*
- * Offseason or practice squad member only

Career NFL statistics
- Receptions: 7
- Receiving yards: 92
- Receiving touchdowns: 1
- Stats at Pro Football Reference

Ryan Krause (born June 16, 1981) is an American former professional football player who was a tight end in the National Football League (NFL). He was selected by the San Diego Chargers in the sixth round of the 2004 NFL draft with the 169th overall pick. He played college football for the Nebraska–Omaha Mavericks.

Krause was also a member of the Cleveland Browns, Green Bay Packers, and Houston Texans.
