= 2002 San Diego Chargers season =

43rd season in franchise history, collapse after 6–1 start

- Owner: Alex Spanos
- General manager: John Butler
- Head coach: Marty Schottenheimer
- Home stadium: Qualcomm Stadium

Results
- Record: 8–8
- Division place: 3rd AFC West
- Playoffs: Did not qualify
- All-Pros: 2: LB Donnie Edwards (2nd team); RB LaDainian Tomlinson (2nd team)
- Pro Bowlers: 3: LB Donnie Edwards; LB Junior Seau; RB LaDainian Tomlinson

The 2002 season was the San Diego Chargers' 33rd in the National Football League (NFL), their 43rd overall and their first under head coach Marty Schottenheimer. Their stadium, Qualcomm Stadium, hosted Super Bowl XXXVII at the end of the season, but the Chargers' failure to secure a playoff berth marked the 18th straight season that the Super Bowl did not include the team in whose region the game was being played. Their division was reduced to four teams at the start of the season, with the Seattle Seahawks moving to the NFC. Despite going into their bye week with a 6–1 record, the Chargers suffered a late-season collapse, winning just two out of their last nine games after their bye week and missing the postseason.

This season would be the last for two longtime defensive stalwarts in Charger uniforms; as future Hall-of-Fame linebacker Junior Seau would leave for the Miami Dolphins; while longtime safety Rodney Harrison would likewise leave for New England. Seau and Harrison would be reunited with the Patriots from 2006 until Harrison's retirement after the 2008 season.

== Offseason ==
Additions	Subtractions
TE Stephen Alexander (Redskins)	TE Steve Heiden (Browns)
LB Donnie Edwards (Chiefs)	LB John Holecek (Falcons)
G Bob Hallen (Falcons)	LB Sam Rogers (Falcons)
C Cory Raymer (Redskins)	G Raleigh Roundtree (Cardinals)
DT Jason Fisk (Titans)	TE Freddie Jones (Cardinals)
SS Keith Lyle (Redskins)	G DeMingo Graham (Texans)

=== NFL draft ===
2002 San Diego Chargers draft
Round	Pick	Player	Position	College	Notes
1	5	Quentin Jammer	Cornerback	Texas	
2	39	Toniu Fonoti	Guard	Nebraska	
2	48	Reche Caldwell	Wide receiver	Florida	
3	71	Ben Leber	Linebacker	Kansas State	
4	103	Justin Peelle	Tight end	Oregon	
5	142	Terry Charles	Wide receiver	Portland State	
6	178	Matt Anderle	Tackle	Minnesota	
7	216	Seth Burford	Quarterback	Cal Poly	
Made roster * Made at least one Pro Bowl during career

=== Undrafted free agents ===
2002 undrafted free agents of note
Player	Position	College
Jason Ball	Center	New Hampshire
Jesse Chatman	Running back	Eastern Washington
Chris Demaree	Defensive end	Kentucky
Vernon Fox	Safety	Fresno State
Bart Hendricks	Quarterback	Boise State
Tony Okanlawon	Cornerback	Maryland
Josh Norman	Tight end	Oklahoma

== Personnel ==
=== Staff ===
2002 San Diego Chargers staff
Front office: chairman of the board – Alex Spanos; President/chief executive officer – Dean Spanos; Executive vice president – Michael Spanos; Executive vice president/general manager – John Butler; Assistant general manager/director of pro personnel – A. J. Smith; Vice president of football operations – Ed McGuire; Director of player personnel – Buddy Nix; Director of college scouting – Jimmy Raye; Head coaches: Head coach – Marty Schottenheimer; Associate head coach/defense – Bill Arnsparger; Offensive coaches: Offensive coordinator – Cam Cameron; Quarterbacks – Brian Schottenheimer; Running backs – Clarence Shelmon; Wide receivers – James Lofton; Tight ends – Tim Brewster; Offensive line – Hudson Houck; Offensive assistant/quality control – Pete Carmichael, Jr.	Defensive coaches: Defensive coordinator – Dale Lindsey; Defensive line – Wayne Nunnely; Linebackers – Greg Manusky; Defensive backs – Jerry Holmes; Defensive assistant/quality control – John Pagano; Special projects – Joe Pascale; Special teams coaches: Special teams – Steve Crosby; Strength and conditioning: Strength and conditioning – Dave Redding; Assistant strength and conditioning – Matt Schiotz

=== Roster ===
2002 San Diego Chargers roster
Quarterbacks (QB): 7 Doug Flutie; 9 Drew Brees; 12 Seth Burford; Running backs (RB): 24 Jesse Chatman; 41 Terrell Fletcher; 45 Joey Goodspeed FB; 28 Ronney Jenkins; 44 Fred McCrary FB; 21 LaDainian Tomlinson; Wide receivers (WR): 82 Reche Caldwell; 80 Curtis Conway; 85 Tim Dwight; 86 Dondre Gilliam; 88 Eric Parker; Tight ends (TE): 81 Stephen Alexander; 83 Josh Norman; 84 Justin Peelle	Offensive linemen (OL): 60 Jason Ball C; 69 Ed Ellis T; 71 Toniu Fonoti G; 63 Kelvin Garmon G; 62 Bob Hallen G; 61 Michael Keathley C; 77 Damion McIntosh T; 70 Vaughn Parker T; 79 Sammy Williams T; Defensive linemen (DL): 96 Leonardo Carson DT; 90 Adrian Dingle DE; 92 Jason Fisk DT; 99 Raylee Johnson DE; 93 Otis Leverette DE; 91 Shawn Price DT; 78 DeQuincy Scott DT; 75 Marcellus Wiley DE	Linebackers (LB): 59 Donnie Edwards MLB; 51 Ben Leber OLB; 57 Zeke Moreno OLB; 52 Carlos Polk OLB; 56 Orlando Ruff MLB; 55 Junior Seau OLB; Defensive backs (DB): 42 Rogers Beckett FS; 36 Vernon Fox SS; 37 Rodney Harrison SS; 32 Kevin House CB; 23 Quentin Jammer CB; 35 Keith Lyle FS; 47 Ryan McNeil CB; 25 Alex Molden CB; 33 Davis Sanchez CB; 20 Jerry Wilson CB/S; Special teams (ST): 2 Darren Bennett P; 50 David Binn LS; 8 Steve Christie K	Practice squad: 53 Luke Butkus C; 87 Ramondo North WR; 94 Scott Pospisil DT; 74 Zack Quaccia C; Reserve: 13 Terry Charles WR (IR); 27 Tay Cody CB (IR); 54 Eric Guenther LB (NF-Inj.); 34 Tony Okanlawon CB (IR); 10 DeRonnie Pitts WR (NF-Inj.); 66 Cory Raymer C (IR); 49 Mukala Sikyala RB (NF-Inj.); 97 Doug Sims DT (IR); 76 Jamal Williams NT (IR); Rookies in italics 53 active, 9 reserve, 4 practice squad

== Preseason ==
Week	Date	Opponent	Result	Record	Venue	Attendance
1	August 10	Arizona Cardinals	L 14–24	0–1	Qualcomm Stadium	
2	August 16	Seattle Seahawks	W 24–14	1–1	Qualcomm Stadium	
3	August 22	at St. Louis Rams	W 31–10	2–1	Edward Jones Dome	
4	August 28	at San Francisco 49ers	L 3–27	2–2	3Com Park	

== Regular season ==
=== Schedule ===
In addition to their regular games with AFC West rivals, the Chargers played teams from the AFC East and NFC West as per the schedule rotation, and also played intraconference games against the Texans and the Bengals based on divisional positions from 2001.

Week	Date	Opponent	Result	Record	Venue	Attendance
1	September 8	at Cincinnati Bengals	**W** 34–6	1–0	Paul Brown Stadium	53,705
2	September 15	Houston Texans	**W** 24–3	2–0	Qualcomm Stadium	56,098
3	September 22	at Arizona Cardinals	**W** 23–15	3–0	Sun Devil Stadium	28,980
4	September 29	New England Patriots	**W** 21–14	4–0	Qualcomm Stadium	66,463
5	October 6	at **Denver Broncos**	**L** 9–26	4–1	Invesco Field	75,065
6	October 13	**Kansas City Chiefs**	**W** 35–34	5–1	Qualcomm Stadium	58,995
7	October 20	at **Oakland Raiders**	**W** 27–21 (OT)	6–1	Network Associates Coliseum	60,974
8	Bye					
9	November 3	New York Jets	**L** 13–44	6–2	Qualcomm Stadium	59,772
10	November 10	at St. Louis Rams	**L** 24–28	6–3	Edward Jones Dome	66,093
11	November 17	San Francisco 49ers	**W** 20–17 (OT)	7–3	Qualcomm Stadium	67,161
12	November 24	at Miami Dolphins	**L** 3–30	7–4	Pro Player Stadium	73,138
13	December 1	**Denver Broncos**	**W** 30–27 (OT)	8–4	Qualcomm Stadium	66,357
14	December 8	**Oakland Raiders**	**L** 7–27	8–5	Qualcomm Stadium	67,968
15	December 15	at Buffalo Bills	**L** 13–20	8–6	Ralph Wilson Stadium	61,838
16	December 22	at **Kansas City Chiefs**	**L** 22–24	8–7	Arrowhead Stadium	77,899
17	December 29	Seattle Seahawks	**L** 28–31 (OT)	8–8	Qualcomm Stadium	52,159

Note: Intra-division opponents are in bold text.

=== Game summaries ===
==== Week 1: at Cincinnati Bengals ====
Week 1: San Diego Chargers (0–0) at Cincinnati Bengals (0–0) – Game summary

Quarter	1	2	3	4	Total
**Chargers**	10	10	7	7	**34**
Bengals	0	0	3	3	**6**

at Paul Brown Stadium, Cincinnati, Ohio

- Date: September 9
- Game time: 1:00 p.m. EDT
- Game weather: 90 °F (32 °C), relative humidity 60%, wind 7 mph
- Game attendance: 53,705
- Referee: Johnny Grier
- TV announcers (CBS): Don Criqui and Solomon Wilcots
- Box score, Game Book

Game information

**First quarter**

- SDG – Steve Christie 28-yard field goal, 8:48. Chargers 3–0. **Drive: 11 plays, 66 yards, 6:12.**
- SDG – Josh Norman 1-yard pass from Drew Brees (Steve Christie kick), 1:18. Chargers 10–0. **Drive: 6 plays, 14 yards, 3:13.**

**Second quarter**

- SDG – Steve Christie 27-yard field goal, 13:14. Chargers 13–0. **Drive: 6 plays, 58 yards, 2:03.**
- SDG – LaDainian Tomlinson 1-yard run (Steve Christie kick), 0:19. Chargers 20–0. **Drive: 15 plays, 95 yards, 7:55.**

**Third quarter**

- CIN – Neil Rackers 21-yard field goal, 11:17. Chargers 20–3. **Drive: 9 plays, 77 yards, 3:43.**
- SDG – Curtis Conway 9-yard pass from Drew Brees (Steve Christie kick), 8:42. Chargers 27–3. **Drive: 5 plays, 64 yards, 2:35.**

**Fourth quarter**

- SDG – Terrell Fletcher 1-yard run (Steve Christie kick), 9:14. Chargers 34–3. **Drive: 12 plays, 78 yards, 8:31.**
- CIN – Neil Rackers 54-yard field goal, 5:43. Chargers 34–6. **Drive: 11 plays, 41 yards, 3:31.**

**Top passers**

- SDG – Drew Brees – 15/19, 160 yards, 2 TD
- CIN – Gus Frerotte – 18/31, 198 yards, INT

**Top rushers**

- SDG – LaDainian Tomlinson – 21 rushes, 114 yards, TD
- CIN – Gus Frerotte – 2 rushes, 14 yards

**Top receivers**

- SDG – LaDainian Tomlinson – 3 receptions, 45 yards
  SDG – Tim Dwight – 3 receptions, 45 yards
- CIN – Danny Farmer – 2 receptions, 54 yards

Tomlinson had a 14-yard run and a 13-yard catch on the Chargers' opening drive of the season, which resulted in a field goal. Their first touchdown was set up by Alex Molden intercepting Gus Frerotte at the Cincinnati 14; Tomlinson converted a 3rd and 5 with a 6-yard run, and Josh Norman's touchdown catch followed two play later. After a 22-yard Conway run on a reverse, San Diego extended their lead with Christie's second field goal. On their next drive, they embarked on a 95-yard drive in which all but 7 yards came from running the ball. Tomlinson had gains of 14 and 17 yards, and finished the drive from a yard out shortly before halftime.

Cincinnati managed a field goal on the opening drive of the second half, but Tomlinson's 30-yard catch on the next play from scrimmage was followed by a 20-yard end-around by Dwight, with Conway's 9-yard touchdown catch soon following on a 3rd and 5 play. Terrell Fletcher added the final Charger touchdown on a drive that saw him carry the ball on seven consecutive plays at one point.

San Diego totalled 45 carries for 241 yards, against Cincinnati's 13 carries for 36 yards; they gained 16 rushing first downs while the Bengals had just 2. This helped them to control possession for 37:48 of the match.

==== Week 2: vs. Houston Texans ====
Week 2: Houston Texans (1–0) at San Diego Chargers (1–0) – Game summary

Quarter	1	2	3	4	Total
Texans	0	3	0	0	**3**
**Chargers**	14	3	0	7	**24**

at Qualcomm Stadium, San Diego, California

- Date: September 15
- Game time: 1:15 p.m. PDT
- Game weather: 74 °F (23 °C), relative humidity 78%, wind 8 mph
- Game attendance: 56,098
- Referee: Mike Carey
- TV announcers (CBS): Craig Bolerjack, Craig James, Scott Kaplan
- Box score, Game Book

Game information

**First quarter**

- SDG – Curtis Conway 35-yard pass from Drew Brees (Steve Christie kick), 10:45. Chargers 7–0. **Drive: 9 plays, 78 yards, 4:15.**
- SDG – Curtis Conway 3-yard run (Steve Christie kick), 2:03. Chargers 14–0. **Drive: 3 plays, 6 yards, 1:24.**

**Second quarter**

- HOU – Kris Brown 45-yard field goal, 9:14. Chargers 14–3. **Drive: 4 plays, 8 yards, 2:03.**
- SDG – Steve Christie 36-yard field goal, 0:03. Chargers 17–3. **Drive: 6 plays, 37 yards, 0:32.**

**Third quarter**

- No scoring plays.

**Fourth quarter**

- SDG – Raylee Johnson fumble recovery in end zone (Steve Christie kick), 11:40. Chargers 24–3.

**Top passers**

- HOU – David Carr – 6/25, 87 yards, 2 INT
- SDG – Drew Brees – 15/28, 163 yards, TD, INT

**Top rushers**

- HOU – James Allen – 13 rushes, 51 yards
- SDG – LaDainian Tomlinson – 27 rushes, 84 yards

**Top receivers**

- HOU – Jabar Gaffney – 2 receptions, 37 yards
- SDG – Curtis Conway – 5 receptions, 113 yards, TD

The Chargers took the opening kickoff and drove 78 yards to take the lead; Tomlinson converted a 3rd and 2 with a 6-yard run, and Conway pulled in a Brees pass up the left sideline for a 35-yard touchdown two plays later. Later in the 1st quarter, Seau intercepted a tipped ball and returned it 25 yards to the Houston 6. On 3rd and goal from the 3, Conway took an end-around and scored easily. Brees was sacked for a loss of 20 on the next Charger drive, eventually leading the Chargers to punt from their own 3. Houston took over at the San Diego 35 and scored their only points with a field goal despite only gaining 8 yards from there. Bennett pinned the Texans at their own 7 with a punt late in the half, and Seau sacked David Carr in the end zone, though the quarterback was ruled to have reached the ball over the goal line and avoided a safety. Houston were forced to punt from their own 1 yard line; San Diego took over at their own 46 and Conway's 23- and 14-yard receptions moved them into position for Christie's field goal.

Houston drove into Charger territory on the opening drive of the second half, but were forced to punt after a Wiley 3rd-down sack; the Texans failed gain a first down on their next five drives. San Diego missed a scoring chance in the 3rd quarter when Brees was intercepted at the goal line on 1st and 10 from the Texans 42, but their defense scored the game's final points early in the final quarter. Bennett pinned the Texans at their own 5 and Leber sacked Carr in the end zone two plays later; the quarterback fumbled, and Raylee Johnson recovered. In the final five minutes, Vernon Fox intercepted Carr and Leber sacked him on 4th down as the Charger defense conceded no touchdowns for the second game in a row.

Leber had 3 sacks and the Chargers had 9 – it was their most for 16 years. With Carr only passing for 87 yards and losing 58 yards from the sacks, the Texans finished with 29 net passing yards; they were allowed only 118 yards and 7 first downs.

==== Week 3: at Arizona Cardinals ====
Week 3: San Diego Chargers (2–0) at Arizona Cardinals (1–1) – Game summary

Quarter	1	2	3	4	Total
**Chargers**	0	14	0	9	**23**
Cardinals	7	0	0	8	**15**

at State Farm Stadium, Glendale, Arizona

- Date: September 22
- Game time: 2:05 p.m. MDT
- Game weather: 100 °F (38 °C), relative humidity 10%, no wind
- Game attendance: 28,980
- Referee: Ed Hochuli
- TV announcers (CBS): Don Criqui and Steve Tasker
- Box score, Game Book

Game information

**First quarter**

- ARI – MarTay Jenkins 65-yard pass from Jake Plummer (Bill Gramatica kick), 10:11. Cardinals 7–0. **Drive: 3 plays, 71 yards, 1:30.**

**Second quarter**

- SDG – LaDainian Tomlinson 4-yard run (Steve Christie kick), 14:56. Tied 7–7. **Drive: 2 plays, 6 yards, 0:38.**
- SDG – LaDainian Tomlinson 2-yard run (Steve Christie kick), 5:03. Chargers 14–7. **Drive: 10 plays, 62 yards, 5:41.**

**Third quarter**

- No scoring plays.

**Fourth quarter**

- SDG – Punt blocked by Carlos Polk declared dead in end zone for a Safety, 14:44. Chargers 16–7.
- SDG – Donnie Edwards 20-yard interception return (Steve Christie kick), 11:23. Chargers 23–7.
- ARI – Marcel Shipp 31-yard pass from Jake Plummer (Jake Plummer–Frank Sanders pass), 9:30. Chargers 23–15. **Drive: 5 plays, 80 yards, 1:53.**

**Top passers**

- SDG – Drew Brees – 17/31, 181 yards, INT
- ARI – Jake Plummer – 16/36, 229 yards, 2 TD, 2 INT

**Top rushers**

- SDG – LaDainian Tomlinson – 26 rushes, 91 yards, 2 TD
- ARI – Thomas Jones – 17 rushes, 73 yards

**Top receivers**

- SDG – Curtis Conway – 7 receptions, 92 yards
- ARI – MarTay Jenkins – 2 receptions, 70 yards, TD

**Team** – pass – rush – total – to

- SDG – 181 – 125 – 289 – 1
- ARI – 229 – 97 – 297 – 3

San Diego conceded their first touchdown of the season on the Cardinals' second play, when MarTay Jenkins took a short pass 65 yards for a touchdown. Christie missed a 50-yard field goal late in the 1st quarter, but Wiley intercepted a pass near the line of scrimmage two plays later and returned it 40 yards to the 6 yard line. Tomlinson's first touchdown followed when he took a pitch two plays later. On the next Arizona drive, Leber forced a fumble that McNeil recovered at his own 38. The Chargers again capitalized on the turnover, with Stephen Alexander's 19-yard catch and run converting a 3rd and 6 and Tomlinson scoring his second touchdown of the day. Late in the half, Wiley sacked Jake Plummer to push the Cardinals out of field goal range, keeping the San Diego lead at 14–7.

After a scoreless 3rd quarter, the Chargers score through their special teams. With Arizona punting from their own 8, Carlos Polk broke through to block the kick through the back of the end zone for a safety. Later, Edwards stepped in front of an out pattern, intercepted the ball and returned it 20 yards for a touchdown. Arizona soon halved the deficit with Plummer passing for both a touchdown and a two-point conversion. The Chargers reached a 3rd and 5 at the Arizona 33, but Brees was intercepted with five minutes to play. Given a chance to tie, Arizona drove to a 1st and goal at the San Diego 9 at the two minute warning, from where Plummer threw four incompletions. The Cardinals had one more possession, but Plummer was sacked by Johnson and threw incomplete from his own 38 to end the game.

==== Week 4: vs. New England Patriots ====
Week 4: New England Patriots (3–0) at San Diego Chargers (3–0) – Game summary

Quarter	1	2	3	4	Total
Patriots	7	7	0	0	**14**
**Chargers**	7	7	7	0	**21**

at Qualcomm Stadium, San Diego, California

- Date: September 29
- Game time: 1:15 p.m. PDT
- Game weather: 67 °F (19 °C), relative humidity 76%, wind 8 mph
- Game attendance: 66,463
- Referee: Ron Blum
- TV announcers (CBS): Greg Gumbel, Phil Simms, and Armen Keteyian
- Box score, Game Book

Game information

**First quarter**

- NE – Christian Fauria 5-yard pass from Tom Brady (Adam Vinatieri kick), 9:26. Patriots 7–0. **Drive: 11 plays, 67 yards, 5:34.**
- SDG – Curtis Conway 52-yard pass from Drew Brees (Steve Christie kick), 4:17. Tied 7–7. **Drive: 5 plays, 87 yards, 2:33.**

**Second quarter**

- NE – Mike Vrabel 1-yard pass from Tom Brady (Adam Vinatieri kick), 14:13. Patriots 14–7. **Drive: 10 plays, 65 yards, 5:04.**
- SDG – LaDainian Tomlinson 37-yard run (Steve Christie kick), 2:19. Tied 14–14. **Drive: 9 plays, 69 yards, 4:33.**

**Third quarter**

- SDG – LaDainian Tomlinson 58-yard run (Steve Christie kick), 14:14. Chargers 21–14. **Drive: 2 plays, 67 yards, 0:46.**

**Fourth quarter**

- No scoring plays.

**Top passers**

- NE – Tom Brady – 36/53, 353 yards, 2 TD, 2 INT
- SDG – Drew Brees – 10/18, 104 yards, TD

**Top rushers**

- NE – Antowain Smith – 16 rushes, 78 yards
- SDG – LaDainian Tomlinson – 27 rushes, 217 yards, 2 TD

**Top receivers**

- NE – Deion Branch – 13 receptions, 128 yards
- SDG – Curtis Conway – 3 receptions, 69 yards, TD

New England, the defending Super Bowl champions, scored a touchdown on the game's opening drive. A Fred McCrary fumble soon set the Patriots up at the San Diego 39, but the Charger defense allowed only three yards and forced a punt. Tomlinson then carried the ball on four consecutive plays, gaining 5, 4, 7 and 24 yards to bring up a 1st and 10 at their own 48. Brees then used play action before hitting Conway in stride up the left sideline; he made the catch at the 15 and completed the 52-yard touchdown. New England responded with a 65-yard drive to Tom Brady's second touchdown pass of the day. New England had a chance to extend their lead on their next possession, but Adam Vinatieri missed a field goal wide right from 41 yards out. Brees then converted a 3rd and 7 with an 11-yard pass to Dwight, and scrambled for 10 yards on 3rd and 10. On 3rd and 2 from the New England 37, Tomlinson cut through a hole in the line of scrimmage and outran the defense for the game-tying touchdown.

Tomlinson put the Chargers ahead with a 58-yard touchdown run two plays into the second half. He cut to the right to evade two Patriots at the line of scrimmage, slipped a tackle ten yards upfield and benefitted from a Dwight block up the right sideline to complete the run. There were no more points despite numerous scoring chances the rest of the way. McNeil intercepted Brady on a 3rd and 6 from the Charger 30; Tomlinson converted a 4th and inches on the following drive, but was later stopped on 4th and 1. New England drove to a 2nd and 1 at the Charger 23, but Brady was again intercepted, this time by Edwards, who returned the ball 46 yards to the opposition 47 yard line. That led to a Christie field goal attempt, but his 50-yard kick was blocked. The Patriots went for it on 4th and inches at the San Diego 39, but Leber tackled Marc Edwards just short. Following a Charger punt, New England again drove into Charger territory, but Seau stopped an attempted draw play in the backfield on a 3rd and 10 from the 39, forcing a punt. Tomlinson picked up two first downs before Bennett's 52-yard punt pinned New England at their 4 with 1:51 to play and a single timeout to work with. The Patriots converted a 4th and 1 and crossed midfield again, but Kevin Faulk's attempted lateral went loose at the Charger 42, and Molden recovered with 8 seconds left to clinch the win.

Tomlinson's 217 yards tied the franchise record set by Gary Anderson in 1988. New England made it at least as far as the San Diego 42 yard line on every one of their ten drives throughout the game. The result broke a ten-game losing streak for San Diego against the Patriots, beating them for the first time since the 1970 season.

==== Week 5: at Denver Broncos ====
Week 5: San Diego Chargers (4–0) at Denver Broncos (3–1) – Game summary

Quarter	1	2	3	4	Total
Chargers	0	0	3	6	**9**
**Broncos**	7	12	0	7	**26**

at Invesco Field at Mile High, Denver, Colorado

- Date: October 6
- Game time: 2:05 p.m. MDT
- Game weather: 57 °F (14 °C), relative humidity 45%, wind 9 mph
- Game attendance: 75,065
- Referee: Dick Hantak
- TV announcers (CBS): Ian Eagle and Solomon Wilcots
- Box score, Game Book

Game information

**First quarter**

- DEN – Ed McCaffrey 69-yard pass from Brian Griese (Jason Elam kick), 12:57. Broncos 7–0. **Drive: 2 plays, 72 yards, 0:43.**

**Second quarter**

- DEN – Clinton Portis 8-yard pass from Brian Griese (Jason Elam kick), 4:25. Broncos 14–0. **Drive: 13 plays, 84 yards, 7:55.**
- DEN – Punt blocked by Sam Brandon out of bounds in end zone for a Safety, 2:22. Broncos 16–0.
- DEN – Jason Elam 36-yard field goal, 0:00. Broncos 19–0. **Drive: 12 plays, 60 yards, 2:22.**

**Third quarter**

- SDG – Steve Christie 24-yard field goal, 10:40. Broncos 19–3. **Drive: 8 plays, 44 yards, 2:49.**

**Fourth quarter**

- DEN – Deltha O'Neal 28-yard interception return (Jason Elam kick), 2:54. Broncos 26–3.
- SDG – Curtis Conway 8-yard pass from Drew Brees (pass failed), 1:31. Broncos 26–9. **Drive: 11 plays, 78 yards, 1:23.**

**Top passers**

- SDG – Drew Brees – 26/42, 235 yards, TD, 2 INT
- DEN – Brian Griese – 26/35, 316 yards, 2 TD, INT

**Top rushers**

- SDG – LaDainian Tomlinson – 14 rushes, 48 yards
- DEN – Clinton Portis – 20 rushes, 102 yards

**Top receivers**

- SDG – Curtis Conway – 6 receptions, 68 yards, TD
  SDG – Tim Dwight – 5 receptions, 68 yards
- DEN – Ed McCaffrey – 6 receptions, 113 yards, TD

Seau missed the game with an ankle injury his first game missed since the 1999 season finale at Denver; on the Broncos' second play, Ed McCaffrey was open on a slant pattern in the vicinity of Harrison Seau's replacement, Zeke Moreno, taking the ball in untouched for a 69-yard touchdown barely two minutes into the game. Denver were soon threatening to score again when they reached a 1st and 10 on the Charger 14, but Harrison intercepted Brian Griese. A 14-play, 86-yard drive followed, but Brees was intercepted in the end zone on 2nd and goal from the 6. Denver drove 84 yards the other way to double their lead; they faced a 1st and 30, but Griese had completions of 11, 12, 5 and 9 yards to convert on 4th down. Bennett batted his own blocked punt out of the end zone for the safety, before Jason Elam's field goal made it 19–0 at halftime.

On the Chargers' first possession of the second half, Schottenheimer opted for a field goal when the Chargers reached 4th and 1 at the 6. Their next four possessions ended with a punt, a Tomlinson fumble, another punt, and Brees' pass being intercepted by Deltha O'Neal and run back for the clinching touchdown. Brees passed on every play of the next drive, completing 6 of 11 for 78 yards and Conway's consolation touchdown.

==== Week 6: vs. Kansas City Chiefs ====
Week 6: Kansas City Chiefs (3–2) at San Diego Chargers (4–1) – Game summary

Quarter	1	2	3	4	Total
Chiefs	10	7	7	10	**34**
**Chargers**	7	0	7	21	**35**

at Qualcomm Stadium, San Diego, California

- Date: October 13
- Game time: 1:15 p.m. PDT
- Game weather: 67 °F (19 °C), relative humidity 74%, wind 7 mph
- Game attendance: 58,995
- Referee: Walt Coleman
- TV announcers (CBS): Craig Bolerjack, Craig James and Scott Kaplan
- Box score, Game Book

Game information

**First quarter**

- SDG – Tim Dwight 19-yard run (Steve Christie kick), 11:50. Chargers 7–0. **Drive: 5 plays, 66 yards, 2:00.**
- KC – Morten Andersen 28-yard field goal, 5:17. Chargers 7–3. **Drive: 11 plays, 60 yards, 6:33.**
- KC – Priest Holmes 1-yard run (Morten Andersen kick), 3:51. Chiefs 10–7. **Drive: 2 plays, 1 yard, 0:10.**

**Second quarter**

- KC – Marc Boerigter 44-yard pass from Trent Green (Morten Andersen kick), 2:00. Chiefs 17–7. **Drive: 6 plays, 91 yards, 3:13.**

**Third quarter**

- SDG – LaDainian Tomlinson 1-yard run (Steve Christie kick), 5:58. Chiefs 17–14. **Drive: 2 plays, 9 yards, 0:45.**
- KC – Marc Boerigter 19-yard pass from Trent Green (Morten Andersen kick), 2:24. Chiefs 24–14. **Drive: 3 plays, 28 yards, 1:29.**

**Fourth quarter**

- SDG – Curtis Conway 11-yard run (Steve Christie kick), 13:16. Chiefs 24–21. **Drive: 8 plays, 59 yards, 4:08.**
- KC – Tony Gonzalez 3-yard pass from Trent Green (Morten Andersen kick), 8:06. Chiefs 31–21. **Drive: 8 plays, 60 yards, 5:10.**
- SDG – Tim Dwight 11-yard pass from Drew Brees (Steve Christie kick), 4:07. Chiefs 31–28. **Drive: 9 plays, 65 yards, 3:59.**
- KC – Morten Andersen 43-yard field goal, 2:30. Chiefs 34–28. **Drive: 7 plays, 38 yard, 1:37.**
- SDG – Reche Caldwell 2-yard pass from Drew Brees (Steve Christie kick), 0:14. Chargers 35–34. **Drive: 7 plays, 71 yards, 2:16.**

**Top passers**

- KC – Trent Green – 17/29, 236 yards, 3 TD, 2 INT
- SDG – Drew Brees – 28/41, 319 yards, 2 TD, 2 INT

**Top rushers**

- KC – Priest Holmes – 23 rushes, 63 yards, TD
- SDG – LaDainian Tomlinson – 20 rushes, 78 yards, TD

**Top receivers**

- KC – Priest Holmes – 7 receptions, 96 yards
- SDG – Curtis Conway – 8 receptions, 129 yards

Brees connected with Norman for 29 yards on the Chargers' first play from scrimmage. After Tomlinson converted a 3rd and 1, Dwight took an end-around to the left sideline, cut inside a tackler and completed a 19-yard touchdown. After getting on the scoreboard with a field goal, Kansas City blocked a Bennett punt and had to drive only 1 yard to take the lead. The Chargers drove into the red zone twice in their next three possessions, but turned the ball over through a Conway fumble and a Brees interception. Conway also lost a fumble near midfield after Marc Boerigter's first touchdown, and the Chiefs led 17–7 at halftime.

Tamarick Vanover returned the opening kickoff of the second half for 39 yards, and San Diego advanced to a 1st and 10 at the Kansas City 33 before Jason Belser intercepted Brees at the goal line. Following an exchange of punts, Keith Lyle intercepted a Trent Green pass and returned it 26 yards to Chiefs' 9 yard line. Tomlinson's touchdown two plays later was the first of four in four possessions for the Charger offense. Kansas City appeared to have gone three-and-out on their next drive, but Vanover fumbled a punt and Boerigter scored three plays later. Next, Brees converted a 3rd and 4 with a 7-yard pass to Dwight, and Conway finished the drive with a 10-yard catch and an 11-yard end-around on consecutive plays. After Tony Gonzalez extended the Kansas City lead back to 10 points, San Diego drove 65 yards without facing a 3rd down, and scored with four minutes left when Dwight took a short pass over the middle and dove over a would-be tackler. The Chiefs gained two 1st downs, compelling San Diego to use all three of their timeouts, but eventually had to settle for a field goal with 2:30 to play. Conway had catches of 18, 16 and 25 yards on the game-winning drive; with Conway drawing double coverage, Reche Caldwell's touchdown came against man-to-man coverage on 3rd and 1 from the 2. Following a squib kick by Richey, Kansas City started at their own 47 with 10 seconds still to play, but the game ended with an incompletion and an interception by Edwards at his 2-yard line.

The 300-yard passing game was the first of 123 in Brees' career.

==== Week 7: at Oakland Raiders ====
Week 7: San Diego Chargers (5–1) at Oakland Raiders (4–1) – Game summary

Quarter	1	2	3	4	OT	Total
**Chargers**	0	7	7	7	6	**27**
Raiders	0	0	7	14	0	**21**

at Network Associates Coliseum, Oakland, California

- Date: October 20
- Game time: 1:05 p.m. PDT
- Game weather: 62 °F (17 °C), relative humidity 78%, wind 9 mph
- Game attendance: 60,974
- Referee: Tony Corrente
- TV announcers (CBS): Greg Gumbel, Phil Simms and Armen Keteyian
- Box score, Game Book

Game information

**First quarter**

- No scoring plays.

**Second quarter**

- SDG – Reche Caldwell 9-yard pass from Drew Brees (Steve Christie kick), 7:17. Chargers 7–0. **Drive: 8 plays, 58 yards, 4:17.**

**Third quarter**

- SDG – LaDainian Tomlinson 4-yard pass from Drew Brees (Steve Christie kick), 9:12. Chargers 14–0. **Drive: 10 plays, 79 yards, 5:48.**
- OAK – Jerry Rice 4-yard pass from Rich Gannon (Sebastian Janikowski kick), 5:16. Chargers 14–7. **Drive: 7 plays, 68 yards, 3:56.**

**Fourth quarter**

- OAK – Jerry Porter 17-yard pass from Rich Gannon (Sebastian Janikowski kick), 14:54. Tied 14–14. **Drive: 6 plays, 93 yards, 3:24.**
- SDG – Drew Brees 1-yard run (Steve Christie kick), 7:18. Chargers 21–14. **Drive: 9 plays, 62 yards, 4:26.**
- OAK – Jon Ritchie 7-yard pass from Rich Gannon (Sebastian Janikowski kick), 1:21. Tied 21–21. **Drive: 9 plays, 82 yards, 1:44.**

**Overtime**

- SDG – LaDainian Tomlinson 19-yard run, 11:22. Chargers 27–21. **Drive: 8 plays, 80 yards, 3:38.**

**Top passers**

- SDG – Drew Brees – 16/25, 170 yards, 2 TD
- OAK – Rich Gannon – 35/45, 361 yards, 3 TD, INT

**Top rushers**

- SDG – LaDainian Tomlinson – 39 rushes, 153 yards, TD
- OAK – Charlie Garner – 7 rushes, 24 yards

**Top receivers**

- SDG – Tim Dwight – 4 receptions, 75 yards
- OAK – Jerry Rice – 9 receptions, 86 yards, TD

With the Chargers coming into this game at 5–1, and the Raiders at 4–1, the winners would be top of the AFC West. Tim Brown's 45-yard catch on the game's first drive set up a 27-yard field goal attempt, but Sebastian Janikowski struck the right upright. The Raiders missed another scoring chance on their next drive, reaching 2nd and goal at the 11 before Rich Gannon's shovel pass was deflected and intercepted by Edwards. San Diego scored the half's only points midway through the 2nd quarter: Tomlinson had gains of 11, 11 and 10 yards, Dwight took a double reverse for 19 yards, and Caldwell's touchdown came on a 3rd and 7 from the 9.

The Chargers doubled their lead on the first drive of the second half. Dwight converted a 3rd and 4 with an 8-yard catch, and followed it two plays later with a 31-yard catch to the Oakland 11; Tomlinson's touchdown catch came on 3rd and 3 from the 4. Gannon passed on 12 of 13 plays over the next two Raider drives, as they scored two touchdowns without having to convert a 3rd down. Janikowski missed another field goal with soon afterwards, this time from 48 yards. San Diego then drove 68 yards to retake the lead. The touchdown again came on 3rd down – this time Brees scored on a 1-yard quarterback sneak. Following an exchange of punts, the Raiders again put together a touchdown drive with no 3rd-down conversions; Gannon passed on every play, completing 8 of 9 for 82 yards and the game-tying touchdown. After one more possession each, the game went to overtime.

San Diego won the overtime coin toss and received the ball. Starting from their own 20, they opened with a 10-yard Tomlinson run, then Conway drew defensive pass interference for 15 more. On 3rd and 10, Dwight's 25-yard catch moved the ball to the Oakland 30. San Diego soon faced another 3rd and 10, and Dwight again converted, this time with an 11-yard catch. On the following play, Tomlinson raced through a large hole in the line of scrimmage, shrugged off two tacklers at the 10 and completed the game-winning touchdown.

Tomlinson's 39 carries tied Marion Butts' franchise record, set in 1989. With 5 catches, he had 44 touches in total, surpassing Natrone Means' franchise record, set in 1998. It was the Chargers' first overtime win since 1987, ending a run of eight consecutive defeats in the extra period.

==== Week 9: vs. New York Jets ====
Week 9: New York Jets (2–5) at San Diego Chargers (6–1) – Game summary

Quarter	1	2	3	4	Total
**Jets**	14	17	3	10	**44**
Chargers	0	7	6	0	**13**

at Qualcomm Stadium, San Diego, California

- Date: November 3
- Game time: 1:05 p.m. PST
- Game weather: 69 °F (21 °C), relative humidity 62%, wind 8 mph
- Game attendance: 59,772
- Referee: Bill Leavy
- TV announcers (CBS): Dick Enberg, Dan Dierdorf, and Bonnie Bernstein
- Box score, Game Book

Game information

**First quarter**

- NYJ – Chad Pennington 8-yard run (John Hall kick), 3:23. Jets 7–0. **Drive: 12 plays, 91 yards, 6:55.**
- NYJ – Santana Moss 52-yard punt return (John Hall kick), 0:43. Jets 14–0.

**Second quarter**

- NYJ – Anthony Becht 1-yard pass from Chad Pennington (John Hall kick), 6:13. Jets 21–0. **Drive: 6 plays, 48 yards, 3:40.**
- SDG – Curtis Conway 13-yard pass from Drew Brees (Steve Christie kick), 3:25. Jets 21–7. **Drive: 6 plays, 67 yards, 2:48.**
- NYJ – Curtis Martin 17-yard run (John Hall kick), 0:57. Jets 28–7. **Drive: 6 plays, 60 yards, 2:28.**
- NYJ – John Hall 24-yard field goal, 0:02. Jets 31–7. **Drive: 4 plays, 4 yards, 0:16.**

**Third quarter**

- NYJ – John Hall 32-yard field goal, 6:04. Jets 34–7. **Drive: 11 plays, 52 yards, 6:00.**
- SDG – LaDainian Tomlinson 7-yard run (kick blocked), 1:56. Jets 34–13. **Drive: 6 plays, 67 yards, 2:22.**

**Fourth quarter**

- NYJ – John Hall 38-yard field goal, 7:50. Jets 37–13. **Drive: 7 plays, 17 yards, 4:43.**
- NYJ – LaMont Jordan 61-yard run (John Hall kick), 1:49. Jets 44–13. **Drive: 8 plays, 90 yards, 3:31.**

**Top passers**

- NYJ – Chad Pennington – 28/37, 253 yards, TD
- SDG – Drew Brees – 22/35, 192 yards, TD, 2 INT

**Top rushers**

- NYJ – LaMont Jordan – 13 rushes, 107 yards, TD
- SDG – LaDainian Tomlinson – 12 rushes, 60 yards, TD

**Top receivers**

- NYJ – Laveranues Coles – 5 receptions, 60 yards
- SDG – Stephen Alexander – 7 receptions, 84 yards

Chargers coming off their bye week, sporting their throwback powder blue uniforms for the first time since 2000 in honor of Hall of Fame weekend, as New York led 7–0 in the 1st quarter when a Bennett punt had to be retaken due to an illegal use of hands penalty on Polk. Santana Moss took his second opportunity back 52 yards for a touchdown. By the time New York scored their third touchdown, the Charger offense had punted five times in five possessions, failing to cross midfield. San Diego did manage a 67-yard touchdown drive late in the half, helped by 30 yards on two Jets penalties and finished by Conway. However, Richey knocked the ensuing kickoff out of bounds, starting New York off at their own 40 yard line. They quickly drove for Curtis Martin's touchdown, and added a field goal after Brees was intercepted. Despite Tomlinson's touchdown, the Jets preserved their lead in the second half without difficulty. Safety Rodney Harrison was suspended and did not play due to an illegal hit on WR Jerry Rice two weeks prior. His number 37 was printed on the midfield helmet logo to symbolize his absence.

San Diego were only 1 of 9 on 3rd-down conversion attempts, and possessed the ball for under 23 minutes.

==== Week 10: at St. Louis Rams ====
Week 10: San Diego Chargers (6–2) at St. Louis Rams (3–5) – Game summary

Quarter	1	2	3	4	Total
Chargers	7	10	7	0	**24**
**Rams**	7	0	7	14	**28**

at Edward Jones Dome, St. Louis, Missouri

- Date: November 10
- Game time: 12:00 p.m. CST
- Game weather: N/A (game played indoors)
- Game attendance: 66,093
- Referee: Ed Hochuli
- TV announcers (CBS): Gus Johnson and Brent Jones
- Box score, Game Book

Game information

**First quarter**

- STL – Ernie Conwell 17-yard pass from Marc Bulger (Jeff Wilkins kick), 11:43. Rams 7–0. **Drive: 5 plays, 85 yards, 3:17.**
- SDG – Ryan McNeil 5-yard fumble return (Steve Christie kick), 7:36. Tied 7–7.

**Second quarter**

- SDG – Steve Christie 41-yard field goal, 14:01. Chargers 10–7. **Drive: 12 plays, 52 yards, 6:50.**
- SDG – LaDainian Tomlinson 1-yard run (Steve Christie kick), 8:54. Chargers 17–7. **Drive: 7 plays, 56 yards, 3:26.**

**Third quarter**

- STL – Isaac Bruce 27-yard pass from Marc Bulger (Jeff Wilkins kick), 9:12. Chargers 17–14. **Drive: 6 plays, 87 yards, 2:22.**
- SDG – Donnie Edwards 82-yard fumble return (Steve Christie kick), 5:09. Chargers 24–14.

**Fourth quarter**

- STL – Isaac Bruce 34-yard pass from Marc Bulger (Jeff Wilkins kick), 3:06. Chargers 24–21. **Drive: 6 plays, 94 yards, 1:52.**
- STL – Isaac Bruce 7-yard pass from Marc Bulger (Jeff Wilkins kick), 1:14. Rams 28–24. **Drive: 9 plays, 54 yards, 1:52.**

**Top passers**

- SDG – Drew Brees – 12/20, 139 yards, 2 INT
- STL – Marc Bulger – 36/48, 453 yards, 4 TD

**Top rushers**

- SDG – LaDainian Tomlinson – 24 rushes, 120 yards, TD
- STL – Marshall Faulk – 13 rushes, 36 yards

**Top receivers**

- SDG – Tim Dwight – 4 receptions, 53 yards
- STL – Isaac Bruce – 10 receptions, 163 yards, 3 TD

After a 3-yard run on the game's opening play, St. Louis had four consecutive gains of 17 or more yards as they took an early lead. San Diego had three consecutive false start penalties on their first drive, and had to punt. Two plays later, Molden forced a fumble at the Rams 25. McNeil knocked the loose ball downfield when he first tried to field it, but eventually made the recovery at the 5 and score the game-tying touchdown. Brees converted three 3rd downs over the next two Charger possessions, ending with a field goal and Tomlinson's touchdown run. St. Louis threatened to respond late in the half, with a 14-play, 82-yard, 8 minute drive. However, they came away with no points after Wiley forced Marshall Faulk to fumble at the Charger 4, and McNeil recovered again with 15 seconds on the clock.

On the Rams' first possession of the second half, Marc Bulger had back-to-back completions of 39 yards to Torry Holt and 27 yards to Isaac Bruce, the latter for a touchdown. Brees was soon intercepted, and St. Louis appeared poised to retake the lead when they reached a 1st and 10 at the Charger 15. Leber then forced Bruce to fumble, Edwards recovered and, aided by a block from Jammer, returned the ball 82 yards for another defensive touchdown. Bruce fumbled again early in the 4th quarter, this one forced by Seau and recovered by Carson. After Dwight dropped a pass at the Rams 10, Schottenheimer opted to punt from the St. Louis 32 rather than have Christie attempt a long field goal. On their next possession, Tomlinson's 30-yard run gave San Diego a 1st down at the St. Louis 24, but they were pushed back by two offensive holding penalties and eventually punted from the 33. Starting with five minutes left and with no timeouts to work with, the Rams drove 94 yards in under two minutes to get back into the game with Bruce's juggling touchdown catch. Following an onside kick, Holt's 11-yard catch converted a 3rd and 4 from the Charger 35 and Bruce scored his third touchdown with 74 seconds to play and the Chargers holding one timeout. Jenkins returned the ensuing kickoff 52 yards to the Rams 46, and Brees converted a 4th and 12 with an 18-yard completion to Caldwell, moving the ball to the 30. From there, Brees took two shots at the end zone, the second of which was intercepted with 11 seconds to play.

As of 2022, this is the only game in which the Chargers have scored two fumble returns touchdowns. San Diego's four fumble recoveries kept them in a game in which they were outgained by 524 yards to 256, and gave up four drives of over 80 yards.

==== Week 11: vs. San Francisco 49ers ====
Week 11: San Francisco 49ers (7–2) at San Diego Chargers (6–3) – Game summary

Quarter	1	2	3	4	OT	Total
49ers	0	7	10	0	0	**17**
**Chargers**	7	0	0	10	3	**20**

at Qualcomm Stadium, San Diego, California

- Date: November 17
- Game time: 1:05 p.m. PST
- Game weather: 72 °F (22 °C), relative humidity 54%, wind 9 mph
- Game attendance: 67,161
- Referee: Mike Carey
- TV announcers (Fox): Joe Buck, Cris Collinsworth and Troy Aikman
- Box score, Game Book

Game information

**First quarter**

- SDG – Reche Caldwell 4-yard pass from Drew Brees (Steve Christie kick), 0:40. Chargers 7–0. **Drive: 10 plays, 80 yards, 4:40.**

**Second quarter**

- SF – Terrell Owens 32-yard pass from Jeff Garcia (Jose Cortez kick), 1:04. Tied 7–7. **Drive: 5 plays, 69 yards, 1:32.**

**Third quarter**

- SF – Terrell Owens 76-yard pass from Jeff Garcia (Jose Cortez kick), 14:06. 49ers 14–7. **Drive: 3 plays, 80 yards, 0:54.**
- SF – Jose Cortez 24-yard field goal, 6:38. 49ers 17–7. **Drive: 11 plays, 41 yards, 5:20.**

**Fourth quarter**

- SDG – Steve Christie 36-yard field goal, 5:05. 49ers 17–10. **Drive: 7 plays, 62 yards, 2:33.**
- SDG – Fred McCrary 1-yard pass from Drew Brees (Steve Christie kick), 0:31. Tied 17–17. **Drive: 11 plays, 58 yards, 2:51.**

**Overtime**

- SDG – Steve Christie 40-yard field goal, 4:11. Chargers 20–17. **Drive: 9 plays, 47 yards, 4:35.**

**Top passers**

- SF – Jeff Garcia – 25/43, 337 yards, 2 TD, INT
- SDG – Drew Brees – 29/50, 336 yards, 2 TD, INT

**Top rushers**

- SF – Garrison Hearst – 12 rushes, 66 yards
- SDG – LaDainian Tomlinson – 24 rushes, 88 yards

**Top receivers**

- SF – Terrell Owens – 7 receptions, 171 yards, 2 TD
- SDG – Curtis Conway – 7 receptions, 152 yards

After each side punted on their opening possession, San Diego drove 80 yards to take the lead through Caldwell: Conway's 31-yard catch was the longest play. Six more punts followed before San Francisco tied the game late in the half. Terrell Owens opened the drive with a 31-yard catch and closed it with a 32-yard touchdown on 4th and 4. Brees completed 3 passes for 33 yards as he drove San Diego into field goal range, but Christie's 44-yard attempt was blocked as the half ended.

Three plays into the second half, Owens beat Molden up the left sideline and eluded Beckett to complete his second touchdown. The 49ers drove as far as the Charger 5 on their next drive, where Seau made a backfield tackle on 3rd and 1, leading to a field goal. Trailing 17–7, the Chargers survived a Tomlinson fumble on the next drive when Jason Ball recovered. Tomlinson later converted a 3rd and 14 with a 16-yard catch, then moved the ball to the 49er 35 with a 27-yard run up the middle. From there, Conway appeared to have scored on a deep pass up the right sideline, but he had been driven out of bounds before coming back in to make the catch, negating the score and soon leading to a punt. San Diego opened their next drive with a 21-yard run for Tomlinson and a 47-yard catch for Conway, but Brees underthrew a pass and was intercepted on 2nd and goal from the 4. Conway's 41-yard catch soon had the Chargers back into San Francisco territory. This time, they reached a 4th and 1 at the San Francisco 18, and Schottenheimer opted for a field goal, which Christie converted with 5:05 to play. The defense forced a three-and-out, and San Diego reached a 4th and 3 at the San Francisco 15 just after the two minute warning. Brees evaded two potential sacks before finding Dwight for 7 yards. Three incompletions followed, but Caldwell drew pass interference in the end zone on the last of these. McCrary was open in the end zone for the game-tying touchdown two plays later. The 49ers still had time to drive to the Charger 46, but Jeff Garcia's shot at the end zone was intercepted by Harrison as time expired.

San Diego won the overtime coin toss and received, but Brees threw three consecutive incompletions and they were forced to punt. Garcia then converted a 3rd and 12 as he led his team from their own 24 to the Charger 23, but Jose Cortez's 41-yard field was easily wide right. Brees converted a 3rd and 8 with a 19-yard pass to Dwight, and added an 18-yarder to Eric Parker. Following three Tomlinson runs for 6 yards, Christie won the game with a 40-yard field goal.

==== Week 12: at Miami Dolphins ====
Week 12: San Diego Chargers (7–3) at Miami Dolphins (6–4) – Game summary

Quarter	1	2	3	4	Total
Chargers	3	0	0	0	**3**
**Dolphins**	10	10	7	3	**30**

at Pro Player Stadium, Miami Gardens, Florida

- Date: November 24
- Game time: 1:00 p.m. EST
- Game weather: 77 °F (25 °C), relative humidity 59%, wind 9 mph
- Game attendance: 73,138
- Referee: Jeff Triplette
- TV announcers (CBS): Greg Gumbel, Phil Simms and Armen Keteyian
- Box score, Game Book

Game information

**First quarter**

- MIA – Olindo Mare 20-yard field goal, 10:06. Dolphins 3–0. **Drive: 8 plays, 29 yards, 4:01.**
- SDG – Steve Christie 38-yard field goal, 4:27. Tied 3–3. **Drive: 10 plays, 57 yards, 5:39.**
- MIA – James McKnight 20-yard pass from Ray Lucas (Olindo Mare kick), 1:43. Dolphins 10–3. **Drive: 6 plays, 60 yards, 2:44.**

**Second quarter**

- MIA – Ricky Williams 1-yard run (Olindo Mare kick), 6:45. Dolphins 17–3. **Drive: 14 plays, 86 yards, 7:24.**
- MIA – Olindo Mare 38-yard field goal, 0:15. Dolphins 20–3. **Drive: 13 plays, 48 yards, 2:43.**

**Third quarter**

- MIA – Ricky Williams 12-yard run (Olindo Mare kick), 2:14. Dolphins 27–3. **Drive: 4 plays, 28 yards, 2:04.**

**Fourth quarter**

- MIA – Olindo Mare 23-yard field goal, 13:02. Dolphins 30–3. **Drive: 6 plays, 83 yards, 2:52.**

**Top passers**

- SDG – Drew Brees – 15/22, 107 yards, INT
- MIA – Ray Lucas – 14/23, 194 yards, TD

**Top rushers**

- SDG – LaDainian Tomlinson – 14 rushes, 45 yards
- MIA – Ricky Williams – 29 rushes, 143 yards, 2 TD

**Top receivers**

- SDG – Stephen Alexander – 8 receptions, 61 yards
- MIA – James McKnight – 3 receptions, 111 yards, TD

Brees' first pass attempt of the game was intercepted by Zach Thomas, leading to a short Dolphins field goal after the Charger defense mounted a goal line stand. Christie tied the score on the next drive, but Miami took control with touchdowns on their next two drives. Following a missed 42-yard kick from Christie, the Dolphins added a field goal for their fourth score in four possessions, and a 20–3 halftime lead. With the Chargers managing only 3 first downs and 43 yards over their five-second half possessions, Miami won with ease.

The Dolphins dominated in several statistical areas. They outgained the Chargers by 413 yards of offense to 144, and controlled the clock for nearly 36 minutes with a running attack that gained 222 yards on 44 carries.

==== Week 13: vs. Denver Broncos ====
Week 13: Denver Broncos (7–4) at San Diego Chargers (7–4) – Game summary

Quarter	1	2	3	4	OT	Total
Broncos	10	7	7	3	0	**27**
**Chargers**	0	24	0	3	3	**30**

at Qualcomm Stadium, San Diego, California

- Date: December 1
- Game time: 1:05 p.m. PST
- Game weather: 65 °F (18 °C), relative humidity 68%, wind 7 mph
- Game attendance: 66,357
- Referee: Tony Corrente
- TV announcers (CBS): Dick Enberg, Dan Dierdorf and Bonnie Bernstein
- Box score, Game Book

Game information

**First quarter**

- DEN – Jason Elam 54-yard field goal, 6:44. Broncos 3–0. **Drive: 7 plays, 44 yards, 3:19.**
- DEN – Clinton Portis 43-yard run (Jason Elam kick), 0:20. Broncos 10–0. **Drive: 3 plays, 68 yards, 1:10.**

**Second quarter**

- SDG – LaDainian Tomlinson 3-yard run (Steve Christie kick), 14:56. Broncos 10–7. **Drive: 2 plays, 82 yards, 0:24.**
- SDG – LaDainian Tomlinson 1-yard run (Steve Christie kick), 9:26. Chargers 14–10. **Drive: 5 plays, 41 yards, 2:11.**
- SDG – LaDainian Tomlinson 5-yard run (Steve Christie kick), 4:38. Chargers 21–10. **Drive: 6 plays, 17 yards, 3:52.**
- DEN – Clinton Portis 8-yard run (Jason Elam kick), 3:08. Chargers 21–17. **Drive: 3 plays, 60 yards, 1:30.**
- SDG – Steve Christie 20-yard field goal, 0:07. Chargers 24–17. **Drive: 11 plays, 67 yards, 3:01.**

**Third quarter**

- DEN – Reuben Droughns 22-yard pass from Steve Beuerlein (Jason Elam kick), 9:39. Tied 24–24. **Drive: 10 plays, 65 yards, 5:21.**

**Fourth quarter**

- SDG – Steve Christie 40-yard field goal, 13:12. Chargers 27–24. **Drive: 4 plays, 8 yards, 1:42.**
- DEN – Jason Elam 24-yard field goal, 1:39. Tied 27–27. **Drive: 11 plays, 53 yards, 3:28.**

**Overtime**

- SDG – Steve Christie 27-yard field goal, 3:01. Chargers 30–27. **Drive: 9 plays, 48 yards, 4:25.**

**Top passers**

- DEN – Steve Beuerlein – 22/39, 288 yards, TD, 2 INT
- SDG – Drew Brees – 27/41, 217 yards

**Top rushers**

- DEN – Clinton Portis – 23 rushes, 159 yards, 2 TD
- SDG – LaDainian Tomlinson – 37 rushes, 220 yards, 3 TD

**Top receivers**

- DEN – Ed McCaffrey – 7 receptions, 126 yards
- SDG – LaDainian Tomlinson – 11 receptions, 51 yards

Trailing to Elam's early field goal, San Diego moved into Denver territory with Parker's 30-yard catch-and-run. Three Brees incompletions followed, and Christie's 42-yard field goal missed to the left. Denver extended their lead three plays later when Clinton Portis burst through a hole in the line and raced untouched for a 43-yard touchdown. Tomlinson responded on the next play from scrimmage. On 1st down from the Charger 18, he took a pitch around left end, threaded through traffic and broke a tackle at the 30 before breaking clear along the sideline for a 76-yard gain. He was tackled by the face mask at the Denver 6, leading to a penalty flag and the ball moving to the 3. Tomlinson scored from there on the next play. Following a 28-yard Denver punt, San Diego started their next drive on the Denver 41. Tomlinson started the drive with a 24-yard run and finished it with a 1-yard touchdown. Three plays later, DeQuincy Scott sacked Steve Beuerlein, forcing a fumble that Adrian Dingle recovered. The ensuing Charger drive was twice prolonged by 3rd down penalties, and ended with Tomlinson's third touchdown in as many drives. Richey then knocked the kickoff out of bounds, starting Denver at their own 40; Ed McCaffrey had a 47-yard catch and Portis scored two plays later. Christie's chip shot field goal made it 24–17 at halftime.

Denver tied the score on the opening possession of the second half. Reuben Droughns had a 7-yard touchdown on 2nd and goal negated by a chop block penalty, but immediately came back with a 22-yard touchdown after breaking tackles by Leber and Harrison. Molden intercepted Beuerlein on the first play of the 4th quarter, setting up a Christie field goal. Edwards soon added another interception, but Brees was stopped for no gain on 4th and 1 from the Denver 21. Dwight's 23-yard punt return set up another scoring opportunity, but Christie missed a 49-yard field goal. Beuerlein and McCaffrey combined to convert a 4th and 6 before Denver tied the score again with a field goal. Neither team crossed midfield on their final possession of regulation time, and the game went to overtime.

The Broncos won the coin toss and received, but went three-and-out after a Wiley sack on 3rd down. Four runs by Tomlinson covered 40 yards, and Christie came on for a 38-yard field goal try; Denver blocked his low kick, and the game went on. A McCaffrey catch on 3rd and 10 moved the ball into Chargers territory, and Elam had a chance to win it, but was wide left from 53 yards. A 20-yard catch by Alexander was the longest play of the game's final drive, which ended with Christie's 27-yard game-winner nearly 12 minutes into overtime.

Tomlinson's 220 rushing yards broke the franchise record he had tied in Week 4. His 271 offensive yards were a franchise record for a regular season game. (Note: Keith Lincoln had 329 yards in the 1963 AFL Championship Game.) With 48 touches, he broke the franchise record he had set in Week 7 and tied James Wilder's NFL record.

==== Week 14: vs. Oakland Raiders ====
Week 14: Oakland Raiders (8–4) at San Diego Chargers (8–4) – Game summary

Quarter	1	2	3	4	Total
**Raiders**	10	3	7	7	**27**
Chargers	0	7	0	0	**7**

at Qualcomm Stadium, San Diego, California

- Date: December 8
- Game time: 1:15 p.m. PST
- Game weather: 67 °F (19 °C), relative humidity 61%, wind 8 mph
- Game attendance: 67,968
- Referee: Dick Hantak
- TV announcers (CBS): Kevin Harlan, Randy Cross and Beasley Reece
- Box score, Game Book

Game information

**First quarter**

- OAK – Charlie Garner 4-yard run (Sebastian Janikowski kick), 11:12. Raiders 7–0. **Drive: 6 plays, 36 yards, 3:48.**
- OAK – Sebastian Janikowski 51-yard field goal, 5:00. Raiders 10–0. **Drive: 6 plays, 41 yards, 3:18.**

**Second quarter**

- SDG – LaDainian Tomlinson 1-yard run (Steve Christie kick), 5:04. Raiders 10–7. **Drive: 7 plays, 45 yards, 4:10.**
- OAK – Sebastian Janikowski 20-yard field goal, 0:13. Raiders 13–7. **Drive: 10 plays, 49 yards, 1:37.**

**Third quarter**

- OAK – Zack Crockett 1-yard run (Sebastian Janikowski kick), 2:12. Raiders 20–7. **Drive: 8 plays, 87 yards, 5:02.**

**Fourth quarter**

- OAK – Tyrone Wheatley 4-yard run (Sebastian Janikowski kick), 7:25. Raiders 27–7. **Drive: 13 plays, 76 yards, 7:24.**

**Top passers**

- OAK – Rich Gannon – 26/41, 328 yards
- SDG – Drew Brees – 22/41, 239 yards, 3 INT

**Top rushers**

- OAK – Tyrone Wheatley – 9 rushes, 28 yards, TD
- SDG – LaDainian Tomlinson – 18 rushes, 57 yards, TD

**Top receivers**

- OAK – Jerry Rice – 7 receptions, 113 yards
- SDG – Eric Parker – 7 receptions, 96 yards

Tied atop the AFC West at 8–4 going into this game, the Chargers and Raiders again met with first place at stake. Oakland went ahead to stay with 10 points on their first two drives; San Diego opened the game with three punts and an interception. In the 2nd quarter, their defense forced three consecutive incompletions by Gannon from his own 11 yard line, and a 34-yard punt set the Chargers up in Oakland territory. Parker had a 17-yard catch on 3rd and 8 and drew pass interference in the end zone, with Tomlinson scoring two plays after the penalty. Janikowski missed a 49-yard field goal on the next drive, but a tipped Brees pass was intercepted three plays later, and Janikowski made a 20-yard chip shot late in the half.

San Diego went for it on 4th and 1 from the Raider 31 early in the second half, but Tomlinson was swarmed behind the line of scrimmage and lost 3 yards. Dwight soon gave them another chance when he returned a Raider punt 37 yards to the Oakland 47. The Chargers picked up a 1st down on the 30, whereupon Brees was intercepted again. A 56-yard catch by Rice on 3rd and 6 then sparked the first of two consecutive Raider touchdown drives. San Diego drove inside the Oakland 10 twice in the final minutes, but Brees threw incomplete on 4th down and Jesse Chatman was tackled at the 1 as time expired.

==== Week 15: at Buffalo Bills ====
Week 15: San Diego Chargers (8–5) at Buffalo Bills (6–7) – Game summary

Quarter	1	2	3	4	Total
Chargers	3	7	0	3	**13**
**Bills**	7	6	0	7	**20**

at Ralph Wilson Stadium, Orchard Park, New York

- Date: December 15
- Game time: 1:00 p.m. EST
- Game weather: 37 °F (3 °C), relative humidity 86%, wind 15 mph, wind chill 27
- Game attendance: 61,838
- Referee: Gerald Austin
- TV announcers (CBS): Ian Eagle and Solomon Wilcots
- Game book, Game Book

Game information

**First quarter**

- SDG – Steve Christie 39-yard field goal, 6:49. Chargers 3–0. **Drive: 5 plays, 40 yards, 2:31.**
- BUF – Travis Henry 4-yard run (Mike Hollis kick), 3:13. Bills 7–3. **Drive: 7 plays, 74 yards, 3:36.**

**Second quarter**

- BUF – Mike Hollis 42-yard field goal, 9:05. Bills 10–3. **Drive: 7 plays, 41 yards, 2:57.**
- SDG – LaDainian Tomlinson 2-yard run (Steve Christie kick), 3:21. Tied 10–10. **Drive: 9 plays, 83 yards, 5:44.**
- BUF – Mike Hollis 36-yard field goal, 1:08. Bills 13–10. **Drive: 7 plays, 17 yards, 2:13.**

**Third quarter**

- No scoring plays.

**Fourth quarter**

- SDG – Steve Christie 53-yard field goal, 5:45. Tied 13–13. **Drive: 5 plays, 53 yards, 2:38.**
- BUF – Travis Henry 26-yard run (Mike Hollis kick), 0:52. Bills 20–13. **Drive: 7 plays, 64 yards, 2:12.**

**Top passers**

- SDG – Drew Brees – 13/24, 148 yards
- BUF – Drew Bledsoe – 11/33, 107 yards

**Top rushers**

- SDG – LaDainian Tomlinson – 28 rushes, 110 yards, TD
- BUF – Travis Henry – 22 rushes, 144 yards, 2 TD

**Top receivers**

- SDG – Tim Dwight – 5 receptions, 81 yards
- BUF – Eric Moulds – 5 receptions, 61 yards

Tomlinson's 31-yard run set up the opening points for Christie. Buffalo responded with a Travis Henry's first touchdown, set up by pass interference penalties of 26 yards on Harrison and 11 yards on Molden, both converting 3rd downs. Dwight moved his team into Buffalo territory with a 42-yard catch in the 2nd quarter but Christie, kicking into the strong wind, was short from 44 yards. Another pass interference penalty on Molden, this one covering 21 yards, helped position Mike Hollis for his first field goal. San Diego then drove 83 yards to tie the score: Brees converted two 3rd downs with passes, Conway drew a 35-yard pass interference penalty, and Tomlinson scored from the 2. Christie's kickoff went only 45 yards and was run back 35 yards, setting up another Hollis field goal and a halftime Bills lead.

San Diego reached the Bills 48 on the first possession of the second half, but Brees was sacked no consecutive plays and they were forced to punt. Harrison forced Henry to fumble on the next play, with McNeil recovering. The Chargers then reached a 4th and 4 at the Buffalo 23; with the wind still against them, Schottenheimer opted to go for it, but Brees' pass was incomplete. Late in the 3rd quarter, Alexander's 31-yard catch moved the ball to the Buffalo 40. From there, the Chargers tried an elaborate trick play, with pitches from Brees to Tomlinson to Dwight and back to Brees. The last of these went to ground, with Brees covering the ball for a loss of 16, soon leading to another punt. Doug Flutie came in for Brees for the first time all season with 8 minutes to play as he received a mixed reaction of boos and cheers from the Buffalo fans, and immediately went deep for Conway, who juggled the ball before bring it in for a 47-yard gain. That set up a 53-yard field goal for Christie; this time, with the wind at his back, he was successful. After an exchange of punts, Henry rushed 5 times for 53 yards on the game-winning drive. Fletcher fielded a short kickoff and returned it 22 yards to midfield. The Chargers advanced to the 37, from where Flutie's final two passes were incomplete in the end zone.

Both teams struggled on 3rd down, with Buffalo converting 2 of 12 while San Diego made 5 of 18. The Chargers gave up 9 penalties for 120 yards.

==== Week 16: at Kansas City Chiefs ====
Week 16: San Diego Chargers (8–6) at Kansas City Chiefs (7–7) – Game summary

Quarter	1	2	3	4	Total
Chargers	3	3	9	7	**22**
**Chiefs**	7	7	7	3	**24**

at Arrowhead Stadium, Kansas City, Missouri

- Date: December 22
- Game time: 12:00 p.m. CST
- Game weather: 33 °F (1 °C), relative humidity 54%, wind 6 mph, wind chill 26
- Game attendance: 77,899
- Referee: Ron Winter
- TV announcers (CBS): Gus Johnson and Brent Jones
- Box score, Game Book

Game information

**First quarter**

- KC – Marc Boerigter 8-yard pass from Trent Green (Michael Husted kick), 5:11. Chiefs 7–0. **Drive: 10 plays, 66 yards, 5:19.**
- SDG – Steve Christie 30-yard field goal, 2:01. Chiefs 7–3. **Drive: 8 plays, 60 yards, 3:10.**

**Second quarter**

- KC – Omar Easy 6-yard pass from Trent Green (Michael Husted kick), 1:15. Chiefs 14–3. **Drive: 13 plays, 88 yards, 6:45.**
- SDG – Steve Christie 49-yard field goal, 0:14. Chiefs 14–6. **Drive: 7 plays, 35 yards, 1:01.**

**Third quarter**

- KC – Marc Boerigter 99-yard pass from Trent Green (Michael Husted kick), 5:11. Chiefs 21–6. **Drive: 1 play, 98 yards, 0:13.**
- SDG – Tim Dwight 9-yard pass from Drew Brees (pass failed), 7:35. Chiefs 21–12. **Drive: 7 plays, 71 yards, 3:21.**
- SDG – Steve Christie 24-yard field goal, 2:27. Chiefs 21–15. **Drive: 8 plays, 64 yards, 2:59.**

**Fourth quarter**

- SDG – Fred McCrary 3-yard pass from Drew Brees (Steve Christie kick), 10:58. Chargers 22–21. **Drive: 9 plays, 79 yards, 4:30.**
- KC – Michael Husted 38-yard field goal, 1:08. Chiefs 24–22. **Drive: 13 plays, 77 yards, 4:15.**

**Top passers**

- SDG – Drew Brees – 26/40, 242 yards, 2 TD
- KC – Trent Green – 23/36, 337 yards, 3 TD, INT

**Top rushers**

- SDG – LaDainian Tomlinson – 24 rushes, 131 yards
- KC – Mike Cloud – 16 rushes, 19 yards
  KC – Derrick Blaylock – 2 rushes, 19 yards

**Top receivers**

- SDG – Tim Dwight – 6 receptions, 63 yards, TD
- KC – Marc Boerigter – 5 receptions, 144 yards, 2 TD

San Diego attempted a 4th and 8 on the Chiefs 34 on their first drive, but Brees threw incomplete. Kansas City then drove 66 yards for Boerigter's first touchdown. Tomlinson's 34-yard run set up Christie's first field goal in response. Kansas City's second touchdown drive featured four 3rd downs, all converted by Green passes. Caldwell's 26-yard reception helped position the Chargers for another Christie field goal, 14 seconds before halftime.

Early in the 3rd quarter, Bennett pinned the Chiefs at their own 2 with a 39-yard punt, and a false start penalty backed them up to the 1-yard line. Green and Boerigter then combined for the ninth 99-yard touchdown pass in NFL history. Boerigter got behind Beckett, made the catch at the Kansas City 40, and won a footrace to the end zone. Brees responded by going 5 of 5 for 52 yards and a touchdown to Dwight; Caldwell was stopped short of the goal line on a two-point conversion try, leaving the deficit at nine points. After Chiefs punted, Brees had completions of 21 and 24 yards on a field goal drive. Another Chiefs punt followed, and Brees went 4 for 4 for 50 yards and the go-ahead touchdown to McCrary, making it three consecutive scoring drives for the Chargers. Lyle intercepted Green on the next play from scrimmage, but the Chargers were forced to punt. Two further punts followed, with Bennett's 58-yarder pinning Kansas City at their own 3 with 5:23 to play. Green started their winning drive with a 32-yard completion to Gonzalez, and later converted a 3rd and 8. The Chiefs reached a 4th and 1 at the Charger 37 and went for it; Mike Cloud was judged to have gained the necessary yardage by about an inch, and San Diego were charged their final time-out after unsuccessfully challenging the call. Michael Husted hit the game-winner with 68 seconds to play. Brees scrambled for 15 yards to midfield, then completed a 5-yard pass to Caldwell, who lost a fumble with 33 seconds to play.

It was Seau's 200th appearance for San Diego, and would prove to be his last, as he missed the finale through an ankle injury and was traded to Miami in the offseason. The defeat left the Chargers as long-shots to make the playoffs, needing defeats for at least four other teams regardless of how they performed in their own final game.

==== Week 17: vs. Seattle Seahawks ====
Week 17: Seattle Seahawks (6–9) at San Diego Chargers (8–7) – Game summary

Quarter	1	2	3	4	OT	Total
**Seahawks**	7	0	0	21	3	**31**
Chargers	0	10	10	8	0	**28**

at Qualcomm Stadium, San Diego, California

- Date: December 29
- Game time: 1:15 p.m. PST
- Game weather: 61 °F (16 °C), relative humidity 87%, wind 8 mph
- Game attendance: 52,159
- Referee: Bill Leavy
- TV announcers (FOX): Ron Pitts, Marv Levy and Brent Ringenbach
- Box score, Game Book

Game information

**First quarter**

- SEA – Darrell Jackson 14-yard pass from Matt Hasselbeck (Rian Lindell kick), 10:49. Seahawks 7–0. **Drive: 8 plays, 79 yards, 4:11.**

**Second quarter**

- SDG – Stephen Alexander 26-yard pass from Drew Brees (Steve Christie kick), 11:59. Tied 7–7. **Drive: 9 plays, 79 yards, 3:42.**
- SDG – Steve Christie 26-yard field goal, 8:21. Chargers 10–7. **Drive: 6 plays, 41 yards, 2:27.**

**Third quarter**

- SDG – Steve Christie 29-yard field goal, 12:06. Chargers 13–7. **Drive: 7 plays, 57 yards, 2:54.**
- SDG – Eric Parker 31-yard pass from Drew Brees (Steve Christie kick), 0:59. Chargers 20–7. **Drive: 9 plays, 80 yards, 4:29.**

**Fourth quarter**

- SEA – Shaun Alexander 2-yard run (Rian Lindell kick), 13:59. Chargers 20–14. **Drive: 5 plays, 63 yards, 2:00.**
- SDG – Fred McCrary 1-yard pass from Drew Brees (Drew Brees–Reche Caldwell pass), 8:37. Chargers 28–14. **Drive: 12 plays, 73 yards, 5:22.**
- SEA – Koren Robinson 19-yard pass from Matt Hasselbeck (Rian Lindell kick), 6:14. Chargers 28–21. **Drive: 5 plays, 58 yards, 2:23.**
- SEA – Matt Hasselbeck 1-yard run (Rian Lindell kick), 0:01. Tied 28–28. **Drive: 17 plays, 88 yards, 3:31.**

**Overtime**

- SEA – Rian Lindell 24-yard field goal, 5:02. Seahawks 31–28. **Drive: 10 plays, 46 yards, 4:52.**

**Top passers**

- SEA – Matt Hasselbeck – 36/53, 449 yards, 2 TD, 2 INT
- SDG – Drew Brees – 27/49, 332 yards, 3 TD, INT

**Top rushers**

- SEA – Shaun Alexander – 15 rushes, 67 yards, TD
- SDG – LaDainian Tomlinson – 17 rushes, 67 yards

**Top receivers**

- SEA – Itula Mili – 7 receptions, 119 yards
- SDG – Stephen Alexander – 8 receptions, 129 yards, TD

**Team** – pass – rush – total – to

- SEA – 449 – 163 – 591 – 3
- SDG – 352 – 88 – 414 – 1

San Diego was eliminated from playoff contention shortly before its game kicked off, when the Cleveland Browns won. When their own game started, the Chargers fell behind to a touchdown on the opening drive. Moreno stopped the next Seattle drive with an interception, while the Chargers gained only one 1st down on their first three drives. They tied the score early in the 2nd quarter on a drive where Brees was 4 of 5 for 67 yards and a touchdown to Alexander. Christie added a field goal on the next drive, and San Diego led at halftime after Lyle forced a fumble that Molden recovered at the Charger 11.

On the opening possession of the second half, a 29-yard completion from Brees to Alexander was followed by a trick play, with Caldwell passing to Dwight for 20 more yards; those plays led to Christie's second field goal. On their next drive, Brees had a 30-yard completion to Alexander and a 31-yard touchdown to Parker. Matt Hasselbeck had a 49-yard completion as Seattle responded quickly with a Shaun Alexander touchdown. San Diego drove into Seattle territory, and converted a 3rd and 3 from the 9 when Alexander drew pass interference. McCrary's touchdown came two plays later, and Caldwell's two-point conversion extended the lead to fourteen points with 8:37 to play. The Seahawks took only five plays to respond via Hasselbeck's second touchdown pass of the game. San Diego gained two 1st downs before being forced to punt with under four minutes to play. On the ensuing 17-play drive, Hasselbeck passed sixteen times, ran four times and was sacked once. He converted a 4th and 1 with a 4-yard scramble and ran in the game-tying touchdown with a single second on the clock.

Seattle won the overtime coin toss, received the ball and reached a 3rd and 7 at the Charger 28 before being stopped by a Molden interception. However, Brees threw two incompletions and was sacked, forcing a punt. Hasselbeck then ran for 21 yards on a 3rd and 12, eventually leading to Rian Lindell's game-winning kick.

=== Standings ===
AFC West
	W	L	T	PCT	DIV	CONF	PF	PA	STK
^{(1)} Oakland Raiders	11	5	0	.688	4–2	9–3	450	304	W2
Denver Broncos	9	7	0	.563	3–3	5–7	392	344	W1
San Diego Chargers	8	8	0	.500	3–3	6–6	333	367	L4
Kansas City Chiefs	8	8	0	.500	2–4	6–6	467	399	L1

==== Conference ====
AFC
#	Team	Division	W	L	T	PCT	DIV	CONF	SOS	SOV
**Division leaders**
1 (Note: Oakland finished ahead of Tennessee based on head-to-head victory.)	Oakland Raiders	West	11	5	0	.688	4–2	9–3	.529	.531
2	Tennessee Titans	South	11	5	0	.688	6–0	9–3	.479	.474
3	Pittsburgh Steelers	North	10	5	1	.656	6–0	8–4	.486	.451
4 (Note: N.Y. Jets finished ahead of New England based on win percentage in common games (8–4 to 7–5) after both finished ahead of Miami based on division record (4–2 to 2–4).)	New York Jets	East	9	7	0	.563	4–2	6–6	.500	.500
**Wild Cards**
5	Indianapolis Colts	South	10	6	0	.625	4–2	8–4	.479	.400
6 (Note: Cleveland finished ahead of Denver and New England based on conference record (7–5 vs 5–7/6–6))	Cleveland Browns	North	9	7	0	.563	3–3	7–5	.486	.413
**Did not qualify for the postseason**
7 (Note: Denver finished ahead of New England based on head-to-head victory.)	Denver Broncos	West	9	7	0	.563	3–3	5–7	.527	.486
8 (Note: New England finished ahead of Miami based on division record (4–2 to 2–4).)	New England Patriots	East	9	7	0	.563	4–2	6–6	.525	.455
9	Miami Dolphins	East	9	7	0	.563	2–4	7–5	.508	.486
10 (Note: Buffalo finished ahead of San Diego based on head-to-head victory.)	Buffalo Bills	East	8	8	0	.500	2–4	5–7	.473	.352
11 (Note: San Diego finished ahead of Kansas City based on division record (3–3 to 2–4).)	San Diego Chargers	West	8	8	0	.500	3–3	6–6	.492	.453
12	Kansas City Chiefs	West	8	8	0	.500	2–4	6–6	.527	.516
13	Baltimore Ravens	North	7	9	0	.438	3–3	7–5	.506	.384
14	Jacksonville Jaguars	South	6	10	0	.375	1–5	4–8	.506	.438
15	Houston Texans	South	4	12	0	.250	1–5	2–10	.518	.492
16	Cincinnati Bengals	North	2	14	0	.125	0–6	1–11	.537	.406
**Tiebreakers** (Note: When breaking ties for three or more teams under the NFL's rules, they are first broken within divisions, then comparing only the highest ranked remaining team from each division.)

== Awards ==
Three Chargers were named to the 2003 Pro Bowl, two of whom were also named to the Associated Press All-Pro team.

Player	Position	Pro Bowl starter	Pro Bowl reserve	Pro Bowl alternate	AP 1st team All-Pro	AP 2nd team All-Pro
Donnie Edwards	Linebacker			Yes		Yes
Junior Seau	Linebacker	Yes				
LaDainian Tomlinson	Running back		Yes			Yes
