= 2003 San Diego Chargers season =

NFL team 44th season

- Owner: Alex Spanos
- General manager: A. J. Smith
- Head coach: Marty Schottenheimer
- Home stadium: Qualcomm Stadium

Results
- Record: 4–12
- Division place: 4th AFC West
- Playoffs: Did not qualify
- All-Pros: 1: RB LaDainian Tomlinson (2nd team)
- Pro Bowlers: None

The 2003 San Diego Chargers season was the franchise's 34th season in the National Football League (NFL), its 44th overall and the second under head coach Marty Schottenheimer. They finished the campaign last in their division with only four wins and earned the #1 pick in the 2004 NFL draft. They played one “home” game during the season, against the Miami Dolphins, at Sun Devil Stadium in Tempe, Arizona where the Arizona Cardinals played, due to the Cedar Fire. The team declined from the previous season, as the Chargers won four games and surrendered the second most points per game (27.6), trailing only the Arizona Cardinals during the season. It was the worst season of Schottenheimer's career, and also his fourth consecutive non-winning season in the NFL, but also his final losing season as a coach.

On April 11, 2003, general manager John Butler died from lymphoma and A. J. Smith, a former assistant to Butler, took over the position for the next 10 seasons; during the season the Chargers wore a patch on their jerseys with the initials "JB" to commemorate John Butler.

For the first time since 1989, Junior Seau was not on the opening day roster.

== NFL draft ==
2003 San Diego Chargers draft
Round	Pick	Player	Position	College	Notes
1	30	Sammy Davis	CB	Texas A&M	Pick from PHI
2	46	Drayton Florence	CB	Tuskegee	
2	62	Terrence Kiel	S	Texas A&M	Pick from GB
3	80	Courtney Van Buren	OT	Arkansas–Pine Bluff	
4	112	Matt Wilhelm	LB	Ohio St	
5	149	Mike Scifres	P	Western Illinois	
6	188	Hanik Milligan *	S	Houston	
7	229	Andrew Pinnock	FB	South Carolina	
Made roster † Pro Football Hall of Fame * Made at least one Pro Bowl during career

== Personnel ==
=== Staff ===
2003 San Diego Chargers staff
Front office: Owner – Alex Spanos; President/chief executive officer – Dean Spanos; Executive vice president – Michael Spanos; Executive vice president/general manager – A. J. Smith; Assistant general manager/director of player personnel – Buddy Nix; Vice president of football operations – Ed McGuire; Director of college scouting – Jimmy Raye; Director of pro scouting – Fran Foley; Head coaches: Head coach – Marty Schottenheimer; Offensive coaches: Offensive coordinator – Cam Cameron; Quarterbacks – Brian Schottenheimer; Running backs – Clarence Shelmon; Wide receivers – James Lofton; Tight ends – Tim Brewster; Offensive line – Hudson Houck; Offensive assistant/quality control – Pete Carmichael, Jr.	Defensive coaches: Defensive coordinator – Dale Lindsey; Defensive line – Wayne Nunnely; Linebackers – Greg Manusky; Defensive backs – Jerry Holmes; Defensive assistant/quality control – John Pagano; Special teams coaches: Special teams – Steve Crosby; Strength and conditioning: Strength and conditioning – Dave Redding; Assistant strength and conditioning – Matt Schiotz

=== Roster ===
2003 San Diego Chargers roster
Quarterbacks (QB): 9 Drew Brees; 7 Doug Flutie; Running backs (RB): 24 Jesse Chatman; 35 Leon Johnson KR/PR; 41 Lorenzo Neal FB; 30 Andrew Pinnock FB; 21 LaDainian Tomlinson; Wide receivers (WR): 89 David Boston; 82 Reche Caldwell; 10 Dondre Gilliam; 86 Grant Mattos; 81 Kassim Osgood; 11 Micah Ross; Tight ends (TE): 85 Antonio Gates; 83 Josh Norman; 84 Justin Peelle	Offensive linemen (OL): 60 Jason Ball C; 64 Phil Bogle G/T; 65 David Brandt C/G; 68 Kris Dielman G; 69 Ed Ellis T; 63 Kelvin Garmon G; 61 Michael Keathley G; 77 Damion McIntosh T; 79 Solomon Page G/T; 66 Cory Raymer C; Defensive linemen (DL): 74 Jacques Cesaire DE/DT; 90 Adrian Dingle DE; 92 Jason Fisk DT; 91 Omari Hand DE; 93 Otis Leverette DE; 95 Joe Salave'a DT; 78 DeQuincy Scott DT; 75 Marcellus Wiley DE; 76 Jamal Williams DT	Linebackers (LB): 54 Stephen Cooper MLB; 59 Donnie Edwards OLB; 51 Ben Leber OLB; 57 Zeke Moreno MLB; 52 Carlos Polk OLB; 56 Matt Wilhelm OLB; Defensive backs (DB): 22 Sammy Davis CB; 29 Drayton Florence CB; 36 Vernon Fox SS; 32 Kevin House CB; 23 Quentin Jammer CB; 48 Terrence Kiel SS; 34 Tony Okanlawon FS; 20 Jerry Wilson FS; Special teams (ST): 2 Darren Bennett P; 50 David Binn LS; 8 Steve Christie K; 5 Mike Scifres P	Practice squad: 96 Clenton Ballard DT; -- Reggie Coleman T; 4 Mackenzie Hoambrecker K; 17 Cleo Lemon QB; Reserve: 80 Stephen Alexander TE (IR); -- Tim Baker WR (IR); 87 Tim Dwight WR/KR (IR); 71 Toniu Fonoti G (IR); 62 Bob Hallen G (IR); 25 Antoineo Harris RB (IR); 99 Raylee Johnson DE (IR); 42 Kwamie Lassiter S (IR); 31 Hanik Milligan S (IR); 88 Eric Parker WR (IR); 70 Vaughn Parker T (IR); 73 Courtney Van Buren T (IR); Rookies in italics 53 active, 12 reserve, 4 practice squad

== Preseason ==
Week	Date	Opponent	Result	Record	Venue	Attendance
1	August 10	at Seattle Seahawks	L 7–20	0–1	Seahawks Stadium	
2	August 16	Arizona Cardinals	L 10–16	0–2	Qualcomm Stadium	
3	August 22	at Houston Texans	W 19–17	1–2	Reliant Stadium	
4	August 28	San Francisco 49ers	W 24–3	2–2	Qualcomm Stadium	

== Regular season ==
=== Schedule ===
In addition to their regular games with AFC West rivals, the Chargers played teams from the AFC North and NFC North as per the schedule rotation, and also played intraconference games against the Jaguars and the Dolphins based on divisional positions from 2002.

Oddly, this season marked the first time that the Chargers played the Jaguars, despite that team existing since 1995. This occurred due to old NFL scheduling formulas in place prior to 2002, whereby teams had no rotating schedule opposing members of other divisions within their own conference, but played interdivisional conference games according to position within a season’s table. The Chargers played the Tennessee Titans only once during this period (in 1998) but played the Bengals five times during these years.

In preceding years, even longer gaps between two teams playing each other had occurred. For instance the Jets never opposed the Cardinals between 1979 and 1995 inclusive.

The Week 8 home game against the Miami Dolphins was relocated to Sun Devil Stadium in Tempe, Arizona due to a massive wildfire that turned Qualcomm Stadium into an evacuation site.

Week	Date	Opponent	Result	Record	Venue	Attendance	Recap
1	September 7	at **Kansas City Chiefs**	**L** 14–27	0–1	Arrowhead Stadium	78,048	Recap
2	September 14	**Denver Broncos**	**L** 13–37	0–2	Qualcomm Stadium	65,445	Recap
3	September 21	Baltimore Ravens	**L** 10–24	0–3	Qualcomm Stadium	52,028	Recap
4	September 28	at **Oakland Raiders**	**L** 31–34 (OT)	0–4	Network Associates Coliseum	54,078	Recap
5	October 5	at Jacksonville Jaguars	**L** 21–27	0–5	Alltel Stadium	48,954	Recap
6	Bye						
7	October 19	at Cleveland Browns	**W** 26–20	1–5	Cleveland Browns Stadium	73,238	Recap
8	October 27	Miami Dolphins	**L** 10–26	1–6	Sun Devil Stadium	73,014	Recap
9	November 2	at Chicago Bears	**L** 7–20	1–7	Soldier Field	61,500	Recap
10	November 9	Minnesota Vikings	**W** 42–28	2–7	Qualcomm Stadium	64,738	Recap
11	November 16	at **Denver Broncos**	**L** 8–37	2–8	Invesco Field	75,217	Recap
12	November 23	Cincinnati Bengals	**L** 27–34	2–9	Qualcomm Stadium	52,069	Recap
13	November 30	**Kansas City Chiefs**	**L** 24–28	2–10	Qualcomm Stadium	57,671	Recap
14	December 7	at Detroit Lions	**W** 14–7	3–10	Ford Field	61,544	Recap
15	December 14	Green Bay Packers	**L** 21–38	3–11	Qualcomm Stadium	64,978	Recap
16	December 21	at Pittsburgh Steelers	**L** 24–40	3–12	Heinz Field	52,527	Recap
17	December 28	**Oakland Raiders**	**W** 21–14	4–12	Qualcomm Stadium	62,222	Recap

Note: Intra-division opponents are in bold text.

==== Week 1: at Kansas City Chiefs ====
Week 1: San Diego Chargers at Kansas City Chiefs

Quarter	1	2	3	4	Total
Chargers	0	0	7	7	**14**
**Chiefs**	14	10	3	0	**27**

at Arrowhead Stadium, Kansas City, Missouri

- Date: September 7
- Game time: 12:00 p.m. CDT
- Game weather: 77 °F (25 °C), relative humidity 36%, wind 6 mph
- Game attendance: 78,048
- Referee: Ed Hochuli
- TV announcers (CBS): Greg Gumbel, Phil Simms and Armen Keteyian
- Box score

Game information

**First quarter**

- KAN – Priest Holmes 24-yard run (Morten Andersen kick), 11:37. Chiefs 7–0. **Drive: 6 plays, 68 yards, 3:23.**
- KAN – Priest Holmes 5-yard run (Morten Andersen kick), 1:21. Chiefs 14–0. **Drive: 9 plays, 59 yards, 4:04.**

**Second quarter**

- KAN – Johnnie Morton 20-yard pass from Trent Green (Morten Andersen kick), 10:08. Chiefs 21–0. **Drive: 6 plays, 72 yards, 2:47.**
- KAN – Morten Andersen 42-yard field goal, 4:25. Chiefs 24–0. **Drive: 6 plays, 29 yards, 3:17.**

**Third quarter**

- SDG – Josh Norman 21-yard pass from Drew Brees (Steve Christie kick), 8:16. Chiefs 24–7. **Drive: 5 plays, 51 yards, 2:16.**

**Fourth quarter**

- KAN – Morten Andersen 46-yard field goal, 2:22. Chiefs 27–7. **Drive: 10 plays, 37 yards, 5:54.**
- SDG – Eric Parker 20-yard pass from Drew Brees (Steve Christie kick), 4:32. Chiefs 27–14. **Drive: 6 plays, 67 yards, 2:31.**

**Top passers**

- SDG – Drew Brees – 18/33, 202 yards, 2 TD, 2 INT
- KAN – Trent Green – 21/32, 282 yards, TD, INT

**Top rushers**

- SDG – LaDainian Tomlinson – 13 rushes, 34 yards
- KAN – Priest Holmes – 18 rushes, 85 yards, 2 TD

**Top receivers**

- SDG – Josh Norman – 4 receptions, 64 yards, TD
- KAN – Priest Holmes – 7 receptions, 98 yards

==== Week 2: vs. Denver Broncos ====
Week 2: Denver Broncos at San Diego Chargers

Quarter	1	2	3	4	Total
**Broncos**	14	10	10	3	**37**
Chargers	3	7	3	0	**13**

at Qualcomm Stadium, San Diego, California

- Date: September 14
- Game time: 1:15 p.m. PDT
- Game weather: 73 °F (23 °C), relative humidity 69%, wind 8 mph
- Game attendance: 65,445
- Referee: Tony Corrente
- TV announcers (CBS): Gus Johnson, Brent Jones, Scott Kaplan
- Box score

Game information

**First quarter**

- DEN – Reuben Droughns 12-yard pass from Jake Plummer (Jason Elam kick), 12:18. Broncos 7–0. **Drive: 7 plays, 69 yards, 2:42.**
- SDG – Steve Christie 19-yard field goal, 6:21. Broncos 7–3. **Drive: 9 plays, 58 yards, 5:57.**
- DEN – Shannon Sharpe 1-yard pass from Jake Plummer (Jason Elam kick), 1:36. Broncos 14–3. **Drive: 7 plays, 88 yards, 4:45.**

**Second quarter**

- DEN – Cooper Carlisle 6-yard pass from Jake Plummer (Jason Elam kick), 6:58. Broncos 21–3. **Drive: 10 plays, 54 yards, 6:01.**
- SDG – Eric Parker 23-yard pass from Drew Brees (Steve Christie kick), 1:05. Broncos 21–10. **Drive: 12 plays, 80 yards, 5:53.**
- DEN – Jason Elam 30-yard field goal, 0:05. Broncos 24–10. **Drive: 8 plays, 56 yards, 1:00.**

**Third quarter**

- SDG – Steve Christie 25-yard field goal, 9:31. Broncos 24–13. **Drive: 11 plays, 67 yards, 5:29.**
- DEN – Mike Anderson 1-yard run (Jason Elam kick), 4:48. Broncos 31–13. **Drive: 7 plays, 51 yards, 4:43.**
- DEN – Jason Elam 45-yard field goal, 1:05. Broncos 34–13. **Drive: 6 plays, 18 yards, 2:16.**

**Fourth quarter**

- DEN – Jason Elam 34-yard field goal, 14:21. Broncos 37–13. **Drive: 4 plays, 8 yards, 1:26.**

**Top passers**

- DEN – Steve Beuerlein – 7/16, 98 yards
- SDG – Drew Brees – 20/41, 182 yards, TD, INT

**Top rushers**

- DEN – Clinton Portis – 12 rushes, 129 yards
- SDG – LaDainian Tomlinson – 16 rushes, 93 yards

**Top receivers**

- DEN – Rod Smith – 5 receptions, 71 yards
- SDG – Eric Parker – 5 receptions, 59 yards, TD

==== Week 3: vs. Baltimore Ravens ====
Week 3: Baltimore Ravens at San Diego Chargers

Quarter	1	2	3	4	Total
**Ravens**	7	3	14	0	**24**
Chargers	3	0	0	7	**10**

at Qualcomm Stadium, San Diego, California

- Date: September 21
- Game time: 1:15 p.m. PDT
- Game weather: 74 °F (23 °C), relative humidity 77%, wind 8 mph
- Game attendance: 52,028
- Referee: Bill Leavy
- TV announcers (CBS): Ian Eagle, Solomon Wilcots and Scott Kaplan
- Box score

Game information

**First quarter**

- SDG – Steve Christie 24-yard field goal, 2:44. Chargers 3–0. **Drive: 15 plays, 72 yards, 8:36.**
- BAL – Alan Ricard 50-yard offensive fumble return (Matt Stover kick), 1:31. Ravens 7–3. **Drive: 4 plays, 71 yards, 1:13.**

**Second quarter**

- BAL – Matt Stover 49-yard field goal, 0:00. Ravens 10–3. **Drive: 7 plays, 29 yards, 0:46.**

**Third quarter**

- BAL – Todd Heap 25-yard pass from Kyle Boller (Matt Stover kick), 3:00. Ravens 17–3. **Drive: 6 plays, 72 yards, 3:02.**
- BAL – Jamal Lewis 7-yard run (Matt Stover kick), 1:18. Ravens 24–3. **Drive: 2 plays, 14 yards, 0:25.**

**Fourth quarter**

- SDG – LaDainian Tomlinson 2-yard run (Steve Christie kick), 9:06. Ravens 24–10. **Drive: 15 plays, 77 yards, 7:12.**

**Top passers**

- BAL – Kyle Boller – 12/21, 98 yards, TD, INT
- SDG – Drew Brees – 28/45, 270 yards, 3 INT

**Top rushers**

- BAL – Jamal Lewis – 23 rushes, 132 yards, TD
- SDG – LaDainian Tomlinson – 23 rushes, 105 yards, TD

**Top receivers**

- BAL – Todd Heap – 5 receptions, 50 yards, TD
- SDG – David Boston – 6 receptions, 91 yards

==== Week 4: at Oakland Raiders ====
Week 4: San Diego Chargers at Oakland Raiders – Game summary

Quarter	1	2	3	4	OT	Total
Chargers	7	14	3	7	0	**31**
**Raiders**	7	7	0	17	3	**34**

at Network Associates Coliseum, Oakland, California

- Date: September 28
- Game time: 1:05 p.m. PDT
- Game weather: 63 °F (17 °C), relative humidity 75%, wind 14 mph
- Game attendance: 54,078
- Referee: Peter Morelli
- TV announcers (CBS): Dick Enberg, Dan Dierdorf and Bonnie Bernstein
- Box score

Game information

**First quarter**

- OAK – Tim Brown 36-yard pass from Rich Gannon (Sebastian Janikowski kick), 11:26. Raiders 7–0. **Drive: 7 plays, 78 yards, 3:34.**
- SDG – Drew Brees 21-yard pass from LaDainian Tomlinson (Steve Christie kick), 6:46. Tied 7–7. **Drive: 8 plays, 71 yards, 4:40.**

**Second quarter**

- SDG – Justin Peelle 7-yard pass from Drew Brees (Steve Christie kick), 13:19. Chargers 14–7. **Drive: 3 plays, 18 yards, 1:29.**
- OAK – Doug Jolley 2-yard pass from Rich Gannon (Sebastian Janikowski kick), 8:14. Tied 14–14. **Drive: 11 plays, 92 yards, 5:05.**
- SDG – LaDainian Tomlinson 55-yard run (Steve Christie kick), 6:44. Chargers 21–14. **Drive: 3 plays, 74 yards, 1:30.**

**Third quarter**

- SDG – Steve Christie 32-yard field goal, 10:41. Chargers 24–14. **Drive: 8 plays, 20 yards, 4:19.**

**Fourth quarter**

- OAK – Sebastian Janikowski 23-yard field goal, 9:29. Chargers 24–17. **Drive: 16 plays, 75 yards, 7:05.**
- SDG – Lorenzo Neal 3-yard run (Steve Christie kick), 5:59. Chargers 31–17. **Drive: 7 plays, 66 yards, 3:30.**
- OAK – Alvis Whitted 36-yard pass from Rich Gannon (Sebastian Janikowski kick), 4:38. Chargers 31–24. **Drive: 4 plays, 60 yards, 1:21.**
- OAK – Charlie Garner 24-yard run (Sebastian Janikowski kick), 1:24. Tied 31–31. **Drive: 5 plays, 64 yards, 1:27.**

**Overtime**

- OAK – Sebastian Janikowski 46-yard field goal, 5:01. Raiders 34–31. **Drive: 9 plays, 64 yards, 4:44.**

**Top passers**

- SDG – Drew Brees – 21/31, 187 yards, TD, INT
- OAK – Rich Gannon – 26/43, 348 yards, 3 TD, INT

**Top rushers**

- SDG – LaDainian Tomlinson – 28 rushes, 187 yards, TD
- OAK – Charlie Garner – 12 rushes, 70 yards, TD

**Top receivers**

- SDG – Dondre Gilliam – 4 receptions, 67 yards
- OAK – Jerry Rice – 7 receptions, 126 yards

==== Week 5: at Jacksonville Jaguars ====
Week 5: San Diego Chargers at Jacksonville Jaguars – Game summary

Quarter	1	2	3	4	Total
Chargers	0	7	0	14	**21**
**Jaguars**	7	3	10	7	**27**

at Alltel Stadium, Jacksonville, Florida

- Date: October 5
- Game time: 1:05 p.m. EDT
- Game weather: 84 °F (29 °C), relative humidity 47%, wind 5 mph
- Game attendance: 48,954
- Referee: Tom White
- TV announcers (CBS): Ian Eagle and Solomon Wilcots
- Box score

Game information

**First quarter**

- JAC – Fred Taylor 1-yard run (Seth Marler kick), 5:43. Jaguars 7–0. **Drive: 14 plays, 62 yards, 5:46.**

**Second quarter**

- SDG – David Boston 46-yard pass from Drew Brees (Steve Christie kick), 9:56. Tied 7–7. **Drive: 4 plays, 66 yards, 2:00.**
- JAC – Seth Marler 53-yard field goal, 0:00. Jaguars 10–7. **Drive: 7 plays, 54 yards, 3:12.**

**Third quarter**

- JAC – Troy Edwards 18-yard pass from Byron Leftwich (Seth Marler kick), 6:39. Jaguars 17–7. **Drive: 11 plays, 90 yards, 5:44.**
- JAC – Seth Marler 27-yard field goal, 2:38. Jaguars 20–7. **Drive: 4 plays, 8 yards, 1:49.**

**Fourth quarter**

- SDG – Eric Parker 33-yard pass from Drew Brees (Steve Christie kick), 4:19. Jaguars 20–14. **Drive: 5 plays, 71 yards, 1:51.**
- JAC – Fred Taylor 60-yard pass from Byron Leftwich (Seth Marler kick), 1:47. Jaguars 27–14. **Drive: 6 plays, 73 yards, 2:32.**
- SDG – David Boston 13-yard pass from Drew Brees (Steve Christie kick), 0:20. Jaguars 27–21. **Drive: 10 plays, 69 yards, 1:27.**

**Top passers**

- SDG – Drew Brees – 24/41, 296 yards, 3 TD
- JAC – Byron Leftwich – 19/28, 336 yards, 2 TD

**Top rushers**

- SDG – LaDainian Tomlinson – 10 rushes, 38 yards
- JAC – Fred Taylor – 27 rushes, 87 yards, TD

**Top receivers**

- SDG – David Boston – 14 receptions, 181 yards, 2 TD
- JAC – Jimmy Smith – 8 receptions, 137 yards

==== Week 7: at Cleveland Browns ====
Week 7: San Diego Chargers at Cleveland Browns – Game summary

Quarter	1	2	3	4	Total
**Chargers**	6	7	10	3	**26**
Browns	0	3	3	14	**20**

at Cleveland Browns Stadium, Cleveland, Ohio

- Date: October 19
- Game time: 1:02 p.m. EDT
- Game weather: 58 °F (14 °C), relative humidity 50%, wind 8 mph
- Game attendance: 73,238
- Referee: Jeff Triplette
- TV announcers (CBS): Ian Eagle and Solomon Wilcots
- Box score

Game information

**First quarter**

- SDG – Steve Christie 44-yard field goal, 7:18. Chargers 3–0. **Drive: 7 plays, 37 yards, 3:39.**
- SDG – Steve Christie 50-yard field goal, 2:57. Chargers 6–0. **Drive: 7 plays, 43 yards, 2:31.**

**Second quarter**

- SDG – Kwamie Lassiter 38-yard interception return (Steve Christie kick), 5:27. Chargers 13–0.
- CLE – Phil Dawson 46-yard field goal, 0:35. Chargers 13–3. **Drive: 12 plays, 39 yards, 4:52.**

**Third quarter**

- CLE – Phil Dawson 42-yard field goal, 12:44. Chargers 13–6. **Drive: 4 plays, 8 yards, 2:02.**
- SDG – LaDainian Tomlinson 70-yard run (Steve Christie kick), 12:27. Chargers 20–6. **Drive: 1 play, 70 yards, 0:17.**
- SDG – Steve Christie 42-yard field goal, 2:57. Chargers 23–6. **Drive: 4 plays, 8 yards, 1:37.**

**Fourth quarter**

- CLE – Dennis Northcutt 6-yard pass from Kelly Holcomb (Phil Dawson kick), 14:52. Chargers 23–13. **Drive: 7 plays, 74 yards, 3:05.**
- CLE – Darnell Sanders 1-yard pass from Kelly Holcomb (Phil Dawson kick), 11:40. Chargers 23–20. **Drive: 8 plays, 35 yards, 3:04.**
- SDG – Steve Christie 32-yard field goal, 3:44. Chargers 26–20. **Drive: 13 plays, 58 yards, 7:56.**

**Top passers**

- SDG – Drew Brees – 9/18, 74 yards, INT
- CLE – Tim Couch – 13/24, 102 yards, 2 INT

**Top rushers**

- SDG – LaDainian Tomlinson – 26 rushes, 200 yards, TD
- CLE – William Green – 14 rushes, 65 yards

**Top receivers**

- SDG – Eric Parker – 2 receptions, 22 yards
- CLE – Dennis Northcutt – 5 receptions, 54 yards, TD

==== Week 8: vs. Miami Dolphins ====
Week 8: Miami Dolphins at San Diego Chargers

Quarter	1	2	3	4	Total
**Dolphins**	10	14	0	2	**26**
Chargers	3	0	0	7	**10**

at Sun Devil Stadium, Tempe, Arizona

- Date: October 27
- Game time: 7:09 p.m. MST
- Game weather: 79 °F (26 °C), relative humidity 12%, wind 3 mph
- Game attendance: 73,014
- Referee: Ron Blum
- TV announcers (ABC): Al Michaels, John Madden and Lisa Guerrero
- Box score

Game information

**First quarter**

- MIA – Chris Chambers 5-yard pass from Brian Griese (Olindo Mare kick), 12:58. Dolphins 7–0. **Drive: 2 plays, 6 yards, 0:45.**
- MIA – Olindo Mare 44-yard field goal, 8:34. Dolphins 10–0. **Drive: 4 plays, -2 yards, 1:51.**
- SDG – Steve Christie 51-yard field goal, 3:17. Dolphins 10–3. **Drive: 9 plays, 44 yards, 5:17.**

**Second quarter**

- MIA – James McKnight 2-yard pass from Brian Griese (Olindo Mare kick), 13:28. Dolphins 17–3. **Drive: 10 plays, 65 yards, 4:49.**
- MIA – Randy McMichael 7-yard pass from Brian Griese (Olindo Mare kick), 1:55. Dolphins 24–3. **Drive: 6 plays, 80 yards, 3:04.**

**Third quarter**

- No scoring plays.

**Fourth quarter**

- SDG – LaDainian Tomlinson 1-yard run (Steve Christie kick), 12:27. Dolphins 24–10. **Drive: 3 plays, 1 yard, 0:48.**
- MIA – Safety, Jason Taylor tackled Damion McIntosh in end zone, 8:06. Dolphins 26–10.

**Top passers**

- MIA – Brian Griese – 20/29, 192 yards, 3 TD
- SDG – Drew Brees – 19/30, 190 yards, 3 INT

**Top rushers**

- MIA – Ricky Williams – 23 rushes, 69 yards
- SDG – LaDainian Tomlinson – 24 rushes, 62 yards, TD

**Top receivers**

- MIA – Chris Chambers – 4 receptions, 79 yards, TD
- SDG – David Boston – 5 receptions, 82 yards

==== Week 9: at Chicago Bears ====
Week 9: San Diego Chargers at Chicago Bears – Game summary

Quarter	1	2	3	4	Total
Chargers	0	0	0	7	**7**
**Bears**	3	7	3	7	**20**

at Soldier Field, Chicago, Illinois

- Date: November 2
- Game time: 12:05 p.m. CST
- Game weather: 57 °F (14 °C), relative humidity 96%, no wind
- Game attendance: 61,500
- Referee: Ron Winter
- TV announcers (CBS): Gus Johnson and Brent Jones
- Box score

Game information

**First quarter**

- CHI – Paul Edinger 38-yard field goal, 8:33. Bears 3–0. **Drive: 9 plays, 56 yards, 3:37.**

**Second quarter**

- CHI – Anthony Thomas 1-yard run (Paul Edinger kick), 9:27. Bears 10–0. **Drive: 12 plays, 64 yards, 7:48.**

**Third quarter**

- CHI – Paul Edinger 22-yard field goal, 4:27. Bears 13–0. **Drive: 9 plays, 40 yards, 4:21.**

**Fourth quarter**

- SDG – LaDainian Tomlinson 3-yard run (Steve Christie kick), 9:13. Bears 13–7. **Drive: 8 plays, 74 yards, 4:04.**
- CHI – Anthony Thomas 1-yard run (Paul Edinger kick), 0:21. Bears 20–7. **Drive: 6 plays, 21 yards, 2:47.**

**Top passers**

- SDG – Doug Flutie – 8/11, 70 yards
- CHI – Chris Chandler – 21/30, 224 yards, INT

**Top rushers**

- SDG – LaDainian Tomlinson – 16 rushes, 61 yards, TD
- CHI – Anthony Thomas – 31 rushes, 111 yards, 2 TD

**Top receivers**

- SDG – David Boston – 4 receptions, 29 yards
- CHI – Dez White – 7 receptions, 58 yards

==== Week 10: vs. Minnesota Vikings ====
Week 10: Minnesota Vikings at San Diego Chargers

Quarter	1	2	3	4	Total
Vikings	7	7	0	14	**28**
Chargers	14	14	7	7	**42**

at Qualcomm Stadium, San Diego, California

- Date: November 9
- Game time: 1:05 p.m. PST
- Game weather: 66 °F (19 °C), relative humidity 57%, wind 9 mph
- Game attendance: 64,738
- Referee: Ed Hochuli
- TV announcers (FOX): Kenny Albert and Brian Baldinger
- Box score

Game information

**First quarter**

- SDG – David Boston 3-yard pass from Doug Flutie (Steve Christie kick), 11:47. Chargers 7–0. **Drive: 7 plays, 63 yards, 3:13.**
- SDG – LaDainian Tomlinson 73-yard run (Steve Christie kick), 7:51. Chargers 14–0. **Drive: 5 plays, 85 yards, 1:59.**
- MIN – Randy Moss 4-yard pass from Daunte Culpepper (Aaron Elling kick), 2:09. Chargers 14–7. **Drive: 10 plays, 80 yards, 5:42.**

**Second quarter**

- SDG – Doug Flutie 3-yard run (Steve Christie kick), 11:36. Chargers 21–7. **Drive: 12 plays, 68 yards, 5:33.**
- MIN – Nate Burleson 19-yard pass from Daunte Culpepper (Aaron Elling kick), 4:42. Chargers 21–14. **Drive: 11 plays, 83 yards, 6:54.**
- SDG – Antonio Gates 4-yard pass from Doug Flutie (Steve Christie kick), 0:25. Chargers 28–14. **Drive: 10 plays, 66 yards, 4:17.**

**Third quarter**

- SDG – LaDainian Tomlinson 1-yard run (Steve Christie kick), 1:36. Chargers 35–14. **Drive: 6 plays, 57 yards, 3:09.**

**Fourth quarter**

- MIN – Moe Williams 31-yard pass from Daunte Culpepper (Aaron Elling kick), 14:48. Chargers 35–21. **Drive: 4 plays, 52 yards, 1:48.**
- SDG – Doug Flutie 13-yard run (Steve Christie kick), 8:11. Chargers 42–21. **Drive: 5 plays, 73 yards, 2:56.**
- MIN – Moe Williams 2-yard pass from Daunte Culpepper (Aaron Elling kick), 4:20. Chargers 42–28. **Drive: 10 plays, 57 yards, 3:51.**

**Top passers**

- MIN – Daunte Culpepper – 32/44, 370 yards, 4 TD, INT
- SDG – Doug Flutie – 21/29, 248 yards, 2 TD

**Top rushers**

- MIN – Moe Williams – 12 rushes, 45 yards
- SDG – LaDainian Tomlinson – 16 rushes, 162 yards, 2 TD

**Top receivers**

- MIN – Moe Williams – 11 receptions, 126 yards, 2 TD
- SDG – David Boston – 7 receptions, 82 yards, TD

==== Week 11: at Denver Broncos ====
Week 11: San Diego Chargers at Denver Broncos

Quarter	1	2	3	4	Total
Chargers	0	0	0	8	**8**
**Broncos**	10	17	7	3	**37**

at Invesco Field at Mile High, Denver, Colorado

- Date: November 16
- Game time: 2:05 p.m. MST
- Game weather: 52 °F (11 °C), relative humidity 25%, wind 6 mph
- Game attendance: 75,217
- Referee: Larry Nemmers
- TV announcers (CBS): Ian Eagle and Solomon Wilcots
- Box score

Game information

**First quarter**

- DEN – Shannon Sharpe 11-yard pass from Jake Plummer (Jason Elam kick), 13:06. Broncos 7–0. **Drive: 2 plays, 11 yards, 0:11.**
- DEN – Jason Elam 42-yard field goal, 6:14. Broncos 10–0. **Drive: 11 plays, 31 yards, 5:07.**

**Second quarter**

- DEN – Jason Elam 22-yard field goal, 9:46. Broncos 13–0. **Drive: 15 plays, 86 yards, 8:13.**
- DEN – Rod Smith 65-yard punt return (Jason Elam kick), 8:25. Broncos 20–0.
- DEN – Shannon Sharpe 26-yard pass from Jake Plummer (Jason Elam kick), 0:32. Broncos 27–0. **Drive: 5 plays, 55 yards, 0:50.**

**Third quarter**

- DEN – Shannon Sharpe 26-yard pass from Jake Plummer (Jason Elam kick), 1:28. Broncos 34–0. **Drive: 8 plays, 85 yards, 4:44.**

**Fourth quarter**

- DEN – Micah Knorr 27-yard field goal, 13:11. Broncos 37–0. **Drive: 7 plays, 19 yards, 2:49.**
- SDG – Kassim Osgood 19-yard pass from Doug Flutie (Stephen Alexander pass from Doug Flutie), 10:12. Broncos 37–8. **Drive: 8 plays, 67 yards, 2:59.**

**Top passers**

- SDG – Doug Flutie – 9/25, 70 yards, TD, INT
- DEN – Jake Plummer – 23/34, 253 yards, 3 TD, INT

**Top rushers**

- SDG – LaDainian Tomlinson – 8 rushes, 29 yards
- DEN – Clinton Portis – 25 rushes, 106 yards

**Top receivers**

- SDG – Kassim Osgood – 1 reception, 19 yards, TD
- DEN – Shannon Sharpe – 7 receptions, 101 yards, 3 TD

==== Week 12: vs. Cincinnati Bengals ====
Week 12: Cincinnati Bengals at San Diego Chargers

Quarter	1	2	3	4	Total
**Bengals**	14	14	3	3	**34**
Chargers	7	6	0	14	**27**

at Qualcomm Stadium, San Diego, California

- Date: November 23
- Game time: 1:15 p.m. PST
- Game weather: 67 °F (19 °C), relative humidity 49%, wind 9 mph
- Game attendance: 52,069
- Referee: Tony Corrente
- TV announcers (CBS): Bill Macatee, Beasley Reece and Scott Kaplan
- Box score

Game information

**First quarter**

- CIN – Chad Johnson 5-yard pass from Jon Kitna (Shayne Graham kick), 10:15. Bengals 7–0. **Drive: 10 plays, 70 yards, 4:45.**
- CIN – Chad Johnson 4-yard pass from Jon Kitna (Shayne Graham kick), 3:35. Bengals 14–0. **Drive: 13 plays, 88 yards, 4:59.**
- SDG – David Boston 37-yard pass from Doug Flutie (Steve Christie kick), 0:11. Bengals 14–7. **Drive: 8 plays, 70 yards, 3:24.**

**Second quarter**

- SDG – Steve Christie 48-yard field goal, 9:36. Bengals 14–10. **Drive: 9 plays, 42 yards, 4:08.**
- SDG – Steve Christie 26-yard field goal, 4:05. Bengals 14–13. **Drive: 8 plays, 32 yards, 2:34.**
- CIN – Chad Johnson 12-yard pass from Jon Kitna (Shayne Graham kick), 1:25. Bengals 21–13. **Drive: 6 plays, 60 yards, 2:40.**
- CIN – Kelley Washington 4-yard pass from Jon Kitna (Shayne Graham kick), 0:11. Bengals 28–13. **Drive: 6 plays, 59 yards, 0:43.**

**Third quarter**

- CIN – Shayne Graham 37-yard field goal, 2:23. Bengals 31–13. **Drive: 12 plays, 62 yards, 7:31.**

**Fourth quarter**

- SDG – David Boston 26-yard pass from Doug Flutie (Steve Christie kick), 14:54. Bengals 31–20. **Drive: 8 plays, 57 yards, 2:29.**
- CIN – Shayne Graham 47-yard field goal, 5:26. Bengals 34–20. **Drive: 8 plays, 26 yards, 3:07.**
- SDG – LaDainian Tomlinson 6-yard run (Steve Christie kick), 3:04. Bengals 34–27. **Drive: 6 plays, 80 yards, 2:22.**

**Top passers**

- CIN – Jon Kitna – 24/38, 243 yards, 4 TD
- SDG – Doug Flutie – 15/33, 210 yards, 2 TD

**Top rushers**

- CIN – Corey Dillon – 18 rushes, 108 yards
- SDG – LaDainian Tomlinson – 16 rushes, 95 yards, TD

**Top receivers**

- CIN – Chad Johnson – 10 receptions, 107 yards, 3 TD
- SDG – David Boston – 9 receptions, 139 yards, 2 TD

==== Week 13: vs. Kansas City Chiefs ====
Week 13: Kansas City Chiefs at San Diego Chargers

Quarter	1	2	3	4	Total
**Chiefs**	7	14	0	7	**28**
Chargers	0	7	10	7	**24**

at Qualcomm Stadium, San Diego, California

- Date: November 30
- Game time: 1:15 p.m. PST
- Game weather: 71 °F (22 °C), relative humidity 48%, wind 8 mph
- Game attendance: 57,671
- Referee: Mike Carey
- TV announcers (CBS): Dick Enberg, Dan Dierdorf and Bonnie Bernstein
- Box score

Game information

**First quarter**

- KAN – Priest Holmes 7-yard run (Morten Andersen kick), 5:09. Chiefs 7–0. **Drive: 10 plays, 56 yards, 5:20.**

**Second quarter**

- KAN – Priest Holmes 2-yard run (Morten Andersen kick), 12:41. Chiefs 14–0. **Drive: 12 plays, 70 yards, 5:49.**
- SDG – LaDainian Tomlinson 6-yard run (Steve Christie kick), 6:23. Chiefs 14–7. **Drive: 8 plays, 52 yards, 4:54.**
- KAN – Tony Gonzalez 7-yard pass from Trent Green (Morten Andersen kick), 1:54. Chiefs 21–7. **Drive: 7 plays, 60 yards, 2:59.**

**Third quarter**

- SDG – Steve Christie 21-yard field goal, 8:59. Chiefs 21–10. **Drive: 11 plays, 53 yards, 6:01.**
- SDG – David Boston 20-yard pass from Doug Flutie (Steve Christie kick), 2:56. Chiefs 21–17. **Drive: 5 plays, 77 yards, 2:07.**

**Fourth quarter**

- KAN – Tony Gonzalez 3-yard pass from Trent Green (Morten Andersen kick), 6:28. Chiefs 28–17. **Drive: 8 plays, 27 yards, 4:05.**
- SDG – Antonio Gates 18-yard pass from Doug Flutie (Steve Christie kick), 0:00. Chiefs 28–24. **Drive: 8 plays, 84 yards, 1:08.**

**Top passers**

- KAN – Trent Green – 17/30, 155 yards, 2 TD, 2 INT
- SDG – Doug Flutie – 16/34, 213 yards, 2 TD, 2 INT

**Top rushers**

- KAN – Priest Holmes – 31 rushes, 162 yards, 2 TD
- SDG – LaDainian Tomlinson – 19 rushes, 106 yards, TD

**Top receivers**

- KAN – Johnnie Morton – 3 receptions, 60 yards
- SDG – David Boston – 5 receptions, 85 yards, TD

==== Week 14: at Detroit Lions ====
Week 14: San Diego Chargers at Detroit Lions

Quarter	1	2	3	4	Total
**Chargers**	7	7	0	0	**14**
Lions	0	0	0	7	**7**

at Ford Field, Detroit, Michigan

- Date: December 7
- Game time: 1:03 p.m. EST
- Game weather: N/A (game played indoors)
- Game attendance: 61,544
- Referee: Walt Anderson
- TV announcers (CBS): Bill Macatee and Jerry Glanville
- Box score

Game information

**First quarter**

- SDG – LaDainian Tomlinson 16-yard pass from Doug Flutie (Steve Christie kick), 4:14. Chargers 7–0. **Drive: 9 plays, 70 yards, 4:48.**

**Second quarter**

- SDG – LaDainian Tomlinson 73-yard pass from Doug Flutie (Steve Christie kick), 1:54. Chargers 14–0. **Drive: 3 plays, 77 yards, 1:02.**

**Third quarter**

- No scoring plays.

**Fourth quarter**

- DET – Casey Fitzsimmons 4-yard pass from Joey Harrington (Jason Hanson kick), 7:22. Chargers 14–7. **Drive: 11 plays, 83 yards, 6:33.**

**Top passers**

- SDG – Doug Flutie – 17/25, 244 yards, 2 TD, INT
- DET – Joey Harrington – 26/46, 208 yards, TD

**Top rushers**

- SDG – LaDainian Tomlinson – 25 rushes, 88 yards
- DET – Shawn Bryson – 10 rushes, 28 yards

**Top receivers**

- SDG – LaDainian Tomlinson – 9 receptions, 148 yards, 2 TD
- DET – Reggie Swinton – 5 receptions, 54 yards

==== Week 15: vs. Green Bay Packers ====
Week 15: Green Bay Packers at San Diego Chargers

Quarter	1	2	3	4	Total
**Packers**	7	10	0	21	**38**
Chargers	3	0	3	15	**21**

at Qualcomm Stadium, San Diego, California

- Date: December 14
- Game time: 1:15 p.m. PST
- Game weather: 61 °F (16 °C), relative humidity 52%, wind 8 mph
- Game attendance: 64,978
- Referee: Ron Blum
- TV announcers (FOX): Sam Rosen, Bill Maas and Drew Smith
- Box score

Game information

**First quarter**

- GB – Ahman Green 4-yard run (Ryan Longwell kick), 10:59. Packers 7–0. **Drive: 10 plays, 56 yards, 5:20.**
- SDG – Steve Christie 20-yard field goal, 6:02. Packers 7–3. **Drive: 11 plays, 53 yards, 6:01.**

**Second quarter**

- GB – Ryan Longwell 32-yard field goal, 8:59. Packers 10–3. **Drive: 12 plays, 70 yards, 5:49.**
- GB – Donald Driver 7-yard pass from Brett Favre (Ryan Longwell kick), 0:33. Packers 17–3. **Drive: 7 plays, 60 yards, 2:59.**

**Third quarter**

- SDG – Steve Christie 26-yard field goal, 8:52. Packers 17–6. **Drive: 11 plays, 53 yards, 6:01.**

**Fourth quarter**

- SDG – LaDainian Tomlinson 7-yard pass from Drew Brees (David Boston pass from Drew Brees), 14:56. Packers 17–14. **Drive: 8 plays, 52 yards, 4:54.**
- SDG – LaDainian Tomlinson 68-yard pass from Drew Brees (Steve Christie kick), 12:10. Chargers 21–17. **Drive: 8 plays, 52 yards, 4:54.**
- GB – Robert Ferguson 40-yard pass from Brett Favre (Ryan Longwell kick), 11:18. Packers 24–21. **Drive: 8 plays, 27 yards, 4:05.**
- GB – Ahman Green 1-yard pass from Brett Favre (Ryan Longwell kick), 8:37. Packers 31–21. **Drive: 8 plays, 27 yards, 4:05.**
- GB – Robert Ferguson 16-yard pass from Brett Favre (Ryan Longwell kick), 3:58. Packers 38–21. **Drive: 8 plays, 27 yards, 4:05.**

**Top passers**

- GB – Brett Favre – 23/33, 278 yards, 4 TD, INT
- SDG – Drew Brees – 28/48, 363 yards, 2 TD, INT

**Top rushers**

- GB – Ahman Green – 19 rushes, 75 yards, TD
- SDG – LaDainian Tomlinson – 20 rushes, 51 yards

**Top receivers**

- GB – Donald Driver – 8 receptions, 112 yards, TD
- SDG – LaDainian Tomlinson – 11 receptions, 144 yards, 2 TD

==== Week 16: at Pittsburgh Steelers ====
Week 16: San Diego Chargers at Pittsburgh Steelers

Quarter	1	2	3	4	Total
Chargers	0	10	7	7	**24**
**Steelers**	14	7	7	12	**40**

at Heinz Field, Pittsburgh, Pennsylvania

- Date: December 21
- Game time: 4:05 p.m. EST
- Game weather: 36 °F (2 °C), relative humidity 43%, wind 15 mph, wind chill 27
- Game attendance: 52,527
- Referee: Bill Carollo
- TV announcers (CBS): Don Criqui and Steve Tasker
- Box score

Game information

**First quarter**

- PIT – Plaxico Burress 25-yard pass from Tommy Maddox (Jeff Reed kick), 8:51. Steelers 7–0. **Drive: 11 plays, 57 yards, 6:09.**
- PIT – Jerome Bettis 1-yard run (Jeff Reed kick), 0:10. Steelers 14–0. **Drive: 12 plays, 81 yards, 7:11.**

**Second quarter**

- PIT – Plaxico Burress 16-yard pass from Tommy Maddox (Jeff Reed kick), 12:49. Steelers 21–0. **Drive: 3 plays, 43 yards, 1:16.**
- SDG – LaDainian Tomlinson 5-yard run (Steve Christie kick), 7:05. Steelers 21–7. **Drive: 12 plays, 68 yards, 5:44.**
- SDG – Steve Christie 31-yard field goal, 0:04. Steelers 21–10. **Drive: 6 plays, 30 yards, 1:13.**

**Third quarter**

- SDG – Kassim Osgood 57-yard pass from Drew Brees (Steve Christie kick), 12:01. Steelers 21–17. **Drive: 6 plays, 72 yards, 2:59.**
- PIT – Hines Ward 20-yard pass from Tommy Maddox (Jeff Reed kick), 8:25. Steelers 28–17. **Drive: 2 plays, 20 yards, 0:44.**

**Fourth quarter**

- PIT – Jeff Reed 47-yard field goal, 14:15. Steelers 31–17. **Drive: 13 plays, 67 yards, 6:22.**
- SDG – LaDainian Tomlinson 2-yard run (Steve Christie kick), 10:01. Steelers 31–24. **Drive: 8 plays, 69 yards, 4:14.**
- PIT – Jeff Reed 40-yard field goal, 5:04. Steelers 34–24. **Drive: 9 plays, 44 yards, 4:57.**
- PIT – Deshea Townsend 25-yard interception return (kick failed), 4:29. Steelers 40–24.

**Top passers**

- SDG – Drew Brees – 16/26, 198 yards, TD, 2 INT
- PIT – Tommy Maddox – 11/18, 160 yards, 3 TD

**Top rushers**

- SDG – LaDainian Tomlinson – 22 rushes, 91 yards, 2 TD
- PIT – Jerome Bettis – 32 rushes, 115 yards, TD

**Top receivers**

- SDG – Kassim Osgood – 4 receptions, 102 yards, TD
- PIT – Hines Ward – 6 receptions, 94 yards, TD

==== Week 17: vs. Oakland Raiders ====
Week 17: Oakland Raiders at San Diego Chargers

Quarter	1	2	3	4	Total
Raiders	0	14	0	0	**14**
**Chargers**	7	7	0	7	**21**

at Qualcomm Stadium, San Diego, California

- Date: December 28
- Game time: 1:15 p.m. PST
- Game weather: 61 °F (16 °C), relative humidity 48%, wind 8 mph
- Game attendance: 62,222
- Referee: Bill Leavy
- TV announcers (CBS): Bill Macatee, Beasley Reece and Scott Kaplan
- Box score

Game information

**First quarter**

- SDG – LaDainian Tomlinson 2-yard run (Steve Christie kick), 7:44. Chargers 7–0. **Drive: 10 plays, 62 yards, 5:19.**

**Second quarter**

- OAK – Phillip Buchanon 80-yard punt return (Sebastian Janikowski kick), 4:39. Tied 7–7.
- SDG – David Boston 18-yard pass from Drew Brees (Steve Christie kick), 0:43. Chargers 14–7. **Drive: 6 plays, 81 yards, 0:59.**
- OAK – Doug Gabriel 85-yard kickoff return (Sebastian Janikowski kick), 0:24. Tied 14–14. **Drive: 0 plays, 0 yards, 0:19.**

**Third quarter**

- No scoring plays.

**Fourth quarter**

- SDG – LaDainian Tomlinson 2-yard run (Steve Christie kick), 11:42. Chargers 21–14. **Drive: 5 plays, 63 yards, 2:23.**

**Top passers**

- OAK – Rick Mirer – 4/11, 21 yards
- SDG – Drew Brees – 15/28, 97 yards, TD

**Top rushers**

- OAK – Zack Crockett – 10 rushes, 39 yards
- SDG – LaDainian Tomlinson – 31 rushes, 243 yards, 2 TD

**Top receivers**

- OAK – Jerry Rice – 2 receptions, 14 yards
- SDG – David Boston – 4 receptions, 43 yards, TD

=== Standings ===
AFC West
	W	L	T	PCT	DIV	CONF	PF	PA	STK
^{(2)} Kansas City Chiefs	13	3	0	.813	5–1	10–2	484	332	W1
^{(6)} Denver Broncos	10	6	0	.625	5–1	9–3	381	301	L1
Oakland Raiders	4	12	0	.250	1–5	3–9	270	379	L2
San Diego Chargers	4	12	0	.250	1–5	2–10	313	441	W1

== Awards ==
No Chargers were named to the AFC Pro Bowl squad. However, LaDainian Tomlinson was voted a second-team All-Pro by the Associated Press. He also finished in second place for the AP NFL Offensive Player of the Year award, with 8 of the 50 available votes.
