= Okanlawon =

Ọkánlàwọ́n
- Gender: Male
- Language: Yoruba

Origin
- Origin: Nigerian
- Meaning: The only male child among the female children
- Region of origin: South west, Nigeria

Ọkánlàwọ́n is a popular Nigerian male given name and surname of Yoruba origin. It means "The only male child among the female children." The name "Ọkánlàwọ́n" tells a child's position in his family, the circumstances under which a child was born.

== Notable individuals with the name ==
- Deyemi Okanlawon, Nigerian actor
- Tony Okanlawon (born 1979), American football player
- YungManny (Emmanuel Okanlawon, born 2003), American rapper
