= Jason Ball =

Jason Ball may refer to:

- Jason Ball (American football) (born 1979), former American football center
- Jason Ball (Australian footballer) (born 1972), Western Australian Australian rules football player
- Jason Ball (activist) (born 1988), political candidate and amateur Australian rules footballer

== See also ==
- Jason Beckford-Ball, British editor
