= Stephen Alexander (American football) =

American football player (born 1975)

No. 80, 81, 82, 86
- Position: Tight end

Personal information
- Born: November 7, 1975 (age 50); Chickasha, Oklahoma, U.S.
- Listed height: 6 ft 4 in (1.93 m)
- Listed weight: 250 lb (113 kg)

Career information
- High school: Chickasha (OK)
- College: Oklahoma
- NFL draft: 1998: 2nd round, 48th overall pick

Career history
- Washington Redskins (1998–2001); San Diego Chargers (2002–2003); Detroit Lions (2004); Denver Broncos (2005–2007)

Awards and highlights
- Pro Bowl (2000); First-team All-Big Eight (1995); Second-team All-Big 12 (1997)

Career NFL statistics
- Receptions: 247
- Receiving yards: 2,519
- Receiving touchdowns: 14
- Stats at Pro Football Reference

Stephen Todd Alexander (born November 7, 1975) is an American former professional football player who was a tight end in the National Football League (NFL). He was originally drafted by the Washington Redskins in the second round of the 1998 NFL draft. He played college football at Oklahoma.

Alexander was selected to the Pro Bowl while with the Redskins in 2000. He has also played for the San Diego Chargers, Detroit Lions and Denver Broncos.

== Early life ==
Alexander was a USA Today and Blue Chip Illustrated All-American at Chickasha High School, earning SuperPrep National Player-of-the-Year honors. He was all-state and a two-time all-district Defensive Player of the Year as a defensive end while lettering in basketball and track, in which he won the state high jump title (6 ft 8 in) as a junior. A member of the Oceanic Honor Society, Alexander graduated #16 in his high school class.

== College career ==
Alexander totaled 104 career receptions for 1,591 yards (15.3 avg.) with six touchdowns at the University of Oklahoma. Following an outstanding senior season, Alexander picked up second-team All-Big 12 Conference honors. He was a first-team All-Big 8 Conference selection as a sophomore, leading the conference's tight ends in receptions with 43 grabs for 580 yards (13.5 avg.) and two touchdowns. He was a member of the Gamma Rho chapter of Lambda Chi Alpha fraternity.

== NFL career statistics ==
Year	Team	Games		Receiving					Fumbles	
Year	Team	GP	GS	Rec	Yds	Avg	Lng	TD	Fum	Lost
1998	WAS	15	5	37	383	10.4	33	4	2	2
1999	WAS	15	15	29	324	11.2	27	3	0	0
2000	WAS	16	16	47	510	10.9	30	2	2	2
2001	WAS	7	5	9	85	9.4	21	0	0	0
2002	SD	14	14	45	510	11.3	32	1	1	0
2003	SD	3	0	0	0	0.0	0	0	0	0
2004	DET	16	15	41	377	9.2	30	1	0	0
2005	DEN	16	15	21	170	8.1	15	1	0	0
2006	DEN	16	14	18	160	8.9	24	2	0	0
Career		118	99	247	2,519	10.2	33	14	5	4
