= Donnie Edwards =

American football player (born 1973)

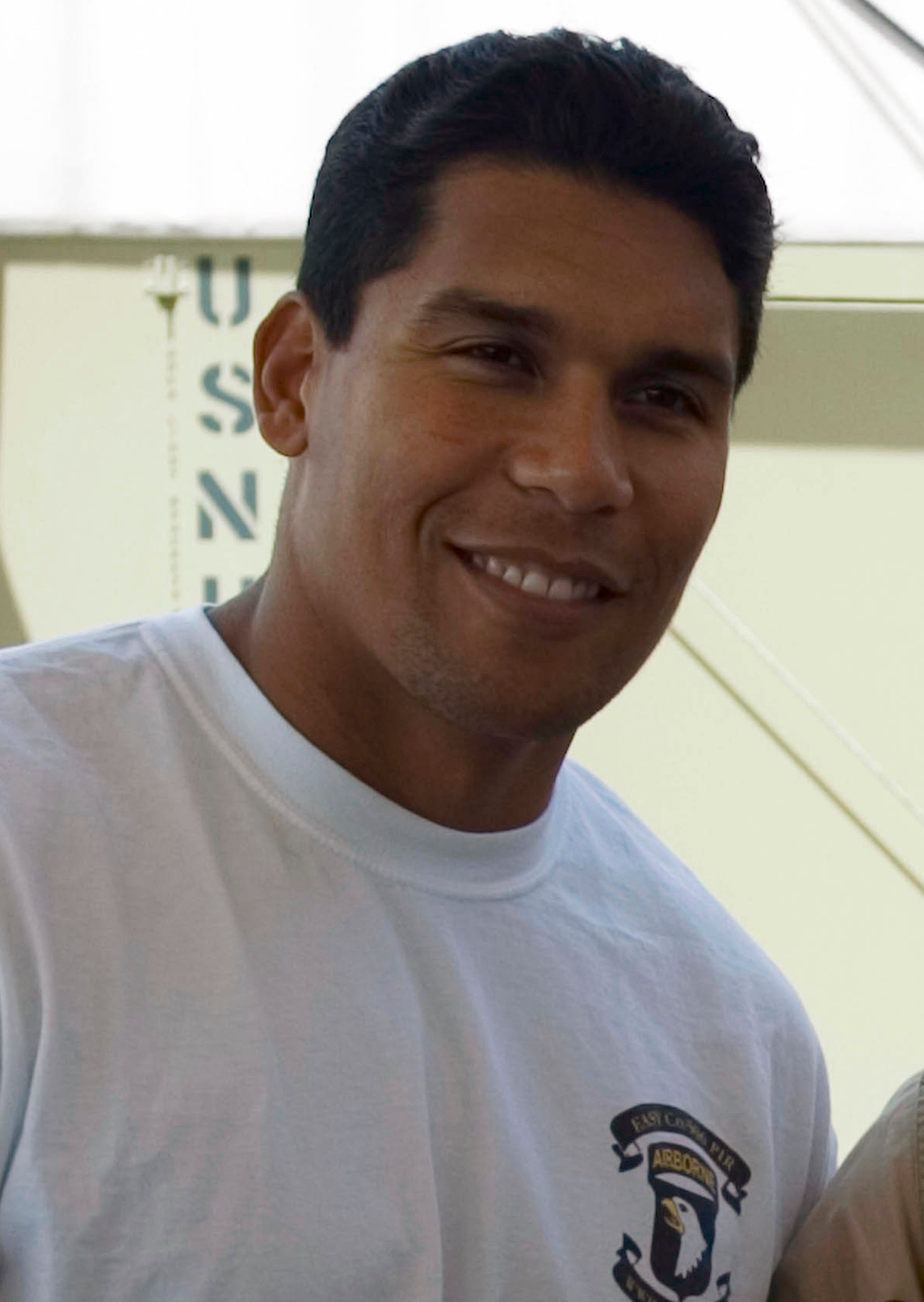
- Edwards at the Expeditionary Medical Force hospital in Kuwait

No. 59
- Position: Linebacker

Personal information
- Born: April 6, 1973 (age 53); San Diego, California, U.S.
- Listed height: 6 ft 2 in (1.88 m)
- Listed weight: 227 lb (103 kg)

Career information
- High school: Chula Vista (Chula Vista, California)
- College: UCLA
- NFL draft: 1996: 4th round, 98th overall pick

Career history
- Kansas City Chiefs (1996–2001); San Diego Chargers (2002–2006); Kansas City Chiefs (2007–2008)

Awards and highlights
- 2× Second-team All-Pro (2002, 2004); Pro Bowl (2002); NFL combined tackles co-leader (2004); NFL Alumni Linebacker of the Year (2004); Third-team All-American (1994); First-team All-Pac-10 (1994)

Career NFL statistics
- Total tackles: 1,501
- Sacks: 23.5
- Forced fumbles: 15
- Fumble recoveries: 11
- Interceptions: 28
- Defensive touchdowns: 6
- Stats at Pro Football Reference

Donnie Lewis Edwards Jr. (born April 6, 1973) is an American former professional football player who was a linebacker for 13 seasons in the National Football League (NFL) for the Kansas City Chiefs and San Diego Chargers. He played college football for the UCLA Bruins, earning third-team All-American honors in 1994. He was selected by the Chiefs in the fourth round of the 1996 NFL draft.

Edwards retired as one of only eight players in the history of the NFL to record more than 20 interceptions and 20 sacks during his career. Since his retirement in 2009, Edwards has devoted himself to philanthropic work with the Best Defense Foundation and children from underprivileged backgrounds.

== Early life ==
Edwards was born in Chula Vista, California, and is the second of eight brothers and sisters. Despite stark financial circumstances, Edwards excelled in school and athletics, where he played football, baseball, and wrestled. On the football field, as a slight linebacker at only 170 pounds, Edwards believed that academics would be his ticket to opportunity. He remains an active advocate for education, and emphasizes this point in his work with schoolchildren.

== College career ==
Edwards accepted a scholarship to UCLA where he played as a linebacker for UCLA from 1992 to 1995. Edwards left school ranked third in tackles for losses in school history with 38, and fifth in sacks in the school's history, with 22.5 sacks. He also tied the school record for sacks in a game with 4.5 sacks versus Southern Methodist University, and ranks second in school history for sacks in a single season, with 12.5 sacks. Following his junior year, he won third-team All-America honors. He also played baseball as a junior at first base and third base. Edwards was a member of the Alpha Rho chapter of Zeta Beta Tau fraternity at UCLA, and played center-field on the UCLA baseball team.

== Professional career ==
Pre-draft measurables
Height	Weight	Arm length	Hand span	40-yard dash	10-yard split	20-yard split	20-yard shuttle	Vertical jump	Broad jump	Bench press
6 ft 1 7/8 in (1.88 m)	224 lb (102 kg)	33 1/4 in (0.84 m)	9 5/8 in (0.24 m)	4.78 s	1.64 s	2.78 s	4.54 s	30.0 in (0.76 m)	9 ft 6 in (2.90 m)	17 reps

=== First stint with Chiefs ===
Edwards was drafted in the fourth round (98th overall) of the 1996 NFL draft by the Kansas City Chiefs.

On February 28, 2002, the Kansas City Chiefs officially released Edwards after they were unable to come to terms on a new contract. Edwards was released a day before receiving a $2.8 million bonus.

=== San Diego Chargers ===
On April 25, 2002, the San Diego Chargers signed Edwards to a five-year contract as an unrestricted free agent.

His first season with the squad, he made the 2002 Pro Bowl as an alternate. He was a starter for the Chargers since the time he joined the team. He averaged 154 tackles from 2003 to 2005, and made at least 100 tackles from 1997 to 2005.

After recording half a sack against the Kansas City Chiefs in a week 7 game of the 2006 season, Edwards became the 9th player in NFL history to become part of the 20/20 Club. He retired with career totals of 23.5 sacks and 28 interceptions, just nine short of the NFL record for most interceptions by a linebacker (37 by the Baltimore Colts' Don Shinnick).

At the conclusion of the 2006 NFL season, Edwards' contract was allowed to expire, making him a free agent.

During his tenure, Donnie took time to talk to and counsel youths who came to Chargers practice.

=== Second stint with Chiefs ===
On March 10, 2007, Edwards re-signed with the Kansas City Chiefs after his five-year stint with the San Diego Chargers.

Edwards was released by the Chiefs on February 24, 2009.

== Philanthropy ==
Since retiring, Edwards has devoted himself full-time to philanthropy. He donates time and money to the charitable organizations and institutions that provided positive guidance during his youth. He hosts an annual 'Dad's Day with Donnie' in San Diego, California. The event provides children who are missing a father figure the unique opportunity to spend a day with professional athletes. He is also a dedicated supporter of the Child Abuse Prevention Foundation, After School All-Stars, the Best Defense Foundation, and Jump for Life.

Edwards also supports the U.S. military. Influenced by his studies in political science at UCLA and a grandfather who served in World War II, Edwards has participated in seven United Service Organization tours. In 2018, Donnie and his wife Kathryn, started the non-profit, Best Defense Foundation. The Foundation focuses on three pillar programs—Battlefield Returns take veterans back to their battlefields; Stronghold Transitions provides retreats for newly transitioning special force operators to focus on mental health; Education Initiative to promote the preservation of the legacy of those who have served in the military.

== Personal life ==
Edwards travels between his two homes in Rancho Santa Fe, California and Brentwood, California with his wife Kathryn Eickstaedt; they appeared together on the sixth season of The Real Housewives of Beverly Hills. He is a certified yoga instructor and has served as a brand ambassador for Jaeger-LeCoultre and Panerai watches.

He is of Mexican, Native American, and African American descent.

== NFL career statistics ==
Year	Team	GP	Comb	Solo	Asst	Sacks	FF	FR	Yds	Int	Yds	Avg	Lng	TD	PD
1996	KC	15	12	8	4	0.0	0	0	0	1	22	22	22	0	2
1997	KC	16	98	76	22	2.5	3	1	0	2	15	8	12	0	8
1998	KC	15	122	78	44	6.0	1	1	0	0	0	0	0	0	2
1999	KC	16	122	97	25	3.0	1	2	0	5	50	10	28	1	8
2000	KC	16	132	113	19	1.0	0	1	0	2	45	23	42	1	5
2001	KC	16	129	97	32	2.0	1	3	0	0	0	0	0	0	4
2002	SD	16	128	100	28	0.0	0	1	0	5	95	19	46	1	10
2003	SD	16	161	122	39	0.5	1	0	0	2	27	14	15	0	8
2004	SD	16	150	104	46	1.0	3	0	0	5	49	10	30	1	13
2005	SD	16	152	112	40	3.0	2	0	0	2	15	8	14	0	11
2006	SD	16	142	98	44	2.5	2	1	0	3	11	4	8	0	7
2007	KC	16	104	85	19	2.0	1	1	0	1	18	18	18	0	3
2008	KC	7	35	26	9	0.0	0	0	0	0	0	0	0	0	0
Career		197	1,487	1,116	371	23.5	15	11	0	28	347	12	46	4	81
