= Terry Charles =

American football player (born 1979)

No. 13
- Position: Wide receiver

Personal information
- Born: July 8, 1979 (age 47); Long Beach, California, U.S.

Career information
- College: Portland State
- NFL draft: 2002: 5th round, 142nd overall pick

Career history
- San Diego Chargers (2002); Houston Texans (2004)*; → Scottish Claymores (2004)
- * Offseason or practice squad member only

Terry Charles (born July 8, 1979) is an American former professional football wide receiver in the National Football League (NFL). He was a member of the San Diego Chargers and Houston Texans.

== Professional career ==
Charles was selected 142nd overall by the Chargers in the 2002 NFL draft. Unfortunately, he suffered a torn anterior cruciate ligament in his left knee during training camp and was placed on season-ending injured reserve, effectively ending his rookie season before it could begin.

After missing out on his rookie season, Charles struggled to perform the following year and was released by the Chargers during final cuts on August 31, 2003. He received workouts with the Seattle Seahawks, Dallas Cowboys, and Houston Texans, trying to get back into the league.

Despite not playing during the 2003 season, Charles was signed to a future contract by the Texans on February 6, 2004 and was allocated to NFL Europe to play for the Scottish Claymores. He suffered another injury early in the NFL Europe season in June and was released from the Texans soon after.
