= Kevin House Jr. =

American football player (born 1979)

Kevin Nathaniel House Jr.
No. 32
- Position: Cornerback

Personal information
- Born: January 9, 1979 (age 47); St. Louis, Missouri, U.S.
- Listed height: 6 ft 0 in (1.83 m)
- Listed weight: 185 lb (84 kg)

Career information
- High school: George D. Chamberlain
- College: University of South Carolina

Career history
- New Orleans Saints (2002)*; San Diego Chargers (2002–2003); Seattle Seahawks (2005-2006)*; Cologne Centurions (2005, 2007); Denver Broncos (2007)*
- * Offseason or practice squad member only
- Stats at Pro Football Reference

Kevin Nathaniel House Jr. (born January 9, 1979) is an American former professional football player. He played for the San Diego Chargers and Seattle Seahawks of the National Football League (NFL).

House graduated from Chamberlain High School in Tampa, Florida in 1997 where he played football and baseball.

His father Kevin Sr. was a former wide receiver.
