= DeQuincy Scott =

American football player (born 1978)

No. 78
- Position: Defensive tackle

Personal information
- Born: March 5, 1978 (age 48); LaPlace, Louisiana, U.S.
- Listed height: 6 ft 1 in (1.85 m)
- Listed weight: 260 lb (118 kg)

Career information
- High school: East St. John (LA)
- College: Southern Mississippi
- NFL draft: 2001: undrafted

Career history
- San Diego Chargers (2001–2005); Minnesota Vikings (2006)*; Tennessee Titans (2006)
- * Offseason or practice squad member only

Career NFL statistics
- Games played: 59
- Games started: 2
- Sacks: 14.5
- Tackles: 49
- Stats at Pro Football Reference

DeQuincy Scott (born March 5, 1978) is an American former professional football player who was a defensive tackle in the National Football League (NFL). He played college football for the Southern Miss Golden Eagles was signed as an undrafted free agent in 2001 by the San Diego Chargers. He has also played for the Tennessee Titans.

== High school ==
Scott attended East St. John High School in Reserve and was a letterman in baseball and football.
