= Tony Okanlawon =

American football player (born 1979)

No. 34
- Position: Defensive back

Personal information
- Born: March 4, 1979 (age 47); Lagos, Nigeria
- Listed height: 5 ft 11 in (1.80 m)
- Listed weight: 187 lb (85 kg)

Career information
- High school: DeMatha Catholic (Hyattsville, Maryland, U.S.)
- College: Maryland
- NFL draft: 2002: undrafted

Career history
- San Diego Chargers (2002–2003); Philadelphia Soul (2006)*
- * Offseason or practice squad member only

Awards and highlights
- First-team All-ACC (2001)

Career NFL statistics
- Games played: 1
- Stats at Pro Football Reference

Anthony A. Okanlawon (born March 4, 1979) is a Nigerian American former professional football defensive back who played one game in the National Football League (NFL) for the San Diego Chargers. He played college football at Maryland.

== Early life and education ==
Okanlawon was born on March 4, 1979, in Lagos, Nigeria. He was the second-oldest of seven children. He later moved to the United States where he attended DeMatha Catholic High School in Maryland and graduated in 1998, having been named first-team all-conference and honorable mention USA Today All-American as a senior.

Okanlawon committed to the University of Maryland and saw immediate playing time as a true freshman, making six starts and 39 tackles. As a sophomore in 1999, he started three games and played in a total of nine, missing several games due to a pulled hamstring. Okanlawon made 26 solo tackles and 31 total, while also recording three passes defended and a fumble recovery.

In the season finale of the 1999 season, Okanlawon allowed Billy McMullen to score the game-winning touchdown in the final minute, which ended any hope of Maryland making the bowl game. He used the play as motivation for the 2000 season and was named Maryland's most improved player in spring drills. He started eleven games as a junior, making 40 tackles and his first career interception (against Virginia).

As a senior, Okanlawon started the season with an interception in each of the first two games and by the end of week five, had the national lead in interceptions. Okanlawon missed four games due to a "medical issue", which coach Ralph Friedgen said he "was not at liberty to discuss." He returned for the final game of the season, starting in a loss in the Orange Bowl to Florida.

Despite missing four games, Okanlawon was named first-team All-Atlantic Coast Conference (ACC) at the end of the year. He finished the season with five interceptions and ten passes defended. He finished his college career with 38 games played, 141 total tackles and six interceptions.

== Professional career ==
After going unselected in the 2002 NFL draft, Okanlawon was signed by the San Diego Chargers as an undrafted free agent. In a preseason game against the Seattle Seahawks, he returned an interception 55 yards for a touchdown to help the Chargers win 24–14. He made the final roster but was inactive for the first two games, and was placed on injured reserve prior to week three, ending his season.

Okanlawon was released at the final roster cuts in 2003. After an injury to safety Kwamie Lassiter, he was re-signed on November 20. He was inactive for each game before making his NFL debut in the 24–40 loss to the Pittsburgh Steelers on December 21. It was the only professional game in his career.

Okanlawon was waived by the Chargers on June 17, 2004.

On January 5, 2006, Okanlawon was signed by the Philadelphia Soul of the Arena Football League (AFL). He was waived on January 17, without appearing in a game.
