= Jason Ball (American football) =

American football player (born 1979)

No. 60
- Position: Center

Personal information
- Born: March 21, 1979 (age 47); Fayetteville, North Carolina, U.S.
- Listed height: 6 ft 2 in (1.88 m)
- Listed weight: 301 lb (137 kg)

Career information
- College: New Hampshire
- NFL draft: 2002: undrafted

Career history
- San Diego Chargers (2002–2004); Miami Dolphins (2004)

Career NFL statistics
- Games played: 27
- Games started: 23
- Fumble recoveries: 1
- Stats at Pro Football Reference

Jason Ball (born March 21, 1979) is an American former professional football player who was a center for three seasons with the San Diego Chargers of the National Football League (NFL). He played college football for the New Hampshire Wildcats from 1998 to 2001. Undrafted in the 2002 NFL draft, he signed with the Chargers as a free agent. He played professional football as a center from the Chargers from 2002 to 2004. He appeared in a total of 27 NFL games, 23 of them as a starter. As a rookie in 2002, he was voted as the Chargers' best lineman.
