= 2006 San Diego Chargers season =

NFL team 47th season

- Owner: Alex Spanos
- General manager: A. J. Smith
- Head coach: Marty Schottenheimer
- Offensive coordinator: Cam Cameron
- Defensive coordinator: Wade Phillips
- Home stadium: Qualcomm Stadium

Results
- Record: 14–2
- Division place: 1st AFC West
- Playoffs: Lost Divisional Playoffs (vs. Patriots) 21–24
- All-Pros: 6: RB LaDainian Tomlinson (1st team); FB Lorenzo Neal (1st team); TE Antonio Gates (1st team); DT Jamal Williams (1st team); OLB Shawne Merriman (1st team); K Nate Kaeding (2nd team)
- Pro Bowlers: 11: QB Philip Rivers; RB LaDainian Tomlinson; FB Lorenzo Neal; TE Antonio Gates; T Marcus McNeill; C Nick Hardwick; DT Jamal Williams; OLB Shawne Merriman; K Nate Kaeding; ST Kassim Osgood; LS David Binn

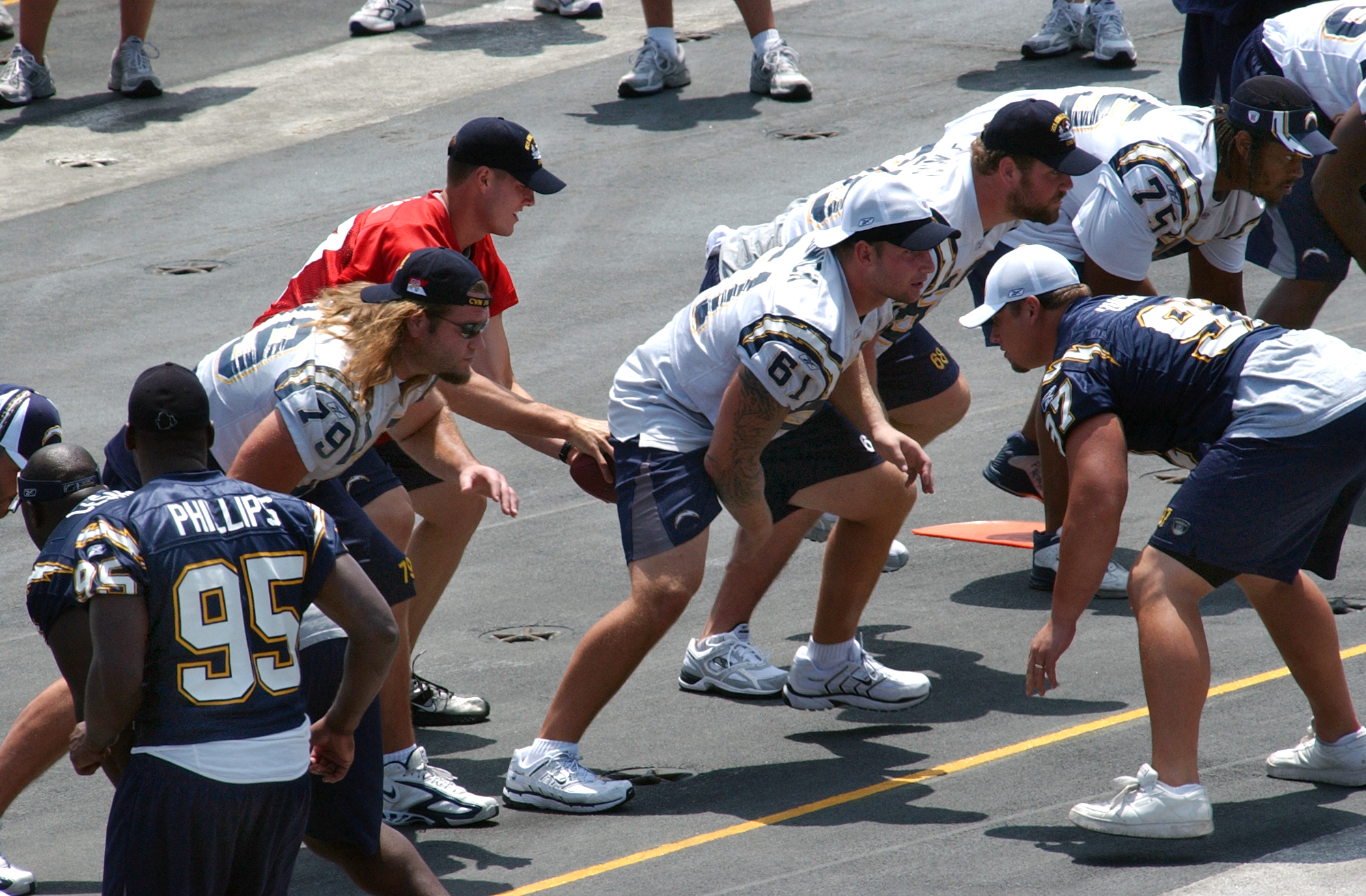
Chargers players (including quarterback Philip Rivers) practice aboard the USS Ronald Reagan on August 11, 2006

The 2006 season was the San Diego Chargers' 37th season in the National Football League (NFL), the 47th overall and the fifth and final campaign under head coach Marty Schottenheimer. They improved on their 9–7 record in 2005 and finished the campaign as the No. 1 seed in the AFC ending the season at 14–2, the best record in the NFL in 2006 and also the best for Schottenheimer in his 21 seasons as an NFL head coach. Their two regular season losses were by a combined 6 points. However, the team would experience a disappointing home-field playoff loss for the second time in the past three seasons losing in the final minutes, this time to the New England Patriots 24–21. This was the first of four consecutive AFC West titles for the Chargers. The Chargers won all 8 regular season games at Qualcomm.

Running back LaDainian Tomlinson led the league in rushing with 1,815 yards, as well as setting NFL single-season records for rushing touchdowns (28) and total touchdowns (31). It was the final season the Chargers wore the unis they had worn since the 1988 season.

The 2006 Chargers are widely considered to be one of the greatest teams to not make the Super Bowl.

== Off-season ==
The Chargers did not re-sign All–Pro quarterback Drew Brees to a contract, Brees had suffered a torn labrum in his throwing shoulder in the final game of the season, and turned instead to 2004 1st round selection Philip Rivers. Brees would later sign a contract with the New Orleans Saints as a free agent and make a complete recovery.

Chargers ownership announced in January that the team would no longer attempt to place a proposal for a new stadium on the November ballot as they were not able to locate private partners to facilitate financing of the project. The team had begun talks with city officials in 2002 stating that Qualcomm Stadium was inadequate to meet the financial needs of the franchise, and that they needed the city's help in building a new stadium to remain competitive.

== 2006 NFL draft ==
In the NFL draft, the Chargers used their first pick on Florida State cornerback Antonio Cromartie. They used their second pick on Auburn offensive tackle Marcus McNeill. The remainder of their draft picks were Clemson quarterback Charlie Whitehurst, Iowa State linebacker Tim Dobbins, Kansas State offensive tackle Jeromey Clary, Virginia kicker Kurt Smith, North Carolina defensive end Chase Page, and Virginia Tech offensive tackle Jimmy Martin.

== NFL draft ==
2006 San Diego Chargers draft
Round	Pick	Player	Position	College	Notes
1	19	Antonio Cromartie *	CB	Florida State	
2	50	Marcus McNeill *	OT	Auburn	
3	81	Charlie Whitehurst	QB	Clemson	
5	151	Tim Dobbins	LB	Iowa State	
6	187	Jeromey Clary	OT	Kansas State	
6	188	Kurt Smith	K	Virginia	from Miami
7	225	Chase Page	DT	North Carolina	
7	227	Jimmy Martin	OT	Virginia Tech	from Minnesota
Made roster † Pro Football Hall of Fame * Made at least one Pro Bowl during career

== Training camp ==
Expectations varied for the Chargers' 2006 season. Questions centered on the play of the untested QB Rivers in his first season starting, and with the offensive line, especially at the crucial left tackle position. OLT Roman Oben injury in 2005 had a negative impact on all aspects of the offense and his replacement Lender Jordan ability to protect QB Rivers blindside was unproven. Jordan was injured in training camp and 2nd round draft pick OT Marcus McNeill landed the starting job and went on to have a Pro Bowl season. Defensively, the front seven remained talented and solid. LB depth was tested with Steve Foley's off-the-field injury; however, his replacement OLB Shaun Phillips (42 tackles, 23 assists, 11.5 sacks) came through with a major quality performance. The unit returned numerous key players, including nose tackle Jamal Williams, DE Luis Castillo, DE Igor Olshansky and 2005 Defensive Rookie of the Year Shawne Merriman, that made the Chargers the best team in the NFL against the run in 2005 season. Another area of concern was in the secondary, Cromartie, who sat out his last season at Florida State with a knee injury, is talented but inexperience was not expected to contribute right away . Cromartie filled the 3rd CB role for the team and pressed starting CB Drayton Florence for playing time. Safety play became more of a concern particularly with the arrest of DB Terrence Kiel by federal law enforcement officials on drug charges during the regular season and the re-injury to DB Bhawoh Jue's knee.

== Personnel ==
=== Staff ===
2006 San Diego Chargers staff
Front office: Owner – Alex Spanos; President/chief executive officer – Dean Spanos; Executive vice president – Michael Spanos; Executive vice president/general manager – A. J. Smith; Assistant general manager/director of player personnel – Buddy Nix; Vice president of football operations – Ed McGuire; Director of college scouting – Jimmy Raye; Director of pro scouting – Dennis Abraham; Assistant director of college scouting – John Spanos; Head coaches: Head coach – Marty Schottenheimer; Offensive coaches: Offensive coordinator – Cam Cameron; Quarterbacks – John Ramsdell; Running backs – Clarence Shelmon; Wide receivers – James Lofton; Tight ends – Rob Chudzinski; Offensive line – Jack Henry; Assistant Offensive line – Hal Hunter	Defensive coaches: Defensive coordinator – Wade Phillips; Defensive line – Wayne Nunnely; Linebackers – Greg Manusky; Assistant linebackers/quality control – John Pagano; Secondary – Brian Stewart; Special teams coaches: Special teams – Steve Crosby; Strength and conditioning: Strength and conditioning – Dave Redding; Assistant strength and conditioning – Matt Schiotz

=== Roster ===
2006 San Diego Chargers roster
Quarterbacks (QB): 17 Philip Rivers; 7 Billy Volek; 6 Charlie Whitehurst; Running backs (RB): 41 Lorenzo Neal FB; 34 Andrew Pinnock FB; 21 LaDainian Tomlinson; 33 Michael Turner KR; Wide receivers (WR): 82 Greg Camarillo; 84 Az-Zahir Hakim; 83 Vincent Jackson; 87 Keenan McCardell PR; 81 Kassim Osgood; 88 Eric Parker PR; Tight ends (TE): 85 Antonio Gates; 89 Ryan Krause; 86 Brandon Manumaleuna	Offensive linemen (OL): 68 Kris Dielman G; 79 Mike Goff G; 61 Nick Hardwick C; 71 Cory Lekkerkerker T; 73 Marcus McNeill T; 63 Scott Mruczkowski C/G; 72 Roman Oben T; 70 Shane Olivea T; 65 Cory Withrow C; Defensive linemen (DL): 97 Ryon Bingham DE; 93 Luis Castillo DE; 74 Jacques Cesaire DE; 91 Brandon McKinney NT; 99 Igor Olshansky DE; 98 Derreck Robinson DE; 76 Jamal Williams NT	Linebackers (LB): 54 Stephen Cooper ILB; 51 Tim Dobbins ILB; 59 Donnie Edwards ILB; 58 Randall Godfrey ILB; 92 Marques Harris OLB; 56 Shawne Merriman OLB; 95 Shaun Phillips OLB; 52 Carlos Polk OLB; 57 Matt Wilhelm ILB; Defensive backs (DB): 31 Antonio Cromartie CB/KR; 29 Drayton Florence CB; 24 Cletis Gordon CB/KR/PR; 28 Steve Gregory CB; 42 Clinton Hart SS; 23 Quentin Jammer CB; 27 Bhawoh Jue FS; 48 Terrence Kiel SS; 20 Marlon McCree FS; Special teams (ST): 50 David Binn LS; 10 Nate Kaeding K; 5 Mike Scifres P	Practice squad: -- Ricky Bryant WR; 66 Jeromey Clary T; 38 Gabe Franklin CB; 46 Kelly Griffeth TE; 22 Tyronne Gross RB; -- Kurt Kahui LB; -- Tyler King DE; 26 Ray Perkins RB; Reserve: 80 Malcom Floyd WR (IR); 53 Steve Foley LB (NF-Inj.); 75 Leander Jordan T (IR); -- Aaron Shea TE (IR); 43 Darren Sproles RB (IR); Rookies in italics 53 active, 5 reserve, 8 practice squad

== Preseason ==
Week	Date	Opponent	Result	Record	Venue	Recap
1	August 12	Green Bay Packers	W 17–3	1–0	Qualcomm Stadium	Recap
2	August 18	Chicago Bears	L 3–24	1–1	Soldier Field	Recap
3	August 26	Seattle Seahawks	W 31–20	2–1	Qualcomm Stadium	Recap
4	September 1	San Francisco 49ers	L 14–23	2–2	Monster Park	Recap

== Regular season ==
=== Schedule ===
Week	Date	Opponent	Result	Record	Venue	GameBook	Recap
1	September 11	at Oakland Raiders	W 27–0	1–0	McAfee Coliseum	Gamebook	Recap
2	September 17	Tennessee Titans	W 40–7	2–0	Qualcomm Stadium	Gamebook	Recap
3	Bye						
4	October 1	at Baltimore Ravens	L 13–16	2–1	M&T Bank Stadium	Gamebook	Recap
5	October 8	Pittsburgh Steelers	W 23–13	3–1	Qualcomm Stadium	Gamebook	Recap
6	October 15	at San Francisco 49ers	W 48–19	4–1	Monster Park	Gamebook	Recap
7	October 22	at Kansas City Chiefs	L 27–30	4–2	Arrowhead Stadium	Gamebook	Recap
8	October 29	St. Louis Rams	W 38–24	5–2	Qualcomm Stadium	Gamebook	Recap
9	November 5	Cleveland Browns	W 32–25	6–2	Qualcomm Stadium	Gamebook	Recap
10	November 12	at Cincinnati Bengals	W 49–41	7–2	Paul Brown Stadium	Gamebook	Recap
11	November 19	at Denver Broncos	W 35–27	8–2	Invesco Field at Mile High	Gamebook	Recap
12	November 26	Oakland Raiders	W 21–14	9–2	Qualcomm Stadium	Gamebook	Recap
13	December 3	at Buffalo Bills	W 24–21	10–2	Ralph Wilson Stadium	Gamebook	Recap
14	December 10	Denver Broncos	W 48–20	11–2	Qualcomm Stadium	Gamebook	Recap
15	December 17	Kansas City Chiefs	W 20–9	12–2	Qualcomm Stadium	Gamebook	Recap
16	December 24	at Seattle Seahawks	W 20–17	13–2	Qwest Field	Gamebook	Recap
17	December 31	Arizona Cardinals	W 27–20	14–2	Qualcomm Stadium	Gamebook	Recap

=== Game summaries ===
==== Week 1: at Oakland Raiders ====
Week 1: San Diego Chargers at Oakland Raiders

Quarter	1	2	3	4	Total
Chargers	3	10	0	14	27
Raiders	0	0	0	0	0

at McAfee Coliseum, Oakland, California

- Date: September 11
- Game time: 7:25 p.m. PDT
- Game weather: 74 °F (23 °C), relative humidity 51%, wind 8 mph
- Game attendance: 62,578
- Referee: Bill Leavy
- TV announcers (ESPN): Brad Nessler, Ron Jaworski, Dick Vermeil and Bonnie Bernstein
- Box score

Game information

First quarter

- SDG – Nate Kaeding 47-yard field goal, 3:57. Chargers 3–0. Drive: 11 plays, 51 yards, 6:22.

Second quarter

- SDG – LaDainian Tomlinson 1-yard run ([Nate Kaeding kick), 14:57. Chargers 10–0. Drive: 5 plays, 66 yards, 2:27.
- SDG – Nate Kaeding 29-yard field goal, 5:36. Chargers 13–0. Drive: 12 plays, 64 yards, 6:52.

Third quarter

- No scoring plays.

Fourth quarter

- SDG – Antonio Gates 4-yard pass from Philip Rivers (Nate Kaeding kick), 9:56. Chargers 20–0. Drive: 8 plays, 58 yards, 4:48.
- SDG – Michael Turner 1-yard run ([Nate Kaeding kick), 4:34. Chargers 27–0. Drive: 3 plays, 9 yards, 1:34.

Top passers

- SDG – Philip Rivers – 8/11, 108 yards, TD
- OAK – Aaron Brooks – 6/14, 68 yards

Top rushers

- SDG – LaDainian Tomlinson – 31 rushes, 131 yards, TD
- OAK – Justin Fargas – 5 rushes, 35 yards

Top receivers

- SDG – Eric Parker – 1 reception, 38 yards
- OAK – Randy Moss – 4 receptions, 47 yards

The Chargers opened the season on September 11, 2006, with a 27–0 victory over the division rival Oakland Raiders. This second game of a Monday Night Football doubleheader marked the first time the Chargers had shut out the Raiders since a 44–0 win in 1961.

LaDainian Tomlinson led the Chargers with 31 carries for 131 yards, while Philip Rivers, in his debut as an NFL starting quarterback, completed 8 of 11 pass attempts for 108 yards with one touchdown pass and no interceptions. The Chargers' defense stifled the Raiders' running game, holding Raiders RB Lamont Jordan to 20 yards on 10 carries, and recorded 9 quarterback sacks against Raiders QBs Aaron Brooks and Andrew Walter. Three of those sacks belonged to second-year LB Shawne Merriman.

With the win, the Chargers extended their winning streak against Oakland to six games, while head coach Marty Schottenheimer improved his head coaching record against the Raiders to 26–7. Schottenheimer also earned his 187th career victory, passing Chuck Knox to become the seventh-winning-est head coach in NFL history.

That shutout also marked the second time ever that Oakland had been shut out in their own stadium, the second being the Denver Broncos and the third being the St. Louis Rams as the Chargers picked up their 6th straight win over the Raiders and started their season 1–0.

==== Week 2: vs. Tennessee Titans ====
Week 2: Tennessee Titans at San Diego Chargers

Quarter	1	2	3	4	Total
Titans	0	0	0	7	7
Chargers	3	17	6	14	40

at Qualcomm Stadium, San Diego, California

- Date: September 17
- Game time: 1:15 p.m. PDT
- Game weather: 88 °F (31 °C), relative humidity 5%, wind 17 mph
- Game attendance: 64,344
- Referee: Ed Hochuli
- TV announcers (CBS): Bill Macatee and Richard Baldinger
- Box score

Game information

First quarter

- SDG – Nate Kaeding 28-yard field goal, 6:27. Chargers 3–0. Drive: 9 plays, 43 yards, 5:10.

Second quarter

- SDG – LaDainian Tomlinson 4-yard run ([Nate Kaeding kick), 13:14. Chargers 10–0. Drive: 14 plays, 85 yards, 6:44.
- SDG – LaDainian Tomlinson 8-yard run ([Nate Kaeding kick), 9:02. Chargers 17–0. Drive: 5 plays, 41 yards, 2:39.
- SDG – Nate Kaeding 31-yard field goal, 0:17. Chargers 20–0. Drive: 10 plays, 62 yards, 3:50.

Third quarter

- SDG – Nate Kaeding 35-yard field goal, 6:55. Chargers 23–0. Drive: 13 plays, 54 yards, 6:23.
- SDG – Nate Kaeding 44-yard field goal, 3:44. Chargers 26–0. Drive: 6 plays, 18 yards, 2:10.

Fourth quarter

- SDG – Vincent Jackson 12-yard pass from Philip Rivers (Nate Kaeding kick), 12:15. Chargers 33–0. Drive: 5 plays, 54 yards, 2:55.
- TEN – Drew Bennett 18-yard pass from Vince Young (Rob Bironas kick), 3:09. Chargers 33–7. Drive: 11 plays, 69 yards, 4:50.
- SDG – Charlie Whitehurst 14-yard run (Nate Kaeding kick), 1:53. Chargers 40–7. Drive: 3 plays, 88 yards, 1:16.

Top passers

- TEN – Vince Young – 7/20, 106 yards, TD
- SDG – Philip Rivers – 25/35, 235 yards, TD

Top rushers

- TEN – Vince Young – 5 rushes, 24 yards
- SDG – Michael Turner – 13 rushes, 138 yards

Top receivers

- TEN – Bo Scaife – 3 receptions, 53 yards
- SDG – Keenan McCardell – 5 receptions, 58 yards

The Chargers hosted the Tennessee Titans in their Week 2 home-opener, winning 40–7. Tomlinson rushed for two touchdowns and tied Lance Alworth for the Chargers record for most career touchdowns with 83. Vince Young spoiled the Chargers bid for a second straight shutout by throwing a touchdown pass late in the fourth quarter, though the 7 straight quarters of holding the opponent scoreless were the most to open a season since the 1977 Raiders. With the win, the Chargers went into their bye week at 2–0.

Philip Rivers completed 25 passes out of 35 attempts, racking up 235 yards and a touchdown.

==== Week 4: at Baltimore Ravens ====
Week 4: San Diego Chargers at Baltimore Ravens

Quarter	1	2	3	4	Total
Chargers	7	6	0	0	13
Ravens	7	0	0	9	16

at M&T Bank Stadium, Baltimore, Maryland

- Date: October 1
- Game time: 1:02 p.m. EDT
- Game weather: 68 °F (20 °C), relative humidity 59%, wind 7 mph
- Game attendance: 70,743
- Referee: Mike Carey
- TV announcers (CBS): Kevin Harlan and Rich Gannon
- Box score

Game information

First quarter

- SDG – Malcom Floyd 31-yard pass from Philip Rivers (Nate Kaeding kick), 10:21. Chargers 7–0. Drive: 9 plays, 69 yards, 4:39.

Second quarter

- BAL – Daniel Wilcox 5-yard pass from Steve McNair (Matt Stover kick), 5:28. Tied 7–7. Drive: 5 plays, 22 yards, 2:52.
- SDG – Nate Kaeding 34-yard field goal, 14:51. Chargers 10–7. Drive: 10 plays, 46 yards, 5:37.
- SDG – Nate Kaeding 54-yard field goal, 1:51. Chargers 13–7. Drive: 5 plays, 20 yards, 1:17.

Third quarter

- No scoring plays.

Fourth quarter

- BAL – Safety, Mike Scifres ran out of bounds in end zone, 3:12. Chargers 13–9.
- BAL – Todd Heap 10-yard pass from Steve McNair (Matt Stover kick), 0:34. Ravens 16–13. Drive: 6 plays, 60 yards, 2:38.

Top passers

- SDG – Philip Rivers – 13/22, 145 yards, TD, INT
- BAL – Steve McNair – 17/30, 158 yards, 2 TD, 2 INT

Top rushers

- SDG – LaDainian Tomlinson – 26 rushes, 98 yards
- BAL – Jamal Lewis – 15 rushes, 34 yards

Top receivers

- SDG – Antonio Gates – 4 receptions, 41 yards
- BAL – Todd Heap – 4 receptions, 60 yards, TD

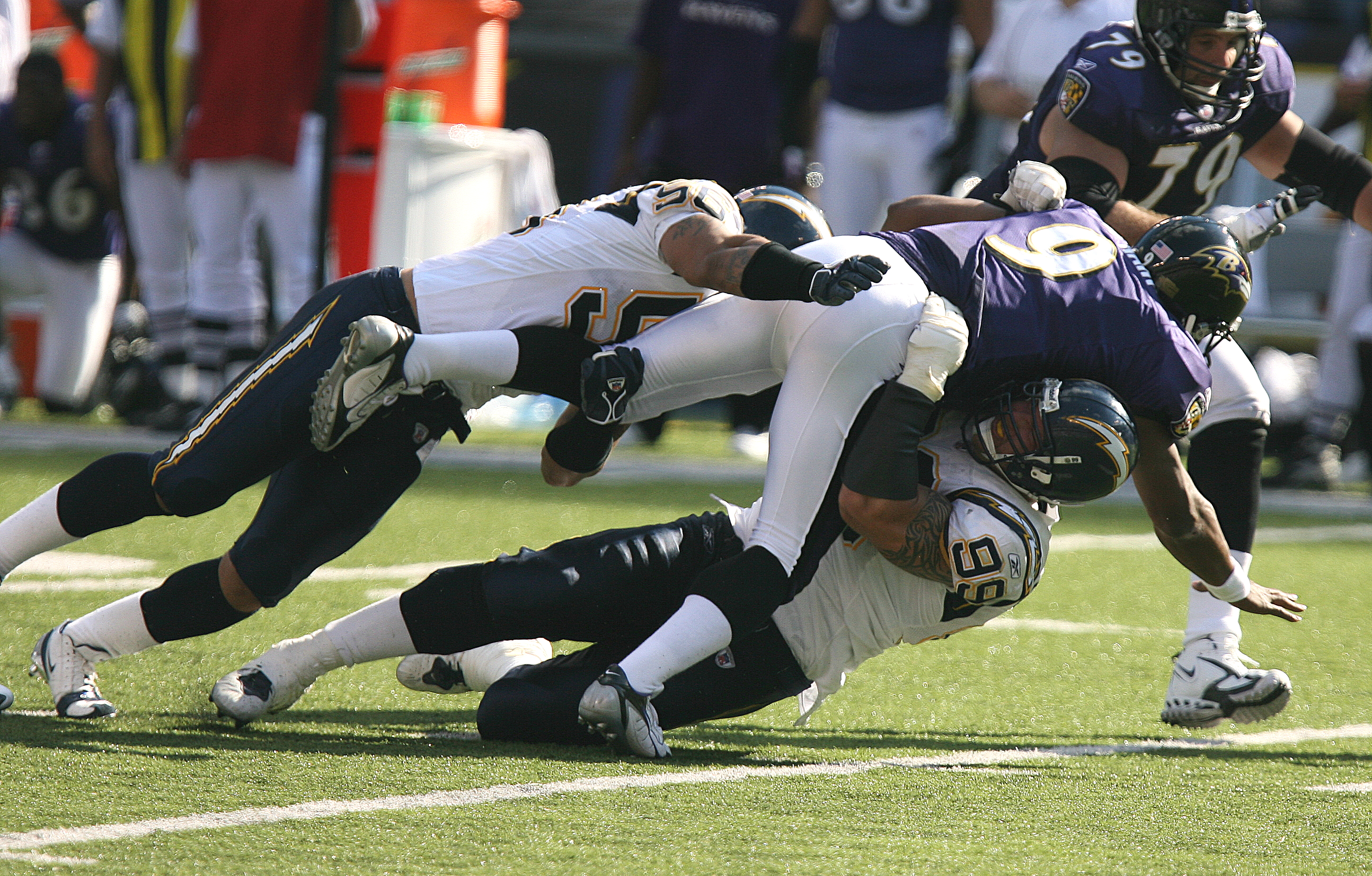
San Diego tackles Baltimore's Steve McNair in week 4

Coming off of their Bye, the Chargers traveled to M&T Bank Stadium to take on the Baltimore Ravens. The Chargers drew first blood as QB Philip Rivers completed a 31-yard TD pass to WR Malcom Floyd. However, the Ravens would tie the game up with QB Steve McNair completing a 5-yard TD pass to TE Daniel Wilcox. In the second quarter, kicker Nate Kaeding would give the Chargers some comfort, as he kicked a 34-yard and a 54-yard field goal (a then career long) to give San Diego the lead at halftime.

After a scoreless third quarter, the Ravens slowly started to climb back. Late in the fourth quarter, after giving Baltimore an intentional safety (instead of punting deep from their own end zone), the Chargers hoped that their defense could hold up and prevent any chance of a comeback. However, McNair led the offense throughout the closing minutes and scored the game-winning touchdown with a 10-yard TD pass to TE Todd Heap. With their loss, the Chargers fell to 2–1.

==== Week 5: vs. Pittsburgh Steelers ====
Week 5: Pittsburgh Steelers at San Diego Chargers

Quarter	1	2	3	4	Total
Steelers	7	6	0	0	13
Chargers	0	7	10	6	23

at Qualcomm Stadium, San Diego, California

- Date: October 8
- Game time: 5:15 p.m. PDT
- Game weather: 67 °F (19 °C), relative humidity 63%, wind 9 mph
- Game attendance: 67,837
- Referee: Bill Vinovich
- TV announcers (NBC): Al Michaels, John Madden and Andrea Kremer
- Box score

Game information

First quarter

- PIT – Willie Parker 9-yard run (Jeff Reed kick), 0:35. Steelers 7–0. Drive: 5 plays, 61 yards, 2:28.

Second quarter

- PIT – Jeff Reed 39-yard field goal, 4:55. Steelers 10–0. Drive: 11 plays, 63 yards, 6:24.
- SDG – Malcom Floyd 9-yard pass from Philip Rivers (Nate Kaeding kick), 1:11. Steelers 10–7. Drive: 13 plays, 80 yards, 3:44.
- PIT – Jeff Reed 44-yard field goal, 0:09. Steelers 13–7. Drive: 7 plays, 54 yards, 1:02.

Third quarter

- SDG – Nate Kaeding 28-yard field goal, 11:30. Steelers 13–10. Drive: 7 plays, 32 yards, 3:30.
- SDG – Antonio Gates 22-yard pass from Philip Rivers (Nate Kaeding kick), 5:21. Chargers 17–13. Drive: 11 plays, 91 yards, 4:43.

Fourth quarter

- SDG – Nate Kaeding 33-yard field goal, 8:59. Chargers 20–13. Drive: 14 plays, 63 yards, 7:41.
- SDG – Nate Kaeding 22-yard field goal, 1:05. Chargers 23–13. Drive: 11 plays, 54 yards, 4:53.

Top passers

- PIT – Ben Roethlisberger – 20/31, 220 yards, 2 INT
- SDG – Philip Rivers – 24/37, 242 yards, 2 TD, INT

Top rushers

- PIT – Willie Parker – 14 rushes, 57 yards, TD
- SDG – Michael Turner – 11 rushes, 56 yards

Top receivers

- PIT – Hines Ward – 4 receptions, 49 yards
- SDG – Eric Parker – 5 receptions, 86 yards

Hoping to rebound from their last-second loss to the Ravens, the Chargers flew back home and donned their throwback uniforms for a Sunday Night match-up with the defending Super Bowl champions, the Pittsburgh Steelers. The Chargers struggled early as their offense actually had −2 total yards, while the defense gave up a 9-yard TD run by RB Willie Parker in the first quarter. In the second quarter, the Chargers continued to trail, as Steelers kicker Jeff Reed completed a 39-yard field goal. San Diego would start to get back into the game, as QB Philip Rivers completed a 9-yard TD pass to WR Malcom Floyd. In the third quarter, the Chargers charged right into the lead, as kicker Nate Kaeding kicked a 28-yard field goal, while Rivers hooked up with TE Antonio Gates for a 22-yard TD strike. In the fourth quarter, Kaeding put the game away with a 33-yard and a 22-yard field goal, while the defense squashed any hope of a Steeler comeback as the Chargers improved to 3–1.

==== Week 6: at San Francisco 49ers ====
Week 6: San Diego Chargers at San Francisco 49ers

Quarter	1	2	3	4	Total
Chargers	14	21	3	10	48
49ers	7	12	0	0	19

at Monster Park, San Francisco, California

- Date: October 15
- Game time: 1:15 p.m. PDT
- Game weather: 57 °F (14 °C), relative humidity 72%, wind 12 mph
- Game attendance: 68,137
- Referee: Tony Corrente
- TV announcers (CBS): Ian Eagle and Solomon Wilcots
- Box score

Game information

First quarter

- SDG – Antonio Gates 57-yard pass from Philip Rivers (Nate Kaeding kick), 12:00. Chargers 7–0. Drive: 6 plays, 78 yards, 3:00.
- SF – Bryan Gilmore 15-yard pass from Alex Smith (Joe Nedney kick), 9:00. Tied 7–7. Drive: 5 plays, 74 yards, 3:00.
- SDG – LaDainian Tomlinson 5-yard run (Nate Kaeding kick), 2:45. Chargers 14–7. Drive: 11 plays, 91 yards, 6:15.

Second quarter

- SF – Joe Nedney 42-yard field goal, 14:44. Chargers 14–10. Drive: 9 plays, 50 yards, 3:01.
- SDG – Vincent Jackson 33-yard pass from Philip Rivers (Nate Kaeding kick), 11:57. Chargers 21–10. Drive: 5 plays, 77 yards, 2:47.
- SDG – LaDainian Tomlinson 1-yard run (Nate Kaeding kick), 6:20. Chargers 28–10. Drive: 5 plays, 72 yards, 3:17.
- SF – Moran Norris 2-yard pass from Alex Smith (Joe Nedney kick), 3:32. Chargers 28–17. Drive: 6 plays, 74 yards, 2:48.
- SF – Safety, Philip Rivers penalized for intentional grounding in end zone, 3:12. Chargers 28–19.
- SDG – LaDainian Tomlinson 1-yard run (Nate Kaeding kick), 0:33. Chargers 35–19. Drive: 9 plays, 35 yards, 2:26.

Third quarter

- SDG – Nate Kaeding 24-yard field goal, 9:09. Chargers 38–19. Drive: 9 plays, 45 yards, 5:00.

Fourth quarter

- SDG – Nate Kaeding 44-yard field goal, 13:29. Chargers 41–19. Drive: 7 plays, 38 yards, 2:56.
- SDG – LaDainian Tomlinson 5-yard run (Nate Kaeding kick), 4:20. Chargers 48–19. Drive: 13 plays, 56 yards, 7:36.

Top passers

- SDG – Philip Rivers – 29/39, 334 yards, 2 TD
- SF – Alex Smith – 20/31, 214 yards, 2 TD, INT

Top rushers

- SDG – LaDainian Tomlinson – 21 rushes, 71 yards, 4 TD
- SF – Frank Gore – 10 rushes, 55 yards

Top receivers

- SDG – Eric Parker – 7 receptions, 88 yards
- SF – Antonio Bryant – 4 receptions, 78 yards

Riding high from their win over Pittsburgh, the Chargers traveled up north to Candlestick Park for a Week 6 fight with their other state rival, the San Francisco 49ers. In the first quarter, San Diego struck first as QB Philip Rivers completed a 57-yard TD pass to TE Antonio Gates, yet the Niners tied the game with QB Alex Smith completing a 15-yard TD pass to WR Bryan Gilmore. RB LaDainian Tomlinson helped the Chargers retake the lead, as he got a 5-yard TD run. In a topsy-turvy second quarter, points were flying everywhere. It began with 49ers kicker Joe Nedney kicking a 42-yard field goal. Afterwards, the Chargers retook the lead as Rivers hooked up with WR Vincent Jackson on a 33-yard TD strike, followed by Tomlinson getting a 1-yard TD run. Then, Smith connected with FB Moran Norris on a 2-yard pass for San Francisco, which was followed up with the Niners getting a safety from an intentional grounding penalty. Tomlinson would get another 1-yard TD run to end the quarter. In the second half, San Diego scored 13 unanswered points to seal the game, with kicker Nate Kaeding kicking two field goals (24-yarder in the third quarter and a 44-yarder in the fourth quarter) and Tomlinson iced the game with one more 5-yard touchdown run. With their victory, the Chargers improved to 4–1.

==== Week 7: at Kansas City Chiefs ====
Week 7: San Diego Chargers at Kansas City Chiefs

Quarter	1	2	3	4	Total
Chargers	0	6	7	14	27
Chiefs	14	6	7	3	30

at Arrowhead Stadium, Kansas City, Missouri

- Date: October 22
- Game time: 12:00 p.m. CDT
- Game weather: 40 °F (4 °C), relative humidity 68%, wind 9 mph
- Game attendance: 77,752
- Referee: Bill Leavy
- TV announcers (CBS): Kevin Harlan and Rich Gannon
- Box score

Game information

First quarter

- KC – Kris Wilson 11-yard pass from Damon Huard (Lawrence Tynes kick), 6:21. Chiefs 7–0. Drive: 1 play, 11 yards, 0:04.
- KC – Eddie Kennison 21-yard pass from Damon Huard (Lawrence Tynes kick), 3:17. Chiefs 14–0. Drive: 3 plays, 32 yards, 0:51.

Second quarter

- SDG – Nate Kaeding 39-yard field goal, 14:52. Chiefs 14–3. Drive: 8 plays, 44 yards, 3:25.
- KC – Larry Johnson 11-yard run (kick failed), 11:06. Chiefs 20–3. Drive: 6 plays, 73 yards, 3:46.
- SDG – Nate Kaeding 31-yard field goal, 4:22. Chiefs 20–6. Drive: 12 plays, 67 yards, 6:44.

Third quarter

- SDG – Antonio Gates 1-yard pass from Philip Rivers (Nate Kaeding kick), 9:29. Chiefs 20–13. Drive: 7 plays, 30 yards, 3:42.
- KC – Larry Johnson 1-yard run (Lawrence Tynes kick), 1:32. Chiefs 27–13. Drive: 14 plays, 89 yards, 7:57.

Fourth quarter

- SDG – LaDainian Tomlinson 37-yard pass from Philip Rivers (Nate Kaeding kick), 13:16. Chiefs 27–20. Drive: 7 plays, 66 yards, 3:16.
- SDG – Brandon Manumaleuna 1-yard pass from LaDainian Tomlinson (Nate Kaeding kick), 5:10. Tied 27–27. Drive: 5 plays, 23 yards, 2:26.
- KC – Lawrence Tynes 53-yard field goal, 0:06. Chiefs 30–27. Drive: 4 plays, 47 yards, 0:27.

Top passers

- SDG – Philip Rivers – 25/43, 266 yards, 2 TD, INT
- KC – Damon Huard – 15/27, 232 yards, 2 TD

Top rushers

- SDG – LaDainian Tomlinson – 15 rushes, 66 yards
- KC – Larry Johnson – 28 rushes, 132 yards, 2 TD

Top receivers

- SDG – LaDainian Tomlinson – 6 receptions, 72 yards, TD
- KC – Tony Gonzalez – 6 receptions, 132 yards

The Chargers flew to Arrowhead Stadium for a Week 7 fight with their AFC West rival, the Kansas City Chiefs. In the first quarter, San Diego fell behind early with KC QB Damon Huard completing an 11-yard TD pass to TE Kris Wilson and a 21-yard TD pass to WR Eddie Kennison. In the second quarter, the Chargers got on the board with kicker Nate Kaeding making a 39-yard field goal, yet Kansas City would respond with an 11-yard run by RB Larry Johnson. Kaeding made a 31-yard field goal for San Diego to end the half. In the third quarter, both teams swapped touchdowns, as QB Philip Rivers threw a 1-yard TD pass to TE Antonio Gates, while Johnson got a 1-yard TD run. In the fourth quarter, RB LaDainian Tomlinson caught a 37-yard TD pass and then threw a 1-yard TD pass to TE Brandon Manumaleuna. Kansas City Chiefs kicker Lawrence Tynes was good on a 53-yard field goal to seal the win for Kansas City, dropping San Diego to 4–2.

==== Week 8: vs. St. Louis Rams ====
Week 8: St. Louis Rams at San Diego Chargers

Quarter	1	2	3	4	Total
Rams	0	7	3	14	24
Chargers	14	0	10	14	38

at Qualcomm Stadium, San Diego, California

- Date: October 29
- Game time: 1:05 p.m. PST
- Game weather: 72 °F (22 °C), relative humidity 19%, wind 6 mph
- Game attendance: 66,598
- Referee: Walt Coleman
- TV announcers (FOX): Kenny Albert, Daryl Johnston and Tony Siragusa
- Box score

Game information

First quarter

- SDG – LaDainian Tomlinson 2-yard run (Nate Kaeding kick), 7:05. Chargers 7–0. Drive: 12 plays, 80 yards, 7:55.
- SDG – LaDainian Tomlinson 38-yard run (Nate Kaeding kick), 3:33. Chargers 14–0. Drive: 3 plays, 56 yards, 1:37.

Second quarter

- STL – Steven Jackson 3-yard run (Jeff Wilkins kick), 12:26. Chargers 14–7. Drive: 11 plays, 74 yards, 6:07.

Third quarter

- SDG – Marlon McCree 79-yard defensive fumble return (Nate Kaeding kick), 8:56. Chargers 21–7.
- STL – Jeff Wilkins 34-yard field goal, 7:18. Chargers 21–10. Drive: 6 plays, 68 yards, 1:38.
- SDG – Nate Kaeding 31-yard field goal, 3:17. Chargers 24–10. Drive: 8 plays, 70 yards, 4:01.

Fourth quarter

- SDG – Michael Turner 14-yard run (Nate Kaeding kick), 11:44. Chargers 31–10. Drive: 8 plays, 84 yards, 4:12.
- STL – Shaun McDonald 7-yard pass from Marc Bulger (Jeff Wilkins kick), 6:39. Chargers 31–17. Drive: 11 plays, 80 yards, 5:05.
- SDG – LaDainian Tomlinson 25-yard pass from Philip Rivers (Nate Kaeding kick), 3:58. Chargers 38–17. Drive: 5 plays, 42 yards, 2:41.
- STL – Kevin Curtis 6-yard pass from Marc Bulger (Jeff Wilkins kick), 1:31. Chargers 38–24. Drive: 9 plays, 75 yards, 2:27.

Top passers

- STL – Marc Bulger – 27/40, 327 yards, 2 TD
- SDG – Philip Rivers – 15/23, 206 yards, TD

Top rushers

- STL – Willie Parker – 18 rushes, 84 yards, TD
- SDG – LaDainian Tomlinson – 25 rushes, 183 yards, 2 TD

Top receivers

- STL – Isaac Bruce – 5 receptions, 105 yards
- SDG – Antonio Gates – 5 receptions, 66 yards

The Chargers returned home for a Week 8 fight with the St. Louis Rams. In the first quarter, RB LaDainian Tomlinson completed a 2-yard TD run and a 38-yard TD run. In the second quarter, the Rams climbed into the contest with RB Steven Jackson completing a 3-yard TD run for the Rams' only score of the period. In the third quarter, San Diego gained some distance in their lead, as free safety Marlon McCree returned a fumble 79 yards for a touchdown. St. Louis got a field goal, as kicker Jeff Wilkins hit from 34 yards out. The Chargers also got a field goal, as kicker Nate Kaeding was good from 31 yards out. In the fourth quarter, San Diego RB Michael Turner scored on a 14-yard TD run, while Rams QB Marc Bulger completed a 7-yard TD pass to WR Shaun McDonald. The Chargers responded with QB Philip Rivers completing a 25-yard TD pass to Tomlinson, while Bulger completed a 6-yard TD pass to WR Kevin Curtis, in favor of St. Louis. In the end, the Chargers improved to 5–2.

==== Week 9: vs. Cleveland Browns ====
Week 9: Cleveland Browns at San Diego Chargers

Quarter	1	2	3	4	Total
Browns	3	9	0	13	25
Chargers	3	7	7	15	32

at Qualcomm Stadium, San Diego, California

- Date: November 5
- Game time: 1:15 p.m. PST
- Game weather: 87 °F (31 °C), relative humidity 9%, wind 3 mph
- Game attendance: 65,558
- Referee: Gene Steratore
- TV announcers (CBS): Gus Johnson and Steve Tasker
- Box score

Game information

First quarter

- SDG – Nate Kaeding 29-yard field goal, 7:47. Chargers 3–0. Drive: 12 plays, 69 yards, 7:13.
- CLE – Phil Dawson 37-yard field goal, 1:35. Tied 3–3. Drive: 9 plays, 56 yards, 6:12.

Second quarter

- CLE – Phil Dawson 20-yard field goal, 13:47. Browns 6–3. Drive: 4 plays, 7 yards, 1:36.
- SDG – Marques Harris fumble recovery in end zone (Nate Kaeding kick), 5:49. Chargers 10–6.
- CLE – Phil Dawson 42-yard field goal, 2:44. Chargers 10–9. Drive: 9 plays, 27 yards, 3:05.
- CLE – Phil Dawson 30-yard field goal, 0:01. Browns 12–10. Drive: 10 plays, 59 yards, 1:51.

Third quarter

- SDG – LaDainian Tomlinson 41-yard run (Nate Kaeding kick), 1:08. Chargers 17–12. Drive: 1 play, 41 yards, 0:09.

Fourth quarter

- CLE – Phil Dawson 36-yard field goal, 14:19. Chargers 17–15. Drive: 7 plays, 41 yards, 1:49.
- SDG – LaDainian Tomlinson 7-yard run (Nate Kaeding kick), 9:15. Chargers 24–15. Drive: 10 plays, 77 yards, 5:04.
- CLE – Phil Dawson 36-yard field goal, 5:29. Chargers 24–18. Drive: 13 plays, 57 yards, 3:46.
- SDG – LaDainian Tomlinson 8-yard run (Vincent Jackson pass from Philip Rivers), 3:53. Chargers 32–18. Drive: 5 plays, 86 yards, 1:36.
- CLE – Braylon Edwards 4-yard pass from Charlie Frye (Phil Dawson kick), 1:11. Chargers 32–25. Drive: 11 plays, 69 yards, 2:42.

Top passers

- CLE – Charlie Frye – 26/44, 241 yards, TD, INT
- SDG – Philip Rivers – 19/28, 211 yards

Top rushers

- CLE – Reuben Droughns – 19 rushes, 36 yards
- SDG – LaDainian Tomlinson – 18 rushes, 172 yards, 3 TD

Top receivers

- CLE – Kellen Winslow – 11 receptions, 78 yards
- SDG – Eric Parker – 5 receptions, 65 yards

The Chargers at home, donned their throwback jerseys and played a Week 9 fight against the Cleveland Browns. In the first quarter, both sides would limit each other to a field goal. Chargers kicker Nate Kaeding would complete a 29-yard field goal, while Browns kicker Phil Dawson completed a 37-yard field goal. In the second quarter, Dawson would help Cleveland take the lead on a 20-yard field goal. San Diego a defensive touchdown as back as LB Marques Harris recovered a fumble in the Browns end zone. The Brown's would retake the lead with Dawson nailing a 42-yard and a 30-yard field goal. In the third quarter, the Chargers RB LaDainian Tomlinson got a 41-yard TD run for the only score of the period. In the fourth quarter, Dawson helped the Browns by converting a 36-yard field goal, San Diego continued to add to their total with Tomlinson getting a 7-yard TD run. Dawson would get one more field goal (from 35 yards out), the Chargers continued to score touchdowns as Tomlinson ran one in from 8-yard out. QB Philip Rivers completed a 2-point conversion pass to WR Vincent Jackson. Afterwards, Cleveland would get its only touchdown of the game, as QB Charlie Frye hooked up with WR Braylon Edwards on a 4-yard pass. In the end, San Diego came out on top and improved to 6–2.

==== Week 10: at Cincinnati Bengals ====
Week 10: San Diego Chargers at Cincinnati Bengals

Quarter	1	2	3	4	Total
Chargers	0	7	21	21	49
Bengals	21	7	10	3	41

at Paul Brown Stadium, Cincinnati, Ohio

- Date: November 12
- Game time: 1:03 p.m. EST
- Game weather: 42 °F (6 °C), relative humidity 66%, wind 9 mph
- Game attendance: 65,917
- Referee: Scott Green
- TV announcers (CBS): Greg Gumbel and Dan Dierdorf
- Box score

Game information

First quarter

- CIN – Jeremi Johnson 3-yard run (Shayne Graham kick), 9:57. Bengals 7–0. Drive: 6 plays, 62 yards, 3:10.
- CIN – Rudi Johnson 7-yard run (Shayne Graham kick), 1:36. Bengals 14–0. Drive: 10 plays, 89 yards, 4:27.
- CIN – Chad Johnson 51-yard pass from Carson Palmer (Shayne Graham kick), 0:09. Bengals 21–0. Drive: 1 play, 51 yards, 0:08.

Second quarter

- SDG – LaDainian Tomlinson 9-yard run (Nate Kaeding kick), 5:27. Bengals 21–7. Drive: 6 plays, 59 yards, 2:36.
- CIN – Chris Henry 7-yard pass from Carson Palmer (Shayne Graham kick), 0:16. Bengals 28–7. Drive: 14 plays, 74 yards, 5:11.

Third quarter

- SDG – LaDainian Tomlinson 4-yard run (Nate Kaeding kick), 10:47. Bengals 28–14. Drive: 6 plays, 69 yards, 2:28.
- SDG – Malcom Floyd 46-yard pass from Philip Rivers (Nate Kaeding kick), 9:08. Bengals 28–21. Drive: 1 play, 46 yards, 0:07.
- CIN – Shayne Graham 21-yard field goal, 6:27. Bengals 31–21. Drive: 6 plays, 54 yards, 2:41.
- SDG – Brandon Manumaleuna 9-yard pass from Philip Rivers (Nate Kaeding kick), 3:08. Bengals 31–28. Drive: 9 plays, 80 yards, 3:19.
- CIN – Chad Johnson 74-yard pass from Carson Palmer (Shayne Graham kick), 2:50. Bengals 38–28. Drive: 1 play, 74 yards, 0:08.

Fourth quarter

- SDG – LaDainian Tomlinson 2-yard run (Nate Kaeding kick), 14:55. Bengals 38–35. Drive: 7 plays, 40 yards, 2:55.
- SDG – LaDainian Tomlinson 9-yard run (Nate Kaeding kick), 14:40. Chargers 42–38. Drive: 1 play, 9 yards, 0:06.
- CIN – Shayne Graham 44-yard field goal, 7:48. Chargers 42–41. Drive: 4 plays, 19 yards, 1:49.
- SDG – Brandon Manumaleuna 5-yard pass from Philip Rivers (Nate Kaeding kick), 2:29. Chargers 49–41. Drive: 12 plays, 72 yards, 5:19.

Top passers

- SDG – Philip Rivers – 24/36, 338 yards, 3 TD
- CIN – Carson Palmer – 31/42, 440 yards, 3 TD

Top rushers

- SDG – LaDainian Tomlinson – 22 rushes, 104 yards, 4 TD
- CIN – Rudi Johnson – 18 rushes, 85 yards, TD

Top receivers

- SDG – Malcom Floyd – 5 receptions, 109 yards, TD
- CIN – Chad Johnson – 11 receptions, 260 yards, 2 TD

In a high scoring contest the San Diego Chargers overcame two 21-point deficits to take down the Cincinnati Bengals on the road. The game started off with Carson Palmer completing 7 of his first 10 passes and with two short runs by Jeremi Johnson and Rudi Johnson plus a long pass to Chad Johnson of 51 yards the Bengals were dominating the Chargers going up 21–0 after the first quarter. The Chargers were able to get things working a little bit in the second quarter with LaDainian Tomlinson running a TD in from 9-yds out to shrink the deficit to 21–7, but a 7-yd pass to Chris Henry finished the first half with the Bengals up 28–7. The Chargers came out for the third quarter and rebounded with a 4-yd run by LT and a 46-yd pass from Philip Rivers to WR Malcom Floyd to make it a 28–21 game. Cincinnati responded by driving down field again; however, this time they had to settle for a field goal to make the score 31–21. Philip Rivers lead the Chargers down field with a 9-play 80-yd drive capped off with a 9-yd strike to TE Brandon Manumaleuna to get within 3 making it 31–28. But the Chargers defense lapsed again with no one covering Johnson when Palmer passed him the ball for a 74-yd reception to make it 38–28. The Chargers drove down field again and ended the third quarter in position to shrink the lead allowing the team to start off the final quarter of play with a 2-yd run to make the score 38–35. Then after the kickoff Chargers Linebacker Shaun Phillips sacked Carson Palmer on first down forcing a fumble that was recovered by the Chargers. A 9-yd run by LaDainian Tomlinson gave the Chargers their first lead by the score of 42–38. The Bengals came within one with a 44-yd kick making it 42–41, but the Bolts were not to be denied as Rivers led yet another drive down field ending with a shovel pass to Manumaleuna who wasn't covered to make the score 49–41 and the Chargers officially tied their biggest comeback in team history with LaDainian Tomlinson getting 108-yds rushing and 4 rushing TDs and Philip Rivers passing for 24 of 36 and 337 yds with three touchdowns.

With the win, the Chargers improved to 7–2.

==== Week 11: at Denver Broncos ====
Week 11: San Diego Chargers at Denver Broncos

Quarter	1	2	3	4	Total
Chargers	7	0	14	14	35
Broncos	0	14	10	3	27

at Invesco Field at Mile High, Denver, Colorado

- Date: November 19
- Game time: 6:21 p.m. MST
- Game weather: 34 °F (1 °C), relative humidity 44%, wind 8 mph, wind chill 27
- Game attendance: 76,723
- Referee: Bill Carollo
- TV announcers (NBC): Al Michaels, John Madden and Andrea Kremer
- Box score

Game information

First quarter

- SDG – LaDainian Tomlinson 3-yard run (Nate Kaeding kick), 0:08. Chargers 7–0. Drive: 11 plays, 99 yards, 6:19.

Second quarter

- DEN – Mike Bell 3-yard run (Jason Elam kick), 8:17. Tied 7–7. Drive: 13 plays, 88 yards, 6:51.
- DEN – Mike Bell 3-yard run (Jason Elam kick), 0:34. Broncos 14–7. Drive: 8 plays, 86 yards, 3:42.

Third quarter

- DEN – Jason Elam 42-yard field goal, 10:48. Broncos 17–7. Drive: 7 plays, 23 yards, 4:12.
- DEN – Darrent Williams 31-yard interception return (Jason Elam kick), 9:25. Broncos 24–7.
- SDG – LaDainian Tomlinson 3-yard run (Nate Kaeding kick), 5:10. Broncos 24–14. Drive: 7 plays, 60 yards, 4:15.
- SDG – LaDainian Tomlinson 51-yard pass from Philip Rivers (Nate Kaeding kick), 3:51. Broncos 24–21. Drive: 3 plays, 58 yards, 0:50.

Fourth quarter

- DEN – Jason Elam 42-yard field goal, 11:13. Broncos 27–21. Drive: 14 plays, 60 yards, 7:38.
- SDG – Vincent Jackson 5-yard pass from Philip Rivers (Nate Kaeding kick), 6:45. Chargers 28–27. Drive: 7 plays, 55 yards, 4:28.
- SDG – LaDainian Tomlinson 1-yard run (Nate Kaeding kick), 1:14. Chargers 35–27. Drive: 5 plays, 23 yards, 1:49.

Top passers

- SDG – Philip Rivers – 19/26, 222 yards, 2 TD, 2 INT
- DEN – Jake Plummer – 13/28, 183 yards, INT

Top rushers

- SDG – LaDainian Tomlinson – 20 rushes, 105 yards, 3 TD
- DEN – Mike Bell – 20 rushes, 90 yards, 2 TD

Top receivers

- SDG – LaDainian Tomlinson – 3 receptions, 74 yards, TD
- DEN – Javon Walker – 4 receptions, 68 yards

LaDainian Tomlinson made history by becoming the fastest running back to reach 100 career TDs by doing it in 89 games, eclipsing the mark set by Emmitt Smith and Jim Brown of 93 games. He also continued his march toward beating Shaun Alexander's single-season TD record by scoring 4 TDs to bring his total to 22, just 5 short of tying Alexander's mark. Philip Rivers had a good day as well, throwing 19 of 26 for 222 yards and two TDs, although he did throw two picks including a 31-yard interception return for a TD by Denver cornerback Darrent Williams. The game started out with Tomlinson running it in from 3 yards out to make it 7–0 San Diego. Denver's Mike Bell ran for two TDs in during the 2nd quarter to make it a 14–7 Denver lead at halftime. After the break, Denver continued the scoring with a Jason Elam's 42-yd field goal and Williams INT return to make it a 24–7 lead for Denver. But just like last week against the Bengals, the Chargers wouldn't say die putting together two scoring drives including a 3-yard run by LT, his 100th TD, and a 51-yd pass to LT by Rivers to cut the lead to 24–21 at the end of the third quarter. Elam helped the Broncos' cause by hitting a 38-yd kick to extend the Broncos' lead to 27–21, but that only lasted until Rivers found Vincent Jackson open at the back of the end zone to put the Chargers up 28–27. On the ensuing Broncos drive, Drayton Florence then intercepted Jake Plummer's 4th and 4 pass to give the Bolts terrific field position that set up a 1-yard run by LT to make it 35–27; it was his 4th TD of the night and 102nd of his career. That left Denver 1:14 to try to tie the game. They started that drive from their 3 and made it all the way to the Chargers 32 in part to a personal foul on Chargers defensive end Igor Olshansky, who was ejected for punching Broncos center Tom Nalen. The Broncos' hopes for overtime ended when Plummer was sacked by Shaun Phillips and time ran out, giving San Diego their first win in Denver in 7 years as well as sole position of first place in the AFC West and improved their record to 8–2.

==== Week 12: vs. Oakland Raiders ====
Week 12: Oakland Raiders at San Diego Chargers

Quarter	1	2	3	4	Total
Raiders	0	7	7	0	14
Chargers	0	7	0	14	21

at Qualcomm Stadium, San Diego, California

- Date: November 26
- Game time: 1:05 p.m. PST
- Game weather: 64 °F (18 °C), relative humidity 59%, wind 8 mph
- Game attendance: 66,105
- Referee: Mike Carey
- TV announcers (CBS): Dick Enberg and Randy Cross
- Box score

Game information

First quarter

- No scoring plays.

Second quarter

- OAK – ReShard Lee 1-yard run (Sebastian Janikowski kick), 14:14. Raiders 7–0. Drive: 8 plays, 70 yards, 3:19.
- SDG – LaDainian Tomlinson 4-yard run (Nate Kaeding kick), 13:27. Tied 7–7. Drive: 2 plays, 12 yards, 0:47.

Third quarter

- OAK – John Madsen 2-yard pass from Aaron Brooks (Sebastian Janikowski kick), 7:40. Raiders 14–7. Drive: 4 plays, 67 yards, 1:39.

Fourth quarter

- SDG – Antonio Gates 19-yard pass from LaDainian Tomlinson (Nate Kaeding kick), 9:46. Tied 14–14. Drive: 8 plays, 48 yards, 3:40.
- SDG – LaDainian Tomlinson 10-yard run (Nate Kaeding kick), 3:39. Chargers 21–14. Drive: 6 plays, 67 yards, 3:15.

Top passers

- OAK – Aaron Brooks – 17/30, 187 yards, TD, 2 INT
- SDG – Philip Rivers – 14/31, 133 yards, INT

Top rushers

- OAK – Justin Fargas – 14 rushes, 32 yards
- SDG – LaDainian Tomlinson – 19 rushes, 109 yards, 2 TD

Top receivers

- OAK – John Madsen – 3 receptions, 69 yards, TD
- SDG – Antonio Gates – 6 receptions, 81 yards, TD

LaDainian Tomlinson ran in two TDs and threw for one to give San Diego its third straight comeback win. He then had 21 rushing touchdowns on the year and brought his career QB record to 7 completions out of 10 attempts with 6 touchdowns. Philip Rivers, on the other hand, struggled completing 14 of 31 passes and throwing for only a 133 yards with no touchdowns and 1 interception. The Chargers swept the Raiders and had then won seven straight from Oakland. The scoring started with the Raiders making it 7–0 after a 1-yard pass from Aaron Brooks to Reshard Lee. The Chargers answered back when Antonio Cromartie returned the ensuing kick 91 yards, which set up a 2-yard run by LT to tie the score at 7–7 going into the half. The Raiders took the lead again on a catch and run by rookie John Madsen that set up a 2-yard pass from Brooks to Madsen to make it 14–7 Oakland. On 4th and 2, Rivers passed to Vincent Jackson for a first down, but Jackson proceeded to get up and throw the ball forward in celebration, but he hadn't been touched down. The initial ruling was that it was a fumble and Oakland's ball; however, after the officials got together for a conference they declared that since it was an illegal forward fumble that it was technically an illegal forward pass and San Diego was then given back the ball and penalized 5 yards, which was still enough for the first down. The game continued and on the next play, Rivers pitched the ball to Tomlinson as if it were a run play but then threw the ball to an open Antonio Gates to tie the score at 14–14. After forcing Oakland to punt, the Chargers drove down field and LT ran it in from 10 yards out to give the Chargers the 21–14 win.

With the win, the Chargers had won 7 straight games over the Raiders and improved their record to 9–2.

==== Week 13: at Buffalo Bills ====
Week 13: San Diego Chargers at Buffalo Bills

Quarter	1	2	3	4	Total
Chargers	10	7	0	7	24
Bills	0	0	14	7	21

at Ralph Wilson Stadium, Buffalo, New York

- Date: December 3
- Game time: 1:02 p.m. EST
- Game weather: 35 °F (2 °C), relative humidity 66%, wind 11 mph
- Game attendance: 63,361
- Referee: Ed Hochuli
- TV announcers (CBS): Gus Johnson and Steve Tasker
- Box score

Game information

First quarter

- SDG – Nate Kaeding 42-yard field goal, 9:12. Chargers 3–0. Drive: 8 plays, 34 yards, 3:52.
- SDG – LaDainian Tomlinson 51-yard run (Nate Kaeding kick), 1:06. Chargers 10–0. Drive: 2 plays, 59 yards, 0:34.

Second quarter

- SDG – Antonio Gates 11-yard pass from Philip Rivers (Nate Kaeding kick), 0:24. Chargers 17–0. Drive: 5 plays, 43 yards, 0:30.

Third quarter

- BUF – Robert Royal 5-yard pass from J. P. Losman (Rian Lindell kick), 11:33. Chargers 17–7. Drive: 4 plays, 19 yards, 2:00.
- BUF – Willis McGahee 2 yard run (Rian Lindell kick), 8:09. Chargers 17–14. Drive: 4 plays, 13 yards, 1:55.

Fourth quarter

- SDG – LaDainian Tomlinson 2-yard run (Nate Kaeding kick), 3:26. Chargers 24–14. Drive: 13 plays, 80 yards, 8:06.
- BUF – Peerless Price 6-yard pass from J. P. Losman (Rian Lindell kick), 0:30. Chargers 24–21. Drive: 10 plays, 62 yards, 1:56.

Top passers

- SDG – Philip Rivers – 17/29, 160 yards, TD
- BUF – J. P. Losman – 21/37, 184 yards, 2 TD, 2 INT

Top rushers

- SDG – LaDainian Tomlinson – 28 rushes, 178 yards, 2 TD
- BUF – J.P. Losman – 6 rushes, 26 yards
  BUF – Willis McGahee – 16 rushes, 26 yards, TD

Top receivers

- SDG – Antonio Gates – 7 receptions, 90 yards, TD
- BUF – Josh Reed – 4 receptions, 50 yards

Coming off a season-sweep over the Raiders, the Chargers flew to Ralph Wilson Stadium for a cold Week 13 fight against the throwback-clad Buffalo Bills. This game would also mark the return of San Diego's star linebacker Shawne Merriman after his four-game suspension for failing a test for performance-enhancing drugs. In the first quarter, the Chargers drew first blood with kicker Nate Kaeding's 42-yard field goal and RB LaDainian Tomlinson's 51-yard TD run. In the second quarter, San Diego got the only score of the period with QB Philip Rivers completing an 11-yard TD pass to TE Antonio Gates. In the third quarter, the Bills started to come back with QB J. P. Losman completing a 5-yard TD pass to TE Robert Royal, while RB Willis McGahee got a 2-yard TD run. In the fourth quarter, the Chargers distanced themselves from Buffalo with Tomlinson's 2-yard TD run. The Bills would get another touchdown, with Losman completing a 6-yard pass to WR Peerless Price. San Diego would emerge as the victor. With their sixth-straight win, the Chargers improved to 10–2.

==== Week 14: vs. Denver Broncos ====
Week 14: Denver Broncos at San Diego Chargers

Quarter	1	2	3	4	Total
Broncos	0	3	17	0	20
Chargers	14	14	0	20	48

at Qualcomm Stadium, San Diego, California

- Date: December 10
- Game time: 1:15 p.m. PST
- Game weather: 57 °F (14 °C), relative humidity 61%, wind 13 mph
- Game attendance: 67,514
- Referee: Peter Morelli
- TV announcers (CBS): Jim Nantz and Phil Simms
- Box score

Game information

First quarter

- SDG – Antonio Gates 12-yard pass from Philip Rivers (Nate Kaeding kick), 4:50. Chargers 7–0. Drive: 4 plays, 44 yards, 2:17.
- SDG – Lorenzo Neal 4-yard run (Nate Kaeding kick), 0:05. Chargers 14–0. Drive: 6 plays, 54 yards, 2:57.

Second quarter

- DEN – Jason Elam 34-yard field goal, 12:49. Chargers 14–3. Drive: 5 plays, 59 yards, 2:16.
- SDG – LaDainian Tomlinson 1-yard run (Nate Kaeding kick), 10:15. Chargers 21–3. Drive: 5 plays, 53 yards, 2:34.
- SDG – Antonio Gates 7-yard pass from Philip Rivers (Nate Kaeding kick), 0:23. Chargers 28–3. Drive: 13 plays, 80 yards, 6:19.

Third quarter

- DEN – Tony Scheffler 28-yard pass from Jay Cutler (Jason Elam kick), 10:35. Chargers 28–10. Drive: 7 plays, 71 yards, 3:26.
- DEN – Tony Scheffler 11-yard pass from Jay Cutler (Jason Elam kick), 9:47. Chargers 28–17. Drive: 3 plays, 27 yards, 0:40.
- DEN – Jason Elam 33-yard field goal, 1:02. Chargers 28–20. Drive: 10 plays, 78 yards, 5:08.

Fourth quarter

- SDG – Nate Kaeding 34-yard field goal, 12:52. Chargers 31–20. Drive: 7 plays, 64 yards, 3:10.
- SDG – Nate Kaeding 35-yard field goal, 8:15. Chargers 34–20. Drive: 7 plays, 29 yards, 2:43.
- SDG – LaDainian Tomlinson 6-yard run (Nate Kaeding kick), 3:57. Chargers 41–20. Drive: 5 plays, 20 yards, 2:54.
- SDG – LaDainian Tomlinson 7-yard run (Nate Kaeding kick), 3:10. Chargers 48–20. Drive: 1 play, 7 yards, 0:05.

Top passers

- DEN – Jay Cutler – 17/30, 188 yards, 2 TD
- SDG – Philip Rivers – 15/23, 279 yards, 2 TD

Top rushers

- DEN – Tatum Bell – 17 rushes, 116 yards
- SDG – LaDainian Tomlinson – 28 rushes, 103 yards, 3 TD

Top receivers

- DEN – Tony Scheffler – 3 receptions, 66 yards, 2 TD
- SDG – Antonio Gates – 7 receptions, 104 yards, 2 TD

The game featured newly appointed rookie Denver QB Jay Cutler. In a stark contrast to the come-from-behind victory against Denver earlier in the season, San Diego scored early and often in this game, leading the game 28–3 at halftime. It was all Denver in the 3rd quarter, the Broncos closing the gap to 28–20, but San Diego bounced back in the fourth quarter with 20 unanswered points, winning the game 48–20. The win, as well as a Kansas City Chiefs loss earlier in the day, clinched the AFC West Division for San Diego. With the Indianapolis Colts also losing earlier in the day, San Diego gained the best record in the AFC (11–2). In addition, with his 7-yard rushing touchdown toward the end of the 4th quarter (his third of the game), RB LaDainian Tomlinson broke the NFL single-season touchdown record (29) (26 Rushing, 3 receiving), set by the Seattle Seahawks' RB Shaun Alexander (28) in the previous season.

==== Week 15: vs. Kansas City Chiefs ====
Week 15: Kansas City Chiefs at San Diego Chargers

Quarter	1	2	3	4	Total
Chiefs	3	0	3	3	9
Chargers	7	7	0	6	20

at Qualcomm Stadium, San Diego, California

- Date: December 17
- Game time: 5:15 p.m. PST
- Game weather: 57 °F (14 °C), relative humidity 48%, wind 12 mph
- Game attendance: 66,583
- Referee: Jeff Triplette
- TV announcers (NBC): Al Michaels, John Madden and Andrea Kremer
- Box score

Game information

First quarter

- SDG – LaDainian Tomlinson 15-yard run (Nate Kaeding kick), 9:15. Chargers 7–0. Drive: 8 plays, 74 yards, 3:42.

Second quarter

- KC – Lawrence Tynes 45-yard field goal, 13:01. Chargers 7–3. Drive: 4 plays, 9 yards, 1:44.
- SDG – LaDainian Tomlinson 85-yard run (Nate Kaeding kick), 2:41. Chargers 14–3. Drive: 1 play, 85 yards, 0:12.

Third quarter

- KC – Lawrence Tynes 52-yard field goal, 2:22. Chargers 14–6. Drive: 11 plays, 50 yards, 5:48.

Fourth quarter

- SDG – Nate Kaeding 30-yard field goal, 12:18. Chargers 17–6. Drive: 9 plays, 31 yards, 5:04.
- KC – Lawrence Tynes 24-yard field goal, 7:01. Chiefs 17–9. Drive: 7 plays, 33 yards, 3:07.
- SDG – Nate Kaeding 22-yard field goal, 4:40. Chiefs 20–9. Drive: 7 plays, 65 yards, 2:21.

Top passers

- KC – Trent Green – 23/41, 185 yards, INT
- SDG – Philip Rivers – 8/23, 97 yards, 2 INT

Top rushers

- KC – Larry Johnson – 19 rushes, 84 yards
- SDG – LaDainian Tomlinson – 25 rushes, 199 yards, 2 TD

Top receivers

- KC – Tony Gonzalez – 6 receptions, 53 yards
- SDG – Vincent Jackson – 3 receptions, 66 yards

After a 3-point loss earlier in the year, the Chargers were set to split the season series with the Kansas City Chiefs. Kansas City meanwhile was reeling from a loss against Baltimore, and the death of the team's owner, Lamar Hunt. In this game the Chargers were again led to victory by LaDainian Tomlinson who scored twice, breaking the NFL single-season scoring record held by Paul Hornung for the last 46 years. The latter was an 85-yard touchdown rush which is the longest of his career. He also broke Shaun Alexander and Priest Holmes's shared Single Season Rushing TD record by getting 28 rushing touchdowns and added to the record he set last week for total touchdowns with 31 (28 rushing, 3 receiving). Moreover, he set the record for most consecutive Multi-Touchdown Games with 8.

With the win, the Chargers improved to 12–2.

==== Week 16: at Seattle Seahawks ====
Week 16: San Diego Chargers at Seattle Seahawks

Quarter	1	2	3	4	Total
Chargers	0	7	6	7	20
Seahawks	0	0	7	10	17

at Qwest Field, Seattle, Washington

- Date: December 24
- Game time: 1:16 p.m. PST
- Game weather: 47 °F (8 °C), relative humidity 55%, wind 18 mph
- Game attendance: 68,174
- Referee: Ron Winter
- TV announcers (CBS): Dick Enberg and Randy Cross
- Box score

Game information

First quarter

- No scoring plays.

Second quarter

- SDG – Vincent Jackson 9-yard pass from Philip Rivers (Nate Kaeding kick), 3:18. Chargers 7–0. Drive: 6 plays, 86 yards, 2:56.

Third quarter

- SDG – Nate Kaeding 46-yard field goal, 12:12. Chargers 10–0. Drive: 8 plays, 45 yards, 2:48.
- SEA – Shaun Alexander 33-yard run (Josh Brown kick), 6:10. Chargers 10–7. Drive: 6 plays, 52 yards, 1:56.
- SDG – Nate Kaeding 40-yard field goal, 2:24. Chargers 13–7. Drive: 9 plays, 61 yards, 3:46.

Fourth quarter

- SEA – Shaun Alexander 9-yard run (Josh Brown kick), 12:58. Seahawks 14–13. Drive: 5 plays, 45 yards, 1:55.
- SEA – Josh Brown 33-yard field goal, 5:07. Seahawks 17–13. Drive: 12 plays, 47 yards, 6:09.
- SDG – Vincent Jackson 37-yard pass from Philip Rivers (Nate Kaeding kick), 0:29. Chargers 20–17. Drive: 5 plays, 59 yards, 1:31.

Top passers

- SDG – Philip Rivers – 10/30, 181 yards, 2 TD
- SEA – Matt Hasselbeck – 17/37, 189 yards, 2 INT

Top rushers

- SDG – LaDainian Tomlinson – 22 rushes, 123 yards
- SEA – Shaun Alexander – 31 rushes, 140 yards, 2 TD

Top receivers

- SDG – Vincent Jackson – 5 receptions, 97 yards, 2 TD
- SEA – Bobby Engram – 4 receptions, 65 yards

San Diego took the lead late in the second quarter when Philip Rivers threw a TD to WR Vincent Jackson, giving San Diego a 7–0 lead going into halftime. Rivers had a bad first half completing only 1 of 10 passes, the only completion being a touchdown. The 3rd quarter saw San Diego add to their lead making it 10–0. But Seattle RB Shaun Alexander narrowed the gap with a rushing TD making it 10–7, San Diego would answer back with a field goal to make it 13–7, but on Seattle's ensuing drive they allowed another Alexander TD to make the score 14–13 and they would allow a field goal to give Seattle a 17–13 lead. With time running out San Diego drove down the field and Rivers would connect with a 37-yd pass to Jackson to give the Chargers a 20–17 lead with only :29 seconds remaining. The defense would hold and the Chargers continued their winning ways setting a team record 13th win. The win also clinched a first round bye and set up the Chargers to control their own destiny the next week against Arizona, as a win would clinch them homefield advantage throughout the playoffs.

With the win, the Chargers improved to 13–2.

==== Week 17: vs. Arizona Cardinals ====
Week 17: Arizona Cardinals at San Diego Chargers

Quarter	1	2	3	4	Total
Cardinals	7	0	3	10	20
Chargers	3	14	10	0	27

at Qualcomm Stadium, San Diego, California

- Date: December 31
- Game time: 1:15 p.m. PST
- Game weather: 57 °F (14 °C), relative humidity 59%, wind 4 mph
- Game attendance: 66,492
- Referee: Gerry Austin
- TV announcers (Fox): Matt Devlin, Dale Hellestrae, Chris Rix
- Box score

Game information

First quarter

- ARI – Edgerrin James 8-yard run (Neil Rackers kick), 6:21. Cardinals 7–0. Drive: 9 plays, 78 yards, 3:59.
- SDG – Nate Kaeding 47-yard field goal, 2:23. Cardinals 7–3. Drive: 8 plays, 36 yards, 3:58.

Second quarter

- SDG – Antonio Gates 33-yard pass from Philip Rivers (Nate Kaeding kick), 10:25. Chargers 10–7. Drive: 10 plays, 76 yards, 4:57.
- SDG – Vincent Jackson 14-yard pass from Philip Rivers (Nate Kaeding kick), 1:49. Chargers 17–7. Drive: 10 plays, 79 yards, 5:09.

Third quarter

- SDG – Tim Dobbins fumble recovery in end zone (Nate Kaeding kick), 12:25. Chargers 24–7.
- SDG – Nate Kaeding 35-yard field goal, 6:23. Chargers 27–7. Drive: 8 plays, 45 yards, 4:25.
- ARI – Neil Rackers 28-yard field goal, 1:31. Chargers 27–10. Drive: 9 plays, 73 yards, 4:52.

Fourth quarter

- ARI – Larry Fitzgerald 9-yard pass from Kurt Warner (Neil Rackers kick), 9:06. Chargers 27–17. Drive: 7 plays, 86 yards, 3:41.
- ARI – Neil Rackers 20-yard field goal, 3:23. Chargers 27–20. Drive: 9 plays, 84 yards, 4:02.

Top passers

- ARI – Kurt Warner – 22/32, 356 yards, TD
- SDG – Philip Rivers – 19/24, 231 yards, 2 TD, INT

Top rushers

- ARI – Edgerrin James – 16 rushes, 66 yards, TD
- SDG – LaDainian Tomlinson – 16 rushes, 66 yards

Top receivers

- ARI – Anquan Boldin – 4 receptions, 112 yards
- SDG – Eric Parker – 5 receptions, 62 yards

With the San Diego Chargers on their way to owning the AFC's top seed in the playoffs, Rivers threw two touchdown passes after injuring his right foot, and LaDainian Tomlinson also limped off after wrapping up his first NFL rushing title in leading the Chargers to a 27–20 win over the Arizona Cardinals on Sunday. The Chargers clinched home-field advantage throughout the AFC playoffs. They'd already earned a first-round bye, which gave Rivers and Tomlinson time to heal. Their exact injuries weren't disclosed. Tomlinson ran for 66 yards, giving him 1,815 and the league rushing title. He beat Larry Johnson of the division rival Kansas City Chiefs, who had 1,789. Tomlinson did not score for the second straight game, but he already was the league's most prolific scorer in a single season, with 31 touchdowns and 186 points.

With the win, the Chargers finished the season at 14–2.

=== Standings ===
AFC West
	W	L	T	PCT	DIV	CONF	PF	PA	STK
^{(1)} San Diego Chargers	14	2	0	.875	5–1	10–2	492	303	W10
^{(6)} Kansas City Chiefs	9	7	0	.563	4–2	5–7	331	315	W2
Denver Broncos	9	7	0	.563	3–3	8–4	319	305	L1
Oakland Raiders	2	14	0	.125	0–6	1–11	168	332	L9

== Postseason ==
The Chargers had a first-round bye as a result of being the number one seed in the AFC.

=== Game summary ===
==== AFC Divisional Playoffs: vs. New England Patriots ====
AFC Divisional Playoffs: New England Patriots at San Diego Chargers

Quarter	1	2	3	4	Total
Patriots	3	7	3	11	24
Chargers	0	14	0	7	21

at Qualcomm Stadium, San Diego, California

- Date: January 14
- Game time: 1:40 p.m. PST
- Game weather: 53 °F (12 °C), relative humidity 20%, wind 6 mph
- Game attendance: 68,810
- Referee: Tony Corrente
- TV announcers (CBS): Jim Nantz and Phil Simms
- Box score

Game information

First quarter

- NE – Stephen Gostkowski 50-yard field goal, 0:40. Patriots 3–0. Drive: 9 plays, 33 yards, 4:35.

Second quarter

- SDG – LaDainian Tomlinson 2-yard run (Nate Kaeding kick), 7:19. Chargers 7–3. Drive: 9 plays, 48 yards, 4:31.
- SDG – Michael Turner 6-yard run (Nate Kaeding kick), 2:04. Chargers 14–3. Drive: 4 plays, 77 yards, 2:33.
- NE – Jabar Gaffney 6-yard pass from Tom Brady (Stephen Gostkowski kick), 0:08. Chargers 14–10. Drive: 11 plays, 72 yards, 1:56.

Third quarter

- NE – Stephen Gostkowski 34-yard field goal, 2:11. Chargers 14–13. Drive: 7 plays, 15 yards, 3:09.

Fourth quarter

- SDG – LaDainian Tomlinson 3-yard run (Nate Kaeding kick), 8:35. Chargers 21–13. Drive: 9 plays, 83 yards, 4:44.
- NE – Reche Caldwell 4-yard pass from Tom Brady (Kevin Faulk run), 4:36. Tied 21–21. Drive: 5 plays, 32 yards, 1:40.
- NE – Stephen Gostkowski 31-yard field goal, 1:10. Patriots 24–21. Drive: 8 plays, 72 yards, 2:20.

Top passers

- NE – Tom Brady – 27/51, 280 yards, 2 TD, 3 INT
- SDG – Philip Rivers – 14/32, 230 yards, INT

Top rushers

- NE – Kevin Faulk – 6 rushes, 25 yards
- SDG – LaDainian Tomlinson – 23 rushes, 123 yards, 2 TD

Top receivers

- NE – Jabar Gaffney – 10 receptions, 103 yards, TD
- SDG – LaDainian Tomlinson – 2 receptions, 64 yards

In the divisional playoffs, the New England Patriots faced a San Diego Chargers team who were unbeaten at home in the regular season. The Chargers boasted a roster that included eleven Pro Bowlers, six All-Pro players, and league MVP running back LaDainian Tomlinson, who had shattered several league records. However, four turnovers, three of which were converted into Patriots scoring drives, eventually led to the demise of the Chargers. San Diego ended up losing despite outgaining the Patriots in rushing yards, 148–51 and total yards, 352–327, while also intercepting three passes from Tom Brady.

In the first quarter, after San Diego coach Marty Schottenheimer opted to go for it on 4th-and-11 instead of attempting a 47-yard field goal, quarterback Philip Rivers lost a fumble while being sacked by Mike Vrabel, setting up Stephen Gostkowski's 51-yard field goal with 40 seconds left in the period. In the second quarter, Chargers receiver Eric Parker's 13-yard punt return set up a 48-yard scoring drive that ended with LaDainian Tomlinson's 2-yard touchdown run, giving his team a 7–3 lead. Then, on the Patriots' next drive, linebacker Donnie Edwards intercepted a pass from Brady and returned it to the 41-yard line. But the Chargers ended up punting after Rivers was sacked on third down by defensive back Artrell Hawkins. Later in the quarter, Tomlinson rushed twice for 13 yards and took a screen pass 58 yards to the Patriots' 6-yard line, setting up a 6-yard touchdown run by Michael Turner with 2:04 left in the half. New England responded with a 72-yard scoring drive, with receiver Jabar Gaffney catching four passes for 46 yards, including a 7-yard touchdown reception with six seconds left in the half, cutting their deficit to 14–10.

In the third quarter, Brady threw his second interception of the game. But once again, the Chargers were forced to punt after Rivers was sacked on third down. Mike Scifres' 36-yard punt pinned New England back at their own 2-yard line, and San Diego subsequently forced a punt, but Parker muffed the kick and New England's David Thomas recovered the fumble at the Chargers' 31-yard line. New England's drive seemed to stall after Brady fumbled on 3rd and 13. Patriots' tackle Matt Light recovered it and Chargers defensive back Drayton Florence drew a 15-yard unsportsmanlike conduct penalty for a personal foul. The drive continued and Gostkowski eventually kicked a 34-yard field goal to cut their deficit to 14–13. Then, on San Diego's next drive, linebacker Rosevelt Colvin made an interception of a Rivers pass at the New England 36-yard line. The Patriots then drove to the Chargers 41-yard line, but were halted there and had to punt. After the punt, Rivers completed two passes to tight end Antonio Gates for 31 yards and a 31-yard pass to Vincent Jackson, setting up Tomlinson's second rushing touchdown to give the Chargers an 8-point lead, 21–13.

New England responded by driving to San Diego's 41-yard line. On a fourth-down conversion attempt, Brady's pass was intercepted by Marlon McCree, but Troy Brown stripped the ball, and receiver Reche Caldwell recovered it. Schottenheimer then called a timeout challenging the officials call of interception and fumble by McCree. The Chargers forfeited the time out when the official ruling of the play was upheld. Four plays later, Brady threw a 4-yard touchdown pass to Caldwell. On the next play, running back Kevin Faulk took a direct snap and scored the two-point conversion, tying the game. Then, after forcing a punt, Brady completed a 19-yard pass to Daniel Graham. Two plays later, Caldwell caught a 49-yard pass down the right sideline to set up Gostkowski's third field goal (a 31 yarder) to give them a 24–21 lead with only 1:10 left in the fourth quarter. With no timeouts left, San Diego drove to the Patriots 36-yard line on their final possession, but Nate Kaeding's 54-yard field goal attempt fell short with three seconds remaining in the game.

After the game, the Patriots erupted in a controversial celebration, mocking the "Lights Out" dance of LB Shawne Merriman and stomping on the Chargers mid-field logo which made Chargers' quarterback Philip Rivers and running back LaDainian Tomlinson confront Patriots players. The controversy was a response to remarks made by Schottenheimer after the Chargers snapped the Patriots 21-game home winning streak in 2005 where he noted "I'll have to be honest. During the course of the week, I wondered, 'Is there a breaking point, where all of a sudden you can't find enough fingers to plug the dike?'," referencing the injuries the Patriots faced early in the 2005 season.

Gaffney finished with ten catches for 103 yards and a touchdown. Tomlinson rushed for 123 yards, caught two passes for 64 yards, and scored two touchdowns.

With the brutal loss, it ended the Chargers' season with an overall record of 14–3.

== Awards ==
Eleven Chargers were named to the 2007 Pro Bowl, and six were named first or second team Associated Press (AP) All-Pros. Tomlinson won the AP NFL Most Valuable Player award with 44 of the 50 available votes; Tomlinson also took the Offensive Player of the Year award with 38 votes from 50. Also, Merriman gained 6 votes for Defensive Player of the Year, Marcus McNeill had 6 votes for Offensive Rookie of the Year, and Schottenheimer received 2 votes for Coach of the Year.

Player	Position	Pro Bowl starter	Pro Bowl reserve	Pro Bowl alternate	AP 1st team All-Pro	AP 2nd team All-Pro
David Binn	Long snapper			Yes		
Antonio Gates	Tight end	Yes			Yes	
Nick Hardwick	Center		Yes			
Nate Kaeding	Kicker	Yes				Yes
Marcus McNeill	Tackle			Yes		
Shawne Merriman	Linebacker	Yes			Yes	
Lorenzo Neal	Fullback	Yes			Yes	
Kassim Osgood	Special teams	Yes				
Philip Rivers	Quarterback		Yes			
LaDainian Tomlinson	Running back	Yes			Yes	
Jamal Williams	Defensive tackle	Yes			Yes	
