= Mike Goff (American football) =

American football player and coach (born 1976)

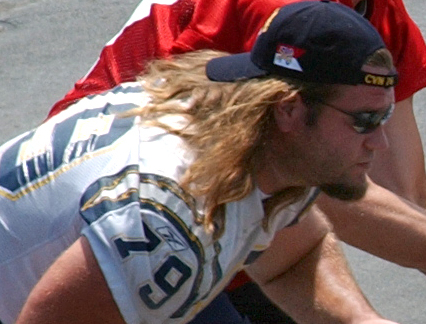
- Goff in 2006

Birmingham Stallions
- Title: Offensive line coach

Personal information
- Born: January 6, 1976 (age 50); Spring Valley, Illinois, U.S.
- Listed height: 6 ft 5 in (1.96 m)
- Listed weight: 312 lb (142 kg)

Career information
- Position: Guard (No. 63, 79)
- High school: LaSalle-Peru (LaSalle, Illinois)
- College: Iowa (1994–1997)
- NFL draft: 1998: 3rd round, 78th overall pick

Career history

Playing
- Cincinnati Bengals (1998–2003); San Diego Chargers (2004–2008); Kansas City Chiefs (2009)

Coaching
- San Diego State (2010–2011) Volunteer assistant; Hilltop HS (CA) (2014) Offensive line coach; USC (2015–2018) Offensive line coach; Western Kentucky (2019–2020) Offensive line coach; San Diego State (2021–2023) Offensive line coach; Colorado State (2024) Volunteer assistant; Colorado State (2025) Assistant offensive line coach; Birmingham Stallions (2026–present) Offensive line coach

Awards and highlights
- First-team All-Pro (2005); All-Pro (2006)

Career NFL statistics
- Games played: 171
- Games started: 154
- Fumble recoveries: 8
- Stats at Pro Football Reference

Michael Jason Goff (born January 6, 1976) is an American college football coach and former professional player who is the offensive line coach for the Birmingham Stallions of the United Football League (UFL). He played as a guard in the National Football League (NFL). Goff played collegiately for the Iowa Hawkeyes before being selected by the Cincinnati Bengals in the third round of the 1998 NFL draft.

== Early life ==
Goff is a 1994 graduate of LaSalle-Peru High School in LaSalle, Illinois. In his last season at LaSalle-Peru, Goff was a team captain and had 34 tackles, 24 assists and two sacks at defensive tackle which earned him All-America honors from Blue Chip Illustrated. He also was Illinois's sectional heavyweight wrestling champion and finished 6th at the state tournament.

== College career ==
Goff played in 47 games (24 starts) during his four-year career at Iowa (1994–1997). In his freshman campaign Goff played in 11 games.

He saw action in 12 games, opening the final 11 contests as a sophomore in 1995. Goff played in 12 games (one start) as a junior in ‘96 after suffering a back injury in the season opener. As a senior, he started all 12 games at right guard in 1997 for the nation’s eighth-ranked rush offense.

Goff majored in sociology at Iowa.

== Professional career ==
=== Cincinnati Bengals ===
Goff was selected by the Bengals with the 78th pick in the third round of the 1998 NFL draft. Future teammate in Cincinnati and San Diego Steve Foley was selected three spots below him. Before being drafted by the Bengals in 1998, he posted score of 38 on the Wonderlic intelligence test. It was the second-highest score among offensive linemen tested at the 1998 NFL Combine.

In his rookie season, Goff played in 10 games, starting five. He missed six games due to a partial ligament tear in his left knee.

In 1999, Goff started only one game, the season finale. The rest of the year, he saw reserve action at right guard.

In 2000, Goff became the starting right guard for the Bengals. During the season, he led Cincinnati's offensive line, playing in 991 of a possible 1,001 snaps. He was also a huge reason for the performance of Corey Dillon that year. Dillon rushed for 1,435 yards, a Bengals team record and their rush offense ranked second in NFL.

In 2001, Goff was once again the starting right guard for the Bengals and was the only offensive lineman to play all 1,071 offensive snaps as he and the rest of the offensive line allowed only 28 sacks, fourth-fewest in team history.

In his fifth year, Goff started all games he played in at right guard but missed three games due to a knee laceration.

In 2003, what would be his final season with the Bengals, Goff played and started all 16 games.

=== San Diego Chargers ===
On March 5, 2004, Mike Goff signed a five-year contract with the San Diego Chargers. Goff, then 28, received a $3.5 million signing bonus and the total of the deal was $13.25 million. After signing with the Chargers in 2004, Goff immediately assumed a leadership role on the offensive line. He took youngsters Nick Hardwick, Shane Olivea and Marcus McNeill under his wing. He even opened his Pacific Beach home to guard Kris Dielman and regularly hosted members of the offensive line and other current and former teammates to his house for dinner. Before the season, Goff embraced the role of the underdog saying "I don't give a (darn) what other people say,'' "They say that all the time, unless you got eight Pro Bowlers. Everyone always questions the offensive line. That's fine. You accept that challenge and it makes you want to work harder to prove everybody wrong." on Aug 20, 2004.

In his first year with the Bolts, he started all 16 games at right guard as he played between rookies Nick Hardwick and Shane Olivea. That year, the Chargers ranked sixth in rushing offense and allowed the fourth-fewest sacks in the league. After the season, Goff was named to the All-Joe Team by USA Today and earned second-team All-Pro honors from Football Digest.

In 2005, Goff started all 16 games at right guard as the Chargers ranked in the top ten in rushing offense and in the top half of the league in sacks allowed as he was the only offensive lineman to start all 16 contests for the Chargers. He was named first-team All-Pro by Sports Illustrated and earned USA Today All-Joe honors for the second year in a row.

In the 2006 season, Goff started all 16 games for the fourth consecutive season as the Chargers ranked second in rushing offense and eighth in sacks allowed. It was a special season for him and the Chargers. The team had a franchise best 14 and 2 record and running back LaDainian Tomlinson rushed for an NFL record 28 Touchdowns and 1,815 yards. Although he was not named to the Pro Bowl, two of his linemates were: Nick Hardwick and Marcus McNeil.

In 2007, Goff was once again constistent as the veteran started all 16 games at right guard and was named to the USA Today All-Joe team.

In his final season with the Chargers, 2008, Goff's performance decreased. He still started 16 games and was an effective starter but with the emergence of Jeromey Clary, the Chargers seemed keen to the idea of not resigning the veteran guard.

=== Kansas City Chiefs ===
Mar 25, 2009, Goff signed with the Kansas City Chiefs on a two-year deal. His first and only season in Kansas City was difficult and frustrating as he played in only 8 games for a Chiefs team that won only 4 games. On Feb 24th, 2010 the Chiefs released Goff.

== Coaching career ==
Mike Goff is in his first season as the offensive line coach at Western Kentucky University. Prior to joining WKU, Goff worked as graduate assistant coach for the offensive line at USC as well as an offensive and defensive analyst.

Prior to joining USC, Coach Goff was an offensive line volunteer assistant coach at San Diego State for 2 seasons (2010–11) and an assistant coach at Hilltop High School in Chula Vista, California (2014).

== Personal life ==
One of Goff’s most recognizable characteristics used to be his long hair. In the summer of 2007, Goff cut his hair for a good cause as he donated it to Locks of Love, a public non-profit organization that provides hairpieces for children under 18 who have lost their hair as a result of undergoing chemotherapy treatments.

Outside of football, Goff’s hobbies include reading, movies, golf, fishing and traveling, but his favorite hobby is cooking. Mike learned to cook by watching The Food Network and enjoys having teammates over to the house to sample his many specialty dishes. Since then, they have crowned him with the nickname “Chef.”

Today, Goff is married and lives in the San Diego area. He regularly contributes as an analyst on XTRA Sports 1360, a San Diego sports radio. He has a Twitter account and can be followed at @mikegoff79.
