= Mike Scifres =

American football player (born 1980)

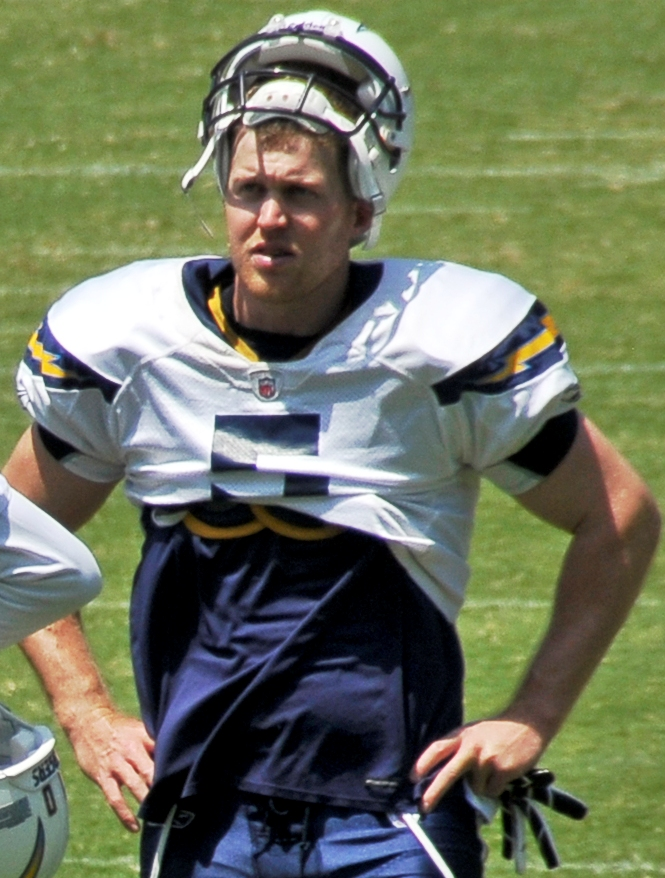
- Scifres with the San Diego Chargers in 2008

Arizona State Sun Devils
- Title: Specialist coach

Personal information
- Born: October 8, 1980 (age 46); Metairie, Louisiana, U.S.
- Listed height: 6 ft 2 in (1.88 m)
- Listed weight: 215 lb (98 kg)

Career information
- High school: Destrehan (Destrehan, Louisiana)
- College: Western Illinois
- NFL draft: 2003: 5th round, 149th overall pick

Career history

Playing
- San Diego Chargers (2003–2015); Carolina Panthers (2016)*
- * Offseason or practice squad member only

Coaching
- 2026-present: Arizona State (specialist)

Awards and highlights
- San Diego Chargers 50th Anniversary Team

Career NFL statistics
- Punts: 756
- Punting yards: 34,152
- Punting average: 45.2
- Stats at Pro Football Reference

Michael T. Scifres (born October 8, 1980) is an American football coach and former player who is the specialist coach at Arizona State. He played professionally as a punter in the National Football League (NFL). He played the majority of his career with the San Diego Chargers and is included on the Chargers 50th Anniversary Team. He played college football for the Western Illinois Leathernecks.

== Early life ==
Scifres attended Destrehan High School in Destrehan, Louisiana and lettered in football, soccer, and baseball. In football, he was an All-District selection. He was a teammate of former NFL player and member of the Pro Football Hall of Fame, Ed Reed, for two seasons. Scifres graduated from Destrehan High School in 1998.

== College career ==
While playing for Western Illinois, Scifres was the only punter from NCAA Div 1-AA (now called the Football Championship Division) to become a 2002 finalist of the Ray Guy Award, given to the nation's top punter. He set a school and conference record with an 89-yard punt against Southwest Missouri State in 2000. Scifres also kicked a game-winning 56-yard field goal in his first career attempt in 1999. Two-time First-team All-American selection by Football Gazette, Three-time All-conference selection, Seven-time National player of the week, and Five-time Conference player of the week. His college nickname was Scabies. He graduated from Western Illinois University with a degree in Communications & Broadcasting.

== Professional career ==
Pre-draft measurables
Height	Weight	Arm length	Hand span
6 ft 2 1/2 in (1.89 m)	236 lb (107 kg)	30 in (0.76 m)	9 1/4 in (0.23 m)
All values from NFL Combine

=== San Diego Chargers ===
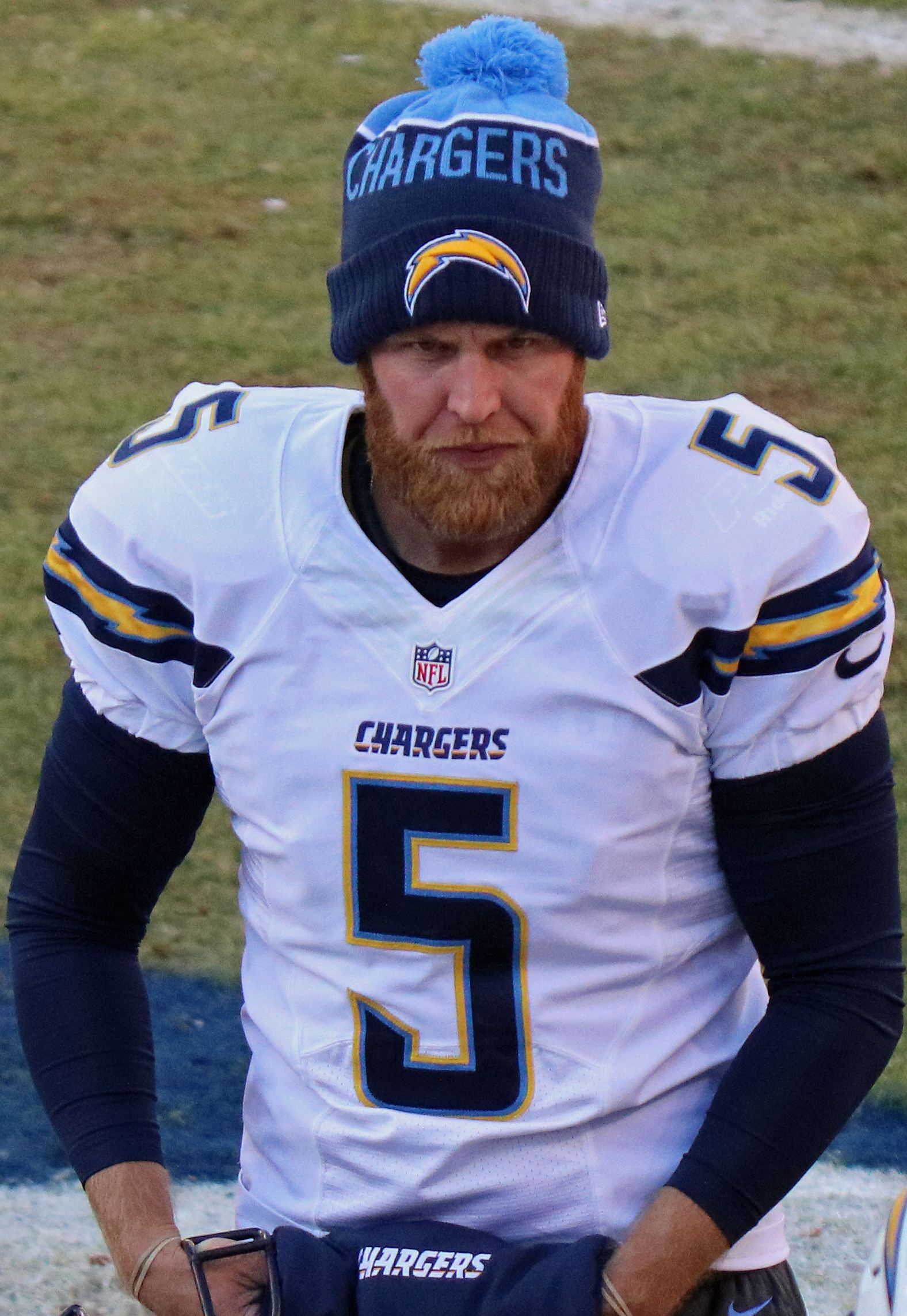
Scifres with the Chargers in Jan. 2016

Scifres was selected with the 149th overall pick in the fifth round of the 2003 NFL draft out of Western Illinois University.

In the Chargers' 2009 Wild Card Playoff versus the Colts, Scifres kicked a 67-yard punt and averaged 51.7 yards with six punts. Also, all his punts during the game were inside the Colts' 20-yard line, with 4 inside their 10-yard line. Perhaps Scifres's best punt of the game was the last, a 52-yard kick launched from the San Diego 47 yard line that bounced out of bounds at the Colts' 1, pinning Indianapolis deep and allowing the Chargers' defense to force the Colts to punt the ball away from the back of their own end zone. Scifres said after the game, "I don't know if you can dream a game like this." Scifres also made some clutch punts near the end of the 2007 Chargers' AFC Divisional Playoff Game that pinned the Colts back deep in their own territory and ultimately helped thwart the Colts' QB Peyton Manning's come back attempts. In week 11 against the Denver Broncos Scifres completed his first NFL completion to Mike Tolbert for 28 yards.

In 2012, Scifres, already the team’s record-holder for career punting average (45.3), was voted the team’s Special Teams Player of the Year last season after setting a new team record with an average of 48.3 yards per punt, a mark that shattered the previous high of 46.7, which he set back in 2010. And thanks to the Chargers’ outstanding coverage units, Scifres posted a 40.6-yard net average in 2012, second in the franchise's 53-year history.

In 2014, U-T San Diego wrote that Scifres "arguably was the team MVP" in a Week 11 win over the Oakland Raiders after he landed punts on the Raiders' own 2-, 4-, 6-, 8- and 12-yard line. In a 23–14 loss in Week 14 to the New England Patriots, he suffered a clavicle fracture on a blocked punt, when his body was twisted mid-air and his shoulder landed hard on the ground. The Chargers placed him on injured reserve after he had season-ending surgery.

On April 30, 2016, Scifres was released by the Chargers, who informed him that they were going to select punter Drew Kaser in the 2016 NFL draft that day.

=== Carolina Panthers ===
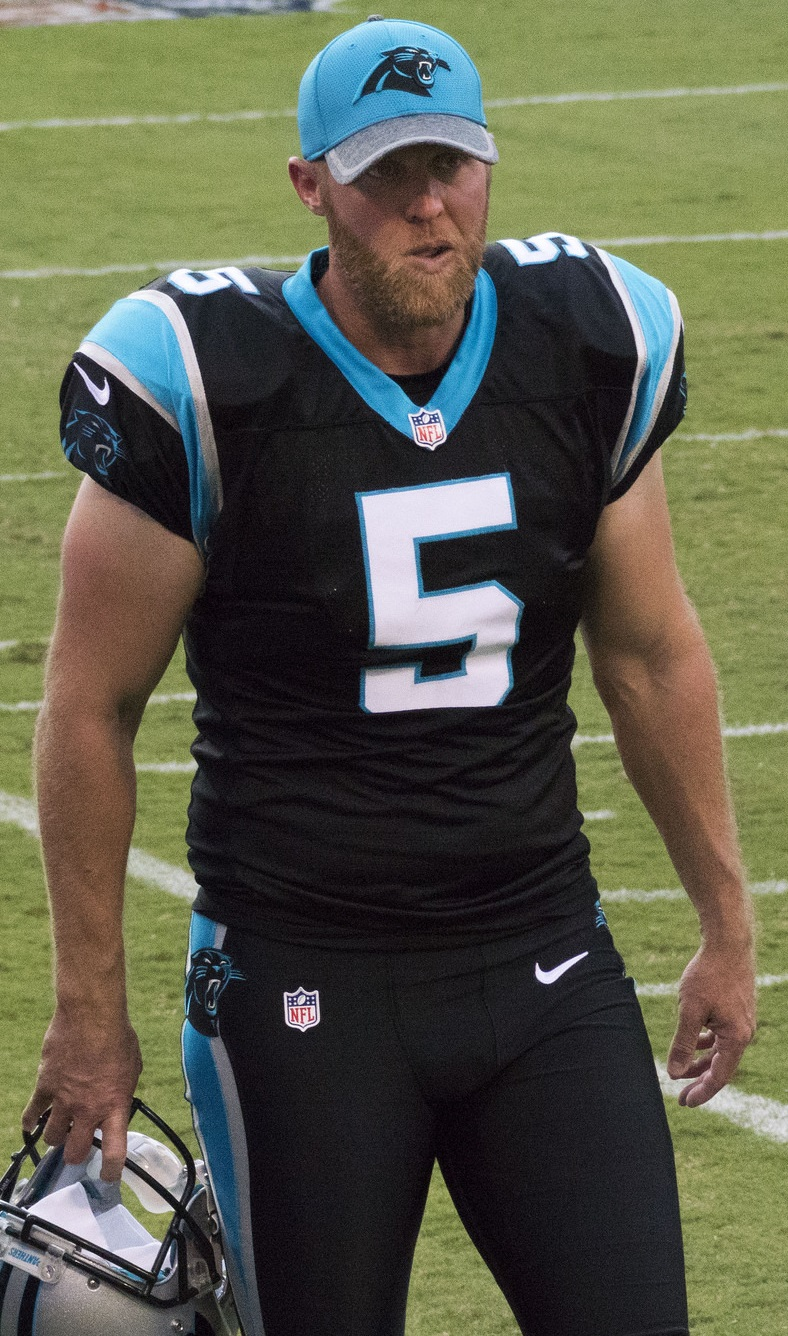
Scifres with the Panthers in 2016

Scifres signed a one-year contract with the Carolina Panthers on June 7, 2016. He was released via injury settlement on August 31, 2016.

== NFL career statistics ==
Legend
	Led the league
**Bold**	Career high

=== Regular season ===
Year	Team	Punting									
Year	Team	GP	Punts	Yds	Net Yds	Lng	Avg	Net Avg	Blk	Ins20	TB
2003	SDG	6	0	0	0	0	0.0	0.0	0	0	0
2004	SDG	**16**	69	2,974	2,650	60	43.1	38.4	0	29	8
2005	SDG	**16**	71	3,104	2,700	71	43.7	38.0	0	25	8
2006	SDG	**16**	69	2,893	2,637	71	41.9	38.2	0	35	2
2007	SDG	**16**	**81**	3,735	3,244	70	46.1	39.6	1	**36**	**9**
2008	SDG	**16**	51	2,332	2,086	67	45.7	**40.9**	0	19	5
2009	SDG	**16**	52	2,342	2,037	65	45.0	39.2	0	23	2
2010	SDG	**16**	52	2,430	1,722	67	46.7	30.8	**4**	13	**9**
2011	SDG	**16**	47	2,234	1,865	71	47.5	39.7	0	17	2
2012	SDG	**16**	**81**	**3,914**	**3,412**	66	**48.3**	40.6	3	30	7
2013	SDG	**16**	56	2,417	2,239	61	43.2	40.0	0	30	1
2014	SDG	13	55	2,516	2,180	**72**	45.7	38.9	1	21	6
2015	SDG	**16**	72	3,261	2,789	68	45.3	38.2	1	15	2
Career		195	756	34,152	29,561	72	45.2	38.6	10	293	61

=== Playoffs ===
Year	Team	Punting									
Year	Team	GP	Punts	Yds	Net Yds	Lng	Avg	Net Avg	Blk	Ins20	TB
2004	SDG	1	5	182	182	42	36.4	36.4	0	1	0
2006	SDG	1	7	256	256	51	36.6	36.6	0	5	0
2007	SDG	**3**	**12**	530	449	66	44.2	37.4	0	4	**1**
2008	SDG	2	**12**	**599**	**520**	**67**	**49.9**	43.3	0	**7**	0
2009	SDG	1	6	297	263	60	49.5	**43.8**	0	3	0
2013	SDG	2	10	466	374	62	46.6	37.4	0	3	**1**
Career		10	52	2,330	2,044	67	44.8	39.3	0	23	2
