= Brandon Manumaleuna =

American football player (born 1980)

No. 86
- Position: Tight end

Personal information
- Born: January 4, 1980 (age 46); Torrance, California, U.S.
- Listed height: 6 ft 2 in (1.88 m)
- Listed weight: 295 lb (134 kg)

Career information
- High school: Narbonne (Harbor City, California)
- College: Arizona
- NFL draft: 2001: 4th round, 129th overall pick

Career history
- St. Louis Rams (2001–2005); San Diego Chargers (2006–2009); Chicago Bears (2010)

Awards and highlights
- Second-team All-Pac-10 (1999)

Career NFL statistics
- Receptions: 115
- Receiving yards: 1,008
- Receiving touchdowns: 13
- Stats at Pro Football Reference

Brandon Michael Manumaleuna (/ˌmɑːnuːmɑːliːˈuːnə/; born January 4, 1980) is an American former professional football player who was a tight end in the National Football League (NFL). He played college football for the Arizona Wildcats and was selected by the St. Louis Rams in the fourth round of the 2001 NFL draft.

Manumaleuna was also a member of the San Diego Chargers and Chicago Bears.

== Early life ==
Manumaleuna is of Samoan and African-American descent. He attended Narbonne High School in Harbor City, California. While at Narbonne High he was selected Second-team All-State as a defensive end. He also lettered in basketball and track.

== College career ==
Manumaleuna attended the University of Arizona from 1997 - 2000, where he was a Second-team All-Pac-10 as a junior. While at Arizona he majored in political science.

Manumaleuna began his play at Arizona as a defensive end and made the switch to tight end and H-back. He finished his collegiate career with 40 receptions for 544 yards and three touchdowns.

== Professional career ==
=== Pre-draft ===
Pre-draft measurables
Height	Weight	40-yard dash	10-yard split	20-yard split	20-yard shuttle	Three-cone drill	Vertical jump	Broad jump
6 ft 2 1/8 in (1.88 m)	275 lb (125 kg)	4.99 s	1.71 s	2.82 s	4.26 s	7.49 s	30 in (0.76 m)	8 ft 10 in (2.69 m)
All values from NFL Combine.

=== St. Louis Rams ===
Manumaleuna was selected in the fourth round (129th overall) of the 2001 NFL draft by the St. Louis Rams. He signed with the team on June 21, 2001. He agreed to a three-year $1.15 million contract including a $255,000 signing bonus. In 2001, Manumaleuna only had one reception on the season. He made his first career reception, a one-yard touchdown, against the Tampa Bay Buccaneers. In 2002, Manumaleuna recorded eight receptions on the season for 106 yards and one touchdown. Manumaleuna recorded two receptions against the San Francisco 49ers, San Diego Chargers, and Kansas City Chiefs. He had a season-high 38 receiving yards against the Chargers. He recorded his lone touchdown catch against the 49ers.

In 2003, Manumaleuna had a career year, with highs in receptions (29) yards (238) and touchdowns (two). Manumaleuna caught a 39 yard pass against the Atlanta Falcons. He finished that game with a career-high 56 yards receiving. Manumaleuna recorded a season-high four receptions against the Green Bay Packers. He scored his first touchdown of the season on a four-yard pass at the Chicago Bears. Manumaleuna recorded his second touchdown of the season on an eight-yard pass at the Detroit Lions.

On March 12, 2004, Manumaleuna signed a five-year, $8.3 million offer sheet with the Carolina Panthers which the Rams matched four days later. In 2004, Manumaleuna recorded 15 receptions for 174 yards and one touchdown. Manumaleuna recorded a season-high three receptions for 33 yards and an eight-yard touchdown catch at the Seattle Seahawks. He also recorded three receptions for a season high 53 yards against the New England Patriots. Manumaleuna recorded career long 48-yard reception against the Patriots as well.

In 2005, Manumaleuna recorded 13 receptions for 129 yards and one touchdown. Manumaleuna recorded a six-yard touchdown catch in the season opener at the San Francisco 49ers. He was inactive for weeks four and five because of a knee injury. Manumaleuna recorded season highs with three receptions for 51 yards in Seattle, which included a season-long, 33-yard reception.

=== San Diego Chargers ===
On April 30, 2006, Manumaleuna was traded by the St. Louis Rams to the San Diego Chargers for a fourth round pick. In 2006, Manumaleuna recorded 14 receptions for 91 yards and three touchdowns. Manumaleuna recorded a season high four receptions and his first touchdown reception of the season during week six at the Kansas City Chiefs at Arrowhead Stadium. He recorded a touchdown reception on a halfback option pass from LaDainian Tomlinson, in the season opening win at the Oakland Raiders. Manumaleuna had an extensive role in blocking for a 216-yard, three touchdown rushing day against the Rams. He had a hand in the Chargers' win over the Cincinnati Bengals with a career-high two touchdown receptions. The first of which was for nine yards and the second was on a third-and-five play late in the fourth quarter. Manumaleuna recorded two receptions against the Denver Broncos was a run after a reception in which he broke several tackles and lost his helmet en route to a 19-yard gain on third-and-seven in the late second quarter.

In 2007, Manumaleuna recorded 10 receptions for 86 yards and one touchdown. Manumaleuna recorded one reception for four yards during the season opener against the Chicago Bears. During week six he recorded two receptions for 18 yards against the Oakland Raiders. In week eight against the Houston Texans, Manumaleuna recorded one reception for two yards. During week nine at the Minnesota Vikings, he recorded two receptions for 13 yards. In week 12, Manumaleuna recorded one reception for zero yards, against the Baltimore Ravens. The next week at the Kansas City Chiefs he recorded two catches for 48 yards. His 40-yard catch was his longest catch since 2004. During week 15 against the Detroit Lions, Manumaleuna recorded one reception for one yard and one touchdown on a pass from quarterback Philip Rivers. He recorded two receptions for 18 yards against the Tennessee Titans in the AFC Wild Card game. He then recorded one reception for three yards in the AFC Divisional Championship game.

In 2008, he played 16 games, starting 11, and caught 15 passes for 127 yards and two touchdowns. The following year, he played in 16 games with 5 starts and caught 5 passes for thirteen yards.

=== Chicago Bears ===
On March 5, 2010, Manumaleuna signed a five-year $15 million deal ($6.1 guaranteed) contract with the Chicago Bears on the first day of free agency. He was released on July 28, 2011, after one season in Chicago.

== NFL career statistics ==
Legend
**Bold**	Career high

=== Regular season ===
Year	Team	Games		Receiving					
Year	Team	GP	GS	Tgt	Rec	Yds	Avg	Lng	TD
2001	STL	**16**	0	1	1	1	1.0	1	1
2002	STL	**16**	10	14	8	106	**13.3**	27	1
2003	STL	**16**	15	**45**	**29**	**238**	8.2	39	2
2004	STL	**16**	**16**	21	15	174	11.6	**48**	1
2005	STL	14	14	20	13	129	9.9	33	1
2006	SD	**16**	7	17	14	91	6.5	19	**3**
2007	SD	**16**	12	15	10	86	8.6	40	1
2008	SD	**16**	11	19	15	127	8.5	17	2
2009	SD	**16**	5	7	5	13	2.6	11	0
2010	CHI	**16**	13	7	5	43	8.6	16	1
		158	103	166	115	1,008	8.8	48	13

=== Playoffs ===
Year	Team	Games		Receiving					
Year	Team	GP	GS	Tgt	Rec	Yds	Avg	Lng	TD
2001	STL	**3**	0	0	0	0	0.0	0	0
2003	STL	1	1	1	1	19	**19.0**	**19**	0
2004	STL	2	**2**	2	1	18	18.0	18	0
2006	SD	1	1	1	0	0	0.0	0	0
2007	SD	**3**	**2**	**4**	**3**	**21**	7.0	9	0
2008	SD	2	**2**	**4**	1	14	14.0	14	0
2009	SD	1	0	0	0	0	0.0	0	0
2010	CHI	2	**2**	0	0	0	0.0	0	0
		15	10	12	6	72	12.0	19	0

== Personal ==
Manumaleuna means "bird-of-paradise". Manumaleuna's other interests include playing basketball and spending time with his family. He is a second-generation NFL player. His father, Frank Manumaleuga, played linebacker for the Kansas City Chiefs from 1979 to 1981. Frank played at UCLA in the early 1970s. Brandon showed early signs of following in his father's footsteps. At the age of 11, he won the NFL's Punt, Pass, and Kick Competition.

Manumaleuna is a member of the Church of Jesus Christ of Latter-day Saints.
