= Marcus McNeill =

American football player (born 1983)

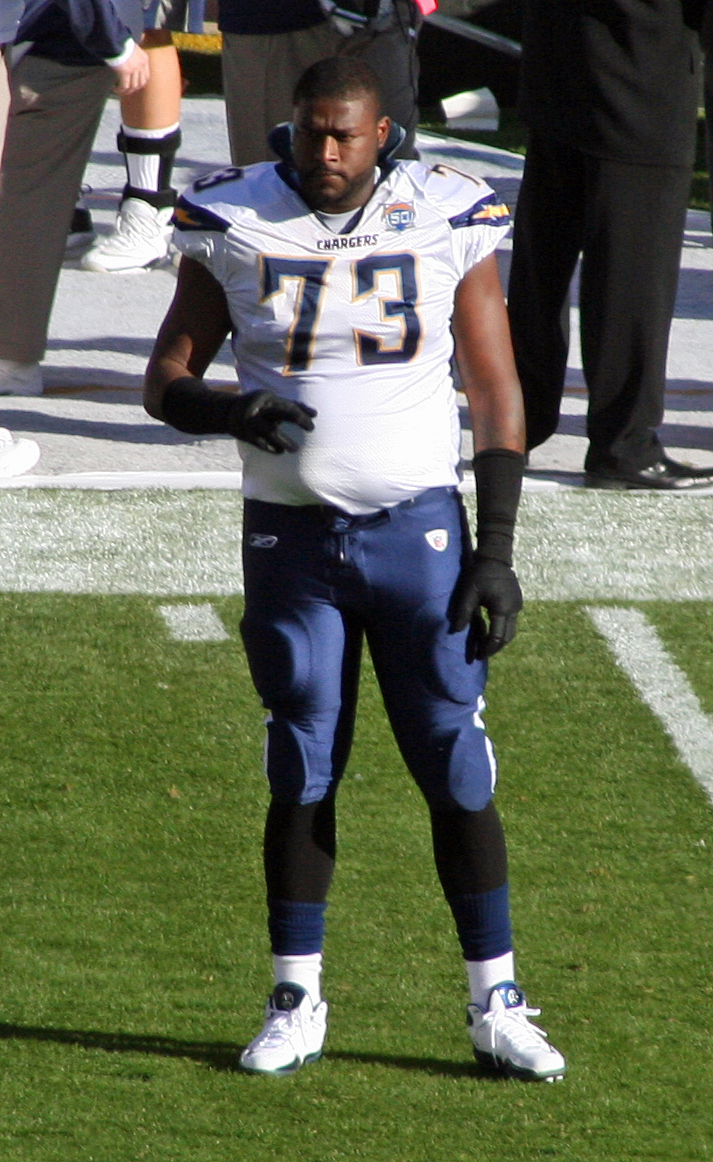
- McNeill with the San Diego Chargers in 2009

No. 73
- Position: Offensive tackle

Personal information
- Born: November 16, 1983 (age 42); Chicago, Illinois, U.S.
- Listed height: 6 ft 8 in (2.03 m)
- Listed weight: 336 lb (152 kg)

Career information
- High school: Cedar Grove (Ellenwood, Georgia)
- College: Auburn
- NFL draft: 2006: 2nd round, 50th overall pick

Career history
- San Diego Chargers (2006–2011)

Awards and highlights
- 2× Pro Bowl (2006, 2007); PFWA All-Rookie Team (2006); 2× First-team All-American (2004, 2005); Jacobs Blocking Trophy (2005); 2× First-team All-SEC (2004, 2005)

Career NFL statistics
- Games played: 82
- Games started: 82
- Fumble recoveries: 2
- Stats at Pro Football Reference

Marcus McNeill (born November 16, 1983) is an American former professional football player who was an offensive tackle for six seasons with the San Diego Chargers of the National Football League (NFL). He played college football for the Auburn Tigers football, and was two-time All-American. San Diego selected McNeill in the second round of the 2006 NFL draft, and he played his entire pro career with the Chargers. He was selected to the Pro Bowl twice.

== Early life ==
McNeill was born in Chicago, Illinois. He attended Cedar Grove High School in southern DeKalb County, Georgia (a suburb of Atlanta), and played both offensive and defensive line for the Cedar Grove Saints, earning SuperPrep All-American honors. He played in the Georgia-Florida High School All-Star Game as a senior. McNeill was also a standout track star finishing second in the state in the shot put.

== College career ==
McNeill attended Auburn University, where he played for coach Tommy Tuberville's Auburn Tigers football team from 2002 to 2005. He started 28 total games in his four years as a lineman. He blocked for future NFL running backs Cadillac Williams and Ronnie Brown, and allowed only one quarterback sack as a guard. Following his 2004 junior season during which he helped lead the Auburn Tigers to an undefeated 13–0 record, he was a first-team All-SEC selection, and a first-team All-American. After his senior season in 2005, he again received first-team All-SEC honors and was recognized as a consensus first-team All-American; he was later named to The Sporting News All-Decade Team.

== Professional career ==
McNeill was selected with the 50th overall pick in the second round of the 2006 NFL draft. McNeill worked out at D1 Sports Training in Nashville, TN prior to the NFL Draft. Despite a stellar college career at Auburn, many teams were worried about McNeill's injury history; namely having spinal stenosis or a narrowing of the spine and the fact that he did not do much weight training at Auburn. McNeill was unable to lift during pre-draft workouts due to a fractured right hand. Despite these obstacles, McNeill still impressed with his physically imposing size and 35 3/8 in (900 mm) arms.

Pre-draft measurables
Height	Weight	Arm length	Hand span	40-yard dash	10-yard split	20-yard split	20-yard shuttle	Three-cone drill	Vertical jump	Broad jump	Wonderlic
6 ft 7 5/8 in (2.02 m)	336 lb (152 kg)	35 3/8 in (0.90 m)	10 1/2 in (0.27 m)	5.07 s	1.80 s	2.98 s	5.00 s	8.19 s	31 in (0.79 m)	8 ft 2 in (2.49 m)	23
All results from the 2006 NFL Combine

Despite being the seventh lineman selected in the 2006 draft and playing the majority of the season with broken hands, McNeill was voted a first alternate to the 2007 Pro Bowl and made the team after an injury to starter Willie Anderson. Commentator Len Pasquarelli of ESPN.com referred to him late in the 2006 season as "one of the elite left tackles" in the NFL. A rookie starter at left tackle for the entire season, McNeill was a crucial component of the offensive line that blocked for running back LaDainian Tomlinson as he established a number of single season offensive records. The majority of Tomlinson's long gains came from running behind the left side of the offensive line, behind McNeill and guard Kris Dielman. McNeill was not called for a single holding penalty in the 2006 season.

McNeill finished 4th in voting for the 2006 NFL Offensive Rookie of the Year, a remarkable finish for an offensive lineman. He was named the Offensive Rookie of the Month for September.

The next season McNeill was again named to the Pro Bowl after Jonathan Ogden pulled out.

In 2010 McNeill was a holdout from Chargers camp. He ended his hold out on September 25 and reported to the San Diego Chargers. A few days after ending his hold out, McNeill and the Chargers agreed to a 6-year, $48.895 million deal.

After managing to play only nine games in 2011 due to poor health, numerous sources expected the Chargers to release McNeill in the offseason. On March 13, 2012, he was released.

On August 9, 2012, he announced his retirement from the NFL.
