= Jeromey Clary =

American football player (born 1983)

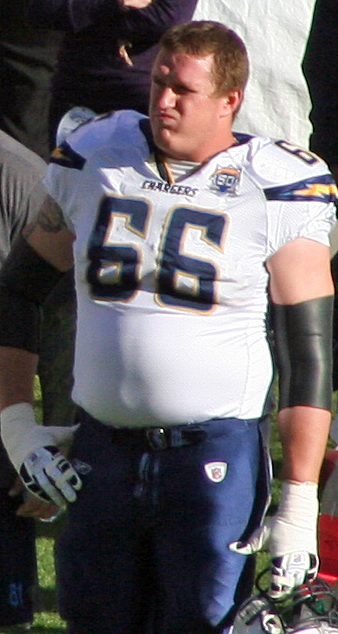
- Clary with the San Diego Chargers in 2009

No. 66
- Position: Offensive tackle

Personal information
- Born: November 5, 1983 (age 43); Norfolk, Nebraska, U.S.
- Listed height: 6 ft 6 in (1.98 m)
- Listed weight: 320 lb (145 kg)

Career information
- High school: Mansfield (Mansfield, Texas)
- College: Kansas State
- NFL draft: 2006: 6th round, 187th overall pick

Career history
- San Diego Chargers (2006–2014)

Awards and highlights
- 2× Second-team All-Big 12 (2004, 2005)

Career NFL statistics
- Games played: 103
- Games started: 93
- Stats at Pro Football Reference

Jeromey W. Clary (born November 5, 1983) is an American former professional football player who was an offensive lineman for his entire nine-year career with the San Diego Chargers of the National Football League (NFL). He played college football for the Kansas State Wildcats and was selected by the Chargers in the sixth round of the 2006 NFL draft.

== Early life ==
Clary attended Mansfield High School in Mansfield, Texas.

== College career ==
Clary closed out his Kansas State career as one of the top offensive tackles in the Big 12 Conference, where he excelled on the field, as well as in the classroom. He was selected to the Academic All-District VII team as a senior and was also a three-time Academic All-Big 12 first-team selection. During his collegiate career, Clary showed his versatility by playing both tackle positions. Clary proved to be an extremely durable player during his Wildcat career, starting 37 consecutive games over his final three seasons.

Clary earned his bachelor's degree in psychology and graduated in December 2005.

== Professional career ==
Pre-draft measurables
Height	Weight	Arm length	Hand span	40-yard dash	10-yard split	20-yard split	20-yard shuttle	Three-cone drill	Vertical jump	Broad jump	Bench press
6 ft 6 1/8 in (1.98 m)	309 lb (140 kg)	33 1/2 in (0.85 m)	9 1/4 in (0.23 m)	5.26 s	1.85 s	3.09 s	4.63 s	7.75 s	29.5 in (0.75 m)	8 ft 6 in (2.59 m)	26 reps
All values from NFL Combine/Pro Day

The San Diego Chargers selected Clary out of Kansas State with their pick in the sixth round (187th overall) of the 2006 NFL draft.

In his rookie season, Clary spent the year on the Chargers' practice squad.

Clary became a starter late in the 2007 season. A reserve for most of the year, the coaches inserted him into the starting lineup at right tackle in early December to give the team’s struggling running game a spark. Over the final five games, the Chargers rushed for 880 yards, scored eight touchdowns and went 5-0. Clary’s ascension into the starting lineup helped the Chargers capture the AFC West title en route to a berth in the AFC Championship Game.

Clary earned the starting right tackle spot in mini camp. Following the 2008 season, he was awarded $405,859 in additional pay from the NFL's performance-based pay system, which gives financial compensation based on a comparison of playing time to salary; this made him the biggest beneficiary in 2008.

Clary re-signed a one-year contract with the Chargers during the 2009 off-season. Clary was the Chargers’ winner of the Ed Block Courage Award in 2010 after recovering from a serious ankle injury in 2009 that required surgery. He came back from the injury and played every snap during the 2010 and ’11 seasons.

Clary again re-signed with the Chargers, this time on a four-year, $20 million contract almost immediately following the lockout during the 2011 offseason. The contract was front loaded, so Clary earned $8.5 million in the first year. Clary went on to start and play in all 16 games for the Chargers in 2011.

In 2012, Clary started and played in 14 games for the Chargers at right tackle, missing two games due to a knee injury.

Clary was moved to right guard during the 2013 season after the Chargers selected D.J. Fluker in the first round of the 2013 NFL draft.

After starting in 93 of his 103 career games, recurring problems with Clary's hip sidelined him for the entire 2014 season. On January 8, 2015, he announced his retirement from the NFL.

== Personal life ==
Clary and his wife, Breanna, have two sons, Cannon and Jackson.

Clary enjoys country music. His favorite artist is Zac Brown Band. His hobbies include golf and spending time with his family at San Diego’s beaches and amusement parks.
