= Nick Hardwick (American football) =

American football player (born 1981)

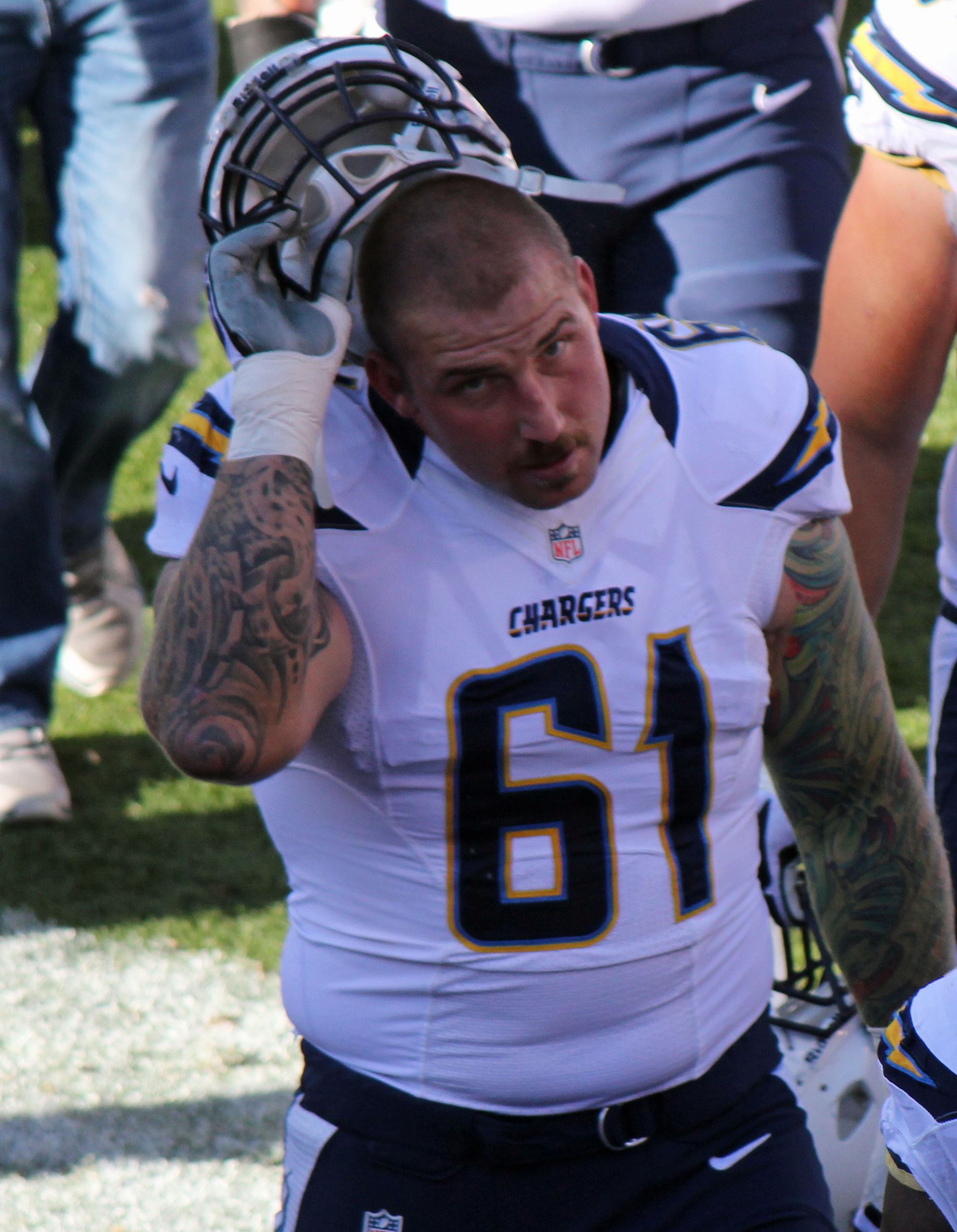
- Hardwick with the San Diego Chargers in 2012

Los Angeles Chargers
- Title: Assistant offensive line coach

Personal information
- Born: September 2, 1981 (age 45); Franklin, Indiana, U.S.
- Listed height: 6 ft 4 in (1.93 m)
- Listed weight: 305 lb (138 kg)

Career information
- Position: Center (No. 61)
- High school: Lawrence North (Indianapolis, Indiana)
- College: Purdue (2000–2003)
- NFL draft: 2004: 3rd round, 66th overall pick

Career history

Playing
- San Diego Chargers (2004–2014)

Coaching
- Westfield HS (IN) (2022–2023) Offensive line coach; Los Angeles Chargers (2024–present) Assistant offensive line coach

Awards and highlights
- Pro Bowl (2006); San Diego Chargers 50th Anniversary Team; Second-team All-Big Ten (2003)

Career NFL statistics
- Games played: 136
- Games started: 136
- Fumble recoveries: 3
- Stats at Pro Football Reference

Nicholas Adam Hardwick (born September 2, 1981) is an American former professional football player who was a center in the National Football League (NFL), playing his entire 11-year career for the San Diego Chargers. He serves as the assistant offensive line coach for the Chargers. He was selected by the Chargers in the third round of the 2004 NFL draft, and was named to the Pro Bowl in 2006. He played college football for the Purdue Boilermakers.

== Early life ==
Hardwick attended at Lawrence North High School in Indianapolis, Indiana. Unlike most future college and NFL players, he did not play high school football, having "ditched" the sport in the ninth grade. He was a three-year varsity letterman in wrestling and was an Indiana state runner-up as an individual, with his team winning a state championship.

== College career ==
Hardwick was a sophomore economics major at Purdue University when his future San Diego Chargers teammate Drew Brees led the Boilermakers to the 2001 Rose Bowl. Inspired, he joined the football team as a walk-on, initially playing as a defensive tackle. The next year, he became the team's starting center and earned all-Big Ten honors. During his senior year, his starting quarterback was Kyle Orton, who was selected the following year.

== Professional career ==
Hardwick was picked with the 66th overall selection in the third round of the 2004 NFL draft by the Chargers.

Pre-draft measurables
Height	Weight	Arm length	Hand span	40-yard dash	10-yard split	20-yard split	20-yard shuttle	Three-cone drill	Vertical jump	Broad jump	Bench press	Wonderlic
6 ft 3 1/2 in (1.92 m)	295 lb (134 kg)	32 7/8 in (0.84 m)	9 3/4 in (0.25 m)	5.10 s	1.80 s	3.00 s	4.55 s	7.23 s	34.0 in (0.86 m)	9 ft 6 in (2.90 m)	27 reps	28
All values from NFL Combine/Pro Day

In 2004, Hardwick began his career by starting all 14 games he played in when incumbent starter Jason Ball held out due to a contract dispute. During the year, the Chargers ranked sixth in rushing offense and allowed the fourth-fewest sacks in the league.

In his second year as a pro, he again started all games he played in as the Chargers ranked in the top ten in rushing offense and in the top half of the league in sacks allowed.

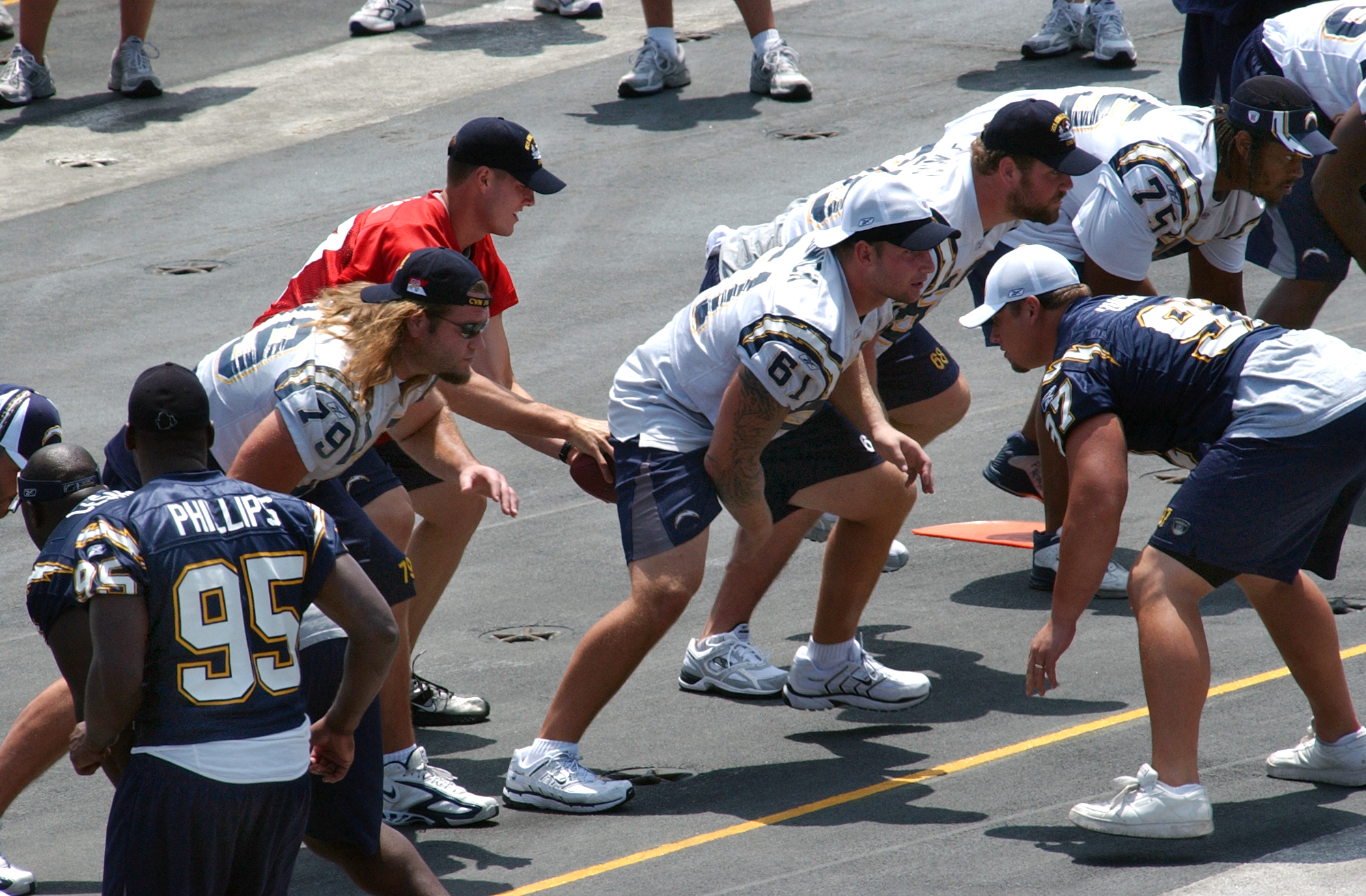
Hardwick (No. 61) snapping the ball to Philip Rivers on USS Ronald Reagan, in 2006

During the 2006 off-season, he agreed to a five-year $17 million contract extension with the Chargers. He then went on to start all 16 games for the first time in his career as the Chargers ranked second in rushing offense and eighth in sacks allowed.

In December 2006, Hardwick was named the backup center for the AFC squad in the 2007 Pro Bowl, Jeff Saturday being the starter. He was one of 11 Chargers selected to the Pro Bowl that year.

In his fourth season with San Diego, he started 12 games, being forced to miss 4 due to a foot injury.

In 2008, Hardwick was inactive for the first three weeks of the season while recovering from an offseason foot injury. He returned to the starting lineup at center in Week 4 to play the remaining 13 games.

In 2009, Hardwick suffered an ankle injury so severe that it nearly ended his career. He missed 13 games that season, but returned in time for a late-season push to the playoffs and he hasn't missed a game since.

2010 was a comeback year for the center as he was back to his usual form. He started all 16 games for the second time of his career.

In 2011, Hardwick played another full season starting every game. He was one of the few players on a crippled offensive line hurt by multiple injuries. After the 2011 season ended, Hardwick became an unrestricted free agent, he had recently become a new father, and he had just watched one of his best friends and linemates, left guard Kris Dielman retire after suffering a serious concussion. All three factors led Hardwick to ponder whether he wanted to continue playing football, and if he did, whether he wanted to play it in San Diego or make a fresh start elsewhere. Hardwick decided to stay in San Diego and finish his career there, opting to sign a new three-year contract with the Chargers, worth $13,500,000.

In his 10th year with the Chargers, Hardwick maintained his place at center, starting in all 16 games and earning Chargers' Lineman of the Year honors for the second time in a row. However, quarterback Philip Rivers was sacked 49 times, a career high, due to the offensive line's struggle with injury and poor performance.

On September 10, 2014, the Chargers placed Hardwick on injured reserve with a neck injury, ending his season after one game. He announced his retirement on February 2, 2015.

Serious health concerns played a large part in Hardwick's decision to retire. "Nerves were getting compressed through various forms. My hands were going numb during training camp for weeks at a time. I was losing feeling in my fingers up through my elbows. I was having a bunch of stingers. On a daily basis, my hands were asleep, my elbows were burning, and I was losing a normalcy to life. It became reckless to continue playing".

== Personal life ==
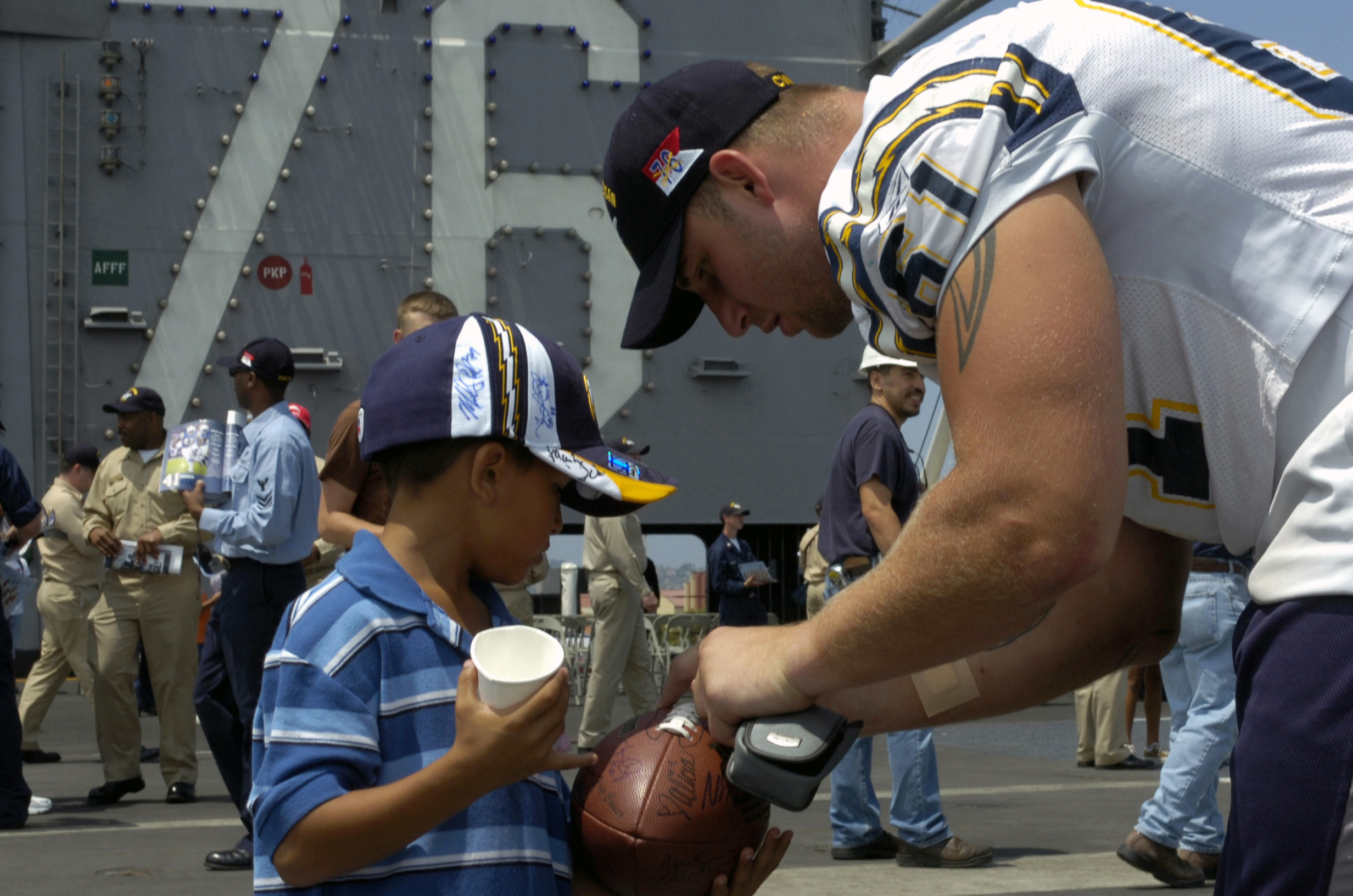
Hardwick signing an autograph.

Hardwick is married to his college sweetheart Jayme-Lee Biamonte, who played for the Boilermakers women's soccer team and currently serves as the San Diego State Aztecs women's soccer assistant coach. They have two sons.
