= 2011 San Diego Chargers season =

NFL team 52nd season

- Owner: Alex Spanos
- General manager: A. J. Smith
- Head coach: Norv Turner
- Home stadium: Qualcomm Stadium

Results
- Record: 8–8
- Division place: 2nd AFC West
- Playoffs: Did not qualify
- All-Pros: 1: S Eric Weddle (1st team)
- Pro Bowlers: 5: TE Antonio Gates; WR Vincent Jackson; RB Ryan Mathews; QB Philip Rivers; S Eric Weddle

The 2011 season was the San Diego Chargers' 42nd in the National Football League (NFL) and their 52nd overall. The team failed to improve on its 9–7 record from 2010, and finished in a three-way tie with the Denver Broncos and Oakland Raiders for the AFC West division title, with an 8–8 record, but lost the tiebreaker to the Broncos and missed the playoffs for a second consecutive season. For Norv Turner, this was his fifth season as the head coach of the Chargers. The Chargers had the 18th pick in the 2011 NFL draft.

== Offseason ==
=== Coaching changes ===
On January 11, defensive coordinator Ron Rivera became the new head coach of the Carolina Panthers. That same day, Rich Bisaccia was named the team's new special teams' coach, replacing Steve Crosby, whose contract was not renewed. Three days later (January 14), the team hired former San Francisco 49ers' defensive coordinator Greg Manusky to replace Rivera. Manusky previously served as the Chargers' linebackers coach from 2002 to 2006.

=== Arrivals ===
Position	Player	2010 Team	Contract
LB	Takeo Spikes	San Francisco 49ers	3 years, $9 million
LB	Travis LaBoy	San Francisco 49ers	2 years
SS	Bob Sanders	Indianapolis Colts	1 year

=== Departures ===
Position	Player	2011 Team
RB	Darren Sproles	New Orleans Saints
OLB	Kevin Burnett	Miami Dolphins
LB	Brandon Siler	Kansas City Chiefs

== NFL draft ==
2011 San Diego Chargers draft
Round	Pick	Player	Position	College	Notes
1	18	Corey Liuget	DT	Illinois	
2	50	Marcus Gilchrist	CB	Clemson	
2	61	Jonas Mouton	LB	Michigan	(Note: The team acquired this second-round selection in a March 2010 trade that sent CB Antonio Cromartie to the New York Jets.)
3	82	Vincent Brown	WR	San Diego State	
3	89	Shareece Wright	CB	USC	(Note: The team acquired this third-round selection as part of a March 2010 trade that sent QB Charlie Whitehurst to the Seattle Seahawks.)
6	183	Jordan Todman	RB	Connecticut	
6	201	Stephen Schilling	G	Michigan	(Note: The team traded its fifth-round selection (#149 overall) and a 2010 fifth-round selection to the Philadelphia Eagles in exchange for its 2010 fifth-round selection (#146 overall; used to select DT Cam Thomas).)
7	234	Andrew Gachkar	LB	Missouri	(Note: In September 2010, the team traded its seventh-round selection (#220 overall) to the Dallas Cowboys in exchange for WR Patrick Crayton.)
Made roster † Pro Football Hall of Fame * Made at least one Pro Bowl during career

== Staff ==
San Diego Chargers 2011 staff
Front office: Owner – Alex Spanos; Chairman/president – Dean Spanos; Executive vice president – Michael Spanos; Executive vice president/CEO – A. G. Spanos; Executive vice president/general manager – A. J. Smith; Executive vice president of football operations/assistant general manager – Ed McGuire; Senior executive – Randy Mueller; Director of player personnel – Jimmy Raye; Director of pro scouting – Dennis Abraham; Director of college scouting – John Spanos; Assistant director of pro scouting – Bryan Cox; Assistant director of college scouting – Mike Biehl; Head coaches: Head coach – Norv Turner; Assistant head coach/secondary – Steven Wilks; Offensive coaches: Offensive coordinator – Clarence Shelmon; Quarterbacks – John Ramsdell; Running backs – Ollie Wilson; Wide receivers – Charlie Joiner; Tight ends – Jason Michael; Offensive line – Hal Hunter; Offensive line – Mike Sullivan; Offensive assistant – Steve Gera	Defensive coaches: Defensive coordinator – Greg Manusky; Defensive line – Don Johnson; Linebackers – John Pagano; Assistant linebackers – Greg Williams; Assistant secondary – Cris Dishman; Defensive assistant – Shane Steichen; Special teams coaches: Special teams – Rich Bisaccia; Assistant special teams – Carlos Polk; Strength and conditioning: Strength and conditioning – Jeff Hurd; Assistant strength and conditioning – Vernon Stephens

== Final roster ==
2011 San Diego Chargers roster
Quarterbacks (QB): 17 Philip Rivers; 7 Billy Volek; Running backs (RB): 44 Curtis Brinkley; 22 Jacob Hester FB; 24 Ryan Mathews; 35 Mike Tolbert FB; Wide receivers (WR): 86 Vincent Brown; 12 Patrick Crayton PR; 80 Malcom Floyd; 15 Richard Goodman KR; 83 Vincent Jackson; 13 Bryan Walters; Tight ends (TE): 85 Antonio Gates; 81 Randy McMichael; 82 Kory Sperry	Offensive linemen (OL): 64 Colin Baxter C; 66 Jeromey Clary T; 62 Brandyn Dombrowski T; 78 Jared Gaither T; 69 Tyronne Green G; 61 Nick Hardwick C; 75 Tony Moll G; 70 Stephen Schilling G; 65 Louis Vasquez G; Defensive linemen (DL): 74 Jacques Cesaire DE; 71 Antonio Garay NT; 90 Tommie Harris; 94 Corey Liuget DE; 92 Vaughn Martin DE; 76 Cam Thomas	Linebackers (LB): 98 Antwan Barnes OLB; 91 Everette Brown OLB; 56 Donald Butler ILB; 58 Na'il Diggs ILB; 59 Andrew Gachkar ILB; 53 Darryl Gamble OLB; 99 Travis LaBoy OLB; 95 Shaun Phillips OLB; 51 Takeo Spikes ILB; 96 Nate Triplett ILB; Defensive backs (DB): 20 Antoine Cason CB; 38 Marcus Gilchrist CB; 28 Steve Gregory SS; 33 Dante Hughes CB; 23 Quentin Jammer CB; 27 Paul Oliver SS; 25 Darrell Stuckey FS; 32 Eric Weddle FS; 29 Shareece Wright CB; Special teams (ST): 9 Nick Novak K; 5 Mike Scifres P; 47 Mike Windt LS	Practice squad: 77 Charlie Bryant NT; 40 Shawnbrey McNeal RB; 79 Damik Scafe DE; 37 Traye Simmons CB; 34 Frank Summers FB; 46 Brad Taylor TE; 8 Drew Willy QB; 72 Eric Young G; Reserve: 97 Bront Bird ILB (IR); 93 Luis Castillo DE (IR); 54 Stephen Cooper ILB (IR); 68 Kris Dielman G (IR); 48 Patrick DiMarco FB (IR); 52 Larry English OLB (IR); 10 Nate Kaeding K (IR); 73 Marcus McNeill T (IR); 57 Jonas Mouton ILB (IR); 63 Scott Mruczkowski G/C (IR); 41 Nick Polk FS (IR); 31 Bob Sanders SS (IR); Rookies in italics 52 active, 12 reserve, 8 practice squad

== Preseason ==
=== Schedule ===
Week	Date	Opponent	Result	Record	Game site	NFL.com recap
1	August 11	Seattle Seahawks	L 17–24	0–1	Qualcomm Stadium	Recap
2	August 21	at Dallas Cowboys	W 20–7	1–1	Cowboys Stadium	Recap
3	August 27	at Arizona Cardinals	W 34–31	2–1	University of Phoenix Stadium	Recap
4	September 1	San Francisco 49ers	L 17–20	2–2	Qualcomm Stadium	Recap

== Regular season ==
=== Schedule ===
Week	Date	Opponent	Result	Record	Game site	NFL.com recap
1	September 11	Minnesota Vikings	W 24–17	1–0	Qualcomm Stadium	Recap
2	September 18	at New England Patriots	L 21–35	1–1	Gillette Stadium	Recap
3	September 25	Kansas City Chiefs	W 20–17	2–1	Qualcomm Stadium	Recap
4	October 2	Miami Dolphins	W 26–16	3–1	Qualcomm Stadium	Recap
5	October 9	at Denver Broncos	W 29–24	4–1	Sports Authority Field at Mile High	Recap
6	Bye					
7	October 23	at New York Jets	L 21–27	4–2	MetLife Stadium	Recap
8	October 31	at Kansas City Chiefs	L 20–23 (OT)	4–3	Arrowhead Stadium	Recap
9	November 6	Green Bay Packers	L 38–45	4–4	Qualcomm Stadium	Recap
10	November 10	Oakland Raiders	L 17–24	4–5	Qualcomm Stadium	Recap
11	November 20	at Chicago Bears	L 20–31	4–6	Soldier Field	Recap
12	November 27	Denver Broncos	L 13–16 (OT)	4–7	Qualcomm Stadium	Recap
13	December 5	at Jacksonville Jaguars	W 38–14	5–7	EverBank Field	Recap
14	December 11	Buffalo Bills	W 37–10	6–7	Qualcomm Stadium	Recap
15	December 18	Baltimore Ravens	W 34–14	7–7	Qualcomm Stadium	Recap
16	December 24	at Detroit Lions	L 10–38	7–8	Ford Field	Recap
17	January 1	at Oakland Raiders	W 38–26	8–8	O.co Coliseum	Recap

=== Game summaries ===
==== Week 1: vs. Minnesota Vikings ====
Week One: Minnesota Vikings at San Diego Chargers – Game summary

Quarter	1	2	3	4	Total
Vikings	7	10	0	0	17
Chargers	7	0	7	10	24

at Qualcomm Stadium, San Diego, California

- Date: September 11
- Game time: 1:15 p.m. PDT
- Game weather: 74 °F (23 °C) (Sunny)
- Game attendance: 66,716
- Referee: Terry McAulay
- TV announcers (Fox): Ron Pitts, Jim Mora, Jr. and Drea Avent
- Box score

Game information

First quarter

- MIN – Percy Harvin 103-yard kickoff return (Ryan Longwell kick), 14:45. Vikings 7–0. Drive: 0 plays, 0 yards, 0:15.
- SD – Matt Tolbert 1-yard pass from Philip Rivers, (Mike Scifres kick), 11:38. Tied 7–7. Drive: 3 plays, 6 yards, 1:21.

Second quarter

- MIN – Ryan Longwell 33-yard field goal, 12:56. Vikings 10–7. Drive: 14 plays, 77 yards, 7:34.
- MIN – Michael Jenkins 3-yard pass from Donovan McNabb (Ryan Longwell kick), 9:44. Vikings 17–7. Drive: 3 plays, 51 yards, 1:28.

Third quarter

- SD – Mike Tolbert 7-yard run (Mike Scifres kick), 10:43. Vikings 17–14. Drive: 7 plays, 69 yards, 4:17.

Fourth quarter

- SD – Mike Scifres 40-yard field goal, 10:05. Tied 17–17. Drive: 9 plays, 46 yards, 4:45.
- SD – Mike Tolbert 19-yard pass from Philip Rivers (Mike Scifres kick), 5:01. Chargers 24–17. Drive: 6 plays, 64 yards, 3:10.

Top passers

- MIN – Donovan McNabb – 7/15, 39 yards, TD, INT
- SD – Philip Rivers – 33/48, 335 yards, 2 TD, 2 INT

Top rushers

- MIN – Adrian Peterson – 16 rushes, 98 yards
- SD – Ryan Mathews – 12 rushes, 45 yards

Top receivers

- MIN – Michael Jenkins – 3 receptions, 26 yards, TD
- SD – Antonio Gates – 8 receptions, 74 yards

Coming off their special teams woes in 2010, the Chargers allowed a 103-yard opening kickoff return to Percy Harvin to start the season. Kicker Nate Kaeding suffered a season-ending injury on the play, and punter Mike Scifres assumed place kicking responsibilities for the game. The Chargers outscored the Vikings 10–0 in the fourth quarter to come back and win the game, 24–17. Fullback Mike Tolbert scored three touchdowns, and Philip Rivers completed 33 of 48 passes for 335 yards and two touchdowns. He was also intercepted twice. Scifres kicked a 40-yard field goal, the first of his NFL career, and kicked three PATs. With the win, the Chargers started their season out 1–0.

==== Week 2: at New England Patriots ====
Week Two: San Diego Chargers at New England Patriots – Game summary

Quarter	1	2	3	4	Total
Chargers	7	0	0	14	21
Patriots	7	13	0	15	35

at Gillette Stadium, Foxborough, Massachusetts

- Date: September 18
- Game time: 4:15 p.m. EDT/1:15 pm. PDT
- Game weather: 63 °F (17 °C) (Wind)
- Game attendance: 68,756
- Referee: Walt Anderson
- TV announcers (CBS): Jim Nantz and Phil Simms
- Box score

Game information

First quarter

- NE – Aaron Hernandez 14-yard pass from Tom Brady (Stephen Gostowski kick), 6:16. Patriots 7–0. Drive: 12 plays, 92 yards, 5:47.
- SD – Ryan Mathews 10-yard run (Nick Novak kick), 2:55. Tied 7–7. Drive: 7 plays, 80 yards, 3:21.

Second quarter

- NE – Stephen Gostowski 22-yard field goal, 13:20. Patriots 10–7. Drive: 14 plays, 59 yards, 4:35.
- NE – Rob Gronkowski 10-yard pass from Tom Brady (Stephen Gostowski kick), 2:49. Patriots 17–7. Drive: 10 plays, 99 yards, 5:25.
- NE – Stephen Gostowski 47-yard field goal, 0:00. Patriots 20–7. Drive: 3 plays, 18 yards, 0:09.

Third quarter

- No scoring plays.

Fourth quarter

- SD – Vincent Jackson 3-yard pass from Philip Rivers (Nick Novak kick), 13:33. Patriots 20–14. Drive: 10 plays, 64 yards, 5:03.
- NE – Rob Gronkowski 17-yard pass from Tom Brady (Danny Woodhead run), 8:40. Patriots 28–14. Drive: 4 plays, 61 yards, 1:40.
- SD – Vincent Jackson 26-yard pass from Philip Rivers (Nick Novak kick), 5:40. Patriots 28–21. Drive: 8 plays, 80 yards, 3:00.
- NE – BenJarvus Green-Ellis 16-yard run (Stephen Gostowski kick), 1:54. Patriots 35–21. Drive: 9 plays, 80 yards, 3:46.

Top passers

- SD – Philip Rivers – 29/40, 378 yards, 2 TD, 2 INT
- NE – Tom Brady – 31/40, 423 yards, 3 TD

Top rushers

- SD – Ryan Mathews – 12 rushes, 64 yards, TD
- NE – BenJarvus Green Ellis – 17 rushes, 70 yards, TD

Top receivers

- SD – Vincent Jackson – 10 receptions, 172 yards, 2 TD
- NE – Deion Branch – 8 receptions, 129 yards

With the loss, the Chargers fell to 1–1.

==== Week 3: vs. Kansas City Chiefs ====
Week Three: Kansas City Chiefs at San Diego Chargers – Game summary

Quarter	1	2	3	4	Total
Chiefs	0	0	7	10	17
Chargers	0	10	7	3	20

at Qualcomm Stadium, San Diego, California

- Date: September 25
- Game time: 1:05 pm. PDT
- Game weather: 67 °F (19 °C) (Partly Cloudy)
- Game attendance: 62,236
- Referee: Walt Coleman
- TV announcers (CBS): Ian Eagle and Dan Fouts
- Box score

Game information

First quarter

- No scoring plays.

Second quarter

- SD – Ryan Mathews 2-yard run (Nick Novak kick), 12:45. Chargers 7–0. Drive: 15 plays, 72 yards, 7:07.
- SD – Nick Novak 35-yard field goal, 0:28. Chargers 10–0. Drive: 13 plays, 73 yards, 3:09.

Third quarter

- KC – Dwayne Bowe 4-yard pass from Matt Cassel (Ryan Succop kick), 11:21. Chargers 10–7. Drive: 6 plays, 42 yards, 1:40.
- SD – Ryan Mathews 4-yard run (Nick Novak kick), 7:32. Chargers 17–7. Drive: 7 plays, 80 yards, 3:49.

Fourth quarter

- KC – Ryan Succop 33-yard field goal, 12:57. Chargers 17–10. Drive: 18 plays, 58 yards, 9:35.
- SD – Nick Novak 41-yard field goal, 8:03. Chargers 20–10. Drive: 8 plays, 48 yards, 4:54.
- KC – Leonard Pope 1-yard pass from Matt Cassel (Ryan Succop kick), 4:58. Chargers 20–17. Drive: 9 plays, 80 yards, 3:05.

Top passers

- KC – Matt Cassel – 17/24, 176 yards, 2 TD, INT
- SD – Philip Rivers – 24/38, 266 yards, 2 INT

Top rushers

- KC – Dexter McCluster – 9 rushes, 45 yards
- SD – Ryan Mathews – 21 rushes, 98 yards, 2 TD

Top receivers

- KC – Dexter McCluster – 5 receptions, 17 yards
- SD – Vincent Jackson – 5 receptions, 63 yards

With the win, the Chargers improved to 2–1.

==== Week 4: vs. Miami Dolphins ====
Week Four: Miami Dolphins at San Diego Chargers – Game summary

Quarter	1	2	3	4	Total
Dolphins	7	3	3	3	16
Chargers	7	6	10	3	26

at Qualcomm Stadium, San Diego, California

- Date: October 2
- Game time: 1:15 pm. PDT
- Game weather: 84 °F (29 °C) (Sunny)
- Game attendance: 63,002
- Referee: Jeff Triplette
- TV announcers (CBS): Ian Eagle and Dan Fouts (blacked out locally)
- Box score

Game information

First quarter

- MIA – Lex Hilliard 1-yard run (Dan Carpenter kick), 2:47. Dolphins 7–0. Drive: 11 plays, 92 yards, 5:37.
- SD – Vincent Jackson 55-yard pass from Philip Rivers (Nick Novak kick), 1:35. Tied 7–7. Drive: 3 plays, 80 yards, 1:12.

Second quarter

- SD – Nick Novak 27-yard field goal, 7:55. Chargers 10–7. Drive: 9 plays, 67 yards, 4:43.
- MIA – Dan Carpenter 41-yard field goal, 1:48. Tied 10–10. Drive: 4 plays, 2 yards, 1:11.
- SD – Nick Novak 48-yard field goal, 0:07. Chargers 13–10. Drive: 8 plays, 50 yards, 1:41.

Third quarter

- SD – Mike Tolbert 1-yard run (Nick Novak kick), 9:24. Chargers 20–10. Drive: 8 plays, 54 yards, 4:29.
- MIA – Dan Carpenter 37-yard field goal, 6:46. Chargers 20–13. Drive: 8 plays, 61 yards, 2:38.
- SD – Nick Novak 23-yard field goal, 1:15. Chargers 23–13. Drive: 9 plays, 79 yards, 5:31.

Fourth quarter

- MIA – Dan Carpenter 51-yard field goal, 11:34. Chargers 23–16. Drive: 11 plays, 46 yards, 4:41.
- SD – Nick Novak 38-yard field goal, 4:28. Chargers 26–16. Drive: 13 plays, 60 yards, 7:06.

Top passers

- MIA – Matt Moore – 17/26, 167 yards, INT
- SD – Philip Rivers – 21/31, 307 yards, TD

Top rushers

- MIA – Reggie Bush – 13 rushes, 50 yards
- SD – Ryan Mathews – 16 rushes, 81 yards

Top receivers

- MIA – Brandon Marshall – 5 receptions, 52 yards
- SD – Ryan Mathews – 5 receptions, 68 yards

With the win, the Chargers improved to 3–1.

==== Week 5: at Denver Broncos ====
Week Five: San Diego Chargers at Denver Broncos – Game summary

Quarter	1	2	3	4	Total
Chargers	6	17	0	6	29
Broncos	7	3	0	14	24

at Sports Authority Field at Mile High, Denver, Colorado

- Date: October 9
- Game time: 2:15 p.m. MDT/1:15 pm. PDT
- Game weather: 52 °F (11 °C) (Mostly Sunny)
- Game attendance: 74,895
- Referee: Gene Steratore
- TV announcers (CBS): Marv Albert and Rich Gannon
- Box score

Game information

First quarter

- SD – Nick Novak 24-yard field goal, 8:37. Chargers 7–0. Drive: 9 plays, 46 yards, 4:54.
- DEN – Cassius Vaughn 55-yard interception return (Matt Prater kick), 5:58. Broncos 7–3.
- SD – Nick Novak 32-yard field goal, 0:45. Broncos 7–6. Drive: 10 plays, 66 yards, 5:13.

Second quarter

- DEN – Matt Prater 35-yard field goal, 11:10. Broncos 10–6. Drive: 11 plays, 63 yards, 4:35.
- SD – Philip Rivers 2-yard run (Nick Novak kick), 7:19. Chargers 13–10. Drive: 7 plays, 80 yards, 3:51.
- SD – Nick Novak 28-yard field goal, 1:47. Chargers 16–10. Drive: 8 plays, 56 yards, 3:42.
- SD – Malcom Floyd 42-yard pass from Philip Rivers (Nick Novak kick), 0:13. Chargers 23–10. Drive: 5 plays, 54 yards, 0:49.

Third quarter

- No scoring plays.

Fourth quarter

- SD – Nick Novak 51-yard field goal, 13:35. Chargers 26–10. Drive: 9 plays, 30 yards, 4:13.
- DEN – Tim Tebow 12-yard run (Willis McGahee run), 6:35. Chargers 26–18. Drive: 4 plays, 51 yards, 1:19.
- DEN – Knowshon Moreno 28-yard pass from Tim Tebow (pass failed), 3:19. Chargers 26–24. Drive: 3 plays, 41 yards, 1:19.
- SD – Nick Novak 35-yard field goal, 0:24. Chargers 29–24. Drive: 9 plays, 63 yards, 2:55.

Top passers

- SD – Philip Rivers – 18/29, 250 yards, TD, INT
- DEN – Tim Tebow – 4/10, 79 yards, TD

Top rushers

- SD – Ryan Mathews – 24 rushes, 125 yards
- DEN – Willis McGahee – 16 rushes, 125 yards

Top receivers

- SD – Malcom Floyd – 3 receptions, 100 yards, TD
- DEN – Daniel Fells – 3 receptions, 47 yards

With the win, the Chargers went into their bye week at 4–1. The team also managed to get their best start after five games under head coach Norv Turner.

==== Week 7: at New York Jets ====
Week Seven: San Diego Chargers at New York Jets – Game summary

Quarter	1	2	3	4	Total
Chargers	7	14	0	0	21
Jets	3	7	7	10	27

at MetLife Stadium, East Rutherford, New Jersey

- Date: October 23
- Game time: 1:00 pm. EDT/10:00 am. PDT
- Game weather: 58 °F (14 °C) (Sunny)
- Game attendance: 79,088
- Referee: Ron Winter
- TV announcers (CBS): Jim Nantz and Phil Simms
- Box score

Game information

First quarter

- SD – Donald Butler 37-yard fumble return (Nick Novak kick), 13:11. Chargers 7–0.
- NYJ – Nick Folk 35-yard field goal, 8:25. Chargers 7–3. Drive: 8 plays, 64 yards, 4:46.

Second quarter

- SD – Antonio Gates 2-yard pass from Philip Rivers (Nick Novak kick), 12:11. Chargers 14–3. Drive: 14 plays, 76 yards, 6:28.
- NYJ – Plaxico Burress 3-yard pass from Mark Sanchez (Nick Folk kick), 7:18. Chargers 14–10. Drive: 8 plays, 77 yards, 4:53.
- SD – Mike Tolbert 1-yard run (Nick Novak kick), 1:16. Chargers 21–10. Drive: 11 plays, 87 yards, 6:02.

Third quarter

- NYJ – Plaxico Burress 4-yard pass from Mark Sanchez (Nick Folk kick), 2:57. Chargers 21–17. Drive: 10 plays, 55 yards, 4:33.

Fourth quarter

- NYJ – Plaxico Burress 3-yard pass from Mark Sanchez (Nick Folk kick), 8:41. Jets 24–21. Drive: 5 plays, 19 yards, 2:15.
- NYJ – Nick Folk 30-yard field goal, 1:36. Jets 27–21. Drive: 9 plays, 35 yards, 3:47.

Top passers

- SD – Philip Rivers – 16/32, 179 yards, TD, 2 INT
- NYJ – Mark Sanchez – 18/33, 172 yards, 3 TD, INT

Top rushers

- SD – Mike Tolbert – 11 rushes, 58 yards, TD
- NYJ – Shonn Greene – 20 rushes, 112 yards

Top receivers

- SD – Antonio Gates – 5 receptions, 54 yards, TD
- NYJ – Dustin Keller – 4 receptions, 53 yards

With the loss, the Chargers fell to 4–2.

==== Week 8: at Kansas City Chiefs ====
Week Eight: San Diego Chargers at Kansas City Chiefs – Game summary

Quarter	1	2	3	4	OT	Total
Chargers	0	3	9	8	0	20
Chiefs	10	3	0	7	3	23

at Arrowhead Stadium, Kansas City, Missouri

- Date: October 31
- Game time: 7:30 p.m. CDT/5:30 pm. PDT
- Game weather: 63 °F (17 °C) (Clear)
- Game attendance: 72,733
- Referee: Alberto Riveron
- TV announcers (ESPN): Mike Tirico, Ron Jaworski, Jon Gruden and Rachel Nichols
- Box score

Game information

First quarter

- KC – Ryan Succop 36-yard field goal, 9:04. Chiefs 3–0. Drive: 10 plays, 49 yards, 4:46.
- KC – Jonathan Baldwin 39-yard pass from Matt Cassel (Ryan Succop kick), 2:51. Chiefs 10–0. Drive: 4 plays, 77 yards, 2:01.

Second quarter

- SD – Nick Novak 44-yard field goal, 8:31. Chiefs 10–3. Drive: 6 plays, 46 yards, 3:04.
- KC – Ryan Succop 47-yard field goal, 0:03. Chiefs 13–3. Drive: 6 plays, 29 yards, 1:08.

Third quarter

- SD – Nick Novak 44-yard field goal, 8:10. Chiefs 13–6. Drive: 10 plays, 62 yards, 5:28.
- SD – Nick Novak 42-yard field goal, 6:01. Chiefs 13–9. Drive: 4 plays, 4 yards, 1:45.
- SD – Nick Novak 26-yard field goal, 1:45. Chiefs 13–12. Drive: 7 plays, 54 yards, 2:05.

Fourth quarter

- KC – Jackie Battle 1-yard run (Ryan Succop kick), 12:01. Chiefs 20–12. Drive: 10 plays, 74 yards, 4:44.
- SD – Curtis Brinkley 2-yard run (Curtis Brinkley pass from Philip Rivers), 7:11. Tied 20–20. Drive: 10 plays, 80 yards, 4:50.

Overtime

- KC – Ryan Succop 30-yard field goal, 5:16. Chiefs 23–20. Drive: 14 plays, 69 yards, 7:28.

Top passers

- SD – Philip Rivers – 26/41, 369 yards, 2 INT
- KC – Matt Cassel – 19/32, 261 yards, TD, 2 INT

Top rushers

- SD – Ryan Mathews – 13 rushes, 57 yards
- KC – Jackie Battle – 19 rushes, 70 yards, TD

Top receivers

- SD – Malcom Floyd – 5 receptions, 107 yards
- KC – Jonathan Baldwin – 5 receptions, 82 yards, TD

Late in the 4th quarter, with the game tied at 20, Philip Rivers fumbled the ball while kneeling to set up the potential game-winning field goal. This play effectively ended the Chargers chances at the division, as had they won, they would've finished 9-7 and won the division. With the loss, the Chargers fell to 4–3.

==== Week 9: vs. Green Bay Packers ====
Week Nine: Green Bay Packers at San Diego Chargers – Game summary

Quarter	1	2	3	4	Total
Packers	21	7	3	14	45
Chargers	7	10	7	14	38

at Qualcomm Stadium, San Diego, California

- Date: November 6
- Game time: 1:15 pm. PST
- Game weather: 53 °F (12 °C) (Rain)
- Game attendance: 68,908
- Referee: Clete Blakeman
- TV announcers (Fox): Thom Brennaman, Brian Billick, & Laura Okmin
- Box score

Game information

First quarter

- SD – Vincent Jackson 23-yard pass from Philip Rivers (Nick Novak kick), 10:32. Chargers 7–0. Drive: 8 plays, 80 yards, 4:28.
- GB – Jermichael Finley 5-yard pass from Aaron Rodgers (Mason Crosby kick), 5:40. Tied 7–7. Drive: 8 plays, 63 yards, 4:52.
- GB – Charlie Peprah 40-yard interception return (Mason Crosby kick), 4:33. Packers 14–7.
- GB – Tramon Williams 43-yard interception return (Mason Crosby kick), 1:52. Packers 21–7.

Second quarter

- SD – Mike Tolbert 8-yard run (Nick Novak kick), 14:08. Packers 21–14. Drive: 6 plays, 66 yards, 2:44.
- SD – Nick Novak 52-yard field goal, 5:48. Packers 21–17. Drive: 10 plays, 30 yards, 4:19.
- GB – Jordy Nelson 16-yard pass from Aaron Rodgers (Mason Crosby kick), 0:18. Packers 28–17. Drive: 12 plays, 74 yards, 5:30.

Third quarter

- GB – Mason Crosby 47-yard field goal, 8:25. Packers 31–17. Drive: 11 plays, 51 yards, 6:35.
- SD – Antonio Gates 11-yard pass from Philip Rivers (Nick Novak kick), 1:58. Packers 31–24. Drive: 12 plays, 84 yards, 6:27.

Fourth quarter

- GB – James Jones 21-yard pass from Aaron Rodgers (Mason Crosby kick), 13:00. Packers 38–24. Drive: 7 plays, 73 yards, 3:58.
- GB – Greg Jennings 4-yard pass from Aaron Rodgers (Mason Crosby kick), 10:27. Packers 45–24. Drive: 3 plays, 68 yards, 1:04.
- SD – Vincent Jackson 5-yard pass from Philip Rivers (Nick Novak kick), 7:32. Packers 45–31. Drive: 7 plays, 80 yards, 2:55.
- SD – Vincent Jackson 29-yard pass from Philip Rivers (Nick Novak kick), 6:25. Packers 45–38. Drive: 3 plays, 55 yards, 1:07.

Top passers

- GB – Aaron Rodgers – 21/26, 247 yards, 4 TD
- SD – Philip Rivers – 26/46, 385 yards, 4 TD, 3 INT

Top rushers

- GB – James Starks – 13 rushes, 66 yards
- SD – Mike Tolbert – 19 rushes, 83 yards, TD

Top receivers

- GB – Jordy Nelson – 5 receptions, 105 yards, TD
- SD – Vincent Jackson – 7 receptions, 141 yards, 3 TD

With the loss, the Chargers fell to 4–4.

==== Week 10: vs. Oakland Raiders ====
Week Ten: Oakland Raiders at San Diego Chargers – Game summary

Quarter	1	2	3	4	Total
Raiders	7	10	7	0	24
Chargers	3	0	14	0	17

at Qualcomm Stadium, San Diego, California

- Date: November 10
- Game time: 5:20 pm. PST
- Game weather: 69 °F (21 °C) (Clear)
- Game attendance: 68,109
- Referee: Ed Hochuli
- TV announcers (NFLN): Brad Nessler, Mike Mayock and Alex Flanagan
- Box score

Game information

First quarter

- SD – Nick Novak 20-yard field goal, 10:40. Chargers 3–0. Drive: 6 plays, 38 yards, 3:09.
- OAK – Michael Bush 2-yard run (Sebastian Janikowski kick), 0:41. Raiders 7–3. Drive: 11 plays, 86 yards, 6:25.

Second quarter

- OAK – Sebastian Janikowski 23-yard field goal, 11:02. Raiders 10–3. Drive: 7 plays, 70 yards, 3:25.
- OAK – Denarius Moore 3-yard pass from Carson Palmer (Sebastian Janikowski kick), 1:51. Raiders 17–3. Drive: 2 plays, 56 yards, 0:31.

Third quarter

- SD – Vincent Brown 30-yard pass from Philip Rivers (Nick Novak kick), 11:48. Raiders 17–10. Drive: 8 plays, 80 yards, 3:12.
- OAK – Denarius Moore 26-yard pass from Carson Palmer (Sebastian Janikowski kick), 9:01. Raiders 24–10. Drive: 5 plays, 85 yards, 2:47.
- SD – Jacob Hester 7-yard pass from Philip Rivers (Nick Novak kick), 0:00. Raiders 24–17. Drive: 7 plays, 51 yards, 2:06.

Fourth quarter

- No scoring plays.

Top passers

- OAK – Carson Palmer – 14/20, 299 yards, 2 TD, INT
- SD – Philip Rivers – 23/47, 274 yards, 2 TD, INT

Top rushers

- OAK – Michael Bush – 30 rushes, 157 yards, TD
- SD – Mike Tolbert – 7 rushes, 36 yards

Top receivers

- OAK – Denarius Moore – 5 receptions, 123 yards, 2 TD
- SD – Vincent Brown – 5 receptions, 97 yards, TD

Trying to snap a three-game losing streak, the Chargers stayed at home for a Week 10 AFC West duel with the Oakland Raiders on Thursday night. San Diego struck first in the opening quarter with a 20-yard field goal from kicker Nick Novak, but the Raiders answered with running back Michael Bush getting a 2-yard touchdown run. Oakland added onto their lead in the second quarter with kicker Sebastian Janikowski getting a 23-yard field goal, followed by quarterback Carson Palmer completing a 33-yard touchdown pass to wide receiver Denarius Moore.

The Chargers began the third quarter with quarterback Philip Rivers finding rookie wide receiver Vincent Brown on a 30-yard touchdown pass, but the Raiders struck back with Palmer completing a 26-yard touchdown pass to Moore. Afterwards, San Diego closed out the quarter with Rivers hooking up with fullback Jacob Hester on a 7-yard touchdown pass. The Chargers tried to rally in the fourth quarter, but Oakland's defense held on to preserve the win.

Win the loss, not only did San Diego fall to 4–5, but it marked the first time since 2003 that the Chargers had lost four-straight.

==== Week 11: at Chicago Bears ====
Week Eleven: San Diego Chargers at Chicago Bears – Game summary

Quarter	1	2	3	4	Total
Chargers	3	7	7	3	20
Bears	3	14	14	0	31

at Soldier Field, Chicago, Illinois

- Date: November 20
- Game time: 3:15 pm. CST/1:15 pm. PST
- Game weather: 42 °F (6 °C) (Cloudy, winds gusting to 20 mph (32 km/h))
- Game attendance: 62,344
- Referee: Jeff Triplette
- TV announcers (CBS): Jim Nantz and Phil Simms
- Box score

Game information

First quarter

- SD – Nick Novak 28-yard field goal, 9:40. Chargers 3–0. Drive: 6 plays, 47 yards, 3:45.
- CHI – Robbie Gould 42-yard field goal, 5:01. Tied 3–3. Drive: 9 plays, 62 yards, 4:39.

Second quarter

- CHI – Marion Barber 1-yard run (Robbie Gould kick), 4:09. Bears 10–3. Drive: 5 plays, 41 yards, 2:26.
- SD – Antonio Gates 8-yard pass from Philip Rivers (Nick Novak kick), 2:04. Tied 10–10. Drive: 7 plays, 78 yards, 2:05.
- CHI – Kellen Davis 4-yard pass from Jay Cutler (Robbie Gould kick), 0:20. Bears 17–10. Drive: 6 plays, 44 yards, 1:44.

Third quarter

- SD – Vincent Jackson 5-yard pass from Philip Rivers (Nick Novak kick), 10:58. Tied 17–17. Drive: 6 plays, 76 yards, 4:02.
- CHI – Jay Cutler 1-yard run (Robbie Gould kick), 5:47. Bears 24–17. Drive: 8 plays, 83 yards, 5:11.
- CHI – Johnny Knox 24-yard pass from Jay Cutler (Robbie Gould kick), 4:53. Bears 31–17. Drive: 2 plays, 37 yards, 0:39.

Fourth quarter

- SD – Nick Novak 48-yard field goal, 14:55. Bears 31–20. Drive: 8 plays, 51 yards, 4:58.

Top passers

- SD – Philip Rivers – 21/31, 280 yards, 2 TD, 2 INT
- CHI – Jay Cutler – 18/31, 286 yards, 2 TD, INT

Top rushers

- SD – Ryan Mathews – 13 rushes, 37 yards
- CHI – Matt Forte – 20 rushes, 57 yards

Top receivers

- SD – Vincent Jackson – 7 receptions, 165 yards, TD
- CHI – Johnny Knox – 3 receptions, 97 yards, TD

With the loss, the Chargers fell to 4–6 and lost 5 in a row for the first time since 2003.

==== Week 12: vs. Denver Broncos ====
Week Twelve: Denver Broncos at San Diego Chargers – Game summary

Quarter	1	2	3	4	OT	Total
Broncos	0	7	3	3	3	16
Chargers	3	7	3	0	0	13

at Qualcomm Stadium, San Diego, California

- Date: November 27
- Game time: 1:15 pm. PST
- Game weather: 84 °F (29 °C) (Sunny)
- Game attendance: 64,436
- Referee: Jeff Triplette
- TV announcers (CBS): Ian Eagle and Dan Fouts
- Box score

Game information

First quarter

- SD – Nick Novak 53-yard field goal, 11:34. Chargers 3–0. Drive: 9 plays, 45 yards, 3:26.

Second quarter

- SD – Antonio Gates 6-yard pass from Philip Rivers (Nick Novak kick), 7:58. Chargers 10–0. Drive: 15 plays, 91 yards, 8:47.
- DEN – Eric Decker 18-yard pass from Tim Tebow (Matt Prater kick), 0:55. Chargers 10–7. Drive: 4 plays, 46 yards, 0:32.

Third quarter

- SD – Nick Novak 25-yard field goal, 9:30. Chargers 13–7. Drive: 8 plays, 48 yards, 3:48.
- DEN – Matt Prater 41-yard field goal, 0:33. Chargers 13–10. Drive: 11 plays, 57 yards, 6:08.

Fourth quarter

- DEN – Matt Prater 24-yard field goal, 1:34. Tied 13–13. Drive: 9 plays, 68 yards, 3:53.

Overtime

- DEN – Matt Prater 37-yard field goal, 0:29. Broncos 16–13. Drive: 6 plays, 38 yards, 2:02.

Top passers

- DEN – Tim Tebow – 9/18, 143 yards, TD
- SD – Philip Rivers – 19/36, 188 yards, TD

Top rushers

- DEN – Willis McGahee – 23 rushes, 117 yards
- SD – Ryan Mathews – 22 rushes, 137 yards

Top receivers

- DEN – Eric Decker – 3 receptions, 65 yards, TD
- SD – Vincent Brown – 3 receptions, 50 yards

The loss was the sixth consecutive for the Chargers, their longest such streak in 10 years which took their record down to 4–7.

==== Week 13: at Jacksonville Jaguars ====
Week Thirteen: San Diego Chargers at Jacksonville Jaguars – Game summary

Quarter	1	2	3	4	Total
Chargers	10	14	7	7	38
Jaguars	0	14	0	0	14

at EverBank Field, Jacksonville, Florida

- Date: December 5
- Game time: 8:30 pm. EST/5:30 pm. PST
- Game weather: 67 °F (19 °C) (Clear)
- Game attendance: 62,743
- Referee: Walt Anderson
- TV announcers (ESPN): Mike Tirico, Ron Jaworski, Jon Gruden and Sal Paolantonio
- Box score

Game information

First quarter

- SD – Mike Tolbert 13-yard run (Nick Novak kick), 6:51. Chargers 7–0. Drive: 11 plays, 70 yards, 6:05.
- SD – Nick Novak 29-yard field goal, 0:41. Chargers 10–0. Drive: 8 plays, 52 yards, 4:37.

Second quarter

- JAC – Maurice Jones-Drew 9-yard pass from Blaine Gabbert (Josh Scobee kick), 7:55. Chargers 10–7. Drive: 12 plays, 79 yards, 7:46.
- JAC – Cecil Shorts 5-yard pass from Blaine Gabbert Josh Scobee kick), 2:32. Jaguars 14–10. Drive: 7 plays, 70 yards, 3:42.
- SD – Vincent Brown 22-yard pass from Philip Rivers (Nick Novak kick), 1:26. Chargers 17–14. Drive: 8 plays, 68 yards, 1:06.
- SD – Vincent Jackson 35-yard pass from Philip Rivers (Nick Novak kick), 0:16. Chargers 24–14. Drive: 3 plays, 59 yards, 0:37.

Third quarter

- SD – Malcom Floyd 52-yard pass from Philip Rivers (Nick Novak kick), 12:04. Chargers 31–14. Drive: 5 plays, 80 yards, 2:56.

Fourth quarter

- SD – Ryan Mathews 31-yard run (Nick Novak kick), 12:04. Chargers 38–14. Drive: 1 play, 31 yards, 0:09.

Top passers

- SD – Philip Rivers – 22/28, 294 yards, 3 TD
- JAC – Blaine Gabbert – 19/33, 195 yards, 2 TD, INT

Top rushers

- SD – Ryan Mathews – 13 rushes, 112 yards, TD
- JAC – Maurice Jones-Drew – 20 rushes, 97 yards

Top receivers

- SD – Malcom Floyd – 4 receptions, 108 yards, TD
- JAC – Maurice Jones-Drew – 6 receptions, 91 yards, TD

Hoping to snap a six-game losing streak, the Chargers flew to EverBank Field for a Week 13 Monday night duel with the Jacksonville Jaguars. San Diego delivered the game's opening punch with a 13-yard touchdown run from running back Mike Tolbert, followed by a 29-yard field goal from kicker Nick Novak. The Jaguars would answer in the second quarter with quarterback Blaine Gabbert completing a 9-yard touchdown pass to running back Maurice Jones-Drew and a 5-yard touchdown pass to wide receiver Cecil Shorts, yet the Chargers replied with quarterback Philip Rivers connecting with rookie wide receiver Vincent Brown on a 22-yard touchdown pass and a 35-yard touchdown pass to wide receiver Vincent Jackson.

San Diego added onto its lead in the third quarter with Rivers hooking up with wide receiver Malcom Floyd on a 52-yard touchdown pass. Afterwards, the Bolts would pull away in the fourth quarter with a 31-yard touchdown run from running back Ryan Mathews.

With the win, the Chargers improved to 5–7.

==== Week 14: vs. Buffalo Bills ====
Week Fourteen: Buffalo Bills at San Diego Chargers – Game summary

Quarter	1	2	3	4	Total
Bills	0	0	10	0	10
Chargers	7	9	14	7	37

at Qualcomm Stadium, San Diego, California

- Date: December 11
- Game time: 1:15 pm. PST
- Game weather: 59 °F (15 °C) (Cloudy)
- Game attendance: 62,494
- Referee: Gene Steratore
- TV announcers (CBS): Kevin Harlan and Solomon Wilcots (blacked out locally)
- Box score

Game information

First quarter

- SD – Antonio Gates 9-yard pass from Philip Rivers (Nick Novak kick), 7:52. Chargers 7–0. Drive: 12 plays, 80 yards, 7:08.

Second quarter

- SD – Mike Tolbert 1-yard run (kick failed), 14:16. Chargers 13–0. Drive: 10 plays, 55 yards, 5:33.
- SD – Nick Novak 47-yard field goal, 6:41. Chargers 16–0. Drive: 6 plays, 46 yards, 2:29.

Third quarter

- BUF – Dave Rayner 37-yard field goal, 11:43. Chargers 16–3. Drive: 8 plays, 60 yards, 3:17.
- BUF – Bryan Scott fumble recovery in end zone (Dave Rayner kick), 10:11. Chargers 16–10.
- SD – Antonio Gates 2-yard pass from Philip Rivers (Nick Novak kick), 4:11. Chargers 23–10. Drive: 11 plays, 78 yards, 6:00.
- SD – Steve Gregory 26-yard interception return (Nick Novak kick), 4:02. Chargers 30–10.

Fourth quarter

- SD – Patrick Crayton 26-yard pass from Philip Rivers (Nick Novak kick), 9:01. Chargers 37–10. Drive: 11 plays, 77 yards, 7:05.

Top passers

- BUF – Ryan Fitzpatrick – 13/34, 176 yards, 2 INT
- SD – Philip Rivers – 24/33, 240 yards, 3 TD

Top rushers

- BUF – C. J. Spiller – 12 rushes, 46 yards
- SD – Ryan Mathews – 20 rushes, 114 yards

Top receivers

- BUF – Stevie Johnson – 4 receptions, 116 yards
- SD – Antonio Gates – 7 receptions, 68 yards, 2 TD

With the win, the Chargers improved to 6–7.

==== Week 15: vs. Baltimore Ravens ====
Week Fifteen: Baltimore Ravens at San Diego Chargers – Game summary

Quarter	1	2	3	4	Total
Ravens	0	7	0	7	14
Chargers	7	10	14	3	34

at Qualcomm Stadium, San Diego, California

- Date: December 18
- Game time: 5:20 pm. PST
- Game weather: 58 °F (14 °C) (Cloudy)
- Game attendance: 67,242
- Referee: Carl Cheffers
- TV announcers (NBC): Al Michaels, Cris Collinsworth and Michele Tafoya
- Box score

Game information

First quarter

- SD – Mike Tolbert 2-yard run (Nick Novak kick), 4:47. Chargers 7–0. Drive: 12 plays, 74 yards, 7:04.

Second quarter

- BAL – Ed Dickson 15-yard pass from Joe Flacco (Billy Cundiff kick), 13:27. Tied 7–7. Drive: 13 plays, 75 yards, 6:20.
- SD – Nick Novak 45-yard field goal, 7:44. Chargers 10–7. Drive: 9 plays, 53 yards, 5:43.
- SD – Ryan Mathews 1-yard run (Nick Novak kick), 0:19. Chargers 17–7. Drive: 7 plays, 80 yards, 2:52.

Third quarter

- SD – Malcom Floyd 28-yard pass from Philip Rivers (Nick Novak kick), 10:38. Chargers 24–7. Drive: 8 plays, 80 yards, 4:22.
- SD – Ryan Mathews 3-yard run (Nick Novak kick), 4:05. Chargers 31–7. Drive: 5 plays, 42 yards, 2:16.

Fourth quarter

- SD – Nick Novak 28-yard field goal, 4:28. Chargers 34–7. Drive: 14 plays, 89 yards, 9:14.
- BAL – Torrey Smith 36-yard pass from Joe Flacco (Billy Cundiff kick), 1:55. Chargers 34–14. Drive: 8 plays, 55 yards, 2:33.

Top passers

- BAL – Joe Flacco – 23/34, 226 yards, 2 TD, 2 INT
- SD – Philip Rivers – 17/23, 270 yards, TD

Top rushers

- BAL – Ray Rice – 10 rushes, 57 yards
- SD – Ryan Mathews – 26 rushes, 90 yards, 2 TD

Top receivers

- BAL – Torrey Smith – 6 receptions, 77 yards, TD
- SD – Malcom Floyd – 5 receptions, 96 yards, TD

With the win, the Chargers improved to 7–7. Qualcomm Stadium was renamed Snapdragon Stadium as a promotion for Qualcomm's Snapdragon brand.

==== Week 16: at Detroit Lions ====
Week Sixteen: San Diego Chargers at Detroit Lions – Game summary

Quarter	1	2	3	4	Total
Chargers	0	0	10	0	10
Lions	10	14	7	7	38

at Ford Field, Detroit, Michigan

- Date: December 24
- Game time: 4:05 pm. EST/1:05 pm. PST
- Game weather: Played indoors (domed stadium)
- Game attendance: 62,469
- Referee: Ed Hochuli
- TV announcers (CBS): Greg Gumbel and Dan Dierdorf
- Box score

Game information

First quarter

- DET – Brandon Pettigrew 7-yard pass from Matthew Stafford (Jason Hanson kick), 10:52. Lions 7–0. Drive: 9 plays, 74 yards, 4:08.
- DET – Jason Hanson 50-yard field goal, 0:33. Lions 10–0. Drive: 13 plays, 65 yards, 6:30.

Second quarter

- DET – Kevin Smith 3-yard pass from Matthew Stafford (Jason Hanson kick), 7:11. Lions 17–0. Drive: 11 plays, 87 yards, 5:16.
- DET – Calvin Johnson 14-yard pass from Matthew Stafford (Jason Hanson kick), 0:31. Lions 24–0. Drive: 9 plays, 74 yards, 4:22.

Third quarter

- SD – Malcom Floyd 11-yard pass from Philip Rivers (Nick Novak kick), 8:38. Lions 24–7. Drive: 5 plays, 57 yards, 2:04.
- SD – Nick Novak 22-yard field goal, 4:53. Lions 24–10. Drive: 10 plays, 43 yards, 3:45.
- DET – Kevin Smith 6-yard run (Jason Hanson kick), 0:16. Lions 31–10. Drive: 9 plays, 80 yards, 4;37.

Fourth quarter

- DET – Cliff Avril 4-yard interception return (Jason Hanson Kick), 2:28. Lions 38–10.

Top passers

- SD – Philip Rivers – 28/53, 299 yards, TD, 2 INT
- DET – Matthew Stafford – 29/36, 373 yards, 3 TD

Top rushers

- SD – Ryan Mathews – 11 rushes, 58 yards
- DET – Kevin Smith – 15 rushes, 49 yards, TD

Top receivers

- SD – Malcolm Floyd – 6 receptions, 95 yards, TD
- DET – Calvin Johnson – 4 receptions, 102 yards, TD

With the loss, the Chargers fell to 7–8.

==== Week 17: at Oakland Raiders ====
Week Seventeen: San Diego Chargers at Oakland Raiders – Game summary

Quarter	1	2	3	4	Total
Chargers	7	17	7	7	38
Raiders	7	6	6	7	26

at O.co Coliseum, Oakland, California

- Date: January 1
- Game time: 1:15 pm. PST
- Game weather: 56 °F (13 °C) (Clear)
- Game attendance: 58,721
- Referee: Clete Blakeman
- TV announcers (CBS): Marv Albert & Rich Gannon
- Box score

Game information

First quarter

- OAK – Darrius Heyward-Bey 3-yard pass from Carson Palmer (Sebastian Janikowski kick), 7:20. Raiders 7–0. Drive: 12 plays, 95 yards, 5:49.
- SD – Antonio Gates 38-yard pass from Philip Rivers (Nick Novak kick), 1:02. Tied 7–7. Drive: 10 plays, 81 yards, 6:18.

Second quarter

- SD – Mike Tolbert 1-yard run (Nick Novak kick), 10:26. Chargers 14–7. Drive: 6 plays, 80 yards, 2:35.
- OAK – Sebastian Janikowski 52-yard field goal, 6:19. Chargers 14–10. Drive: 9 plays, 46 yards, 4:07.
- SD – Richard Goodman 105-yard kickoff return (Nick Novak kick), 6:06. Chargers 21–10. Drive: 0 plays, 0 yards, 0:13.
- OAK – Sebastian Janikowski 43-yard field goal, 2:19. Chargers 21–13. Drive: 10 plays, 54 yards, 3:47.
- SD – Nick Novak 51-yard field goal, 0:46. Chargers 24–13. Drive: 9 plays, 47 yards, 1:33.

Third quarter

- OAK – Sebastian Janikowski 27-yard field goal, 13:18. Chargers 24–16. Drive: 6 plays, 85 yards, 1:42.
- SD – Vincent Jackson 13-yard pass from Philip Rivers (Nick Novak kick), 7:33. Chargers 31–16. Drive: 9 plays, 66 yards, 5:45.
- OAK – Sebastian Janikowski 32-yard field goal, 1:18. Chargers 31–19. Drive: 12 plays, 66 yards, 6:15.

Fourth quarter

- OAK – Kevin Boss 22-yard pass from Carson Palmer (Sebastian Janikowski kick), 9:37. Chargers 31–26. Drive: 3 plays, 65 yards, 1:28.
- SD – Malcom Floyd 43-yard pass from Philip Rivers (Nick Novak kick), 6:48. Chargers 38–26. Drive: 4 plays, 99 yards, 2:49.

Top passers

- SD – Philip Rivers – 19/26, 310 yards, 3 TD, INT
- OAK – Carson Palmer – 28/43, 417 yards, 2 TD, INT

Top rushers

- SD – Mike Tolbert – 9 rushes, 58 yards, TD
- OAK – Michael Bush – 19 rushes, 66 yards

Top receivers

- SD – Malcom Floyd – 7 receptions, 127 yards, TD
- OAK – Darrius Heyward-Bey – 9 receptions, 130 yards, TD

With the win, the Chargers wrapped up their season at 8–8 and snapped their three-game losing streak against the Raiders.

=== Standings ===
AFC West
	W	L	T	PCT	DIV	CONF	PF	PA	STK
^{(4)} Denver Broncos	8	8	0	.500	3–3	6–6	309	390	L3
San Diego Chargers	8	8	0	.500	3–3	7–5	406	377	W1
Oakland Raiders	8	8	0	.500	3–3	6–6	359	433	L1
Kansas City Chiefs	7	9	0	.438	3–3	4–8	212	338	W1
