= 2011 Oakland Raiders season =

52nd season in franchise history

- Owner: Al Davis (until death); Mark Davis (after October 8)
- Head coach: Hue Jackson
- Home stadium: O.co Coliseum

Results
- Record: 8–8
- Division place: 3rd AFC West
- Playoffs: Did not qualify
- Pro Bowlers: DT Richard Seymour; P Shane Lechler; K Sebastian Janikowski; LS Jon Condo

The 2011 season was the Oakland Raiders' 42nd in the National Football League (NFL) and their 52nd overall. It was also the final season under the ownership of Al Davis, who died on October 8, 2011. The Raiders matched their 8–8 record from 2010, finishing in a three-way tie with the Denver Broncos and San Diego Chargers for the AFC West division title, but lost tiebreakers to both teams, and missed the playoffs for the ninth consecutive season.

On January 4, 2011, it was announced that head coach Tom Cable's contract would not be extended. Cable would be replaced by Hue Jackson, the team's former offensive coordinator. The Raiders traded their first-round selection in the 2011 NFL draft (17th overall) to the New England Patriots. With their eighth win on December 24 over the Chiefs, the Raiders secured their second consecutive non-losing season. Although TV blackouts had been a persistent issue over the years, all eight regular season home games were sold out for the first time since moving from Los Angeles to Oakland in 1995. The team set the record for being the most penalized team in NFL history, breaking the record previously held by the 1998 Kansas City Chiefs. This season also marked the first consecutive non-losing season for the Raiders since 1998–2002. Oakland went 5–3 on the road, but only 3–5 at home, which ultimately cost them a trip to the postseason.

== Offseason ==
The Raiders lost guard Robert Gallery and tight end Zach Miller to the Seattle Seahawks and cornerback Nnamdi Asomugha to the Philadelphia Eagles. Bruce Gradkowski, who had been with the team since 2009, left to go to Cincinnati. After the 2010 season, Daniel Loper and Jay Alford decided they had played their final NFL games.

=== Draft ===
The Raiders did not have a first-round selection. In September 2009, the team acquired DT Richard Seymour from the New England Patriots in exchange for its 2011 first-round selection (#17 overall).

2011 Oakland Raiders draft
Round	Pick	Player	Position	College	Notes
2	48	Stefen Wisniewski	C	Penn St	
3	81	DeMarcus Van Dyke	CB	Miami (FL)	
3	92	Joseph Barksdale	OT	LSU	
4	113	Chimdi Chekwa	CB	Ohio St	
4	125	Taiwan Jones	RB	Eastern Washington	
5	148	Denarius Moore	WR	Tennessee	
6	181	Richard Gordon	TE	Miami (FL)	
7	241	David Ausberry	WR	USC	
Made roster † Pro Football Hall of Fame * Made at least one Pro Bowl during career

== Staff ==
Oakland Raiders 2011 staff
Front office: Owner(s) – Mark and Carol Davis (majority owners); Chief executive – Amy Trask; Senior executive – John Herrera; Head coaches: Head coach – Hue Jackson; Offensive coaches: Offensive coordinator / quarterbacks – Al Saunders; Running backs – Kelly Skipper; Wide receivers – Sanjay Lal; Tight ends – Adam Henry; Offensive line – Bob Wylie; Assistant offensive line – Steve Wisniewski; Offensive assistant – Eric Sanders	Defensive coaches: Defensive coordinator – Chuck Bresnahan; Defensive line – Mike Waufle; Linebackers – Greg Biekert; Assistant linebackers – Ricky Hunley; Cornerbacks – Rod Woodson; Safeties – Kevin Ross; Defensive assistant – Mike Clark; Special teams coaches: Special teams coordinator – John Fassel; Special teams assistant – Bob Ligashesky; Strength and conditioning: Strength and conditioning – Brad Roll; Strength and conditioning assistant – Chris DiSanto; Strength and conditioning assistant – Chris Pearson

== Final roster ==
2011 Oakland Raiders roster
Quarterbacks (QB): 7 Kyle Boller; 8 Jason Campbell; 3 Carson Palmer; 6 Terrelle Pryor; Running backs (RB): 29 Michael Bush; 25 Rock Cartwright; 22 Taiwan Jones; 20 Darren McFadden; 45 Marcel Reece FB; 41 Manase Tonga FB; Wide receivers (WR): 12 Jacoby Ford; 85 Darrius Heyward-Bey; 84 T. J. Houshmandzadeh; 17 Denarius Moore; 18 Louis Murphy; 81 Chaz Schilens; Tight ends (TE): 86 David Ausberry; 87 Kevin Boss; 82 Richard Gordon; 83 Brandon Myers	Offensive linemen (OL): 72 Joe Barksdale T; 69 Khalif Barnes T; 74 Bruce Campbell T; 66 Cooper Carlisle G; 75 Stephon Heyer G; 64 Samson Satele C; 68 Jared Veldheer T; 61 Stefen Wisniewski G/C; Defensive linemen (DL): 95 Mason Brodine DE; 90 Desmond Bryant DE; 79 John Henderson DT; 99 Lamarr Houston DE; 93 Tommy Kelly DT; 94 Jarvis Moss DE; 91 Trevor Scott DE; 92 Richard Seymour DT	Linebackers (LB): 56 Darryl Blackstock MLB; 51 Aaron Curry OLB; 52 Quentin Groves OLB; 55 Rolando McClain MLB; 96 Kamerion Wimbley OLB; Defensive backs (DB): 30 Jerome Boyd SS; 33 Tyvon Branch SS; 27 Matt Giordano FS; 24 Michael Huff FS; 32 Bryan McCann CB; 34 Mike Mitchell CB; 26 Stanford Routt CB; 21 Lito Sheppard CB; 23 DeMarcus Van Dyke CB; Special teams (ST): 59 Jon Condo LS; 11 Sebastian Janikowski K; 9 Shane Lechler P	Practice squad: 73 Jamie Cumbie DT; 70 Zach Hurd G; 53 Carl Ihenacho LB; 97 Travis Ivey DT; 28 Terrail Lambert S; 16 Eddie McGee WR; 36 Lonyae Miller RB; 65 Alex Parsons C; Reserve: 35 Chimdi Chekwa CB (IR); 31 Hiram Eugene FS (IR); 50 Travis Goethel MLB (IR); 37 Chris Johnson CB (NF-Ill.); 14 Derrick Jones WR (IR); 42 James McCluskey FB (IR); 77 Matt Shaughnessy DE (IR); Rookies in italics 53 active, 7 reserve, 8 practice squad

== Preseason ==
=== Schedule ===
The Raiders' preseason schedule was announced on April 12, 2011.

Week	Date	Opponent	Result	Record	Venue	NFL.com recap
1	August 11	Arizona Cardinals	L 18–24	0–1	O.co Coliseum	Recap
2	August 20	at San Francisco 49ers	L 3–17	0–2	Candlestick Park	Recap
3	August 28	New Orleans Saints	L 20–40	0–3	O.co Coliseum	Recap
4	September 2	at Seattle Seahawks	L 3–20	0–4	CenturyLink Field	Recap

=== Candlestick Park incident ===
The preseason game against the 49ers was marked by brawls in the stands and a major beating in a restroom at Candlestick Park. The NFL officially discontinued all future preseason games between the two teams.

== Regular season ==
=== Schedule ===
Week	Date	Opponent	Result	Record	Venue	NFL.com recap
1	September 12	at Denver Broncos	W 23–20	1–0	Sports Authority Field at Mile High	Recap
2	September 18	at Buffalo Bills	L 35–38	1–1	Ralph Wilson Stadium	Recap
3	September 25	New York Jets	W 34–24	2–1	O.co Coliseum	Recap
4	October 2	New England Patriots	L 19–31	2–2	O.co Coliseum	Recap
5	October 9	at Houston Texans	W 25–20	3–2	Reliant Stadium	Recap
6	October 16	Cleveland Browns	W 24–17	4–2	O.co Coliseum	Recap
7	October 23	Kansas City Chiefs	L 0–28	4–3	O.co Coliseum	Recap
8	Bye					
9	November 6	Denver Broncos	L 24–38	4–4	O.co Coliseum	Recap
10	November 10	at San Diego Chargers	W 24–17	5–4	Qualcomm Stadium	Recap
11	November 20	at Minnesota Vikings	W 27–21	6–4	Hubert H. Humphrey Metrodome	Recap
12	November 27	Chicago Bears	W 25–20	7–4	O.co Coliseum	Recap
13	December 4	at Miami Dolphins	L 14–34	7–5	Sun Life Stadium	Recap
14	December 11	at Green Bay Packers	L 16–46	7–6	Lambeau Field	Recap
15	December 18	Detroit Lions	L 27–28	7–7	O.co Coliseum	Recap
16	December 24	at Kansas City Chiefs	W 16–13 (OT)	8–7	Arrowhead Stadium	Recap
17	January 1	San Diego Chargers	L 26–38	8–8	O.co Coliseum	Recap

=== Game summaries ===
==== Week 1 ====
Team	1	2	3	4	Total
• Raiders	0	16	0	7	23
Broncos	3	0	10	7	20

- Date: September 12
- Location: Sports Authority Field at Mile High, Denver, CO
- Game start: 10:20 p.m. EST
- Elapsed time: 3:20
- Game attendance: 75,671
- Game weather: Mostly cloudy; 75 °F (24 °C); wind 6 mph (9.7 km/h)
- Referee: Jerome Boger
- TV announcers (ESPN): Brad Nessler and Trent Dilfer

Scoring summary
Q1	9:55	DEN	Prater 28 yard field goal	DEN 3–0
Q2	13:28	OAK	Reece 3 yard pass from Campbell (Janikowski kick)	OAK 7–3
Q2	11:14	OAK	Janikowski 37 yard field goal	OAK 10–3
Q2	1:27	OAK	Janikowski 21 yard field goal	OAK 13–3
Q2	:00	OAK	Janikowski 63 yard field goal	OAK 16–3
Q3	12:31	DEN	Decker 90 yard punt return (Prater kick)	OAK 16–10
Q3	1:55	DEN	Prater 30 yard field goal	OAK 16–13
Q4	12:33	OAK	Campbell 1 yard run (Janikowski kick)	OAK 23–13
Q4	3:43	DEN	Ball 9 yard pass from Orton (Prater kick)	OAK 23–20

The Raiders began their 2011 campaign at Sports Authority Field at Mile High, for a Week 1 AFC West duel with the Denver Broncos in the second game of Monday Night Football's doubleheader. Oakland trailed early in the first quarter as Broncos kicker Matt Prater got a 28-yard field goal. The Raiders answered in the second quarter as quarterback Jason Campbell found fullback Marcel Reece on a 3-yard touchdown pass, followed by a 37-yard, a 21-yard, and an NFL record tying 63-yard field goal from kicker Sebastian Janikowski. Janikowski's leg helped put the Raiders up 16–3 at halftime.

Denver answered in the third quarter as wide receiver Eric Decker returned a punt 90 yards for a touchdown, followed by Prater getting a 30-yard field goal. Oakland struck back in the fourth quarter with Campbell's 1-yard touchdown. The Broncos tried to rally with quarterback Kyle Orton completing a 9-yard touchdown pass to running back Lance Ball, yet the Raiders' offense was able to run out the clock.

With the win, not only did Oakland begin their season at 1–0, but they also snapped their 8-straight opening day losing streak.

==== Week 2 ====
Team	1	2	3	4	Total
Raiders	0	21	0	14	35
• Bills	0	3	14	21	38

- Date: September 18
- Location: Ralph Wilson Stadium, Orchard Park, NY
- Game start: 1:00 p.m. EST
- Elapsed time: 3:29
- Game attendance: 68,191
- Game weather: Sunny; 65 °F (18 °C); wind 5 mph (8.0 km/h)
- Referee: Mike Carey
- TV announcers (CBS): Kevin Harlan and Solomon Wilcots

Scoring summary
Q2	11:33	OAK	Bush 1 yard run (Janikowski kick)	OAK 7–0
Q2	8:08	OAK	McFadden 5 yard run (Janikowski kick)	OAK 14–0
Q2	2:22	BUF	Lindell 25 yard field goal	OAK 14–3
Q2	1:22	OAK	Campbell 1 yard run (Janikowski kick)	OAK 21–3
Q3	13:26	BUF	Jackson 43 yard run (Lindell kick)	OAK 21–10
Q3	3:41	BUF	Johnson 7 yard pass from Fitzpatrick (Lindell kick)	OAK 21–17
Q4	14:10	BUF	Jackson 1 yard run (Lindell kick)	BUF 24–21
Q4	9:18	OAK	McFadden 12 yard pass from Campbell (Janikowski kick)	OAK 28–24
Q4	4:48	BUF	Chandler 6 yard pass from Fitzpatrick (Lindell kick)	BUF 31–28
Q4	3:41	OAK	Moore 50 yard pass from Campbell (Janikowski kick)	OAK 35–31
Q4	:14	BUF	Nelson 6 yard pass from Fitzpatrick (Lindell kick)	BUF 38–35

==== Week 3 ====
Team	1	2	3	4	Total
Jets	7	10	0	7	24
• Raiders	7	10	7	10	34

- Date: September 25
- Location: O.co Coliseum, Oakland, CA
- Game start: 4:05 p.m. EST
- Elapsed time: 3:18
- Game attendance: 61,546
- Game weather: Cloudy; 70 °F (21 °C); wind 7 mph (11 km/h)
- Referee: Gene Steratore
- TV announcers (CBS): Jim Nantz and Phil Simms

Scoring summary
Q1	12:36	OAK	McFadden 2 yard run (Janikowski kick)	OAK 7–0
Q1	6:37	NYJ	Sanchez 1 yard run (Folk kick)	Tie 7–7
Q2	13:24	NYJ	Tomlinson 18 yard pass from Sanchez (Folk kick)	NYJ 14–7
Q2	5:03	NYJ	Folk 21 yard field goal	NYJ 17–7
Q2	3:40	OAK	McFadden 70 yard run (Janikowski kick)	NYJ 17–14
Q2	:00	OAK	Janikowski 54 yard field goal	Tie 17–17
Q3	:40	OAK	Moore 23 yard run (Janikowski kick)	OAK 24–17
Q4	14:58	OAK	Bush 1 yard run (Janikowski kick)	OAK 31–17
Q4	5:33	NYJ	Burres 16 yard pass from Sanchez (Folk kick)	OAK 31–24
Q4	2:37	OAK	Janikowski 49 yard field goal	OAK 34–24

==== Week 4 ====
Team	1	2	3	4	Total
• Patriots	7	10	7	7	31
Raiders	3	7	3	6	19

- Date: October 2
- Location: O.co Coliseum, Oakland, CA
- Game start: 4:15 p.m. EST
- Game attendance: 62,572
- Game weather: Partly cloudy; 71 °F (22 °C)
- Referee: Tony Corrente
- TV announcers (CBS): Kevin Harlan and Solomon Wilcots

==== Week 5 ====
Team	1	2	3	4	Total
• Raiders	3	9	3	10	25
Texans	7	7	3	3	20

- Date: October 9
- Location: Reliant Stadium, Houston, TX
- Game start: 1:00 p.m. EST
- Elapsed time: 3:35
- Game attendance: 71,420
- Game weather: Indoors (roof closed)
- Referee: Peter Morelli
- TV announcers (CBS): Ian Eagle and Dan Fouts

Scoring summary
Q1	8:09	HOU	Walter 5 yard pass from Schaub (Rackers kick)	HOU 7–0
Q1	3:26	OAK	Janikowski 54 yard field goal	HOU 7–3
Q2	14:55	OAK	Janikowski 55 yard field goal	HOU 7–6
Q2	11:57	HOU	Dreessen 56 yard pass from Schaub (Rackers kick)	HOU 14–6
Q2	1:09	OAK	Heyward-Bay 34 yard pass from Campbell (pass failed)	HOU 14–12
Q3	5:12	OAK	Janikowski 50 yard field goal	OAK 15–14
Q3	1:59	HOU	Rackers 54 yard field goal	HOU 17–15
Q4	14:50	OAK	Schilens 18 yard pass from Campbell (Janikowski kick)	OAK 22–17
Q4	10:00	OAK	Janikowski 42 yard field goal	OAK 25–17
Q4	2:56	HOU	Rackers 40 yard field goal	OAK 25–20

A day after owner Al Davis died, the Raiders fought back from an early deficit and defensive back Michael Huff made a pick in the end zone in the waning seconds for an emotional victory. On that final play, the Raiders only had ten men on the field on defense, and Huff emotionally stated that he believed the team's late owner, Al Davis, "had his hand on that ball."

==== Week 6 ====
Team	1	2	3	4	Total
Browns	0	7	0	10	17
• Raiders	7	7	10	0	24

- Date: October 16
- Location: O.co Coliseum, Oakland, CA
- Game start: 4:05 p.m. EST
- Game attendance: 57,300
- Game weather: Sunny; 71 °F (22 °C)
- Referee: Carl Cheffers
- TV announcers (CBS): Marv Albert and Rich Gannon

==== Week 7 ====
Team	1	2	3	4	Total
• Chiefs	14	0	7	7	28
Raiders	0	0	0	0	0

- Date: October 23
- Location: O.co Coliseum, Oakland, CA
- Game start: 4:05 p.m. EST
- Game attendance: 57,361
- Game weather: Sunny; 79 °F (26 °C)
- Referee: Jeff Triplette
- TV announcers (CBS): Ian Eagle and Dan Fouts

With the loss, the Raiders went into their bye week at 4–3. Also, the Raiders were shut out at home for the first time since Week 1 of the 2006 season when the team was shut out by the Chargers.

==== Week 9 ====
Team	1	2	3	4	Total
• Broncos	7	0	17	14	38
Raiders	3	14	7	0	24

- Date: November 6
- Location: O.co Coliseum, Oakland, CA
- Game start: 4:05 p.m. EST
- Game attendance: 58,125
- Game weather: Partly cloudy; 62 °F (17 °C)
- Referee: John Parry
- TV announcers (CBS): Greg Gumbel and Dan Dierdorf

==== Week 10 ====
Team	1	2	3	4	Total
• Raiders	7	10	7	0	24
Chargers	3	0	14	0	17

- Date: November 10
- Location: Qualcomm Stadium, San Diego, CA
- Game start: 8:20 p.m. EST
- Elapsed time: 3:15
- Game attendance: 68,109
- Game weather: Clear; 69 °F (21 °C); wind 5 mph (8.0 km/h)
- Referee: Ed Hochuli
- TV announcers (NFLN^{[a]}): Brad Nessler, Mike Mayock, and Alex Flanagan

Scoring summary
Q1	10:40	SD	Novak 40 yard field goal	SD 7–3
Q1	:41	OAK	Bush 2 yard run (Janikowski kick)	OAK 7–3
Q2	11:02	OAK	Janikowski 23 yard field goal	OAK 10–3
Q2	1:51	OAK	Moore 33 yard pass from Palmer (Janikowski kick)	OAK 17–3
Q3	11:48	SD	Brown 30 yard pass from Rivers (Novak kick)	OAK 17–10
Q3	9:01	OAK	Moore 26 yard pass from Palmer (Janikowski kick)	OAK 24–10
Q3	:00	SD	Hester 7 yard pass from Rivers (Novak kick)	OAK 24–17

Trying to snap a two-game losing streak, the Raiders flew to Qualcomm Stadium for a Week 10 AFC West duel with the San Diego Chargers on Thursday night. Oakland trailed early in the first quarter as Chargers kicker Nick Novak got a 20-yard field goal, yet the Raiders answered with a 2-yard touchdown run from running back Michael Bush. Oakland added onto their lead in the second quarter with a 23-yard field goal from kicker Sebastian Janikowski, followed by quarterback Carson Palmer finding rookie wide receiver Denarius Moore on a 33-yard touchdown pass.

San Diego began the third quarter with quarterback Philip Rivers completing a 30-yard touchdown pass to wide receiver Vincent Brown, yet the Raiders struck back with Palmer hooking up with Moore again on a 26-yard touchdown pass. Afterwards, the Chargers closed out the quarter with Rivers completing a 7-yard touchdown pass to fullback Jacob Hester. From there, Oakland's defense held on to preserve the victory.

With the win, the Raiders improved to 5–4, and took the lead of the AFC West.

==== Week 11 ====
Team	1	2	3	4	Total
• Raiders	3	21	3	0	27
Vikings	7	0	0	14	21

- Date: November 20
- Location: Mall of America Field at Hubert H. Humphrey Metrodome, Minneapolis, MN
- Game start: 1:00 p.m. EST
- Elapsed time: 3:14
- Game attendance: 62,748
- Game weather: Indoors (dome)
- Referee: Jerome Boger
- TV announcers (CBS): Kevin Harlan and Solomon Wilcots

Scoring summary
Q1	5:17	MIN	Peterson 12 yard run (Longwell kick)	MIN 7–0
Q1	:57	OAK	Janikowski 29 yard field goal	MIN 7–3
Q2	9:10	OAK	Schilens 11 yard pass from Palmer (Janikowski kick)	OAK 10–7
Q2	1:20	OAK	Bush 2 yard run (Janikowski kick)	OAK 17–7
Q2	:08	OAK	Palmer 1 yard run (Janikowski kick)	OAK 24–7
Q3	:51	OAK	Janikowski 26 yard field goal	OAK 27–7
Q4	14:52	MIN	Harvin 26 yard pass from Ponder (Longwell kick)	OAK 27–14
Q4	5:08	MIN	Rudolph 1 yard pass from Ponder (Longwell kick)	OAK 27–21

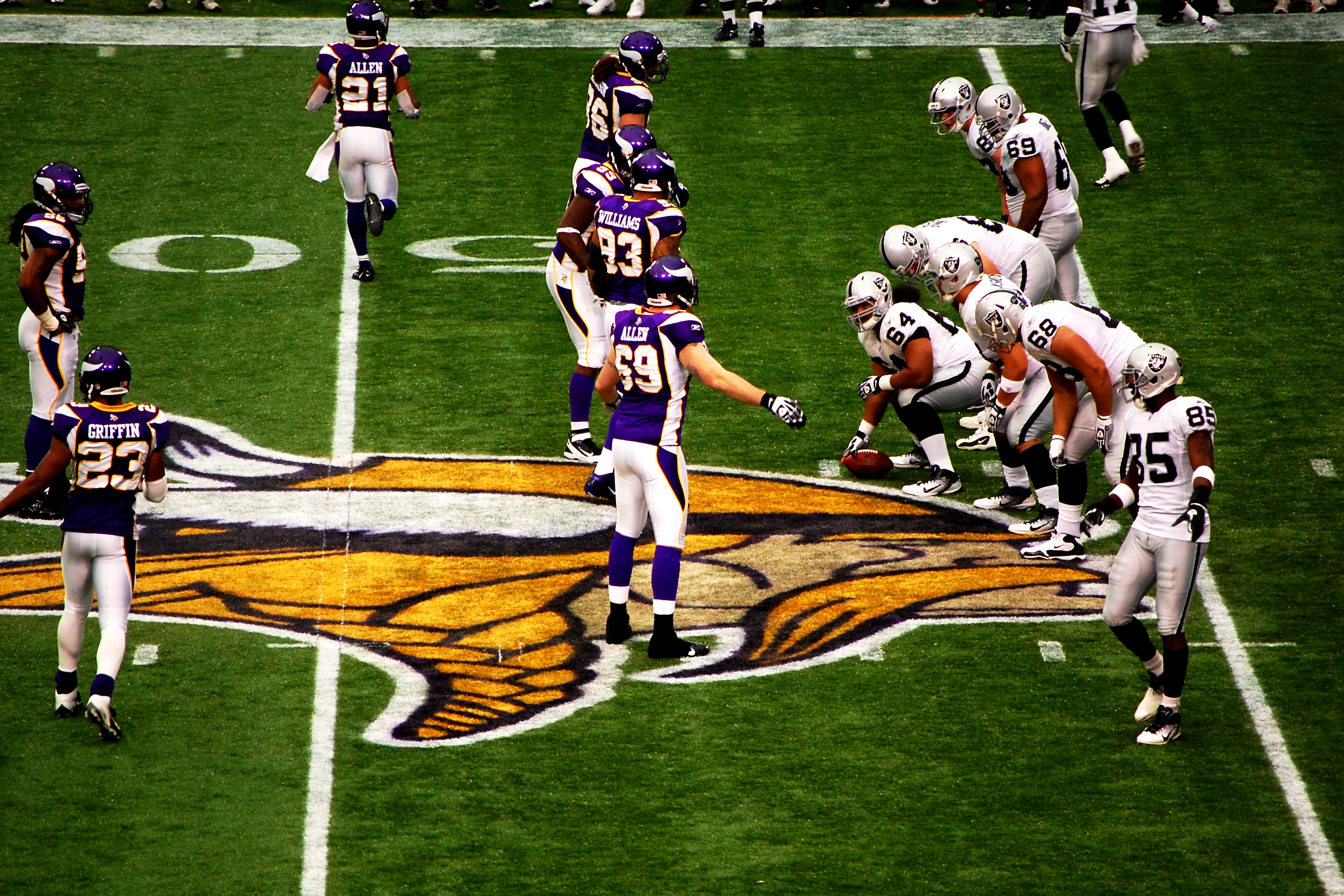
Oakland at Minnesota in week 11

==== Week 12 ====
Team	1	2	3	4	Total
Bears	0	7	0	13	20
• Raiders	6	6	6	7	25

- Date: November 27
- Location: O.co Coliseum, Oakland, CA
- Game start: 4:05 p.m. EST
- Game attendance: 59,244
- Game weather: Partly cloudy; 59 °F (15 °C)
- Referee: Ron Winter
- TV announcers (Fox): Kenny Albert, Daryl Johnston, and Tony Siragusa

Sebastian Janikowski kicked a team-record six field goals and the Raiders took advantage of three interceptions from Chicago's Caleb Hanie to beat the Bears 25–20 Sunday.

Carson Palmer threw for 301 yards and Michael Bush iced the game with a touchdown run in the fourth quarter to lead the Raiders (7–4) to their third straight win against a Bears team missing starting quarterback Jay Cutler.

==== Week 13 ====
Team	1	2	3	4	Total
Raiders	0	0	0	14	14
• Dolphins	6	7	21	0	34

- Date: December 4
- Location: Sun Life Stadium, Miami Gardens, FL
- Game start: 1:00 p.m. EST
- Game attendance: 57,225
- Game weather: Sunny; 80 °F (27 °C)
- Referee: Mike Carey
- TV announcers (CBS): Greg Gumbel and Dan Dierdorf

==== Week 14 ====
Team	1	2	3	4	Total
Raiders	0	0	7	9	16
• Packers	14	17	12	3	46

- Date: December 11
- Location: Lambeau Field, Green Bay, WI
- Game start: 4:15 p.m. EST
- Game attendance: 70,524
- Game weather: Clear; 43 °F (6 °C)
- Referee: Pete Morelli
- TV announcers (CBS): Jim Nantz and Phil Simms

==== Week 15 ====
Team	1	2	3	4	Total
• Lions	7	7	0	14	28
Raiders	7	10	0	10	27

- Date: December 18
- Location: O.co Coliseum, Oakland, CA
- Game start: 4:05 p.m. EST
- Elapsed time: 3:18
- Game attendance: 59,069
- Game weather: Cloudy; 50 °F (10 °C); wind 1 mph (1.6 km/h)
- Referee: Bill Leavy
- TV announcers (Fox): Thom Brennaman, Brian Billick, and Laura Okmin

Scoring summary
Q1	6:19	OAK	Murphy 12 yard run (Janikowski kick)	OAK 7–0
Q1	3:34	DET	Johnson 51 yard pass from Stafford (Hanson kick)	Tie 7–7
Q2	9:07	OAK	Heyward-Bay 43 yard pass from Palmer (Janikowski kick)	OAK 14–7
Q2	1:14	DET	Burleson 39 yard pass from Stafford (Hanson kick)	Tie 14–14
Q2	:00	OAK	Janikowski 46 yard field goal	OAK 17–14
Q4	8:12	OAK	Janikowski 51 yard field goal	OAK 20–14
Q4	7:47	OAK	Curry 6 yard fumble return (Janikowski kick)	OAK 27–14
Q4	4:59	DET	Young 3 yard pass from Stafford (Hanson kick)	OAK 27–21
Q4	:39	DET	Johnson 6 yard pass from Stafford (Hanson kick)	DET 28–27

==== Week 16 ====
Team	1	2	3	4	OT	Total
• Raiders	3	0	7	3	3	16
Chiefs	3	0	3	7	0	13

- Date: December 24
- Location: Arrowhead Stadium, Kansas City, MO
- Game start: 1:00 p.m. EST
- Game attendance: 70,803
- Game weather: Sunny; 38 °F (3 °C)
- Referee: Mike Carey
- TV announcers (CBS): Kevin Harlan and Solomon Wilcots

==== Week 17 ====
Team	1	2	3	4	Total
• Chargers	7	17	7	7	38
Raiders	7	6	6	7	26

- Date: January 1
- Location: O.co Coliseum, Oakland, CA
- Game start: 4:15 p.m. EST
- Game attendance: 58,721
- Game weather: Clear; 56 °F (13 °C)
- Referee: Clete Blakeman
- TV announcers (CBS): Marv Albert and Rich Gannon

With the loss, the Raiders' season ended at 8–8 and their three-game winning streak over the Chargers was snapped. The loss also allowed the Broncos to win the AFC West.

=== Standings ===
AFC West
	W	L	T	PCT	DIV	CONF	PF	PA	STK
^{(4)} Denver Broncos	8	8	0	.500	3–3	6–6	309	390	L3
San Diego Chargers	8	8	0	.500	3–3	7–5	406	377	W1
Oakland Raiders	8	8	0	.500	3–3	6–6	359	433	L1
Kansas City Chiefs	7	9	0	.438	3–3	4–8	212	338	W1

=== Death of owner Al Davis ===
On October 8, one day before the team's Week 5 game at the Houston Texans, owner Al Davis died in his Oakland, California home at the age of 82. The Raiders won the game 25–20.

=== Acquisition of Carson Palmer ===
On October 18, 2011, the Raiders acquired quarterback Carson Palmer from the Cincinnati Bengals for a 2012 first round draft pick and a conditional 2013 first round pick based on incentives. The trade was made two days after Jason Campbell suffered a potential season ending collarbone injury in Week 6 against the Cleveland Browns.

=== Firing of Hue Jackson ===
On January 10, 2012, the Raiders announced that head coach Hue Jackson would be fired.
