= Vincent Brown (wide receiver) =

American football player (born 1989)

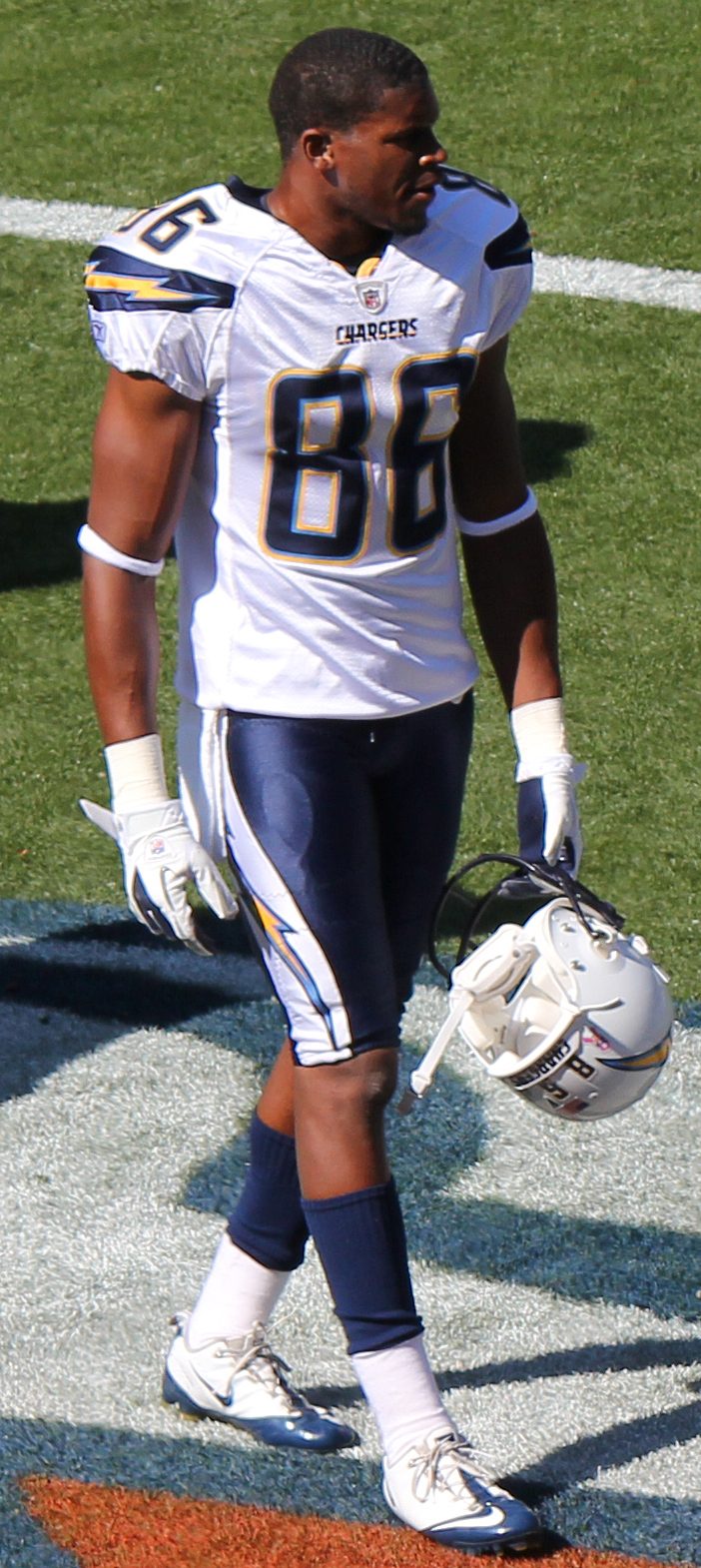
- Brown with the San Diego Chargers in 2011

No. 86, 19
- Position: Wide receiver

Personal information
- Born: January 25, 1989 (age 37); Upland, California, U.S.
- Listed height: 5 ft 11 in (1.80 m)
- Listed weight: 190 lb (86 kg)

Career information
- High school: Rancho Cucamonga (Rancho Cucamonga, California)
- College: San Diego State (2007–2010)
- NFL draft: 2011: 3rd round, 82nd overall pick

Career history
- San Diego Chargers (2011–2013); Oakland Raiders (2014); Indianapolis Colts (2015)*; San Diego Chargers (2015); New Orleans Saints (2016)*
- * Offseason or practice squad member only

Awards and highlights
- First-team All-MW (2010); Second-team All-MW (2009)

Career NFL statistics
- Receptions: 73
- Receiving yards: 941
- Receiving average: 12.9
- Receiving touchdowns: 3
- Stats at Pro Football Reference

Vincent Brown Jr. (born January 25, 1989) is an American former professional football player who was a wide receiver in the National Football League (NFL). He played college football for the San Diego State Aztecs, and was selected by the San Diego Chargers in the third round of the 2011 NFL draft.

== Early life ==
Brown was born in Upland, California and raised in Rancho Cucamonga, California. He attended Rancho Cucamonga High School from 2003 to 2007. He was voted team MVP as a senior and was voted twice to the All-Baseline League football team.

== College career ==
=== Freshman ===
Brown played in all 12 games as a freshman and started in eight of them in 2007. He ended the season fourth on the team in receptions with 31 and receiving yards with 349. He is third in school history for receptions by a freshman and fourth in receiving yards by a freshman. He also returned 25 kickoffs for 547 yards. His six returns for 146 yards against Washington State, stand as the sixth most return yards in a single game in school history.

=== Sophomore ===
Brown started in all 12 games his sophomore year for the Aztecs. He led the team by a wide margin with 64 catches for 631 receiving yards in 2008. Five of his catches were for touchdowns. He had a career day against Idaho when he caught 8 passes for 183 yards and three touchdowns. He became the 47th Aztec to have two 100 yard receiving games in his career. He ended the season averaging fifth best in the Mountain West Conference for receptions per game with 5.3.

=== Junior ===
Brown started in the first seven games of the Aztec's season before suffering a season-ending thumb injury. He had at least one hundred receiving yards in each of his first four games in 2009. He also scored at least one touchdown in his first five games to start the season. He became the 24th Aztec to reach the 100 career receptions milestone in his game against UCLA. He had a career-high 13 receptions against Idaho. He finished the year with 45 catches for 778 yards and 6 touchdowns. And despite missing the final five games of the season, Brown finished as one of the ten finalists for the Biletnikoff Award and received Second-team all-Mountain West honors.

=== Senior ===
Brown finished his career at San Diego State with 69 catches for 1,352 receiving yards and 10 touchdowns in 2010. He is now in fourth place in school history for receiving yards in a single season. His final game as an Aztec came in the 2010 Poinsettia Bowl. He had a Poinsettia Bowl record 8 receptions for 165 yards against Navy. He finished his career with 209 receptions for 3,110 receiving yards and 23 touchdowns. He had a record-tying thirteen 100 yard receiving games and ranks third in school history in both receptions and receiving yards and fifth in touchdowns.

== Professional career ==
Pre-draft measurables
Height	Weight	Arm length	Hand span	Wingspan	40-yard dash	10-yard split	20-yard split	20-yard shuttle	Three-cone drill	Vertical jump	Broad jump	Bench press
5 ft 11 1/4 in (1.81 m)	187 lb (85 kg)	33 in (0.84 m)	10 1/4 in (0.26 m)	6 ft 4 1/8 in (1.93 m)	4.57 s	1.56 s	2.65 s	4.25 s	6.64 s	36.0 in (0.91 m)	10 ft 1 in (3.07 m)	12 reps
All values from NFL Combine/Pro Day

=== San Diego Chargers (first stint) ===
Brown was selected by the San Diego Chargers with the 82nd pick in the 2011 NFL draft. In his rookie season, he had 19 catches for over 300 yards and 3 touchdowns, with 17.3 yards per catch.

On August 18, 2012, Brown broke his ankle in the second preseason game against the Dallas Cowboys. He was placed on injured reserve, but was chosen as the Chargers' Designated to Return player and was allowed to return to the active roster as early as week 6 of the 2012 NFL season. Ultimately, Brown did not end up playing a snap for the Chargers during the 2012 season. His absence was felt on the field as the Chargers' offense dropped to 20th in points scored after ranking in the top five for eight consecutive years. He was waived-injured on August 30, 2014, cleared waivers, and then was placed on injured reserve on August 31, 2014. On September 6, 2014, the Chargers waived Brown with an injury settlement for 2.5 game checks making him a free agent.

=== Oakland Raiders ===
On September 15, 2014, Brown signed a one-year deal with the Oakland Raiders.

=== Indianapolis Colts ===
On March 31, 2015, Brown signed with the Indianapolis Colts. He was waived on September 5, 2015.

=== San Diego Chargers (second stint) ===
On December 8, 2015, Brown was re-signed by the Chargers because of the team's depleted depth at the wide receiver position and the loss of receiver Dontrelle Inman. On December 29, 2015, Brown was waived.

=== New Orleans Saints ===
The Saints signed Brown to a contract on May 23, 2016, following a tryout the previous week.

The Saints placed Brown on injured reserve on July 26, 2016, following a failed physical.

The Saints released Brown and gave him an injury settlement on July 29, 2016.

=== NFL statistics ===
Year	Team	Games	Receptions	Targets	Receiving yards	Average yards per reception	Longest reception	Receiving touchdowns	First downs	Fumbles	Fumbles lost
2011	SD	14	19	41	329	17.3	31	2	17	0	0
2013	SD	16	41	69	472	11.5	51	1	28	0	0
2014	OAK	7	12	21	118	9.8	20	0	6	0	0
2015	SD	1	1	2	22	22.0	22	0	1	0	0
Career		38	73	133	941	12.9	51	3	52	0	0

== Personal life ==
Brown studied philosophy at San Diego State and became the first member of his family to graduate from college when he earned his degree in May 2012. He completed his coursework at the conclusion of his rookie season with the San Diego Chargers and while doing so, co-authored an article that appeared in the Journal of the Philosophy of Sport in September 2012.
