= 2011 NFL season =

American football season

Regular season
- Duration: September 8, 2011 – January 1, 2012

Playoffs
- Start date: January 7, 2012
- AFC Champions: New England Patriots
- NFC Champions: New York Giants

Super Bowl XLVI
- Date: February 5, 2012
- Site: Lucas Oil Stadium, Indianapolis, Indiana
- Champions: New York Giants

Pro Bowl
- Date: January 29, 2012
- Site: Aloha Stadium, Halawa, Honolulu, Hawaii

AFC teams: West, North, South, East
NFC teams: West, North, South, East

The 2011 NFL season was the 92nd regular season of the National Football League (NFL) and the 46th of the Super Bowl era. It began on Thursday, September 8, 2011, with the Super Bowl XLV champion Green Bay Packers defeating the Super Bowl XLIV champion New Orleans Saints at Lambeau Field and ended with Super Bowl XLVI, the league's championship game, on February 5, 2012, at Lucas Oil Stadium in Indianapolis where the New York Giants defeated the New England Patriots 21–17.

Due to a labor dispute between league owners and players, a lockout began on March 11 and ended on July 25, lasting 130 days. Although it initially threatened to postpone or cancel the season, the only game that was canceled was the August 7 Pro Football Hall of Fame Game.

The 2011 season saw an unprecedented amount of passing offense: Three of the nine highest passing yardage totals of all time were established: No. 2 Drew Brees (5,476), No. 3 Tom Brady (5,235), and No. 9 Matthew Stafford (5,038); Eli Manning threw for 4,933 yards, which places him 14th all time. It also saw Green Bay Packers quarterback Aaron Rodgers establish the all-time single-season best quarterback rating of 122.5. Further cementing the modern NFL's reputation as a "passing league" was that, for the second consecutive year, the league overall set a record for most average passing yards per team per game, with 229.7, breaking 2010's record by more than eight yards per game. (For comparison, the league-wide average rushing yards total finished the 2011 season at 57th all-time.)

A subplot of the 2011 season was determining who would have the worst record, and therefore "earn" the right to the No. 1 overall pick in the 2012 draft. Stanford senior quarterback Andrew Luck was seen as the best quarterback prospect in years. Fans of some teams that started the season with numerous losses (notably the Indianapolis Colts) were openly rooting for their teams to "Suck for Luck."

== Labor dispute ==
In May 2008 the owners decided to opt out of the 1993 arrangement and play the 2010 season without an agreement in place. Some of the major points of contention included openness of owners' financial books, the rookie pay scale, a proposed 18 percent reduction in the players' share of revenues, forfeiture on bonus payments for players who fail to perform, players' health and retirement benefits, details of free agency, the cost and benefit of new stadiums, players' salaries, extending the regular season to 18 games, and the revenue-sharing structure. By March 2011, the National Football League Players Association (NFLPA) and the NFL had not yet come to terms on a new collective bargaining agreement (CBA), thus failing to resolve the labor dispute. Accordingly, the NFLPA informed the league and the clubs that the players had voted to have the NFLPA renounce its bargaining rights. After the renunciation of collective bargaining rights, quarterbacks Tom Brady, Peyton Manning, and Drew Brees joined seven other NFL players and filed an antitrust suit to enjoin the lockout.

Following the settlement of the Brady et al. v. NFL antitrust suit on July 25, 2011, a majority of players signed union authorization cards approving the NFL Players Association to act as their exclusive collective bargaining representative. The NFL officially recognized the NFLPA's status as the players' collective bargaining representative on July 30. The NFL and NFLPA proceeded to negotiate terms for a new collective bargaining agreement, and the agreement became effective after ratification by the players on August 4. The new collective bargaining agreement ran through 2021.

== NFL draft ==
The 2011 NFL draft was held from April 28 to 30, 2011 at New York City's Radio City Music Hall. With the first pick, the Carolina Panthers selected quarterback Cam Newton from Auburn.

== Player movement ==
Free agency began on July 25, 2011, following the end of the 2011 NFL lockout.

=== Free agency ===
Notable players to change teams during free agency included:

- Quarterbacks Derek Anderson (Arizona to Carolina), Bruce Gradkowski (Oakland to Cincinnati), Matt Hasselbeck (Seattle to Tennessee), Tarvaris Jackson (Minnesota to Seattle), Matt Moore (Carolina to Miami) and Vince Young (Tennessee to Philadelphia)
- Running backs Ronnie Brown (Miami to Philadelphia), Brandon Jackson (Green Bay to Cleveland), Willis McGahee (Baltimore to Denver), Darren Sproles (San Diego to New Orleans) and Ricky Williams (Miami to Baltimore)
- Fullback Vonta Leach (Houston to Baltimore)
- Wide receivers Steve Breaston (Arizona to Kansas City), Plaxico Burress (N.Y. Giants to N.Y. Jets), Braylon Edwards (N.Y. Jets to San Francisco), Sidney Rice (Minnesota to Seattle), Brad Smith (N.Y. Jets to Buffalo), Steve Smith (N.Y. Giants to Philadelphia), Roy Williams (Dallas to Chicago)
- Tight ends Kevin Boss (N.Y. Giants to Oakland), Todd Heap (Baltimore to Arizona) and Zach Miller (Oakland to Seattle)
- Offensive tackles Ryan Harris (Denver to Philadelphia) and Sean Locklear (Seattle to Washington)
- Guards David Baas (San Francisco to N.Y. Giants), Chris Chester (Baltimore to Washington) and Harvey Dahl (Atlanta to St. Louis)
- Centers Jonathan Goodwin (New Orleans to San Francisco) and Olin Kreutz (Chicago to New Orleans)
- Defensive ends Jason Babin (Tennessee to Philadelphia), Stephen Bowen (Dallas to Washington) and Ray Edwards (Minnesota to Atlanta)
- Defensive tackles Barry Cofield (N.Y. Giants to Washington), Cullen Jenkins (Green Bay to Philadelphia) and Shaun Rogers (Cleveland to New Orleans)
- Linebackers Nick Barnett (Green Bay to Buffalo), Kevin Burnett (San Diego to Miami), Thomas Howard (Oakland to Cincinnati), Manny Lawson (San Francisco to Cincinnati), Paul Posluszny (Buffalo to Jacksonville), Matt Roth (Cleveland to Jacksonville), Clint Session (Indianapolis to Jacksonville) and Stephen Tulloch (Tennessee to Detroit)
- Cornerbacks Nnamdi Asomugha (Oakland to Philadelphia), Nate Clements (San Francisco to Cincinnati), Johnathan Joseph (Cincinnati to Houston), Carlos Rogers (Washington to San Francisco) and Josh Wilson (Baltimore to Washington)
- Safeties Oshiomogho Atogwe (St. Louis to Washington), Dawan Landry (Baltimore to Jacksonville), Danieal Manning (Chicago to Houston), Quintin Mikell (Philadelphia to St. Louis), Bob Sanders (Indianapolis to San Diego) and Donte Whitner (Buffalo to San Francisco).

=== Trades ===
The following notable trades were made during the 2011 league year:

- July 28: Philadelphia traded QB Kevin Kolb to Arizona in exchange for CB Dominique Rodgers-Cromartie and Arizona's second-round selection in 2012.
- July 28: Chicago traded TE Greg Olsen to Carolina in exchange for a third-round selection in 2012.
- July 28: Washington traded DT Albert Haynesworth to New England in exchange for a fifth-round selection in 2013.
- July 29: Cincinnati traded WR Chad Ochocinco to New England in exchange for a fifth-round selection in 2012 and sixth-round selection in 2013.
- July 29: Washington traded QB Donovan McNabb to Minnesota in exchange for a sixth-round pick in 2012.
- July 29: New Orleans traded RB Reggie Bush to Miami exchange for S Jonathon Amaya and a swap of sixth-round selections in 2012.
- August 12: Buffalo traded WR Lee Evans to Baltimore in exchange for a fourth-round pick in 2012.
- August 22: San Francisco traded S Taylor Mays to Cincinnati in exchange for a seventh-round pick in 2012.
- August 29: Seattle sent CB Kelly Jennings to Cincinnati with DE Clinton McDonald going the other way.
- October 12: Seattle traded LB Aaron Curry to Oakland in exchange for a seventh-round pick in 2012 and a conditional pick in 2013.
- October 17: Denver traded WR Brandon Lloyd to St. Louis in exchange for a fifth-round pick in 2012.
- October 18: Cincinnati traded QB Carson Palmer to Oakland in exchange for a first-round pick in 2012 and a conditional second-round pick in 2013.

== Rule changes ==
The following are rule changes that were passed at the league's annual owners meeting in March. These rule changes went into effect once the labor dispute was resolved.

- Changes were made regarding kickoffs to limit injuries. First, kickoffs will be moved from the 30 to the 35-yard line, repealing a 1994 rule change, restoring the 1974 rule. In addition, players on the kickoff coverage team cannot line up more than 5 yards behind the kickoff line, minimizing running starts and thus reducing the speed of collisions. Other changes were also proposed, but a number of players and coaches expressed concern they would actually significantly reduce, if not eliminate, the number of kickoff returns. Proposals that would have brought touchbacks out to the 25 instead of the 20, and eliminated all wedge blocks were not adopted. Despite this rule, the Bears kicked off from the 30-yard line twice in their preseason game against the Bills.
- All replay reviews of scoring plays during the entire game can now be initiated by the replay booth official. Coaches will no longer have to use one of their challenges if a scoring play occurs outside of the two-minute warning. Because the play is now "unchallengeable" by coaches, attempting to do so will result in a 15-yard unsportsmanlike conduct penalty, which several coaches were flagged for during the season.
- Nicknamed the "Boise State Rule", all playing fields must remain green, and not be in another color like the blue turf at Boise State's Bronco Stadium, unless approval is granted by the league. This was passed in response to a few sponsors who requested to change the colors in a few stadiums.

The following rule changes were adopted at the NFL Owners' Meeting on May 24, 2011:

- Hits to the head of a passer-by an opponent's hands, arms or other parts of the body will not be fouls unless they are forcible blows, modifying the existing rule that any contact to a passer's head, regardless of the reason, is penalized as a personal foul (15 yards).
- Players will be prohibited from "launching" (leaving both feet prior to contact to spring forward and upward into an opponent or using any part of the helmet to initiate forcible contact against any part of the opponent's body) to level a defenseless player, as well as "forcibly hitting the neck or head area with the helmet, facemask, forearm or shoulder regardless of whether the defensive player also uses his arms to tackle the defenseless player by encircling or grasping him.", and lowering the head and make forcible contact with the top/crown or forehead/"hairline" parts of the helmet against any part of the defenseless player's body. Offenders will be penalised 15 yards for unnecessary roughness plus risking immediate disqualification if the contact is deemed flagrant.

A "defenseless player" is defined as a:

- Player in the act of or just after throwing a pass.
- Receiver attempting to catch a pass or one who has not completed a catch and hasn't had time to protect himself or hasn't clearly become a runner. If the receiver/runner is capable of avoiding or warding off the impending contact of an opponent, he is no longer a defenseless player.
- Runner whose forward progress has been stopped and is already in the grasp of a tackler.
- Kickoff or punt returner attempting to field a kick in the air.
- Player on the ground at the end of a play.
- Kicker/punter during the kick or return.
- Quarterback any time after a change of possession (i.e. turnover).
- Player who receives a "blindside" block when the blocker is moving toward his own end-line and approaches the opponent from behind or the side.

The league has instructed game officials to "err on the side of caution" when calling such personal foul penalties, and that they will not be downgraded if they make a mistake so that they will not hesitate on making these kinds of calls.

=== Game-day testing ===
- Game-day testing for performance-enhancing drugs. The NFL is adding game-day testing for performance-enhancing substances but not recreational drugs this season under the new collective bargaining agreement.

== Schedule ==
The preseason schedule was released April 12, 2011. The Hall of Fame Game, had it been played, would have featured the Chicago Bears against the St. Louis Rams in only the second time since 1971 that the game would have featured two teams from the same conference. Instead, the preseason began with the San Diego Chargers hosting the Seattle Seahawks on August 11; the remainder of the preseason and all other games was played as originally scheduled (with the exception of the preseason New York Jets-New York Giants game, which was postponed two days due to Hurricane Irene).

The 2011 season began on Thursday, September 8, 2011, at Lambeau Field, with the Super Bowl XLV champion Green Bay Packers hosting the New Orleans Saints in the kickoff game; the last regular season games were held on Sunday, January 1, 2012. The playoffs started on Saturday, January 7, 2012, and ended with Super Bowl XLVI, the league's championship game, on February 5, 2012, at Lucas Oil Stadium in Indianapolis.

Under the NFL's scheduling formula, intraconference and interconference matchups were:

Intraconference

- AFC East vs. AFC West
- AFC North vs. AFC South
- NFC East vs. NFC West
- NFC North vs. NFC South

Interconference

- AFC East vs. NFC East
- AFC West vs. NFC North
- AFC North vs. NFC West
- AFC South vs. NFC South

When the league was arranging the schedule in spring 2011, it added some cushion in case the labor dispute lasted into September and the planned start of the regular season. For example, every contest in Week 3 had teams which shared the same bye week later in the season, which would have allowed these games to be made up on what were originally the teams' byes. Weeks 2 and 4 were set up so that there were neither any divisional rivalry games nor teams on bye in those weeks, and every team with a home game in Week 2 was on the road in Week 4 and vice versa. This would have kept the season as fair as possible if those games had to be canceled. These scheduling changes, along with eliminating the week off before the Super Bowl and moving the Super Bowl back a week, would have allowed the NFL to play a 14-game schedule beginning in mid-October while still having the Super Bowl in mid-February, allowing for as many as the first five weeks to be lost without having to redo the schedule (moving week 3 games into the bye weeks, canceling weeks 2 and 4, and moving weeks 1 and 5 to the end of the season, while postponing the start of the playoffs two weeks, and moving the Super Bowl back a week and having no week off between the conference championship games and Super Bowl).

This season's International Series game featured the Chicago Bears and the Tampa Bay Buccaneers at Wembley Stadium in London on October 23, with the Buccaneers serving as the home team. The Bears won 24–18. It marked the Bears' second game played outside the United States in as many years, as they were a part of the Bills Toronto Series in 2010. The Buccaneers previously appeared in the International Series in 2009. One week later on October 30, the Buffalo Bills defeated the Washington Redskins in the Bills' annual game at Rogers Centre in Toronto by a score of 23–0. Although this was within the bounds of the 2011 CFL season, neither of the two Southern Ontario CFL teams was playing on the same day, and both played away games that weekend. The 2011–12 season also marked the 20th anniversary of the Bills and Redskins meeting in Super Bowl XXVI.

The Detroit Lions hosted their first Monday Night Football game since 2001, when they faced the Chicago Bears on Columbus Day/Canadian Thanksgiving (the Detroit-Windsor market straddles the U.S.–Canada border). The Lions defeated the Bears 24–13 for the team's fifth straight win, the most Lions wins to start a season since the team's glory years in the 1950s, continuing a streak that has been seen as a pleasant surprise for Lions fans, after over a decade of mediocrity.

The 2011 Thanksgiving Day slate featured the Super Bowl Champion Green Bay Packers winning 27–15 on the road against the Detroit Lions and the Dallas Cowboys coming back to defeat the Miami Dolphins 20–19 at home. The Thanksgiving nightcap on the NFL Network showed the Baltimore Ravens defeating the San Francisco 49ers 16–6 at home; this was the first Thanksgiving game for the 49ers since 1972, the first ever for the Ravens, and a game that put first-year 49ers head coach Jim Harbaugh against his brother, Ravens head coach John Harbaugh.

Christmas Day fell on Sunday. The TV contracts stated that the majority of afternoon games would be played on Christmas Eve (Saturday) and only one game was held over for Sunday night. The Green Bay Packers defeated the Chicago Bears, 35–21, on Christmas evening on NBC.

New Year's Day 2012 consequently also fell on a Sunday, and the NFL played its entire Week 17 schedule that day. The major college bowl games usually played on New Year's Day, as well as the NHL Winter Classic, were instead played on Monday, January 2. For the second straight year, Week 17 only featured divisional match-ups.

The New York Giants visited the Washington Redskins on September 11, 2011, the first Sunday of the regular season, to commemorate the tenth anniversary of the September 11 attacks in which Washington, D.C. and New York City were both targeted, as well as the first such anniversary since the killing of Osama bin Laden in May. Due to the proximity of Baltimore with Washington as well as the proximity of Pittsburgh with the site where United Airlines Flight 93 crashed, the Pittsburgh Steelers visited the archrival Baltimore Ravens at M&T Bank Stadium in Baltimore. It marked the first time the two teams played in a season-opening game since 2003, as their heated rivalry usually prompts their games to be scheduled later in the season. There had been some speculation that the Giants and their same-city rival, the New York Jets, could have played each other that day since the two were scheduled to play each other in 2011; the Jets were the designated home team at MetLife Stadium in the matchup which had been predetermined due to the NFL's scheduling formula. However, the Jets instead hosted the Dallas Cowboys.

=== Scheduling changes ===
The following regular-season games were moved by way of flexible scheduling, severe weather, or for other reasons:

- Week 10: The Detroit–Chicago game was moved from 1:00 pm EST to 4:15 pm EST.
- Week 11: The Tennessee–Atlanta game was moved from 1:00 pm EST to 4:15 pm EST.
- Week 13: The Indianapolis–New England game was moved from the 8:20 pm EST time slot on NBC Sunday Night Football to 1:00 pm EST on CBS. The Detroit–New Orleans game, originally scheduled at 1:00 pm EST on Fox, was flexed into the 8:20 pm slot on NBC, in place of the originally-scheduled Colts–Patriots game. The Baltimore–Cleveland game was changed from 1:00 pm EST to 4:05 pm EST. The Denver–Minnesota game was changed from 4:05 pm EST to 1:00 pm EST, and aired on Fox instead of CBS because Fox had only two games in the early time slot. This was the first time that the league moved an interconference telecast to the home team's Sunday afternoon regional broadcaster.
- Week 14: The Oakland–Green Bay game was moved from 1:00 pm EST to 4:15 pm EST.
- Week 17: By way of flexible scheduling, the following games were moved due to playoff implications during the final week of the regular season: The Dallas–New York Giants game, originally scheduled at 1:00 pm EST on Fox, was selected as the final NBC Sunday Night Football game, which decided the NFC East division champion. The Tampa Bay–Atlanta, Baltimore–Cincinnati and Pittsburgh–Cleveland games were all moved from 1:00 pm EST to 4:15 pm EST.

== Regular season standings ==
=== Division ===
AFC East
	W	L	T	PCT	DIV	CONF	PF	PA	STK
^{(1)} New England Patriots	13	3	0	.813	5–1	10–2	513	342	W8
New York Jets	8	8	0	.500	3–3	6–6	377	363	L3
Miami Dolphins	6	10	0	.375	3–3	5–7	329	313	W1
Buffalo Bills	6	10	0	.375	1–5	4–8	372	434	L1

AFC North
	W	L	T	PCT	DIV	CONF	PF	PA	STK
^{(2)} Baltimore Ravens	12	4	0	.750	6–0	9–3	378	266	W2
^{(5)} Pittsburgh Steelers	12	4	0	.750	4–2	9–3	325	227	W2
^{(6)} Cincinnati Bengals	9	7	0	.563	2–4	6–6	344	323	L1
Cleveland Browns	4	12	0	.250	0–6	3–9	218	307	L6

AFC South
	W	L	T	PCT	DIV	CONF	PF	PA	STK
^{(3)} Houston Texans	10	6	0	.625	4–2	8–4	381	278	L3
Tennessee Titans	9	7	0	.563	3–3	7–5	325	317	W2
Jacksonville Jaguars	5	11	0	.313	3–3	4–8	243	329	W1
Indianapolis Colts	2	14	0	.125	2–4	2–10	243	430	L1

AFC West
	W	L	T	PCT	DIV	CONF	PF	PA	STK
^{(4)} Denver Broncos	8	8	0	.500	3–3	6–6	309	390	L3
San Diego Chargers	8	8	0	.500	3–3	7–5	406	377	W1
Oakland Raiders	8	8	0	.500	3–3	6–6	359	433	L1
Kansas City Chiefs	7	9	0	.438	3–3	4–8	212	338	W1

NFC East
	W	L	T	PCT	DIV	CONF	PF	PA	STK
^{(4)} New York Giants	9	7	0	.563	3–3	5–7	394	400	W2
Philadelphia Eagles	8	8	0	.500	5–1	6–6	396	328	W4
Dallas Cowboys	8	8	0	.500	2–4	6–6	369	347	L2
Washington Redskins	5	11	0	.313	2–4	5–7	288	367	L2

NFC North
	W	L	T	PCT	DIV	CONF	PF	PA	STK
^{(1)} Green Bay Packers	15	1	0	.938	6–0	12–0	560	359	W2
^{(6)} Detroit Lions	10	6	0	.625	3–3	6–6	474	387	L1
Chicago Bears	8	8	0	.500	3–3	7–5	353	341	W1
Minnesota Vikings	3	13	0	.188	0–6	3–9	340	449	L1

NFC South
	W	L	T	PCT	DIV	CONF	PF	PA	STK
^{(3)} New Orleans Saints	13	3	0	.813	5–1	9–3	547	339	W8
^{(5)} Atlanta Falcons	10	6	0	.625	3–3	7–5	402	350	W1
Carolina Panthers	6	10	0	.375	2–4	3–9	406	429	L1
Tampa Bay Buccaneers	4	12	0	.250	2–4	3–9	287	494	L10

NFC West
	W	L	T	PCT	DIV	CONF	PF	PA	STK
^{(2)} San Francisco 49ers	13	3	0	.813	5–1	10–2	380	229	W3
Arizona Cardinals	8	8	0	.500	4–2	7–5	312	348	W1
Seattle Seahawks	7	9	0	.438	3–3	6–6	321	315	L2
St. Louis Rams	2	14	0	.125	0–6	1–11	193	407	L7

=== Conference ===
AFC
#	Team	Division	W	L	T	PCT	DIV	CONF	SOS	SOV	STK
Division winners
1	New England Patriots	East	13	3	0	.813	5–1	10–2	.449	.423	W8
2 (Note: Baltimore clinched the AFC North title based on a head-to-head sweep over Pittsburgh.)	Baltimore Ravens	North	12	4	0	.750	6–0	9–3	.477	.484	W2
3	Houston Texans	South	10	6	0	.625	4–2	8–4	.453	.413	L3
4 (Note: Denver clinched the AFC West title instead of San Diego or Oakland based on common record (5–5 to San Diego's and Oakland's 4–6).)	Denver Broncos	West	8	8	0	.500	3–3	6–6	.520	.445	L3
Wild cards
5	Pittsburgh Steelers	North	12	4	0	.750	4–2	9–3	.492	.411	W2
6 (Note: Cincinnati clinched the AFC 6 seed instead of Tennessee based on a head-to-head victory.)	Cincinnati Bengals	North	9	7	0	.563	2–4	6–6	.492	.326	L1
Did not qualify for the postseason
7	Tennessee Titans	South	9	7	0	.563	3–3	7–5	.461	.396	W2
8 (Note: New York Jets finished ahead of San Diego based on head-to-head victory.)	New York Jets	East	8	8	0	.500	3–3	6–6	.500	.395	L3
9 (Note: San Diego finished ahead of Oakland in the AFC West based on conference record (7–5 to 6–6).)	San Diego Chargers	West	8	8	0	.500	3–3	7–5	.516	.430	W1
10	Oakland Raiders	West	8	8	0	.500	3–3	6–6	.504	.438	L1
11	Kansas City Chiefs	West	7	9	0	.438	3–3	4–8	.512	.464	W1
12 (Note: Miami finished ahead of Buffalo based on head-to-head sweep.)	Miami Dolphins	East	6	10	0	.375	3–3	5–7	.504	.417	W1
13	Buffalo Bills	East	6	10	0	.375	1–5	4–8	.520	.510	L1
14	Jacksonville Jaguars	South	5	11	0	.313	3–3	4–8	.500	.363	W1
15	Cleveland Browns	North	4	12	0	.250	0–6	3–9	.531	.313	L6
16	Indianapolis Colts	South	2	14	0	.125	2–4	2–10	.539	.594	L1
Tiebreakers (Note: When breaking ties for three or more teams under the NFL's rules, they are first broken within divisions, then comparing only the highest ranked remaining team from each division.)

NFC
#	Team	Division	W	L	T	PCT	DIV	CONF	SOS	SOV	STK
Division winners
1	Green Bay Packers	North	15	1	0	.938	6–0	12–0	.457	.458	W2
2 (Note: San Francisco clinched the No. 2 seed over New Orleans based on conference record (10–2 to 9–3).)	San Francisco 49ers	West	13	3	0	.813	5–1	10–2	.449	.418	W3
3	New Orleans Saints	South	13	3	0	.813	5–1	9–3	.441	.442	W8
4	New York Giants	East	9	7	0	.563	3–3	5–7	.520	.465	W2
Wild cards
5 (Note: Atlanta clinched the No. 5 seed over Detroit based on a head-to-head victory.)	Atlanta Falcons	South	10	6	0	.625	3–3	7–5	.480	.375	W1
6	Detroit Lions	North	10	6	0	.625	3–3	6–6	.535	.394	L1
Did not qualify for the postseason
7 (Note: Chicago finished ahead of Arizona based on common record (4–1 against 3–2 versus Philadelphia, Seattle, Carolina and Minnesota).)	Chicago Bears	North	8	8	0	.500	3–3	7–5	.527	.406	W1
8 (Note: Arizona finished ahead of Philadelphia based on a head-to-head victory.)	Arizona Cardinals	West	8	8	0	.500	4–2	7–5	.469	.391	W1
9 (Note: Philadelphia finished ahead of Dallas based on head-to-head sweep.)	Philadelphia Eagles	East	8	8	0	.500	5–1	6–6	.488	.398	W4
10	Dallas Cowboys	East	8	8	0	.500	2–4	6–6	.473	.375	L2
11	Seattle Seahawks	West	7	9	0	.438	3–3	6–6	.512	.438	L2
12	Carolina Panthers	South	6	10	0	.375	2–4	3–9	.504	.313	L1
13	Washington Redskins	East	5	11	0	.313	2–4	5–7	.477	.438	L2
14	Tampa Bay Buccaneers	South	4	12	0	.250	2–4	3–9	.551	.438	L10
15	Minnesota Vikings	North	3	13	0	.188	0–6	3–9	.559	.396	L1
16	St. Louis Rams	West	2	14	0	.125	0–6	1–11	.590	.531	L7
Tiebreakers (Note: When breaking ties for three or more teams under the NFL's rules, they are first broken within divisions, then comparing only the highest-ranked remaining team from each division.)

== Postseason ==
=== Playoffs bracket ===
Jan 8 – MetLife Stadium	Jan 15 – Lambeau Field
5	Atlanta	2
4	NY Giants	37
4	NY Giants	24	Jan 22 – Candlestick Park
1	Green Bay	20
NFC
Jan 7 – Mercedes-Benz Superdome	4	NY Giants	20*
Jan 14 – Candlestick Park
2	San Francisco	17
6	Detroit	28	NFC Championship
3	New Orleans	32
3	New Orleans	45	Feb 5 – Lucas Oil Stadium
2	San Francisco	36
Wild-card round
Divisional round
Jan 7 – Reliant Stadium	N4	NY Giants	21
Jan 15 – M&T Bank Stadium
A1	New England	17
6	Cincinnati	10	Super Bowl XLVI
3	Houston	13
3	Houston	31	Jan 22 – Gillette Stadium
2	Baltimore	20
AFC
Jan 8 – Sports Authority Field at Mile High	2	Baltimore	20
Jan 14 – Gillette Stadium
1	New England	23
5	Pittsburgh	23	AFC Championship
4	Denver	10
4	Denver	29*
1	New England	45

* Indicates overtime victory

== Records and milestones ==
- Most points in the Kickoff Game, single team: 42, Green Bay (vs. New Orleans, September 8, 2011)
- Most points in the Kickoff Game, total: 76, Green Bay (42) and New Orleans (34) – September 8, 2011
- Longest kick return (tie): 108 yards, Randall Cobb (Green Bay vs. New Orleans – September 8, 2011)
- Longest field goal (tie): 63 yards, Sebastian Janikowski (Oakland vs. Denver – September 12, 2011)
- Most combined passing yards in a single game, broken twice:
  - 933, Tom Brady (New England, 517) and Chad Henne (Miami, 416) – September 12, 2011
  - 1,000, Matthew Stafford (Detroit, 520) and Matt Flynn (Green Bay, 480) – January 1, 2012
- Most yards thrown by a rookie quarterback in his first game: 422, Cam Newton (Carolina vs. Arizona)
- Most passing yards, rookie, season: 4,051, Cam Newton, Carolina
- Most yards thrown by a quarterback, first two games of the season, broken twice:
  - 854 yards, Cam Newton (September 18, 2011), Carolina, stands as record for a rookie
  - 940 yards, Tom Brady (September 18, 2011), New England Patriots
- Most consecutive second-half drives to end in touchdowns: 5, Buffalo (vs. Oakland, September 18, 2011)
- Largest point margin prior to a successful comeback in consecutive games, modern era, broken twice:
  - 18, Buffalo (18 vs. Oakland, 21 vs. New England)
  - 20, Detroit (20 vs. Minnesota, 24 vs. Dallas)
- Most field goals of 50 or more yards, single game (tied twice):
  - 3, Sebastian Janikowski, Oakland (54, 55, and 50; vs. Houston, October 9, 2011)
  - 3, Josh Scobee, Jacksonville (54, 54, and 51; vs. Baltimore, October 24, 2011)
- Highest net punting average for a season: 43.99 yards, Andy Lee, San Francisco
- Longest game-winning punt return touchdown in overtime: 99 yards, Patrick Peterson, Arizona (vs. St. Louis, November 6, 2011)
- Most punt returns in a season for touchdown (tied): 4, Patrick Peterson, Arizona
- Most punt return yards by a rookie in a season: 699, Patrick Peterson, Arizona
- Most field goals in a season: 44, David Akers, San Francisco
- Most points in a season without a touchdown: 166, David Akers, San Francisco
- Most rushing touchdowns by a quarterback in a season: 14, Cam Newton, Carolina
- Most passing yards in a season: 5,476, Drew Brees, New Orleans.
  - Tom Brady, New England (5,235) and Matthew Stafford, Detroit (5,038) also passed for more than 5,000 yards marking the 4th and 5th times an individual has reached that milestone in NFL history, and the first time more than one person has done it in a single season.
- Fewest turnovers in a season (tied): 10, San Francisco
- The 2011 Saints broke many offensive records on January 1, 2012:
  - Most net yardage of offense in a season: 7,474
  - Most net yards passing: 5,347
  - Most completions: 472
  - Highest completion percentage (team) for the season: 71.3
  - Fewest fumbles in a season: 6
  - Most first downs for the season: 416
  - Most passing first downs in a season: 280
  - Most kick-offs resulting in a touchback, season: 62
  - Highest third down conversion percentage: 57.9%
- The 2011 Raiders also broke a few records:
  - Most penalties, season: 163
  - Most yards penalized, season: 1,358
- Most all purpose yards in a season: 2,696, Darren Sproles, New Orleans
- Most receiving yards by a tight end in a season, broken twice:
  - 1310, (Jimmy Graham, New Orleans vs. Carolina)
  - 1327, (Rob Gronkowski, New England vs. Buffalo)
- Most games, 300+ yards passing, season: 13, Drew Brees, New Orleans
- Most consecutive 300+ yards passing games: 7, Drew Brees, New Orleans
- Punt return touchdowns, career: 12, Devin Hester, Chicago
- Most consecutive games, 100+ passer rating, season: 12, Aaron Rodgers, Green Bay
- Highest passer rating, season: 122.5, Aaron Rodgers, Green Bay
- Most field goals of 50 or more yards, season, all teams: 90
- Highest field goals of 50 or more yards percentage, season, all teams: 63.8
- Highest completion percentage (individual), season: 71.2, Drew Brees, New Orleans
- Longest pass completion (tied twice):
  - 99, Tom Brady, New England (vs. Miami, September 12, 2011)
  - 99, Eli Manning, New York Giants (vs. New York Jets, December 24, 2011)
- Most consecutive games, 2+ touchdown passes (tied): 13, Aaron Rodgers, Green Bay
- Most times finished in the first place: 23, New York Giants

=== Playoff records & milestones ===
- Most offensive yards in a single playoff game: 627, New Orleans (vs. Detroit, Wild Card January 7, 2012)
- First quarterback to reach 400+ yards in two consecutive postseason games: Drew Brees, New Orleans (First time: 2010 vs. Seattle; 2nd time: 2011 vs. Detroit – both Wild Card games)
- Most first downs (tie): 34, New Orleans (vs. Detroit, Wild Card January 7, 2012)
- Most receiving yards in a playoff debut: 210, Calvin Johnson, Detroit (vs. New Orleans, Wild Card January 7, 2012)
- Most consecutive playoff games lost (tie): 7, Detroit Lions
- Tim Tebow's game-winning pass to Demaryius Thomas for Denver (vs. Pittsburgh, Wild Card January 8, 2012) set several records:
  - Longest scoring play in a playoff overtime: 80 yards
  - Shortest time of a drive in regular and postseason overtime: 11 seconds
  - Quickest win in overtime: 11 seconds
- Most playoff appearances: 31, New York Giants
- Most completions to start a super bowl: 9, Eli Manning
- Most passing yards in a single postseason: 1,219, Eli Manning
- Most touchdown passes in a single playoff game (tie): 6, Tom Brady, New England
- Most league championship game appearances: 19, New York Giants
- Most Super Bowls Started as QB (tie): 5, Tom Brady
- Record for most yards per completion (31.6) in an NFL playoff game Tim Tebow
- 3rd player in NFL playoff history to pass for 300 yards, and rush for 50 yards. Tim Tebow
- Most Super Bowls lost (tie): 4, New England Patriots
- Most playoff games won starting QB (tie): 16, Tom Brady

== Regular season statistical leaders ==
Individual
Scoring leader	David Akers, San Francisco (166)
Touchdowns	LeSean McCoy, Philadelphia (20 TDs)
Most field goals made	David Akers, San Francisco (44 FGs)
Rushing	Maurice Jones-Drew, Jacksonville (1,606 yards)
Passing touchdowns	Drew Brees, New Orleans (46 TDs)
Passing yards	Drew Brees, New Orleans (5,476 yards)
Passer rating	Aaron Rodgers, Green Bay (122.5 rating)
Pass receptions	Wes Welker, New England (122 catches)
Pass receiving yards	Calvin Johnson, Lions (1,681 yards)
Combined tackles	London Fletcher, Washington (166 tackles)
Interceptions	Kyle Arrington, New England, Eric Weddle, San Diego and Charles Woodson, Green Bay (7)
Punting	Britton Colquitt, Denver (4,783 yards, 47.2 average yards)
Sacks	Jared Allen, Minnesota (22)

== Awards ==
=== All-Pro Team ===
The following players were named first team All-Pro by the Associated Press:

Offense
Quarterback	Aaron Rodgers, Green Bay
Running back	Maurice Jones-Drew, Jacksonville; LeSean McCoy, Philadelphia
Fullback	Vonta Leach, Baltimore
Wide receiver	Calvin Johnson, Detroit; Wes Welker, New England
Tight end	Rob Gronkowski, New England
Offensive tackle	Jason Peters, Philadelphia; Joe Thomas, Cleveland
Offensive guard	Carl Nicks, New Orleans; Jahri Evans, New Orleans
Center	Maurkice Pouncey, Pittsburgh

Defense
Defensive end	Jared Allen, Minnesota; Jason Pierre-Paul, N.Y. Giants
Defensive tackle	Haloti Ngata, Baltimore; Justin Smith, San Francisco
Outside linebacker	Terrell Suggs, Baltimore; DeMarcus Ware, Dallas
Inside linebacker	Patrick Willis, San Francisco; NaVorro Bowman, San Francisco; Derrick Johnson, Kansas City
Cornerback	Charles Woodson, Green Bay; Darrelle Revis, N.Y. Jets
Safety	Troy Polamalu, Pittsburgh; Eric Weddle, San Diego

Special teams
Kicker	David Akers, San Francisco
Punter	Andy Lee, San Francisco
Kick returner	Patrick Peterson, Arizona

=== Players of the Week/Month ===
The following were named the top performers during the 2011 season:

Week/ Month	Offensive Player of the Week/Month		Defensive Player of the Week/Month		Special Teams Player of the Week/Month	
Week/ Month	AFC	NFC	AFC	NFC	AFC	NFC
1	Tom Brady (Patriots)	Aaron Rodgers (Packers)	Terrell Suggs (Ravens)	Brian Urlacher (Bears)	Sebastian Janikowski (Raiders)	Ted Ginn Jr. (49ers)
2	Tom Brady (Patriots)	Tony Romo (Cowboys)	Antonio Cromartie (Jets)	Roman Harper (Saints)	Josh Cribbs (Browns)	Jason Hanson (Lions)
3	Darren McFadden	Eli Manning	Ray Lewis	Ronde Barber	Rian Lindell	Dan Bailey
Sept.	Ryan Fitzpatrick	Aaron Rodgers	D'Qwell Jackson	Sean Lee	Sebastian Janikowski	Jason Hanson
4	Arian Foster	Aaron Rodgers	Jarret Johnson	Brian Orakpo	Ryan Succop	Devin Hester
5	Ben Roethlisberger	Adrian Peterson	George Wilson	Patrick Willis	Sebastian Janikowski	Mason Crosby
6	Rashard Mendenhall	Ahmad Bradshaw	Darrelle Revis	Kurt Coleman	Jacoby Ford	Devin Hester
7	Arian Foster	Drew Brees	Brandon Flowers	Lance Briggs	Josh Scobee	Mason Crosby
8	Ben Roethlisberger	LeSean McCoy	Derrick Johnson	Cliff Avril	Brandon Tate	Robert Quinn
Oct.	Arian Foster	Aaron Rodgers	LaMarr Woodley	Jared Allen	Joe McKnight	Devin Hester
9	Matt Moore	Aaron Rodgers	David Harris	Mathias Kiwanuka	Eddie Royal	Patrick Peterson
10	Michael Bush	Larry Fitzgerald	Andre Carter	Roman Harper	Marc Mariani	Devin Hester
11	Torrey Smith	Kevin Smith	Von Miller	Chris Clemons	Julian Edelman	Kealoha Pilares
12	Chris Johnson	Drew Brees	Terrell Suggs	DeAngelo Hall	Sebastian Janikowski	Patrick Peterson
Nov.	Tom Brady	Aaron Rodgers	Connor Barwin	Julius Peppers	Sebastian Janikowski	Patrick Peterson
13	Ray Rice	Cam Newton	Colin McCarthy	David Hawthorne	Antonio Brown	Tim Masthay
14	Rob Gronkowski	Matt Ryan	Terrell Suggs	Jason Pierre-Paul	Matt Prater	Doug Baldwin
15	Reggie Bush	Calvin Johnson	Antwan Barnes	John Abraham	Ryan Succop	Andy Lee
16	Tom Brady	Drew Brees	Robert Mathis	Jason Pierre-Paul	Richard Seymour	David Akers
17	Ray Rice	Matt Flynn	Troy Polamalu	Curtis Lofton	Richard Goodman	David Akers
Dec.	Tom Brady	Drew Brees	Terrell Suggs	Jason Pierre-Paul	Matt Prater	David Akers

Week	FedEx Air Player of the Week (quarterbacks)	FedEx Ground Player of the Week (running backs)	Pepsi Rookie of the Week
1	Tom Brady (NE)	LeSean McCoy (Phi)	WR Randall Cobb (GB)
2	Matthew Stafford (Det)	Fred Jackson (Buf)	WR Denarius Moore (Oak)
3	Joe Flacco (Bal)	Darren McFadden (Oak)	OL Stefen Wisniewski (Oak)
4	Aaron Rodgers (GB)	Matt Forté (Chi)	QB Cam Newton (Car)
5	Aaron Rodgers (GB)	Adrian Peterson (Min)	LB Aldon Smith (SF)
6	Aaron Rodgers (GB)	Frank Gore (SF)	LB Aldon Smith (SF)
7	Aaron Rodgers (GB)	DeMarco Murray (Dal)	RB DeMarco Murray (Dal)
8	Ben Roethlisberger (Pit)	LeSean McCoy (Phi)	DE Marcell Dareus (Buf)
9	Aaron Rodgers (GB)	Willis McGahee (Den)	QB Andy Dalton (Cin)
10	Tony Romo (Dal)	Michael Bush (Oak)	WR Denarius Moore (Oak)
11	Matthew Stafford (Det)	Kevin Smith (Det)	WR Torrey Smith (Bal)
12	Drew Brees (NO)	Beanie Wells (Ari)	QB Andy Dalton (Cin)
13	Aaron Rodgers (GB)	Ray Rice (Bal)	LB Colin McCarthy (Ten)
14	Matt Ryan (Atl)	Marshawn Lynch (Sea)	QB T. J. Yates (Hou)
15	Drew Brees (NO)	Reggie Bush (Mia)	QB Cam Newton (Car)
16	Drew Brees (NO)	C. J. Spiller (Buf)	QB Cam Newton (Car)
17	Matt Flynn (GB)	Ray Rice (Bal)	DB Sterling Moore (NE)

Month	Rookie of the Month	
Month	Offensive	Defensive
Sept.	Cam Newton	Ryan Kerrigan
Oct.	Andy Dalton	Aldon Smith
Nov.	DeMarco Murray	Von Miller
Dec.	Julio Jones	Aldon Smith

=== Regular-season awards ===
For the first time, the league held the NFL Honors, an awards show to salute the best players and plays for the season. The 1st NFL Honors was held at the Murat Theatre in Indianapolis, Indiana on February 4, 2012.

Award	Winner	Position	Team
AP Offensive Player of the Year	Drew Brees	Quarterback	New Orleans Saints
AP Defensive Player of the Year	Terrell Suggs	Linebacker	Baltimore Ravens
AP Coach of the Year	Jim Harbaugh	Head coach	San Francisco 49ers
AP Offensive Rookie of the Year	Cam Newton	Quarterback	Carolina Panthers
AP Defensive Rookie of the Year	Von Miller	Linebacker	Denver Broncos
AP Comeback Player of the Year	Matthew Stafford	Quarterback	Detroit Lions
AP Most Valuable Player	Aaron Rodgers	Quarterback	Green Bay Packers
Pepsi Rookie of the Year	Cam Newton	Quarterback	Carolina Panthers
Walter Payton NFL Man of the Year	Matt Birk	Center	Baltimore Ravens
Super Bowl Most Valuable Player	Eli Manning	Quarterback	New York Giants

=== Team superlatives ===
==== Offense ====
- Most points scored: Green Bay, 560 (35.0 PPG)
- Fewest points scored: St. Louis, 193 (12.1 PPG)
- Most total offensive yards: New Orleans, 7,474
- Fewest total offensive yards: Jacksonville, 4,149
- Most total passing yards: New Orleans, 5,347
- Fewest total passing yards: Jacksonville, 2,179
- Most rushing yards: Denver, 2,632
- Fewest rushing yards: New York Giants, 1,427

==== Defense ====
- Fewest points allowed: Pittsburgh, 227 (14.2 PPG)
- Most points allowed: Tampa Bay, 494 (30.9 PPG)
- Fewest total yards allowed: Pittsburgh, 4,348
- Most total yards allowed: Green Bay, 6,585
- Fewest passing yards allowed: Pittsburgh, 2,751
- Most passing yards allowed: Green Bay, 4,796
- Fewest rushing yards allowed: San Francisco, 1,236
- Most rushing yards allowed: Tampa Bay, 2,497

== Head coach/front office changes ==
=== Head coach ===
Offseason

The uncertain labor issues and the possibility of a lockout were speculated to have a minimizing effect on coaching changes prior to the 2011 season, with owners predicted to be more hesitant than usual to hire a high-price, high-profile head coach. Nevertheless, eight coaches were fired either during or immediately after the 2010 NFL season, compared to three in the year prior; only one of the new hires (John Fox) had ever been a head coach in the NFL prior to their hirings or promotions. However, Leslie Frazier, and Jason Garrett did get some experience as interim coaches during the 2010 season, with Garrett being successful in his debut season, going 5–3 in his tenure, improving the 1–7 Cowboys to a 6–10 season.

Team:	2010 head coach: at start of season	2010 interim head coach:	2011 replacement:	Reason for leaving:	Notes:
Dallas Cowboys	Wade Phillips	Jason Garrett		Fired	Phillips, son of former NFL head coach Bum Phillips, was fired on November 8, 2010, following a 45–7 Week 9 loss against the Green Bay Packers, leaving Dallas with a 35–24 (.593) record. Phillips was later hired as defensive coordinator of the Houston Texans. On January 5, 2011, Jason Garrett, the team's offensive coordinator and presumptive head coach in waiting, was named the Head coach for the 2011 season.
Minnesota Vikings	Brad Childress	Leslie Frazier		Fired	Childress was fired on November 22, 2010, following a Week 11 loss against the Green Bay Packers, 31–3. The Vikings entered week 12 with a 3–7 record, second-to-last in the NFC North after a 12–4 season a year ago. Childress also faced controversy by releasing Randy Moss without the approval of owner Zygi Wilf and lost control over the locker room. Childress amassed a record of 40–37 (.519) record during his time in Minnesota. Frazier, the Vikings' defensive coordinator since 2007, was named head coach following the end of the 2010 season.
Denver Broncos	Josh McDaniels	Eric Studesville (retained as running back coach)	John Fox	Fired	McDaniels was fired on December 5, 2010, following a 10–6 loss to the Kansas City Chiefs in Week 13. After a 6–0 start in the 2009 season, the Broncos lost 17 of their next 22 games, and became subject to a videotaping scandal. McDaniels's record was 11–17 (.393) as coach of the Broncos. McDaniels was later hired by the St. Louis Rams to be their offensive coordinator.
San Francisco 49ers	Mike Singletary	Jim Tomsula (retained as defensive line coach)	Jim Harbaugh	Fired	Singletary compiled a record of 18–22 (.462) during his 2½ years as head coach of the 49ers and was criticized for his lack of focus on the team's offense. Singletary is now the Linebackers coach for the Minnesota Vikings. Harbaugh, a former NFL quarterback, came from the Stanford Cardinal football team, where he led the Cardinal to a 12–1 record in 2010 behind the arm of top quarterback prospect Andrew Luck, culminating in a victory in the Orange Bowl. (Luck was expected to declare for the 2011 NFL draft if Harbaugh left, but decided to stay at Stanford.)
Carolina Panthers	John Fox		Ron Rivera	Expired contract	The Panthers announced on December 31, 2010, two days before the final game of the 2010 season, that his contract will not be renewed for 2011. Fox spent nine seasons with Carolina, including an appearance in Super Bowl XXXVIII, and leaves Carolina with a total record of 78–76 (.506). Rivera had spent the previous three seasons as defensive coordinator for the San Diego Chargers.
Cleveland Browns	Eric Mangini		Pat Shurmur	Fired	The Browns announced on Monday January 3, 2011, the day after the end of the 2010 regular season that Eric Mangini will not be returning to coach the Browns. Mangini led the Browns to back to back 5–11 seasons and an overall record of 10–22 (.313), the second-worst in Browns history. Mangini is currently an analyst for ESPN. On January 13, the Browns announced that they hired Pat Shurmur, a career assistant coach who spent the last two seasons on the staff of the St. Louis Rams and from 1999 to 2008 on the staff of the Philadelphia Eagles.
Oakland Raiders	Tom Cable		Hue Jackson	Expired contract	The Raiders announced on Tuesday January 4, 2011, that they will not exercise the option on Tom Cable's contract. He finishes with a 17–27 (.386) record, which included an 8–8 record in 2010, while going undefeated against division rivals, being the first team to go 6–0 against division opponents and miss the playoffs. On January 17, the Raiders announced that Hue Jackson, their previous offensive coordinator will replace Cable, who was later hired as the assistant head coach/offensive line coach for the Seattle Seahawks.
Tennessee Titans	Jeff Fisher		Mike Munchak	Resigned	On January 27, it was formally announced by the Tennessee Titans that Jeff Fisher would not return to coach the team in 2011, following a dispute with quarterback Vince Young. Fisher, whose time with the team dated back to when it was still the Houston Oilers, had the longest tenure as head coach with one team among active head coaches in the league at the time of his dismissal. In 17 years with the Oilers and Titans, Fisher compiled a record of 147–126 (.538) and led the Titans to Super Bowl XXXIV. Mike Munchak, who joined the Oilers in 1982 and has remained with the team as a player or coach every year since (serving most recently as offensive line coach), was promoted to the head coach position as Fisher's replacement.

In-season

The following head coaches were replaced in-season:

Team:	2011 head coach:	Interim head coach:	Reason for leaving:	Notes:
Jacksonville Jaguars	Jack Del Rio	Mel Tucker	Fired	Del Rio was fired after compiling a 69–73 (.486) record (including postseason games) in 8¾ seasons as head coach; the team has not made the playoffs since 2007. Del Rio was fired at the same time that Wayne Weaver, the owner of the Jaguars, announced his intentions to sell the team to Pakistani-American automotive parts builder Shahid Khan.
Kansas City Chiefs	Todd Haley	Romeo Crennel	Fired	Haley compiled a 19–27 (.413) record, including one postseason loss, in nearly 3 seasons with the Chiefs. Team ownership cited inconsistent play and a lack of progress in their decision; Haley was also cited for an unsportsmanlike conduct penalty in what turned out to be his final game. Crennel had previously served as head coach of the Cleveland Browns from 2005 to 2008. Crennel won his first game as the interim head coach of the Chiefs on December 18, 2011, against the then undefeated Green Bay Packers 19–14, which was significant as Crennel snapped the Packers' 19-game winning streak and ended their hopes for a perfect season. Crennel finished his stint as interim head coach with a 2–1 record. On January 9, 2012, Crennel was named the team's permanent head coach.
Miami Dolphins	Tony Sparano	Todd Bowles	Fired	Sparano compiled a 29–33 (.468) record, including one postseason loss, in nearly 4 seasons with the Dolphins. Ongoing speculation regarding Sparano's future in Miami prompted Dolphins owner Stephen Ross to dismiss Sparano prior to the end of the season instead of letting the speculation become a further distraction. The Dolphins intend on hiring someone from outside the organization in the 2012 offseason.

=== Front office ===
Offseason

Team	2010 office holder	Reason for leaving	2011 replacement	Notes
San Francisco 49ers	Trent Baalke (de facto)	Promoted	Trent Baalke	Baalke had already served as de facto general manager during the 2010 season after the resignation of Scot McCloughan in March 2010. Baalke's official promotion to general manager comes in anticipation of needing an official general manager to lure Jim Harbaugh away from Stanford for the vacant coaching position.
Denver Broncos	Brian Xanders	Is now co-GM	John Elway/Brian Xanders	On January 5, 2011, Elway was named general manager and executive vice president of football operations of the Broncos, with the final say in all football matters. In this capacity, he reports to team president Joe Ellis and is the immediate supervisor for the head coach of the team. General manager Brian Xanders was actually retained, but serves mostly in an advisory role to Elway.

In-season

Team	Position	Departing office holder	Reason for leaving	Interim replacement	Notes
Oakland Raiders	GM	Al Davis	Death	Hue Jackson (de facto)	On October 8, one day before the team's Week 5 game at the Houston Texans, owner Al Davis died in his Oakland, California home at the age of 82. After his death, head coach Hue Jackson essentially gained control over the entire organization.

== Stadiums ==
=== Naming rights agreements ===
The following stadiums received new naming rights:

- April 27: The Oakland-Alameda County Coliseum, home of the Oakland Raiders, was renamed Overstock.com Coliseum, and later shortened to O.co Coliseum. The Raiders' home field has undergone several name changes in its history, including Network Associates Coliseum (1998–2004) and McAfee Coliseum (2004–2008).
- June 20: Qwest Field, the home of the Seattle Seahawks since 2002, was renamed CenturyLink Field. Qwest's naming rights to the Seahawks' home field was set to expire in 2014.
- August 16: INVESCO Field at Mile High, the home of the Denver Broncos, was renamed Sports Authority Field at Mile High. Invesco held the original naming rights to the Broncos' home field since it opened in 2001, and Invesco's naming rights agreement was set to expire in 2021. Sports Authority, a sporting goods retailer based in Englewood, Colorado, took over the naming rights, and agreed to pay $6 million per year for the naming rights to the Broncos' home field.
- August 23: Life insurance company MetLife purchased the naming rights to the New Meadowlands Stadium, the new home field of the New York Jets and New York Giants that opened in 2010, renaming it MetLife Stadium. The life insurance company signed a 25-year, $17 million per year agreement with the Jets and Giants for the stadium's naming rights.
- October 4: German automaker Mercedes-Benz purchased the naming rights to the Louisiana Superdome, home of the New Orleans Saints. The Saints' home field was officially renamed the Mercedes-Benz Superdome prior to the Saints' Week 7 home game vs. the Indianapolis Colts.

In addition, the San Diego Chargers' home field, Qualcomm Stadium, was temporarily renamed "Snapdragon Stadium" for a ten-day period from December 16–25, which included the team's Week 15 home game vs. the Baltimore Ravens, as a marketing tie in for Qualcomm's Snapdragon brand.

== Uniforms ==
This was the last season that Reebok exclusively supplied uniforms and sideline caps along with performance and fan apparel for all 32 teams in the league, as Nike and New Era now have the 40-year rights to manufacture on-field uniforms and fan apparel, with Nike handling uniforms and performance apparel, and New Era with on-field caps. For Reebok, this ends a 10-year exclusivity association that began in 2001.

The first Sunday of the season fell on the tenth anniversary of the September 11 attacks. To commemorate that event players, coaches, game officials and sideline personnel all wore a special stars and stripes ribbon bearing the dates "9/11/01" and "9/11/11" as a patch or pin. Players were also allowed to wear special red, white and blue gloves and shoes.

The Buffalo Bills introduced redesigned uniforms on June 24, 2011. Early rumors fueled by a Madden NFL 12 trailer featuring a Bills throwback uniform had indicated the team would be adopting the uniforms the team wore between 1975 and 1983; the final product indeed resembled those uniforms, with some minor adjustments. The new uniforms (which marked the first redesign since 2002) were unveiled at a fan appreciation event at Ralph Wilson Stadium. The Bills wore their white "away" uniforms in their week nine home game against the New York Jets as part of a whiteout promotion; the last time the team had worn their white uniforms at home was in 1986.

The New England Patriots' uniforms bore a patch bearing the initials "MHK" in honor of team owner Robert Kraft's wife Myra Kraft who died of cancer in July. The Patriots wore their red throwback uniforms in their week five game against the New York Jets. They wore their white jerseys at home against the Dallas Cowboys in week six, thus forcing the Cowboys to use their navy jerseys for the only time all season and the first time since 2009. As per tradition, the Cowboys wore their throwbacks on Thanksgiving Day (November 24) at home against the Miami Dolphins.

The St. Louis Rams wore their throwback uniforms in week 8 against the New Orleans Saints; the date was determined by fan voting.

The Baltimore Ravens wore their black alternative jerseys twice in 2011: with black pants against the Jets and with white pants against the 49ers.

The Tampa Bay Buccaneers wore their orange throwback uniforms during week 13 against Carolina.

The Oakland Raiders wore stickers featuring "AL" on their helmets after owner Al Davis died on October 8, 2011.

This season was the last in which the Denver Broncos wore their navy blue jerseys as their primary jersey, as the team has designated their orange jerseys—the team's alternate home jersey since 2002—as their new primary home jersey color, beginning with the 2012 season. The move was made due to overwhelming fan support to return to using orange as the team's primary home jersey color, which harkens back to the days of the Orange Crush Defense, as well as John Elway's return to the organization as the team's executive vice president of football operations. The team had considered making the switch for the 2011 season, but were too late to notify the NFL of the changes. The team's navy blue jerseys, which had been their primary home jersey since they were first introduced in 1997, will become the alternate jerseys which will be worn in one or two home games each year.

This season was the last in which the Seattle Seahawks wore their pacific blue (or "Seahawks blue") jerseys as the team's home jersey, as the team changed their home jersey color to dark navy for the 2012 season.

== Media ==
This was the sixth season under the television contracts with the league's television partners: CBS (all AFC afternoon away games), Fox (all NFC afternoon away games), NBC (17 Sunday Night Football games and the kickoff game), ESPN (Monday Night Football), NFL Network (eight late-season games on Thursday night and Saturday nights), and DirecTV's NFL Sunday Ticket package. These contracts originally ran through at least 2013.

ESPN extended its contract for Monday Night Football on September 8, during the opening week of the season. This new contract, valued between $14.2 billion and $15.2 billion, extended ESPN's rights for eight seasons until 2021. It also gave them rights to expanded highlights, international and digital rights, the Pro Bowl beginning with the 2015 installment, and possibly a wild card playoff game. The league also signed a nine-year extension with CBS, Fox and NBC on their current contracts starting with the 2014 season through 2022.

CBS added Marv Albert as a commentator, while Gus Johnson departed from CBS to Fox Sports to call NFL and college football games. ESPN lost both of their sideline reporters from 2010: Michele Tafoya moved to NBC, where she replaced the departing Andrea Kremer, and Suzy Kolber reduced her on-field work to focus on hosting studio programming. ESPN, who had reduced the roles of its sideline reporters in recent years in response to NFL rule changes, used only one sideline reporter for each game of the 2011 season; among the rotating reporters include Kolber, Wendi Nix, Ed Werder, Sal Paolantonio, and Rachel Nichols. At NFL Network, Brad Nessler and Mike Mayock became its new broadcasting crew, replacing Bob Papa, Matt Millen, and Joe Theismann.

On December 22, 2010, the league announced that its national radio contract with Westwood One, which was acquired by Dial Global in the 2011 offseason, had been extended through 2014. The league also extended its contract with Sirius XM Radio through 2015. In addition to these contracts, and in a first for an NFL team, the Dallas Cowboys signed a deal to allow for nationwide broadcasts of all of its home and away games broadcast on Compass Media Networks, in addition to its existing local radio network. Compass also acquired exclusive national broadcast rights to both the International Series and Toronto Series contests.

The league did not announce plans to compensate their media partners had the season been shortened or canceled as a result of the work stoppage. NBC had ordered several low-cost reality television shows for the 2011–12 TV season in the event that Sunday Night Football could not be played, but other networks had not made public any contingency plans in the event NFL games could not be televised (in the case of CBS and Fox, the Sunday afternoon time slots could have been left unfilled and turned over to the affiliates, likely to be used for time buys by minor and extreme sports organizations, or locally programmed infomercials or movies as they are during the offseason). A work stoppage could have potentially cost these networks billions of dollars in ad revenue and other entertainment platforms that depend on the games being played. (Under the NFL's television contracts, the networks must still pay the league a rights fee regardless of whether or not the league plays any games; a March 2 ruling states that this money must be put into escrow and not be spent.) Meanwhile, the United Football League had set aside a portion of their television contract for their 2011 UFL season, as a potential package of replacement programs for the networks; while CBS and Fox briefly negotiated with the UFL regarding the package, neither network committed to carrying the games, forcing the UFL to postpone its season by a month.
