= Richard Goodman (American football) =

American football player (born 1987)

No. 15
- Position: Wide receiver/Return specialist/Gunner

Personal information
- Born: April 23, 1987 (age 39); Ft. Lauderdale, Florida, U.S.
- Listed height: 6 ft 0 in (1.83 m)
- Listed weight: 192 lb (87 kg)

Career information
- High school: St. Thomas Aquinas (Fort Lauderdale, Florida)
- College: Florida State
- NFL draft: 2010: undrafted

Career history
- San Diego Chargers (2010–2013)

Career NFL statistics
- Receptions: 1
- Receiving yards: 25
- Return yards: 1,433
- Return touchdowns: 1
- Stats at Pro Football Reference

Richard Goodman (born April 23, 1987) is an American former professional football player who was a wide receiver in the National Football League (NFL). He played college football for the Florida State Seminoles. Shortly after the 2010 NFL draft ended, Goodman joined the San Diego Chargers as an undrafted free agent.

== Personal life ==
Goodman was born in Ft. Lauderdale, Florida, on April 23, 1987. In 2005, he graduated from St. Thomas Aquinas High School. Goodman chose to attend to Florida State over Auburn and NC State.

== College career ==
Goodman had a few starts at Florida State Universiry, but was hindered mostly by injuries throughout his college career.

== Professional career ==
After going undrafted in the 2010 NFL draft, Goodman signed with the San Diego Chargers as an undrafted free agent on May 10, 2010; he was later cut and signed to the practice squad before the regular season.

Goodman was signed from the Chargers practice squad to the active roster on October 12, 2010, for a one-year contract. Goodman was cut by the Chargers on November 6, 2010 to make room for Steve Gregory, who was returning from a suspension. Goodman was re-signed to the Chargers' practice squad. On January 1, 2012, Goodman returned a second quarter kickoff for a touchdown against the Oakland Raiders. It was the first Chargers' kickoff return for a touchdown since 2008.

On September 2, 2013, Goodman was released by the Chargers.
