= Danario Alexander =

American football player (born 1988)

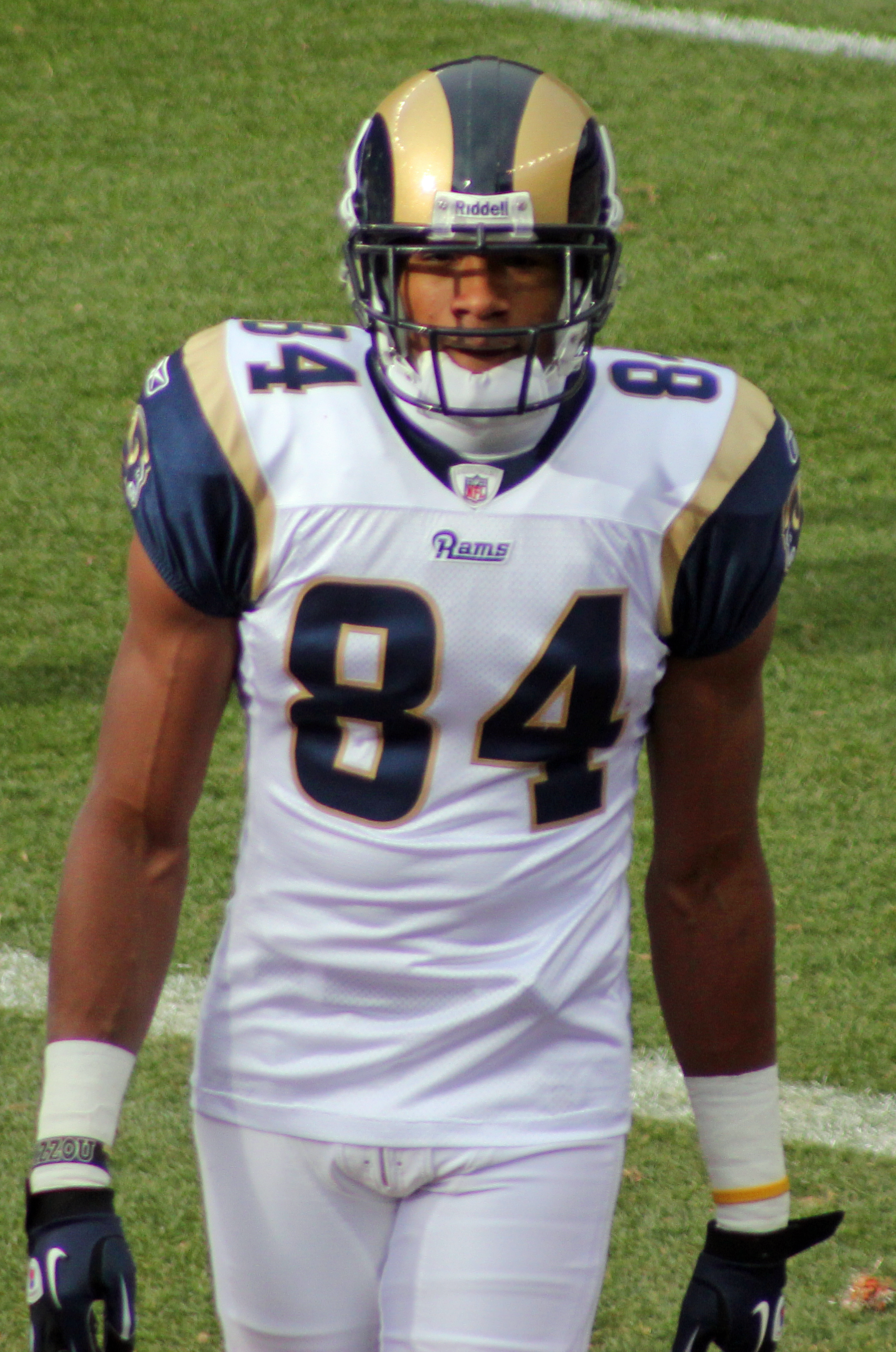
- Alexander with the St. Louis Rams in 2010

No. 84
- Position: Wide receiver

Personal information
- Born: August 7, 1988 (age 38); Waco, Texas, U.S.
- Listed height: 6 ft 5 in (1.96 m)
- Listed weight: 217 lb (98 kg)

Career information
- High school: Marlin (TX)
- College: Missouri (2006–2009)
- NFL draft: 2010: undrafted

Career history
- St. Louis Rams (2010–2011); San Diego Chargers (2012–2013)

Awards and highlights
- First-team All-American (2009)

Career NFL statistics
- Receptions: 83
- Receiving yards: 1,395
- Receiving touchdowns: 10
- Stats at Pro Football Reference

Danario Alexander (born August 7, 1988) is an American former professional football player who was a wide receiver in the National Football League (NFL). He played college football for the Missouri Tigers.

== Early life ==
Alexander earned honorable mention All-State and First-team All-District honors as a senior wide receiver for Marlin High School in 2005 after catching 49 passes for 850 yards and nine touchdowns. He was named Second-team Super Cen-Tex in 2005 as well as an honorable mention All-District pick as a junior in 2004. Alexander was an excellent all-around athlete who was a First-team All-District performer in baseball and was also the State champion in the triple jump (personal best of 49 ft 5 in or 15.06 m) and State runner-up in the long jump (PB of 24 ft 6 in or 7.47 m) in 2006.

== College career ==
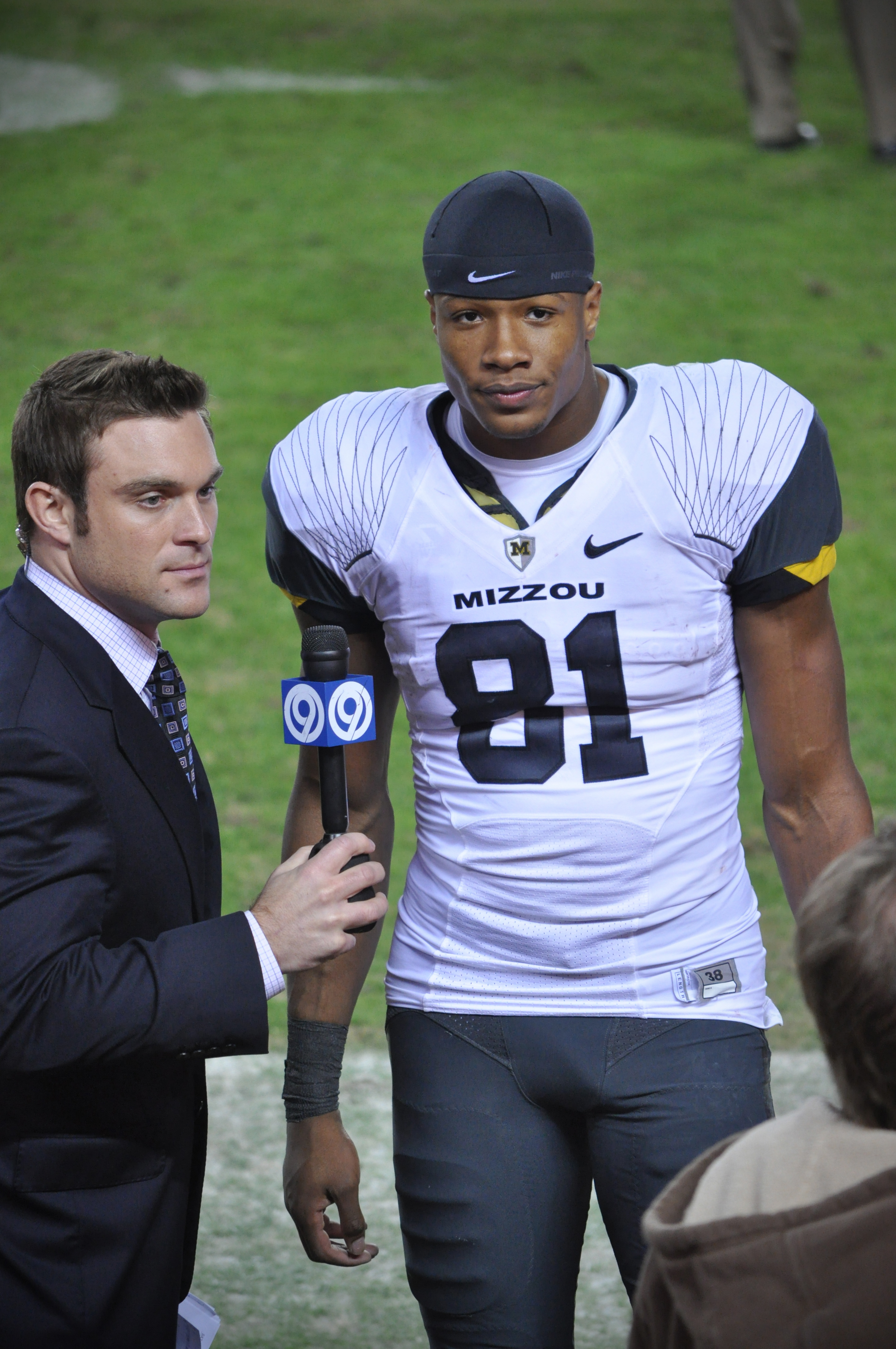
Alexander as a college player.

As a true freshman for Missouri in 2006, Alexander played in all 13 games and finished with 15 receptions for 251 yards and a touchdown. As a sophomore in 2007 he missed three games due to an injury to his left wrist. He finished the season starting two of 10 games, recording 37 receptions for 417 yards and two touchdowns. As a junior in 2008 he played 10 of 13 games starting one and finished with 26 receptions for 329 yards and five touchdowns. As a senior, he started all 13 games (including the 2009 Texas Bowl), and finished with 113 receptions for an NCAA best 1,781 yards and 14 touchdowns, averaging 15.8 yards per reception and 137 yards per game. He was named a 2009 Sports Illustrated first-team All American. On February 25, 2016, he was inducted into the University of Missouri Intercollegiate Athletics Hall of Fame.

=== Collegiate statistics ===
Danario Alexander	Receiving				
Year	G	Rec	Yds	Avg	TD
2006	12	15	251	16.7	1
2007	10	37	417	11.3	2
2008	12	26	329	12.7	5
2009	13	113	1,781	15.8	14
Career	47	191	2,778	14.5	22

== Professional career ==
=== Pre-draft ===
A mid-round draft prospect, Alexander went undrafted, mainly due to surgery on his left knee in February 2010 to repair an injury during the week of the Senior Bowl. He was unable to work out at the NFL Combine or his pro day at the University of Missouri.

=== St. Louis Rams ===
On August 22, 2010, Alexander signed a contract with the St. Louis Rams. On September 4, he was cut. However, Alexander was signed to the Rams' practice squad. On October 11, 2010, he was signed to the Rams' active roster in place of the injured Mark Clayton.

Alexander scored his first NFL touchdown on October 17, 2010, catching a 38-yard pass from Rams quarterback Sam Bradford. On that day, which was also his NFL debut, he caught four passes for 72 yards and one touchdown. He played in eight games and started two as a rookie. He finished with 20 receptions for 306 yards and a touchdown.

In Week 2 of the 2011 season, Alexander had three receptions for 122 receiving yards and one touchdown in a 28–16 loss to the New York Giants. In the 2011 season, Alexander had 26 receptions for 431 receiving yards and two receiving touchdowns in ten games and five starts.

Prior to the 2012 season, Alexander was waived by the Rams.

=== San Diego Chargers ===
On October 18, 2012, Alexander signed with the San Diego Chargers. On November 11, Alexander had five receptions for 134 yards, including an 80-yard touchdown against the Tampa Bay Buccaneers. Over the course of the rest of the regular season, he had two games, one against the Denver Broncos and one against the Pittsburgh Steelers, where he scored two receiving touchdowns in each. In ten games in the 2012 season, Alexander had 37 receptions for 658 yards and seven touchdowns.

On August 6, 2013, Alexander suffered a torn right ACL during practice and was expected to miss the entire 2013 season. On August 16, 2013, Alexander was waived-injured by the Chargers. On August 19, 2013, he was placed on the injured reserve list after clearing waivers.

== Personal life ==
Alexander is married and has one daughter.

== See also ==
- List of NCAA major college football yearly receiving leaders
