= 2012 San Diego Chargers season =

NFL team 53rd season

- Owner: Alex Spanos
- General manager: A. J. Smith
- Head coach: Norv Turner
- Home stadium: Qualcomm Stadium

Results
- Record: 7–9
- Division place: 2nd AFC West
- Playoffs: Did not qualify
- All-Pros: 1: S Eric Weddle (2nd team)
- Pro Bowlers: None

The 2012 season was the San Diego Chargers' 43rd in the National Football League (NFL), their 53rd overall and their sixth and final season under head coach Norv Turner. The Chargers failed to improve on their 8–8 record from 2011 and missed the playoffs for a third consecutive season, resulting in Turner's firing on December 31, 2012. General manager A. J. Smith was also fired after ten seasons. This was also the Chargers' first losing season since 2003 and the first losing season in the Philip Rivers era and the last team without Keenan Allen until the 2024 season. 2012 would mark the last season that the Chargers would start 2–0 until 2024.

== Offseason ==
=== Signings ===
Position	Player	2011 Team	Contract
WR	Robert Meachem	New Orleans Saints	4 years, $25.9 million
OLB	Jarret Johnson	Baltimore Ravens	4 years, $19 million
WR	Eddie Royal	Denver Broncos	3 years, $13.5 million
FB	Le'Ron McClain	Kansas City Chiefs	3 years, $8.25 million
QB	Charlie Whitehurst	Seattle Seahawks	2 years, $3.05 million
S	Atari Bigby	Seattle Seahawks	2 years, $2.5 million
RB	Ronnie Brown	Philadelphia Eagles	1 year, $1 million
G	Rex Hadnot	Arizona Cardinals	1 year, $890,000
TE	Dante Rosario	Miami Dolphins	1 year, $700,000

=== Departures ===
Position	Player	2012 Team
WR	Vincent Jackson	Tampa Bay Buccaneers
FB	Mike Tolbert	Carolina Panthers
S	Steve Gregory	New England Patriots
WR	Micheal Spurlock	Jacksonville Jaguars
OLB	Everette Brown	Detroit Lions

== NFL draft ==
2012 San Diego Chargers draft
Round	Pick	Player	Position	College	Notes
1	18	Melvin Ingram *	DE	South Carolina	
2	49	Kendall Reyes	DT	Connecticut	
3	73	Brandon Taylor	S	LSU	from Carolina via Chicago and Miami (Note: No. 73: multiple trades: No. 73: Carolina → Chicago (PD). Carolina traded this selection to Chicago for tight end Greg Olsen. No. 73: Chicago → Miami (PD). Chicago traded this selection and a 2013 third-round selection (82nd) to Miami for wide receiver Brandon Marshall. No. 73: Miami → San Diego (D). Miami traded this selection to San Diego for their third (78th) and sixth round (183rd) selections.)
4	110	Ladarius Green	TE	Louisiana-Lafayette	
5	149	Johnnie Troutman	G	Penn State	
7	226	David Molk	C	Michigan	
7	250	Edwin Baker	RB	Michigan State	
Made roster † Pro Football Hall of Fame * Made at least one Pro Bowl during career

== Staff ==
2012 San Diego Chargers staff
Front office: Owner – Alex Spanos; Chairman/president – Dean Spanos; Executive vice president – Michael Spanos; Executive vice president/CEO – A. G. Spanos; Executive vice president/general manager – A. J. Smith; Executive vice president of football operations/assistant general manager – Ed McGuire; Senior executive – Randy Mueller; Director of player personnel – Jimmy Raye; Director of pro scouting – Dennis Abraham; Director of college scouting – John Spanos; Assistant director of pro scouting – Bryan Cox; Assistant director of college scouting – Mike Biehl; Head coaches: Head coach – Norv Turner; Offensive coaches: Offensive coordinator/offensive line – Hal Hunter; Quarterbacks – John Ramsdell; Running backs – Ollie Wilson; Wide receivers – Charlie Joiner; Tight ends – Jason Michael; Offensive line – Mike Sullivan; Senior offensive assistant/special assignments – Steve Fairchild; Offensive assistant – Steve Gera	Defensive coaches: Defensive coordinator – John Pagano; Defensive line – Don Johnson; Linebackers – Joe Barry; Assistant linebackers – Greg Williams; Secondary – Ron Meeks; Assistant secondary – Cris Dishman; Defensive assistant – Shane Steichen; Special teams coaches: Assistant head coach/special teams – Rich Bisaccia; Special teams assistant – Carlos Polk; Special teams assistant – Byron Storer; Strength and conditioning: Strength and conditioning – Jeff Hurd; Assistant strength and conditioning – Vernon Stephens

== Final roster ==
2012 San Diego Chargers roster
Quarterbacks (QB): 17 Philip Rivers; 6 Charlie Whitehurst; Running backs (RB): 27 Edwin Baker; 44 Jackie Battle; 36 Curtis Brinkley; 30 Ronnie Brown; 33 Le'Ron McClain FB; Wide receivers (WR): 84 Danario Alexander; 12 Robert Meachem; 11 Eddie Royal PR; 87 Micheal Spurlock; 83 Mike Willie; Tight ends (TE): 85 Antonio Gates; 89 Ladarius Green; 81 Randy McMichael; 88 Dante Rosario	Offensive linemen (OL): 64 Colin Baxter C; 66 Jeromey Clary T; 69 Tyronne Green G; 67 Rex Hadnot G; 61 Nick Hardwick C; 79 Michael Harris T; 70 Kevin Haslam G; 72 Stephen Schilling G; 65 Louis Vasquez G; Defensive linemen (DL): 71 Antonio Garay NT; 94 Corey Liuget DE; 91 Kendall Reyes DE; 79 Damik Scafe DE; 93 Cam Thomas NT	Linebackers (LB): 97 Bront Bird LB; 56 Donald Butler ILB; 52 Larry English OLB; 59 Andrew Gachkar ILB; 53 Gary Guyton ILB; 54 Melvin Ingram OLB; 96 Jarret Johnson OLB; 57 Jonas Mouton ILB; 95 Shaun Phillips OLB; 51 Takeo Spikes ILB; 58 Demorrio Williams ILB; Defensive backs (DB): 22 Chris Carr CB; 20 Antoine Cason CB; 40 Sean Cattouse SS; 40 Gregory Gatson CB; 38 Marcus Gilchrist CB/FS; 23 Quentin Jammer CB; 41 Corey Lynch SS; 32 Eric Weddle FS; 29 Shareece Wright CB; Special teams (ST): 42 Kyle Nelson LS; 9 Nick Novak K; 5 Mike Scifres P	Practice squad: 77 Charlie Bryant NT; 50 Phillip Dillard LB; 76 Logan Harrell DE; 37 Arthur Hobbs CB; 73 Kevin Hughes T; 48 Anthony Miller TE; 82 Kashif Moore WR; Reserve: 13 Seyi Ajirotutu WR (IR); 98 Antwan Barnes OLB (IR); 26 Atari Bigby SS (IR); 86 Vincent Brown WR (IR/DFR); 62 Brandyn Dombrowski T (NF-Inj.); 80 Malcom Floyd WR (IR); 90 Aubrayo Franklin NT (IR); 78 Jared Gaither T (IR); 15 Richard Goodman WR (IR); 92 Vaughn Martin DE (IR); 24 Ryan Mathews RB (IR); 60 David Molk C (IR); 25 Darrell Stuckey FS (IR); 28 Brandon Taylor SS (IR); 63 Johnnie Troutman G (NF-Inj.); 74 Reggie Wells G/T (IR); 47 Mike Windt LS (IR); Rookies in italics 53 active, 17 reserve, 8 practice squad

== Schedule ==
=== Preseason ===
Week	Date	Opponent	Result	Record	Venue	Recap
1	August 9	Green Bay Packers	**W** 21–13	1–0	Qualcomm Stadium	Recap
2	August 18	Dallas Cowboys	**W** 28–20	2–0	Qualcomm Stadium	Recap
3	August 24	at Minnesota Vikings	**W** 12–10	3–0	Mall of America Field	Recap
4	August 30	at San Francisco 49ers	**L** 3–35	3–1	Candlestick Park	Recap

=== Regular season ===
Week	Date	Opponent	Result	Record	Venue	Recap
1	September 10	at **Oakland Raiders**	**W** 22–14	1–0	O.co Coliseum	Recap
2	September 16	Tennessee Titans	**W** 38–10	2–0	Qualcomm Stadium	Recap
3	September 23	Atlanta Falcons	**L** 3–27	2–1	Qualcomm Stadium	Recap
4	September 30	at **Kansas City Chiefs**	**W** 37–20	3–1	Arrowhead Stadium	Recap
5	October 7	at New Orleans Saints	**L** 24–31	3–2	Mercedes-Benz Superdome	Recap
6	October 15	**Denver Broncos**	**L** 24–35	3–3	Qualcomm Stadium	Recap
7	Bye					
8	October 28	at Cleveland Browns	**L** 6–7	3–4	Cleveland Browns Stadium	Recap
9	November 1	**Kansas City Chiefs**	**W** 31–13	4–4	Qualcomm Stadium	Recap
10	November 11	at Tampa Bay Buccaneers	**L** 24–34	4–5	Raymond James Stadium	Recap
11	November 18	at **Denver Broncos**	**L** 23–30	4–6	Sports Authority Field at Mile High	Recap
12	November 25	Baltimore Ravens	**L** 13–16 (OT)	4–7	Qualcomm Stadium	Recap
13	December 2	Cincinnati Bengals	**L** 13–20	4–8	Qualcomm Stadium	Recap
14	December 9	at Pittsburgh Steelers	**W** 34–24	5–8	Heinz Field	Recap
15	December 16	Carolina Panthers	**L** 7–31	5–9	Qualcomm Stadium	Recap
16	December 23	at New York Jets	**W** 27–17	6–9	MetLife Stadium	Recap
17	December 30	**Oakland Raiders**	**W** 24–21	7–9	Qualcomm Stadium	Recap

Note: Intra-division opponents are in bold text.

=== Game summaries ===
==== Week 1: at Oakland Raiders ====
Week One: San Diego Chargers at Oakland Raiders – Game summary

Quarter	1	2	3	4	Total
**Chargers**	3	7	6	6	**22**
Raiders	3	3	0	8	**14**

at O.co Coliseum, Oakland, California

- Date: September 10
- Game time: 7:15 p.m. PDT
- Game weather: 67 °F (19 °C), sunny
- Game attendance: 61,896
- Referee: Jim Core
- TV announcers (ESPN): Chris Berman, Trent Dilfer and Rachel Nichols
- Box score

Game information

**First quarter**

- OAK – Sebastian Janikowski 51-yard field goal, 4:56. Raiders 3–0. **Drive: 7 plays, 33 yards, 2:55.**
- SD – Nate Kaeding 23-yard field goal, 1:00. Tied 3–3. **Drive: 9 plays, 74 yards, 3:56.**

**Second quarter**

- SD – Malcom Floyd 6-yard pass from Philip Rivers (Nate Kaeding kick), 3:10. Chargers 10–3. **Drive: 13 plays, 90 yards, 8:06.**
- OAK – Sebastian Janikowski 19-yard field goal, 0:04. Chargers 10–6. **Drive: 14 plays, 78 yards, 3:06.**

**Third quarter**

- SD – Nate Kaeding 28-yard field goal, 6:01. Chargers 13–6. **Drive: 7 plays, 29 yards, 2:42.**
- SD – Nate Kaeding 19-yard field goal, 1:49. Chargers 16–6. **Drive: 4 plays, 7 yards, 2:31.**

**Fourth quarter**

- SD – Nate Kaeding 41-yard field goal, 12:48. Chargers 19–6. **Drive: 9 plays, 32 yards, 3:02.**
- SD – Nate Kaeding 45-yard field goal, 5:06. Chargers 22–6. **Drive: 8 plays, 15 yards, 4:46.**
- OAK – Rod Streater 2-yard pass from Carson Palmer (Rod Streater pass from Carson Palmer), 0:54. Chargers 22–14. **Drive: 12 plays, 80 yards, 4:12.**

**Top passers**

- SD – Philip Rivers – 24/33, 231 yards, TD
- OAK – Carson Palmer – 32/46, 297 yards, TD

**Top rushers**

- SD – Curtis Brinkley – 10 rushes, 12 yards
  SD – Eddie Royal – 2 rushes, 12 yards
- OAK – Darren McFadden – 15 rushes, 32 yards

**Top receivers**

- SD – Malcom Floyd – 4 receptions, 66 yards, TD
- OAK – Darren McFadden – 13 receptions, 86 yards

The Chargers (1–0) won their season opener 22–14 against the Oakland Raiders after five field goals by Nate Kaeding and three botched punts by the Raiders. The Raiders Pro Bowl long snapper Jon Condo suffered a head injury in the second quarter. He was replaced by linebacker Travis Goethel, who had not snapped since high school. Goethel rolled two snaps to punter Shane Lechler, each giving the Chargers the ball in Raiders territory, and Lechler had another punt blocked by Dante Rosario. The Chargers scored their only touchdown in the second quarter after a 13-play, 90-yard drive resulted in a 6-yard touchdown pass from Philip Rivers to wide receiver Malcom Floyd. The Chargers failed to score four out of five times in the red zone.

San Diego led at halftime 10–6, and the Raiders did not scored a touchdown until 54 seconds remained in the game. Undrafted rookie Mike Harris made his first NFL start, filing in for left tackle for an injured Jared Gaither. San Diego protected Harris by having Rivers throw short passes; sixteen of Rivers' 24 completions were to running backs and tight ends, and he threw for 231 yards while only being sacked once. He did not have an interception after throwing 20 in 2011.

The win was the Chargers' eighth in their previous nine games at Oakland. It improved Norv Turner's record to 4–2 in Chargers' season openers. Running back Ryan Mathews and receiver Vincent Brown missed the game with injuries.

==== Week 2: vs. Tennessee Titans ====
Week Two: Tennessee Titans at San Diego Chargers – Game summary

Quarter	1	2	3	4	Total
Titans	0	3	7	0	**10**
**Chargers**	14	3	7	14	**38**

at Qualcomm Stadium, San Diego, California

- Date: September 16
- Game time: 1:25 pm. PDT
- Game weather: 85 °F (29 °C), sunny
- Game attendance: 60,804
- Referee: Bruce Hermanson
- TV announcers (CBS): Ian Eagle and Dan Fouts
- Box score

Game information

**First quarter**

- SD – Dante Rosario 11-yard pass from Philip Rivers (Nate Kaeding kick), 8:52. Chargers 7–0. **Drive: 12 plays, 71 yards, 6:08.**
- SD – Dante Rosario 4-yard pass from Philip Rivers (Nate Kaeding kick), 4:15. Chargers 14–0. **Drive: 6 plays, 31 yards, 3:43.**

**Second quarter**

- SD – Nate Kaeding 26-yard field goal, 12:15. Chargers 17–0. **Drive: 9 plays, 50 yards, 5:24.**
- TEN – Rob Bironas 23-yard field goal, 4:42. Chargers 17–3. **Drive: 10 plays, 81 yards, 3:21.**

**Third quarter**

- SD – Dante Rosario 15-yard pass from Philip Rivers (Nate Kaeding kick), 3:29. Chargers 24–3. **Drive: 8 plays, 88 yards, 5:17.**
- TEN – Kendall Wright 15-yard pass from Jake Locker (Rob Bironas kick), 2:20. Chargers 24–10. **Drive: 3 plays, 32 yards, 1:09.**

**Fourth quarter**

- SD – Jackie Battle 1-yard run (Nate Kaeding kick), 10:33. Chargers 31–10. **Drive: 11 plays, 80 yards, 6:47.**
- SD – Jackie Battle 1-yard run (Nate Kaeding kick), 1:13. Chargers 38–10. **Drive: 13 plays, 69 yards, 8:29.**

**Top passers**

- TEN – Jake Locker – 15/30, 174 yards, TD, INT
- SD – Philip Rivers – 24/32, 284 yards, 3 TDs, INT

**Top rushers**

- TEN – Jake Locker – 2 rushes, 21 yards
- SD – Jackie Battle – 14 rushes, 69 yards, 2 TDs

**Top receivers**

- TEN – Craig Stevens – 1 reception, 46 yards
- SD – Malcolm Floyd – 6 receptions, 109 yards

With the win, the Chargers improved to 2–0 and started with such a record for the first time since 2006.

==== Week 3: vs. Atlanta Falcons ====
Week Three: Atlanta Falcons at San Diego Chargers – Game summary

Quarter	1	2	3	4	Total
**Falcons**	6	14	0	7	**27**
Chargers	0	0	3	0	**3**

at Qualcomm Stadium, San Diego, California

- Date: September 23
- Game time: 1:05 pm. PDT
- Game weather: 82 °F (28 °C), sunny
- Game attendance: 61,297
- Referee: Jim Core
- TV announcers (Fox): Chris Myers, Tim Ryan and Jaime Maggio (blacked out locally)
- Box score

Game information

**First quarter**

- ATL – Jacquizz Rodgers 8-yard pass from Matt Ryan (run failed), 9:43. Falcons 6–0. **Drive: 10 plays, 80 yards, 5:17.**

**Second quarter**

- ATL – Tony Gonzalez 7-yard pass from Matt Ryan (Matt Bryant kick), 2:32. Falcons 13–0. **Drive: 17 plays, 96 yards, 7:59.**
- ATL – Julio Jones 9-yard pass from Matt Ryan (Matt Bryant kick), 0:54. Falcons 20–0. **Drive: 4 plays, 29 yards, 0:59.**

**Third quarter**

- SD – Nate Kaeding 41-yard field goal, 11:10. Falcons 20–3. **Drive: 13 plays, 41 yards, 3:50.**

**Fourth quarter**

- ATL – Michael Turner 7-yard run (Matt Bryant kick), 8:51. Falcons 27–3. **Drive: 3 plays, 32 yards, 1:35.**

**Top passers**

- ATL – Matt Ryan – 30/40, 275 yards, 3 TD, INT
- SD – Philip Rivers – 21/38, 173 yards, 2 INT

**Top rushers**

- ATL – Michael Turner – 14 rushes, 80 yards, TD
- SD – Jackie Battle – 3 rushes, 55 yards

**Top receivers**

- ATL – Tony Gonzalez – 9 receptions, 91 yards, TD
- SD – Malcom Floyd – 3 receptions, 52 yards

The Chargers lost 27–3 to the Atlanta Falcons, who remained one of three undefeated teams in the league. Rivers had one of his worst statistical performances, completing 21 of 38 passes for 173 yards, with two interceptions and a passer rating of 45.2. Running back Ryan Matthews made his season debut, and ran for 44 yards on 10 carries. However, he had a fumble inside the Falcons' 5-yard line. The Chargers had four turnovers to the Atlanta's one. The Chargers had not been held to three points since a 30–3 loss at Miami during the 2002 season. The Falcons improved to a perfect 3–0 all-time record in San Diego while the Chargers dropped to 2–1 on the season while suffering a television blackout in Southern California. As of 2024, this is the Chargers last loss to Atlanta.

==== Week 4: at Kansas City Chiefs ====
Week Four: San Diego Chargers at Kansas City Chiefs – Game summary

Quarter	1	2	3	4	Total
**Chargers**	17	10	0	10	**37**
Chiefs	0	6	7	7	**20**

at Arrowhead Stadium, Kansas City, Missouri

- Date: September 30
- Game time: 12:00 p.m. CDT/10:00 am. PDT
- Game weather: 67 °F (19 °C), cloudy
- Game attendance: 69,979
- Referee: Bill Leavy
- TV announcers (CBS): Kevin Harlan and Solomon Wilcots
- Box score

Game information

**First quarter**

- SD – Eddie Royal 4-yard pass from Philip Rivers (Nick Novak kick), 10:04. Chargers 7–0. **Drive: 9 plays, 76 yards, 4:56.**
- SD – Nick Novak 24-yard field goal, 6:26. Chargers 10–0. **Drive: 5 plays, 22 yards, 2:13.**
- SD – Jackie Battle 1 yard run (Nick Novak kick), 5:28. Chargers 17–0. **Drive: 2 plays, 5 yards, 0:44.**

**Second quarter**

- SD – Nick Novak 47-yard field goal, 8:09. Chargers 20–0. **Drive: 6 plays, 42 yards, 3:47.**
- KC – Jamaal Charles 37-yard run (pass failed), 5:09. Chargers 20–6. **Drive: 5 plays, 85 yards, 2:19.**
- SD – Donald Butler 21-yard interception return (Nick Novak kick), 2:51. Chargers 27–6.

**Third quarter**

- KC – Jamaal Charles 13-yard pass from Matt Cassel (Ryan Succop kick), 8:40. Chargers 27–13. **Drive: 13 plays, 80 yards, 6:20.**

**Fourth quarter**

- SD – Jackie Battle 4-yard pass from Philip Rivers (Nick Novak kick), 7:59. Chargers 34–13. **Drive: 9 plays, 49 yards, 5:31.**
- KC – Dwayne Bowe 29-yard pass from Matt Cassel (Ryan Succop kick), 5:29. Chargers 34–20. **Drive: 7 plays, 71 yards, 2:25.**
- SD – Nick Novak 45-yard field goal, 1:56. Chargers 37–20. **Drive: 9 plays, 53 yards, 3:33.**

**Top passers**

- SD – Philip Rivers – 18/23, 209 yards, 2 TD, INT
- KC – Matt Cassel – 24/42, 251 yards, 2 TD, 3 INT

**Top rushers**

- SD – Ryan Mathews – 14 rushes, 61 yards
- KC – Jamaal Charles – 17 rushes, 88 yards, TD

**Top receivers**

- SD – Antonio Gates – 3 receptions, 59 yards
- KC – Dwayne Bowe – 7 receptions, 108 yards, TD

The Chargers defeated the Kansas City Chiefs 37–20 and started the season with a 3–1 record for the second consecutive year. San Diego forced the Chiefs into six turnovers, and they led 20–0 in the second quarter. Rivers completed 18 of 23 passes for 209 yards and two touchdown passes, but threw one interception in the red zone. Jackie Battle started at running back instead of Mathews. Battle was in 27 plays compared to Mathews' 21, and he had 15 carries for 39 yards with a team-high four catches for 42 yards. Most of Mathews work was in the fourth quarter when San Diego's victory was mostly already decided. U-T San Diego wrote that Mathews would have been expected to start were it not for his fumble against Atlanta the prior week. Nick Novak filled in for kicker Nate Kaeding, who was out with a groin injury, and made all three of his field goals.

==== Week 5: at New Orleans Saints ====
Week Five: San Diego Chargers at New Orleans Saints – Game summary

Quarter	1	2	3	4	Total
Chargers	7	10	7	0	**24**
**Saints**	7	7	7	10	**31**

at Mercedes-Benz Superdome, New Orleans, Louisiana

- Date: October 7
- Game time: 7:20 pm. CDT/5:20 pm. PDT
- Game weather: Played indoors (dome stadium)
- Game attendance: 73,109
- Referee: Carl Cheffers
- TV announcers (NBC): Al Michaels, Cris Collinsworth and Michele Tafoya
- Box score

Game information

**First quarter**

- SD – Robert Meachem 15-yard pass from Philip Rivers (Nick Novak kick), 7:02. Chargers 7–0. **Drive: 7 plays, 91 yards, 3:26.**
- NO – Devery Henderson 40-yard pass from Drew Brees (Garrett Hartley kick), 3:05. Tied 7–7. **Drive: 9 plays, 80 yards, 3:58.**

**Second quarter**

- SD – Nick Novak 20-yard field goal, 10:01. Chargers 10–7. **Drive: 8 plays, 63 yards, 4:08.**
- NO – Marques Colston 19-yard pass from Drew Brees (Garrett Hartley kick), 7:25. Saints 14–10. **Drive: 7 plays, 80 yards, 2:39.**
- SD – Robert Meachem 44-yard pass from Philip Rivers (Nick Novak kick), 0:44. Chargers 17–14. **Drive: 4 plays, 86 yards, 1:12.**

**Third quarter**

- SD – Ryan Mathews 13-yard run (Nick Novak kick), 12:34. Chargers 24–14. **Drive: 3 plays, 25 yards, 1:19.**
- NO – Marques Colston 16-yard pass from Drew Brees (Garrett Hartley kick), 0:16. Chargers 24–21. **Drive: 9 plays, 87 yards, 4:28.**

**Fourth quarter**

- NO – Marques Colston 5-yard pass from Drew Brees (Garrett Hartley kick), 8:55. Saints 28–24. **Drive: 9 plays, 90 yards, 5:49.**
- NO – Garrett Hartley 26-yard field goal, 3:00. Saints 31–24. **Drive: 7 plays, 16 yards, 2:49.**

**Top passers**

- SD – Philip Rivers – 27/42, 354 yards, 2 TD, INT
- NO – Drew Brees – 29/45, 370 yards, 4 TD, INT

**Top rushers**

- SD – Ryan Mathews – 12 rushes, 80 yards, TD
- NO – Pierre Thomas – 9 rushes, 30 yards

**Top receivers**

- SD – Malcolm Floyd – 5 receptions, 108 yards
- NO – Marques Colston – 9 receptions, 131 yards, 3 TD

San Diego led 24–14 in the third quarter before the New Orleans Saints rallied for a 31–24 victory. The Chargers' Melvin Ingram was called for roughing the passer, nullifying a Drew Brees interception returned for a touchdown that would have put the Chargers ahead 31–14. Rivers had two costly turnovers in the fourth quarter: an interception that led to a Saints field goal and a fumble as San Diego was driving to tie the score in the game's last minute.

With the loss, San Diego missed an opportunity to take a two-game lead over the Denver Broncos for the AFC West. The Chargers dropped to 3–2 while the Saints would get their first win of the season and improve to 1–4.

Brees, a former Charger, broke an NFL record with his 48th straight game with a touchdown pass. During the celebration, a visibly frustrated Philip Rivers (Brees's former teammate) was shown on the sidelines. Brees finished with 370 yards and four touchdown passes. Rivers threw for 354 yards and two touchdowns, both to former Saint Robert Meachem; they were Meachem's first touchdowns of the season.

==== Week 6: vs. Denver Broncos ====
Week Six: Denver Broncos at San Diego Chargers – Game summary

Quarter	1	2	3	4	Total
**Broncos**	0	0	14	21	**35**
Chargers	10	14	0	0	**24**

at Qualcomm Stadium, San Diego, California

- Date: October 15
- Game time: 5:30 pm. PDT
- Game weather: 78 °F (26 °C), sunny
- Game attendance: 68,604
- Referee: Jeff Triplette
- TV announcers (ESPN): Mike Tirico, Jon Gruden and Lisa Salters
- Box score

Game information

**First quarter**

- SD – Nick Novak 32-yard field goal, 8:59. Chargers 3–0. **Drive: 4 plays, 4 yards, 0:56.**
- SD – Antonio Gates 15-yard pass from Philip Rivers (Nick Novak kick), 8:16. Chargers 10–0. **Drive: 2 plays, 19 yards, 0:40.**

**Second quarter**

- SD – Quentin Jammer 80-yard interception return (Nick Novak kick), 6:00. Chargers 17–0.
- SD – Antonio Gates 11-yard pass from Philip Rivers (Nick Novak kick), 0:24. Chargers 24–0. **Drive: 10 plays, 66 yards, 3:56.**

**Third quarter**

- DEN – Demaryius Thomas 29-yard pass from Peyton Manning (Matt Prater kick), 10:56. Chargers 24–7. **Drive: 8 plays, 85 yards, 4:04.**
- DEN – Tony Carter 65-yard fumble return (Matt Prater kick), 4:41. Chargers 24–14.

**Fourth quarter**

- DEN – Eric Decker 7-yard pass from Peyton Manning (Matt Prater kick), 13:33. Chargers 24–21. **Drive: 9 plays, 55 yards, 4:14.**
- DEN – Brandon Stokley 21-yard pass from Peyton Manning (Matt Prater kick), 9:03. Broncos 28–24. **Drive: 4 plays, 50 yards, 2:08.**
- DEN – Chris Harris, Jr. 46-yard interception return (Matt Prater kick), 2:05. Broncos 35–24.

**Top passers**

- DEN – Peyton Manning – 24/30, 309 yards, 3 TD, INT
- SD – Philip Rivers – 25/41, 241 yards, 2 TD, 4 INT

**Top rushers**

- DEN – Willis McGahee – 17 rushes, 56 yards
- SD – Ryan Mathews – 22 rushes, 74 yards

**Top receivers**

- DEN – Eric Decker – 6 receptions, 98 yards, TD
- SD – Antonio Gates – 6 receptions, 81 yards, 2 TD

The Chargers lost 35–24 to the Denver Broncos after leading 24–0 at halftime. The loss tied San Diego with Denver for the AFC West lead with a 3–3 record. Rivers had a career-high six turnovers, five in the second half. One of his interceptions and one of his fumbles were returned by the Broncos for touchdowns. He had four interceptions, including three in the fourth quarter.

The Chargers built their first-half lead after two special teams fumble recoveries and an 80-yard touchdown return by Quentin Jammer off a Peyton Manning interception. It was the first score of Jammer's career. Rivers also threw two touchdowns to Antonio Gates in the first half.

After the game, Fox Sports insider Jay Glazer reported that the Chargers used an "illegal stickum-type substance" during the game, and a Chargers equipment member was caught by the line judge hiding and handing out the substance to players, which was confiscated by the league. Chargers head coach Norv Turner denied that the team cheated, and stated that the object was a towel with a substance that dries footballs. The product was later identified as Gorilla Gold Grip Enhancer. On November 7, the league stated that the Chargers did not cheat, but fined the team $20,000.

==== Week 8: at Cleveland Browns ====
Week Eight: San Diego Chargers at Cleveland Browns – Game summary

Quarter	1	2	3	4	Total
Chargers	0	3	3	0	**6**
**Browns**	7	0	0	0	**7**

at Cleveland Browns Stadium, Cleveland, Ohio

- Date: October 28
- Game time: 1:00 p.m. EDT/10:00 am. PDT
- Game weather: 44 °F (7 °C), cloudy and overcast
- Game attendance: 65,337
- Referee: Jerome Boger
- TV announcers (CBS): Spero Dedes and Rich Gannon
- Box score

Game information

**First quarter**

- CLE – Trent Richardson 26-yard run (Phil Dawson kick), 4:26. Browns 7–0. **Drive: 12 plays, 70 yards, 4:35.**

**Second quarter**

- SD – Nick Novak 43-yard field goal, 0:03. Browns 7–3. **Drive: 10 plays, 55 yards, 1:48.**

**Third quarter**

- SD – Nick Novak 31-yard field goal, 2:36. Browns 7–6. **Drive: 9 plays, 30 yards, 4:36.**

**Fourth quarter**

- No scoring plays.

**Top passers**

- SD – Philip Rivers – 18/34, 154 yards
- CLE – Brandon Weeden – 11/27, 129 yards

**Top rushers**

- SD – Ryan Mathews – 24 rushes, 95 yards
- CLE – Trent Richardson – 24 rushes, 122 yards, TD

**Top receivers**

- SD – Ronnie Brown – 7 receptions, 85 yards
- CLE – Josh Gordon – 3 receptions, 46 yards

San Diego (3–4) lost their third straight game, 7–6 on the road to the Cleveland Browns (2–6). After blowing second-half leads the past two games in consecutive losses, the Chargers never led in this game. Both offenses struggled with wind blowing to more than 40 mph (64 km/h) and rain falling throughout the entire game. Rivers was 18 of 34 for 154 yards, but had a touchdown pass dropped by Meachem in the third quarter. With the Chargers forced to run because of the bad weather, Mathews ran 24 times for 95 yards. The Browns' Trent Richardson ran for 122 yards and a touchdown. It was the second game of the year the Chargers did not score an offensive touchdown. The last time San Diego failed to score a touchdown in two or more games was in 2000, when it occurred three times.

With the Broncos' win that same week, the Chargers fell into a second place tie with the Raiders in the AFC West.

==== Week 9: vs. Kansas City Chiefs ====
Week Nine: Kansas City Chiefs at San Diego Chargers – Game summary

Quarter	1	2	3	4	Total
Chiefs	0	3	3	7	**13**
**Chargers**	7	3	0	21	**31**

at Qualcomm Stadium, San Diego, California

- Date: November 1
- Game time: 5:20 pm. PDT
- Game weather: 63 °F (17 °C), sunny
- Game attendance: 55,831
- Referee: Alberto Riveron
- TV announcers (NFLN): Brad Nessler, Mike Mayock and Alex Flanagan
- Box score

Game information

**First quarter**

- SD – Antonio Gates 14-yard pass from Philip Rivers (Nick Novak kick), 10:24. Chargers 7–0. **Drive: 7 plays, 80 yards, 4:36.**

**Second quarter**

- SD – Nick Novak 25-yard field goal, 9:10. Chargers 10–0. **Drive: 12 plays, 71 yards, 8:08.**
- KC – Ryan Succop 49-yard field goal, 2:51. Chargers 10–3. **Drive: 10 plays, 49 yards, 6:19.**

**Third quarter**

- KC – Ryan Succop 41-yard field goal, 0:53. Chargers 10–6. **Drive: 10 plays, 70 yards, 6:16.**

**Fourth quarter**

- SD – Malcom Floyd 13-yard pass from Philip Rivers (Nick Novak kick), 11:33. Chargers 17–6. **Drive: 8 plays, 80 yards, 4:20.**
- SD – Shaun Phillips fumble recovery in end zone (Nick Novak kick), 10:39. Chargers 24–6.
- SD – Demorrio Williams 59-yard interception return (Nick Novak kick), 8:33. Chargers 31–6.
- KC – Shaun Draughn 6-yard run (Ryan Succop kick), 4:26. Chargers 31–13. **Drive: 10 plays, 80 yards, 4:07.**

**Top passers**

- KC – Matt Cassel – 19/29, 181 yards, INT
- SD – Philip Rivers – 18/20, 220 yards, 2 TD, INT

**Top rushers**

- KC – Jamaal Charles – 12 rushes, 39 yards
- SD – Ryan Mathews – 13 rushes, 67 yards

**Top receivers**

- KC – Dwayne Bowe – 8 receptions, 79 yards
- SD – Danario Alexander – 3 receptions, 61 yards

The Chargers (4–4) won 31–13 in a home game against Kansas City (1–7), their second win in the season against the Chiefs. San Diego's defense scored two touchdowns, and Rivers completed 90% (18–20) of his passes, the fifth highest completion percentage in NFL history. Rivers threw a touchdown to Gates in the opening drive of the game, and threw another to Floyd in the fourth quarter. The defense followed with Jarret Johnson's sack of the Chiefs' Matt Cassel, which caused a fumble that was recovered by Shaun Phillips for a San Diego touchdown. On the next drive, Demorrio Williams intercepted Cassel's pass and returned it for a 59-yard touchdown.

Rivers threw for 220 yards, but had an interception in the red zone to end the first half. Danario Alexander started at wide receiver for an injured Meachem, and receiver Eddie Royal also sat out the game. Nose tackle Antonio Garay played his first game of the year. Some fans at halftime held a sign that read "Mr. Spanos, please fire A.J. & Norv." Team president Dean Spanos in January had decided to bring back coach Norv Turner and general manager A. J. Smith despite having won only three playoff games in five seasons (first year 2007), failing to qualify in the previous two season. Norv had a 3–3 playoff record with the Chargers between 2007 and 2009, the only years the Chargers made the playoffs during Norvs tenure.

==== Week 10: at Tampa Bay Buccaneers ====
Week Ten: San Diego Chargers at Tampa Bay Buccaneers – Game summary

Quarter	1	2	3	4	Total
Chargers	14	7	0	3	**24**
**Buccaneers**	7	10	7	10	**34**

at Raymond James Stadium, Tampa, Florida

- Date: November 11
- Game time: 1:00 pm. EST/10:00 am. PST
- Game weather: 80 °F (27 °C), cloudy
- Game attendance: 54,813
- Referee: Bill Vinovich
- TV announcers (CBS): Kevin Harlan and Solomon Wilcots
- Box score

Game information

**First quarter**

- SD – Danario Alexander 80-yard pass from Philip Rivers (Nick Novak kick), 13:57. Chargers 7–0. **Drive: 3 plays, 80 yards, 1:03.**
- TB – Dallas Clark 3-yard pass from Josh Freeman (Connor Barth kick), 8:57. Tied 7–7. **Drive: 9 plays, 80 yards, 5:00.**
- SD – Antonio Gates 13-yard pass from Philip Rivers (Nick Novak kick), 4:19. Chargers 14–7. **Drive: 7 plays, 80 yards, 4:38.**

**Second quarter**

- TB – Connor Barth 40-yard field goal, 12:52. Chargers 14–10. **Drive: 7 plays, 58 yards, 3:09.**
- TB – Adam Hayward 29-yard blocked punt return (Connor Barth kick), 8:55. Buccaneers 17–14.
- SD – Malcom Floyd 3-yard pass from Philip Rivers (Nick Novak kick), 0:27. Chargers 21–17. **Drive: 14 plays, 80 yards, 8:28.**

**Third quarter**

- TB – Tiquan Underwood 15-yard pass from Josh Freeman (Connor Barth kick), 4:07. Buccaneers 24–21. **Drive: 6 plays, 59 yards, 3:32.**

**Fourth quarter**

- TB – Leonard Johnson 83-yard interception return (Connor Barth kick), 13:22. Buccaneers 31–21.
- SD – Nick Novak 34-yard field goal, 7:02. Buccaneers 31–24. **Drive: 11 plays, 64 yards, 6:20.**
- TB – Connor Barth 45-yard field goal, 1:07. Buccaneers 34–24. **Drive: 6 plays, 18 yards, 2:02.**

**Top passers**

- SD – Philip Rivers – 29/37, 337 yards, 3 TD, 2 INT
- TB – Josh Freeman – 14/20, 210 yards, 2 TD

**Top rushers**

- SD – Ryan Mathews – 17 rushes, 54 yards
- TB – Doug Martin – 19 rushes, 68 yards

**Top receivers**

- SD – Danario Alexander – 5 receptions, 134 yards, TD
- TB – Mike Williams – 2 receptions, 64 yards

San Diego (4–5) lost 34–24 to the Tampa Bay Buccaneers (5–4), dropping the Chargers two games behind division-leading Denver. The Chargers allowed touchdowns off a blocked punt and an interception after they led 21–17 at halftime. They had three touchdowns off 80-yard drives in the first half, when Rivers threw three touchdown while completing 16 of 18 passes for 218 yards and no interceptions. However, he three two interceptions in the fourth quarter, including one that was returned 83 yards for a touchdown that he threw heading out of bounds to avoid a sack.

Alexander had five receptions for 134 yards, including an 80-yard touchdown. Vincent Jackson, who left the Chargers as a free agent for Tampa Bay, had five receptions for 59 yards in his first game against San Diego.

==== Week 11: at Denver Broncos ====
Week Eleven: San Diego Chargers at Denver Broncos – Game summary

Quarter	1	2	3	4	Total
Chargers	7	0	9	7	**23**
**Broncos**	0	17	7	6	**30**

at Sports Authority Field at Mile High, Denver, Colorado

- Date: November 18
- Game time: 2:25 p.m. MST/1:25 pm. PST
- Game weather: 62 °F (17 °C), sunny
- Game attendance: 76,769
- Referee: Carl Cheffers
- TV announcers (CBS): Kevin Harlan and Solomon Wilcots
- Box score

Game information

**First quarter**

- SD – Eric Weddle 23-yard interception return (Nick Novak kick), 6:52. Chargers 7–0.

**Second quarter**

- DEN – Demaryius Thomas 13-yard pass from Peyton Manning (Matt Prater kick), 13:00. Tied 7–7. **Drive: 6 plays, 56 yards, 2:20.**
- DEN – Matt Prater 19-yard field goal, 11:33. Broncos 10–7. **Drive: 4 plays, 7 yards, 1:14.**
- DEN – Brandon Stokley 31-yard pass from Peyton Manning (Matt Prater kick), 1:44. Broncos 17–7. **Drive: 1 play, 31 yards, 0:07.**

**Third quarter**

- SD – Safety, Peyton Manning sacked by Shaun Phillips in the end zone, 12:48. Broncos 17–9.
- DEN – Eric Decker 20-yard pass from Peyton Manning, Matt Prater kick, 7:23. Broncos 24–9. **Drive: 3 plays, 25 yards, 0:18.**
- SD – Danario Alexander 8-yard pass from Philip Rivers Nick Novak kick, 0:58. Broncos 24–16. **Drive: 12 plays, 80 yards, 6:25.**

**Fourth quarter**

- DEN – Matt Prater 30-yard field goal, 10:43. Broncos 27–16. **Drive: 10 plays, 67 yards, 5:15.**
- DEN – Matt Prater 32-yard field goal, 4:14. Broncos 30–16. **Drive: 11 plays, 57 yards, 4:56.**
- SD – Danario Alexander 21-yard pass from Philip Rivers (Nick Novak kick), 1:24. Broncos 30–23. **Drive: 8 plays, 80 yards, 2:50.**

**Top passers**

- SD – Philip Rivers – 24/40, 258 yards, 2 TD, 2 INT
- DEN – Peyton Manning – 25/42, 270 yards, 3 TD, INT

**Top rushers**

- SD – Ryan Mathews – 15 rushes, 47 yards
- DEN – Willis McGahee – 7 rushes, 55 yards

**Top receivers**

- SD – Danario Alexander – 7 receptions, 96 yards, 2 TD
- DEN – Brandon Stokley – 4 receptions, 55 yards, TD

The Chargers (4–6) fell three games behind Denver (7–3) for the division lead after losing to them, 30–23. Denver linebacker Von Miller had three sacks and forced two fumbles as the defense rattled Rivers. "This is the best defensive team they've had since I've been playing them," said Rivers.

The Chargers offense was shut out in the first half. Their first 12 possessions resulted in 10 punts and two turnovers. Rivers was 9-for-20 for 60 yards and an interception, and the running game had only 8 yards on 11 attempts. The Chargers first 9 points of the game were scored by the defense—an interception returned for a touchdown by Eric Weddle, and a safety by Shaun Phillips. Rivers threw for 198 of his 258 yards in the second half while throwing two touchdowns. Manning finished the game with 270 yards and three touchdown for Denver.

Denver swept the season series against the Chargers, giving them the advantage in a tiebreaker with San Diego if needed. "They're not losing four of six, I can guarantee you that", Rivers said in conceding the division. He was part of the 2008 team that trailed Denver by three games with three remaining before winning the division as the Broncos collapsed.

==== Week 12: vs. Baltimore Ravens ====
Week Twelve: Baltimore Ravens at San Diego Chargers – Game summary

Quarter	1	2	3	4	OT	Total
**Ravens**	0	0	3	10	3	**16**
Chargers	0	10	0	3	0	**13**

at Qualcomm Stadium, San Diego, California

- Date: November 25
- Game time: 1:05 pm. PST
- Game weather: 59 °F (15 °C), partly cloudy
- Game attendance: 57,882
- Referee: Gene Steratore
- TV announcers (CBS): Ian Eagle and Dan Fouts (blacked out locally)
- Box score

Game information

**First quarter**

- No scoring plays.

**Second quarter**

- SD – Malcom Floyd 21-yard pass from Philip Rivers (Nick Novak kick), 9:48. Chargers 7–0. **Drive: 9 plays, 78 yards, 4:02.**
- SD – Nick Novak 47-yard field goal, 3:08. Chargers 10–0. **Drive: 11 plays, 53 yards, 4:52.**

**Third quarter**

- BAL – Justin Tucker 43-yard field goal, 12:23. Chargers 10–3. **Drive: 7 plays, 59 yards, 2:41.**

**Fourth quarter**

- SD – Nick Novak 30-yard field goal, 7:55. Chargers 13–3. **Drive: 13 plays, 72 yards, 7:39.**
- BAL – Dennis Pitta 4-yard pass from Joe Flacco (Justin Tucker kick), 4:23. Chargers 13–10. **Drive: 9 plays, 80 yards, 3:32.**
- BAL – Justin Tucker 38-yard field goal, 0:03. Tied 13–13. **Drive: 12 plays, 40 yards, 3:09.**

**Overtime**

- BAL – Justin Tucker 38-yard field goal, 1:12. Ravens 16–13. **Drive: 12 plays, 69 yards, 3:49.**

**Top passers**

- BAL – Joe Flacco – 30/51, 355 yards, TD
- SD – Philip Rivers – 23/36, 228 yards, TD

**Top rushers**

- BAL – Ray Rice – 22 rushes, 97 yards
- SD – Ryan Mathews – 19 rushes, 72 yards

**Top receivers**

- BAL – Torrey Smith – 7 receptions, 144 yards
- SD – Danario Alexander – 5 receptions, 74 yards

San Diego (4–7) led 13–3 with 7:51 remaining in the game before losing 16–13 in overtime to the Baltimore Ravens (9–2). The Ravens faced fourth-and-29 at their own 37 with 1:37 left when running back Ray Rice caught a pass one yard past the line of scrimmage. He ran to the 50-yard line, where he made three Chargers miss with a 90-degree cut to his left. Rice gained the 29 yards needed for a first down after escaping safety Eric Weddle, who received a concussion on the play as he was blocked by wide receiver Anquan Boldin. The Ravens kicked a 38-yard field goal to tie the game at the end of regulation, and made another 38-yarder to win with 1:07 left in overtime.

Rivers threw a 21-yard touchdown to Floyd and Novak kicked two field goals for the Chargers' scores. Rivers was sacked six times, but did not have a turnover for only the third time in 11 games; he entered the contest with 14 interceptions and four lost fumbles. The Ravens' fourth-and-29 was the longest fourth-down conversion in the NFL since 2001. It was the third time the Chargers blew a double-digit lead in the second half, including the earlier back-to-back losses to the Saints and Broncos. After being 8–0 under Turner in November from 2009 to 2010, San Diego fell to 1–7, the second-worst November record in the league since 2011.

==== Week 13: vs. Cincinnati Bengals ====
Week Thirteen: Cincinnati Bengals at San Diego Chargers – Game summary

Quarter	1	2	3	4	Total
**Bengals**	7	3	0	10	**20**
Chargers	0	13	0	0	**13**

at Qualcomm Stadium, San Diego, California

- Date: December 2
- Game time: 1:25 pm. PST
- Game weather: 66 °F (19 °C), cloudy
- Game attendance: 54,980
- Referee: Walt Coleman
- TV announcers (CBS): Marv Albert and Rich Gannon (blacked out locally)
- Box score

Game information

**First quarter**

- CIN – Jermaine Gresham 19-yard pass from Andy Dalton (Mike Nugent kick), 7:39. Bengals 7–0. **Drive: 16 plays, 91 yards, 7:21.**

**Second quarter**

- SD – Nick Novak 20-yard field goal, 14:57. Bengals 7–3. **Drive: 13 plays, 79 yards, 7:42.**
- SD – Demorrio Williams 31-yard interception return (Nick Novak kick), 14:09. Chargers 10–7.
- CIN – Mike Nugent 19-yard field goal, 9:38. Tied 10–10. **Drive: 10 plays, 82 yards, 4:31.**
- SD – Nick Novak 19-yard field goal, 0:00. Chargers 13–10. **Drive: 11 plays, 85 yards, 1:45.**

**Third quarter**

- No scoring plays.

**Fourth quarter**

- CIN – Andy Dalton 6-yard run (Mike Nugent kick), 4:11. Bengals 17–13. **Drive: 14 plays, 55 yards, 7:42.**
- CIN – Mike Nugent 24-yard field goal, 2:47. Bengals 20–13. **Drive: 4 plays, 7 yards, 1:07.**

**Top passers**

- CIN – Andy Dalton – 25/38, 211 yards, TD, 2 INT
- SD – Philip Rivers – 26/48, 280 yards, INT

**Top rushers**

- CIN – BenJarvus Green-Ellis – 25 rushes, 118 yards
- SD – Ryan Mathews – 9 rushes, 26 yards

**Top receivers**

- CIN – A. J. Green – 9 receptions, 85 yards
- SD – Danario Alexander – 6 receptions, 102 yards

The Cincinnati Bengals (7–5) scored the go-ahead touchdown with 4:51 remaining in the game and defeated the Chargers (4–8), 20–13. San Diego surrendered 10 points in the final five minutes of regulation for the second consecutive week, and they lost for the fourth straight week and seventh time in eight games. The Chargers dropped to 0–5 in games decided by seven points or fewer. It was their fourth loss in a game when holding a fourth-quarter lead.

Williams intercepted Bengals quarterback Andy Dalton and returned it for a 31-yard touchdown, his second score of the season. Rivers had two turnovers in the final 3:54. A fumble set up a field goal for the Bengals, and he threw an interception on fourth-and-10 from Cincinnati's 17 with 49 seconds remaining. The Chargers' offense was held without a touchdown for the third time in the season.

The Chargers' home crowd of 54,980 was their lowest since 2004. It was their second straight blackout and third of the season. Meachem did not have a pass thrown to him for the second straight week; it was his fifth game without a catch.

==== Week 14: at Pittsburgh Steelers ====
Week Fourteen: San Diego Chargers at Pittsburgh Steelers – Game summary

Quarter	1	2	3	4	Total
**Chargers**	3	10	14	7	**34**
Steelers	0	3	7	14	**24**

at Heinz Field, Pittsburgh, Pennsylvania

- Date: December 9
- Game time: 1:00 pm. EST/10:00 am. PST
- Game weather: 45 °F (7 °C), cloudy
- Referee: Scott Green
- TV announcers (CBS): Jim Nantz and Phil Simms
- Box score

Game information

**First quarter**

- SD – Nick Novak 51-yard field goal, 3:06. Chargers 3–0. **Drive: 12 plays, 36 yards, 6:09.**

**Second quarter**

- SD – Danario Alexander 39-yard pass from Philip Rivers (Nick Novak kick), 3:40. Chargers 10–0. **Drive: 3 plays, 48 yards, 1:38.**
- SD – Nick Novak 39-yard field goal, 0:50. Chargers 13–0. **Drive: 8 plays, 26 yards, 1:08.**
- PIT – Shaun Suisham 49-yard field goal, 0:00. Chargers 13–3. **Drive: 7 plays, 59 yards, 0:50.**

**Third quarter**

- SD – Malcolm Floyd 3-yard pass from Philip Rivers (Nick Novak kick), 5:28. Chargers 20–3. **Drive: 17 plays, 78 yards, 9:32.**
- SD – Quentin Jammer fumble recovery in end zone (Nick Novak kick), 5:16. Chargers 27–3.
- PIT – Mike Wallace 40-yard pass from Ben Roethlisberger (Shaun Suisham kick), 2:33. Chargers 27–10. **Drive: 7 plays, 80 yards, 2:43.**

**Fourth quarter**

- SD – Danario Alexander 15-yard pass from Philip Rivers (Nick Novak kick), 9:46. Chargers 34–10. **Drive: 2 plays, 17 yards, 0:39.**
- PIT – Mike Wallace 11-yard pass from Ben Roethlisberger (Shaun Suisham kick), 6:07. Chargers 34–17. **Drive: 10 plays, 81 yards, 3:39.**
- PIT – Antonio Brown 1-yard pass from Ben Roethlisberger (Shaun Suisham kick), 0:58. Chargers 34–24. **Drive: 6 plays, 44 yards, 1:35.**

**Top passers**

- SD – Philip Rivers – 21/41, 200 yards, 3 TD
- PIT – Ben Roethlisberger – 22/42, 285 yards, 3 TD, INT

**Top rushers**

- SD – Ryan Matthews – 25 rushes, 65 yards
- PIT – Jonathan Dwyer – 8 rushes, 32 yards

**Top receivers**

- SD – Danario Alexander – 7 receptions, 88 yards, 2 TD
- PIT – Mike Wallace – 7 receptions, 112 yards, 2 TD

With a surprising road victory over the Steelers to save their playoff hopes after losing four straight games, the Chargers improved to 5–8 on the season and 1–14 all-time in Pittsburgh during the regular season. The Steelers became the only AFC North team that San Diego would defeat this season.

==== Week 15: vs. Carolina Panthers ====
Week Fifteen: Carolina Panthers at San Diego Chargers – Game summary

Quarter	1	2	3	4	Total
**Panthers**	21	3	7	0	**31**
Chargers	0	0	0	7	**7**

at Qualcomm Stadium, San Diego, California

- Date: December 16
- Game time: 1:05 pm. PST
- Game weather: 59 °F (15 °C), cloudy
- Game attendance: 53,832
- Referee: Terry McAulay
- TV announcers (Fox): Sam Rosen, Heath Evans and Jill Savage (blacked out locally)
- Box score

Game information

**First quarter**

- CAR – Mike Tolbert 1-yard run (Graham Gano kick), 8:29. Panthers 7–0. **Drive: 13 plays, 80 yards, 6:31.**
- CAR – Mike Tolbert 1-yard run (Graham Gano kick), 4:54. Panthers 14–0. **Drive: 4 plays, 21 yards, 1:36.**
- CAR – DeAngelo Williams 45-yard pass from Cam Newton (Graham Gano kick), 0:58. Panthers 21–0. **Drive: 6 plays, 72 yards, 2:47.**

**Second quarter**

- CAR – Graham Gano 33-yard field goal, 0:06. Panthers 24–0. **Drive: 10 plays, 61 yards, 1:29.**

**Third quarter**

- CAR – Steve Smith Sr. 4-yard pass from Cam Newton (Graham Gano kick), 8:56. Panthers 31–0. **Drive: 8 plays, 56 yards, 4:44.**

**Fourth quarter**

- SD – Antonio Gates 9-yard pass from Philip Rivers (Nick Novak kick), 14:02. Panthers 31–7. **Drive: 5 plays, 38 yards, 2:07.**

**Top passers**

- CAR – Cam Newton – 19/33, 231 yards, 2 TD
- SD – Philip Rivers – 16/23, 121 yards, TD

**Top rushers**

- CAR – DeAngelo Williams – 22 rushes, 93 yards
- SD – Curtis Brinkley – 6 rushes, 42 yards

**Top receivers**

- CAR – Steve Smith Sr. – 6 receptions, 57 yards, TD
- SD – Malcom Floyd – 2 receptions, 39 yards

With the loss, the Chargers fell to 5–9 and were officially eliminated from playoff contention for the third-straight year. The Chargers' home crowd of 53,832 was their lowest since 2004. It was their third-straight blackout at home and fourth of the season. San Diego's home finale against the Raiders sold out, thus ending the home blackout streak. The team finished the season 0–4 against NFC opponents and had their first losing season since 2003.

==== Week 16: at New York Jets ====
Week Sixteen: San Diego Chargers at New York Jets – Game summary

Quarter	1	2	3	4	Total
**Chargers**	7	3	14	3	**27**
Jets	14	0	0	3	**17**

at MetLife Stadium, East Rutherford, New Jersey

- Date: December 23
- Game time: 1:00 pm. EST/10:00 am. PST
- Game weather: 39 °F (4 °C), sunny
- Game attendance: 79,088
- Referee: Pete Morelli
- TV announcers (CBS): Marv Albert and Rich Gannon
- Box score

Game information

**First quarter**

- SD – Micheal Spurlock 63-yard punt return (Nick Novak kick), 13:01. Chargers 7–0.
- NYJ – Shonn Greene 1-yard run (Nick Folk kick), 9:20. Tied 7–7. **Drive: 7 plays, 83 yards, 3:41.**
- NYJ – Shonn Greene 1-yard run (Nick Folk kick), 4:13. Jets 14–7. **Drive: 7 plays, 58 yards, 3:28.**

**Second quarter**

- SD – Nick Novak 51-yard field goal, 8:32. Jets 14–10. **Drive: 11 plays, 50 yards, 6:54.**

**Third quarter**

- SD – Danario Alexander 37-yard pass from Philip Rivers (Nick Novak kick), 11:11. Chargers 17–14. **Drive: 8 plays, 81 yards, 3:49.**
- SD – Antonio Gates 34-yard pass from Philip Rivers (Nick Novak kick), 1:34. Chargers 24–14. **Drive: 4 plays, 38 yards, 1:41.**

**Fourth quarter**

- SD – Nick Novak 27-yard field goal, 14:07. Chargers 27–14. **Drive: 4 plays, 9 yards, 1:03.**
- NYJ – Nick Folk 40-yard field goal, 11:08. Chargers 27–17. **Drive: 7 plays, 38 yards, 2:59.**

**Top passers**

- SD – Philip Rivers – 11/22, 165 yards, 2 TD
- NYJ – Greg McElroy – 14/24, 185 yards, INT

**Top rushers**

- SD – Jackie Battle – 19 rushes, 49 yards
- NYJ – Shonn Greene – 14 rushes, 38 yards, 2 TD

**Top receivers**

- SD – Danario Alexander – 3 receptions, 69 yards, TD
- NYJ – Clyde Gates – 3 receptions, 65 yards

==== Week 17: vs. Oakland Raiders ====
Week Seventeen: Oakland Raiders at San Diego Chargers – Game summary

Quarter	1	2	3	4	Total
Raiders	0	7	0	14	**21**
**Chargers**	10	7	7	0	**24**

at Qualcomm Stadium, San Diego, California

- Date: December 30
- Game time: 1:25 pm. PST
- Game weather: 50 °F (10 °C), cloudy
- Game attendance: 66,486
- Referee: John Parry
- TV announcers (CBS): Bill Macatee and Steve Tasker
- Box score

Game information

**First quarter**

- SD – Micheal Spurlock 99-yard kickoff return (Nick Novak kick), 14:48. Chargers 7–0. **Drive: 0 plays, 0 yards, 0:12.**
- SD – Nick Novak 30-yard field goal, 4:11. Chargers 10–0. **Drive: 9 plays, 59 yards, 5:20.**

**Second quarter**

- OAK – Darrius Heyward-Bey 9-yard pass from Terrelle Pryor (Sebastian Janikowski kick), 12:11. Chargers 10–7. **Drive: 12 plays, 80 yards, 7:00.**
- SD – Antonio Gates 11-yard pass from Philip Rivers (Nate Kaeding kick), 2:48. Chargers 17–7. **Drive: 14 plays, 81 yards, 9:23.**

**Third quarter**

- SD – Danario Alexander 34-yard pass from Philip Rivers (Nick Novak kick), 4:59. Chargers 24–7. **Drive: 4 plays, 47 yards, 2:11.**

**Fourth quarter**

- OAK – Terrelle Pryor 3-yard run (Sebastian Janikowski kick), 7:43. Chargers 24–14. **Drive: 8 plays, 76 yards, 5:19.**
- OAK – Denarius Moore 5-yard pass from Terrelle Pryor (Sebastian Janikowski kick), 1:52. Chargers 24–21. **Drive: 3 plays, 11 yards, 0:53.**

**Top passers**

- OAK – Terrelle Pryor – 13/28, 150 yards, 2 TD, INT
- SD – Philip Rivers – 13/17, 151 yards, 2 TD

**Top rushers**

- OAK – Darren McFadden – 19 rushes, 57 yards
- SD – Jackie Battle – 19 rushes, 37 yards

**Top receivers**

- OAK – Rod Streater – 4 receptions, 77 yards
- SD – Eddie Royal – 4 receptions, 61 yards

== Standings ==
AFC West
	W	L	T	PCT	DIV	CONF	PF	PA	STK
^{(1)} Denver Broncos	13	3	0	.813	6–0	10–2	481	289	W11
San Diego Chargers	7	9	0	.438	4–2	7–5	350	350	W2
Oakland Raiders	4	12	0	.250	2–4	4–8	290	443	L2
Kansas City Chiefs	2	14	0	.125	0–6	0–12	211	425	L4
