= Shaun Phillips =

American football player (born 1981)

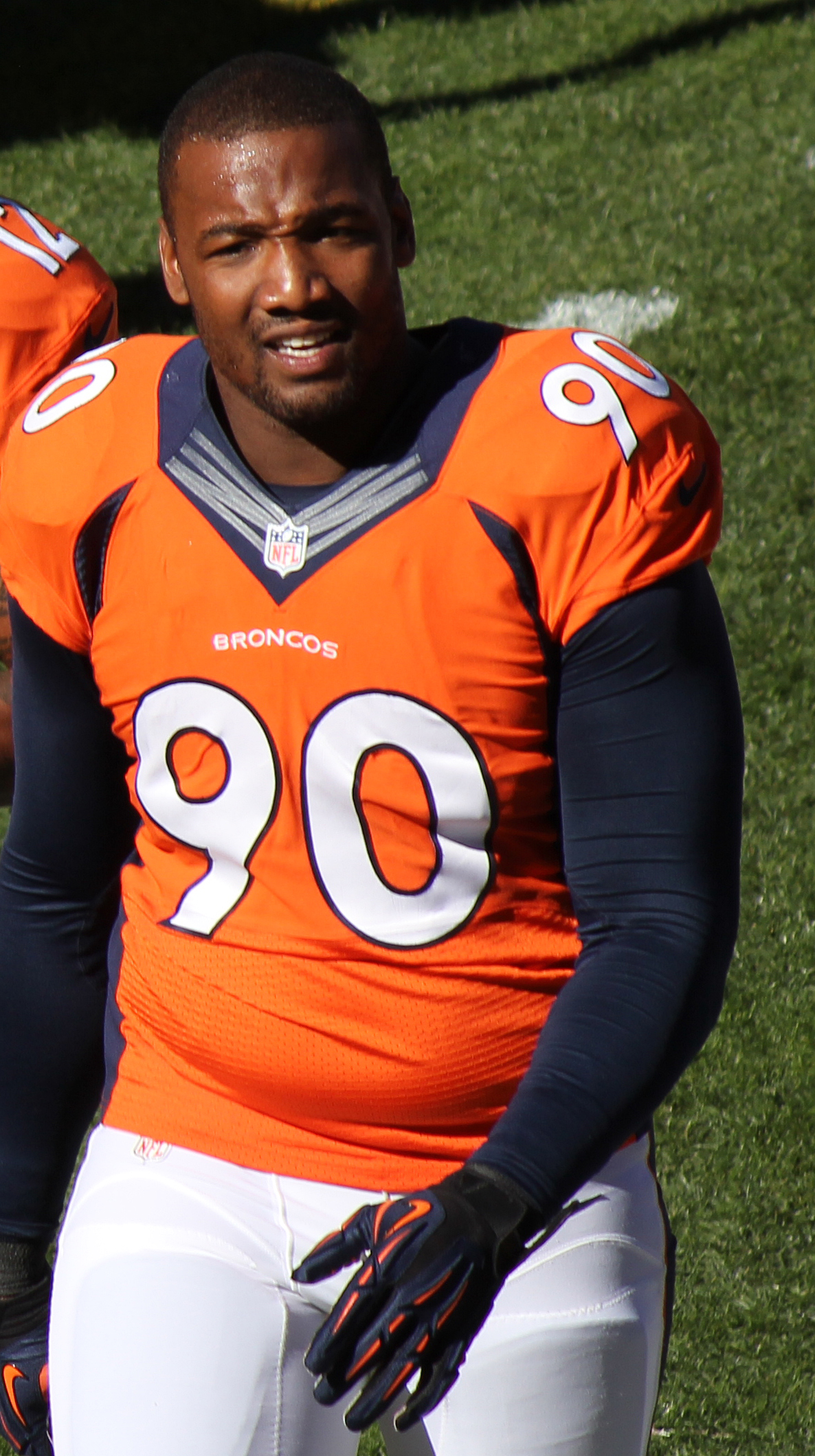
- Phillips with the Denver Broncos in 2013

No. 95, 90, 55, 58
- Position: Linebacker

Personal information
- Born: May 13, 1981 (age 45); Philadelphia, Pennsylvania, U.S.
- Listed height: 6 ft 3 in (1.91 m)
- Listed weight: 255 lb (116 kg)

Career information
- High school: Willingboro (Willingboro Township, New Jersey)
- College: Purdue (2000–2003)
- NFL draft: 2004: 4th round, 98th overall pick

Career history
- San Diego Chargers (2004–2012); Denver Broncos (2013); Tennessee Titans (2014); Indianapolis Colts (2014)

Awards and highlights
- Pro Bowl (2010); NFL forced fumbles leader (2009); Second-team All-American (2003); First-team All-Big Ten (2003)

Career NFL statistics
- Total tackles: 537
- Sacks: 81.5
- Forced fumbles: 22
- Fumble recoveries: 10
- Interceptions: 7
- Defensive touchdowns: 3
- Stats at Pro Football Reference

Shaun Jamal Phillips (born May 13, 1981) is an American former professional football player who was a linebacker in the National Football League (NFL). He played college football for the Purdue Boilermakers and was selected by the San Diego Chargers in the fourth round of the 2004 NFL draft. Phillips also played for the Denver Broncos, Tennessee Titans, and Indianapolis Colts.

== Early life ==
Phillips grew up in Willingboro, New Jersey and attended Willingboro High School, lettering in football, basketball, and track. In football, he was an All-South Jersey selection, and an All-State selection.

== College career ==
Phillips accepted a scholarship offer to attend Purdue University following high school, choosing Purdue in part due to his desire to catch passes from quarterback Drew Brees as a tight end.

After being forced to sit out his freshman season due to low standardized test scores, Phillips was immediately assigned to the defensive side of the ball, and started as a freshman at defensive end. He earned All-Big Ten honorable mention in each of his first three seasons.

As a senior, Phillips totaled 14.5 sacks, pushing his career total to 33.5, a school record, highlighted by a 3.5 sack performance in Purdue's 26–23 win at Wisconsin Badgers. He was named a second-team All-American and first-team All-Big Ten performer. Phillips started 49 consecutive games as a Boilermaker.

Phillips was often used on offense as a tight end in goal line situations, and caught two touchdown passes during his career. He completed his collegiate career at Purdue University as the school's all-time leader with 33.5 career sacks while ranking third in team annals with 60.5 tackles for a loss.

Phillips graduated from Purdue University in May 2003 with a degree in restaurant, hotel and institutional management.

== Professional career ==
Pre-draft measurables
Height	Weight	Arm length	Hand span	40-yard dash	10-yard split	20-yard split	20-yard shuttle	Three-cone drill	Vertical jump	Broad jump	Bench press
6 ft 3 1/8 in (1.91 m)	255 lb (116 kg)	33 5/8 in (0.85 m)	9 in (0.23 m)	4.66 s	1.68 s	2.77 s	4.21 s	6.56 s	33.5 in (0.85 m)	9 ft 6 in (2.90 m)	19 reps
All values from NFL Combine/Pro Day

=== San Diego Chargers ===
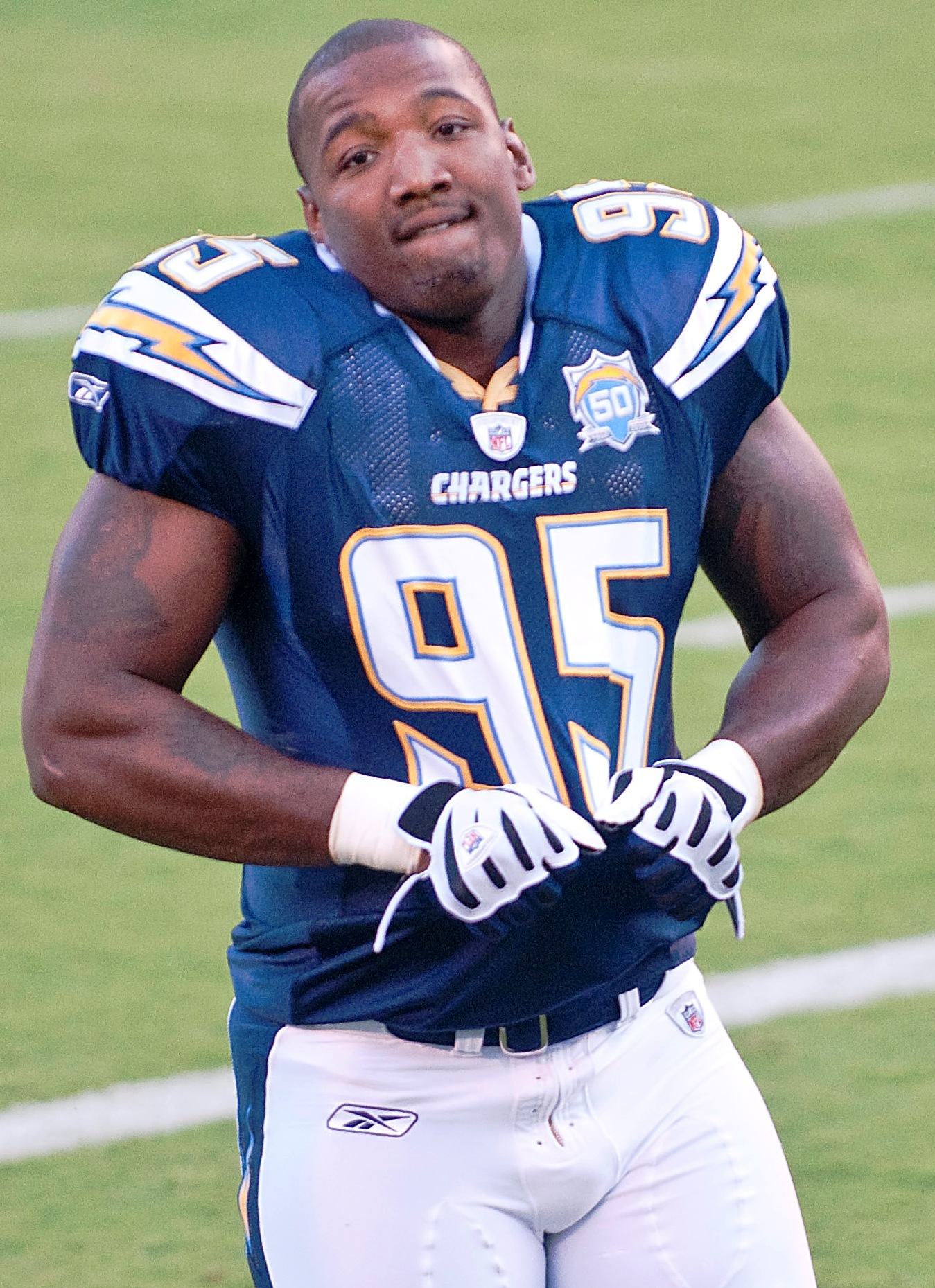
Phillips playing for the Chargers in 2009.

Phillips was selected by the Chargers 98th overall in the fourth round of the 2004 NFL draft and was the third Purdue player selected after Nick Hardwick and Stuart Schweigert, who both went in the third round.

In his rookie season, Philips was used as a backup pass rush specialist. He earned his first NFL sack in his NFL debut in Week 1 against the Houston Texans. He played in all 16 games and was tied for second on the team with four sacks.

In the 2005 season, in the same role, Philips had seven sacks and three forced fumbles while playing alongside rookie sensation Shawne Merriman. He appeared in 15 games and started three.

On April 14, 2006, Shaun Phillips was arrested after he scuffled with a patrol officer. Phillips, then 24, was booked into San Diego County jail on a charge of obstructing or resisting an officer in the performance of his duty. Phillips was freed after posting $10,000 bail, according to the Sheriff's Department.

Prior to the 2006 season, Phillips had mostly been used as a pass rush specialist rather than an every-down linebacker. With the September 2006 shooting of teammate Steve Foley, Phillips moved into the starting right outside linebacker spot previously occupied by Foley. He made an instant impact and finished his first season as a starter tied for ninth in sacks in the NFL despite missing two games with a mid-season calf injury. He and Shawne Merriman produced 28 sacks as they formed one of the best pass rush in the NFL. Philips finished with 65 tackles, 11.5 sacks, six pass breakups and four forced fumbles despite missing two games with an ankle injury.

Following the 2006 season, the Chargers signed Shaun Phillips to a six-year extension through 2012. The deal guaranteed him $13 million over the first two years. He was originally scheduled for restricted free agency.

In his fourth season, he emerged as a leader on the defense. In Week 15, against the Detroit Lions, he had a 18-yard interception return for a touchdown in the 51–14 victory. He started in 15 games and tacked on 68 tackles, 8.5 sacks, and two interceptions in the 2007 season.

In Week 14 of the 2008 season against the Oakland Raiders, Phillips had 2.5 sacks in the 34–7 victory. In the 2008 season, he appeared in 16 games with 16 starts. He recorded 76 total tackles, 7.5 sacks and four passes defended.

In 2009, Philips led the NFL with a career-best seven forced fumbles in 2009 while leading San Diego to its fourth consecutive AFC West title. Before the season, Phillips was cited for misdemeanor battery for allegedly striking a security guard in the face at a downtown hotel early Sunday morning. It was Phillips' second run-in with the law in three seasons.

In the 2010 season, the pass rusher played in all 16 games and finished with 55 tackles and a team-high 11 sacks. He registered an interception that he returned 31 yards for a touchdown in Week 4 against the Arizona Cardinals. He was named to his first Pro Bowl. He was named AFC Defensive Player of the Week after producing a career-high four sacks and an interception returned for a touchdown vs. Arizona He was ranked 97th by his fellow players on the NFL Top 100 Players of 2011.

Coming off a Pro Bowl year, Phillips was hurt and slowed by a lingering foot injury. He had 3.5 sacks, a career low, and two interceptions in 12 games and starts in the 2011 season.

In the 2012 season, Phillips appeared in and started all 16 games. In Week 9 against the Kansas City Chiefs, he had a defensive fumble recovery for a touchdown in the 31–13 victory. In Week 11, against the Tennessee Titans, he recorded a safety on a sack in the 30–23 loss. He had 9.5 sacks, 50 total tackles, three passes defended, and two forced fumbles.

=== Denver Broncos ===
On April 27, 2013, Phillips signed with the Denver Broncos. On June 24, 2013, Phillips says he accepted less money to play for the Broncos. "That's why I came here, to be in this situation, to be with a team that is right there in the mix," Phillips said.

In his debut as a Bronco, Phillips had 2.5 sacks on Baltimore Ravens quarterback Joe Flacco. In Week 8, Phillips intercepted Washington quarterback Kirk Cousins, to seal the game for the Broncos. On the season, he played in all 16 games, starting 12 (including the final 9 straight), finishing the season with 35 tackles (28 solo), 10 sacks, a pair of forced fumbles, an interception, and five blocked passes.

In the Divisional Round of the playoffs, Phillips recorded two sacks in the 24–17 victory over the San Diego Chargers. Phillips played in Super Bowl XLVIII against the Seattle Seahawks. He had four total tackles in the 43–8 loss.

=== Tennessee Titans ===
Phillips signed with the Tennessee Titans on March 28, 2014. On November 25, 2014, Phillips was released by the Titans.

=== Indianapolis Colts ===
Phillips was signed off waivers by the Indianapolis Colts on November 26, 2014. With both the Titans and the Colts, Phillips played in all 16 games and started one. He finished with two sacks, 24 total tackles, and two passes defended. He was released on February 16, 2015.

=== NFL career statistics ===
Legend
	Led the league
**Bold**	Career high

Year	Team	G	Comb	Solo	Ast	Sacks	FF	FR	INT	PD
2004	SD	16	26	21	5	4.0	0	2	1	3
2005	SD	15	34	32	2	7.0	3	1	0	1
2006	SD	14	65	42	**23**	**11.5**	4	1	0	6
2007	SD	15	68	**52**	16	8.5	3	0	**2**	5
2008	SD	16	**74**	**52**	22	7.5	1	1	0	4
2009	SD	16	59	47	12	7.0	**7**	0	0	3
2010	SD	16	55	47	8	11.0	0	1	1	**7**
2011	SD	12	42	29	13	3.5	0	0	**2**	5
2012	SD	16	50	33	17	9.5	2	**3**	0	3
2013	DEN	16	35	28	7	10.0	2	0	1	5
2014	TEN	11	19	12	7	2.0	0	0	0	2
2014	IND	5	5	4	1	0.0	0	0	0	0
Career		**168**	**532**	**399**	**133**	**81.5**	**22**	**9**	**7**	**44**
