= Curtis Brinkley =

American football player (born 1985)

No. 36, 44
- Position: Running back

Personal information
- Born: September 20, 1985 (age 41); Philadelphia, Pennsylvania, U.S.
- Listed height: 5 ft 9 in (1.75 m)
- Listed weight: 208 lb (94 kg)

Career information
- College: Syracuse
- NFL draft: 2009: undrafted

Career history
- San Diego Chargers (2009−2012); Chicago Bears (2013)*
- * Offseason or practice squad member only

Career NFL statistics
- Rushing attempts: 71
- Rushing yards: 227
- Rushing touchdowns: 1
- Receptions: 19
- Receiving yards: 118
- Stats at Pro Football Reference

Curtis Brinkley (born September 20, 1985) is an American former professional football player who was a running back in the National Football League (NFL). He was signed by the San Diego Chargers as an undrafted free agent in 2009. He played college football for the Syracuse Orange.

He was also a member of the Chicago Bears.

== Early life ==
Brinkley was born on September 20, 1985, in Philadelphia, Pennsylvania. He attended both West Catholic Preparatory High School and Hargrave Military Academy. During his career he set Philadelphia city records with 1,007 carries and rushing for 300 yards five times. As a senior, he was named all-city along with rushing for 2,813 yards. He finished his high school career with 7,429 yards and scoring 85 touchdowns in four years. Those stats broke the record of current Chicago Bears running back Kevin Jones. In 2004, at Hargrave he faced competition from Robert Barcliff and Andre Brown. During his time in high school, Brinkley was nicknamed "Boonah". Brinkley was the MVP of the 2004 Big 33 game.

== College career ==
Entering college, Brinkley was named a PrepStar All-American and was rated as the 12th best running back by Rivals.com. On October 6, 2005, against Florida State saw playing time as a kick returner. As a senior, Brinkley ran for 1,165 rushing yards and scored 14 touchdowns with 237 carries.

== Professional career ==
=== San Diego Chargers ===
After going unselected in the 2009 NFL draft, Brinkley was signed by the San Diego Chargers as an undrafted free agent. He was waived on September 4, 2010, but was re-signed the following day to the practice squad. He was promoted to the active roster on September 25, only to be waived on September 28 and re-signed to the practice squad on October 1. The Chargers promoted him to the active roster again on November 22. Brinkley was waived on December 16 and re-signed to the practice squad on December 19. However, he was promoted to the active roster again on December 31, where he finished the season. The following season, he was waived during final cuts again and was later re-signed to the practice squad on September 12, 2011. On September 15, he was released, only to be re-added to the practice squad on September 17. The Chargers released him again a week later, but again re-signed him on September 28. Brinkley was promoted to the active roster on October 22. Brinkley scored his first career touchdown on October 31, 2011, in a Monday Night Football game at Kansas City. He totaled 43 yards on 10 carries, reaching the end zone on a 2-yard score. However, Brinkley was diagnosed with a concussion after the game.

=== Chicago Bears ===
On August 12, 2013, Brinkley signed a one-year contract with the Chicago Bears. He was waived on August 25.

== Shooting ==
On July 10, 2009, Brinkley was shot multiple times by an unknown gunman while his car was stopped in the Philadelphia suburb of Cheltenham Township. After the shooting, Anthony Peterson Jr., 25, the boyfriend of Brinkley's sister, admitted to firing the shots, which were intended for a romantic rival. Peterson was convicted of one count each of attempted murder and aggravated assault, both first-degree felonies, and sentenced to seven to 14 years in state prison. Following the shooting, Brinkley was taken to Albert Einstein Medical Center and was listed in stable condition. His shooting makes it the third time in six years a Chargers player was shot, Terrence Kiel was shot in 2003 and Steve Foley was shot in 2006.
