= Gorilla Gold Grip Enhancer =

Grip towel used for sports

Gorilla Gold Grip Enhancer is a towel used by athletes to improve their grip on sports equipment. The product releases a wax-based substance that repels moisture. It is effective in sports that require good grips, such as American football, baseball, softball, golf, tennis, hockey, and weightlifting.

Major League Baseball in 2001 approved the use of Gorilla Gold in major and minor league games as an alternative to pine tar. In 2012, National Football League (NFL) game officials were suspicious of the San Diego Chargers' use of Gorilla Grip. The league later ruled that the Chargers did not violate any rules by using the towels, but the NFL subsequently prohibited its use.
