= 2012 NFL season =

American football season

Regular season
- Duration: September 5 – December 30, 2012

Playoffs
- Start date: January 5, 2013
- AFC Champions: Baltimore Ravens
- NFC Champions: San Francisco 49ers

Super Bowl XLVII
- Date: February 3, 2013
- Site: Mercedes-Benz Superdome, New Orleans, Louisiana
- Champions: Baltimore Ravens

Pro Bowl
- Date: January 27, 2013
- Site: Aloha Stadium, Honolulu, Hawaii

AFC teams: West, North, South, East
NFC teams: West, North, South, East

The 2012 NFL season was the 93rd season of the National Football League (NFL) and the 47th of the Super Bowl era. It began on Wednesday, September 5, 2012, with the defending Super Bowl XLVI champion New York Giants falling to the Dallas Cowboys in the 2012 NFL Kickoff game at MetLife Stadium, and ended with Super Bowl XLVII, the league's championship game, on Sunday, February 3, 2013, at the Mercedes-Benz Superdome in New Orleans, with the Jim Harbaugh-coached San Francisco 49ers facing the John Harbaugh-coached Baltimore Ravens. The Ravens won the game 34–31, which marked the first time two brothers were head coaches for opposing teams in the championship game.

== Referee labor dispute ==
In 2005, the NFL and NFL Referees Association (NFLRA) agreed to a contract that would last through the 2011 season. In 2011, the officials' union had planned to use a contract clause to reopen negotiations a year early, but this failed to occur due to the 2011 NFL lockout.

By June 2012, the league and the officials' union had not yet come to terms on a new collective bargaining agreement, thus failing to resolve the labor dispute. The main issues between the union and the league were changes to the retirement plan, salaries, and personnel. On June 4, 2012, the NFL announced it would begin hiring replacement officials.

On September 26, 2012, an agreement was reached to end the lockout after increasing criticism of the NFL and the performance of the replacement officials. The contentious nature of the replacement officials' decision at the end of the Green Bay Packers–Seattle Seahawks game two days earlier was widely considered to have been the tipping point that finally led to an agreement. NFL Commissioner Roger Goodell acknowledged that the game "may have pushed the parties further along" in negotiations.

== Player movement ==
The 2012 NFL League year and trading period began at 4pm EST on March 13 2012, which marked the start of the league's free agency period. The per-team salary cap was set at US$120,600,000, marginally increased from US$120,000,000 the previous year.

=== Free agency ===
Notable players to change teams during free agency included:

- Quarterbacks Jason Campbell (Oakland to Chicago), Matt Flynn (Green Bay to Seattle), Chad Henne (Miami to Jacksonville), Peyton Manning (Indianapolis to Denver) and Kyle Orton (Kansas City to Dallas)
- Running backs Cedric Benson (Cincinnati to Green Bay), Michael Bush (Oakland to Chicago) and BenJarvus Green-Ellis (New England to Cincinnati)
- Fullbacks Le'Ron McClain (Kansas City to San Diego) and Mike Tolbert (San Diego to Carolina)
- Wide receivers Pierre Garcon (Indianapolis to Washington), Vincent Jackson (San Diego to Tampa Bay), Jacoby Jones (Houston to Baltimore), Brandon Lloyd (St. Louis to New England), Mario Manningham (New York Giants to San Francisco), Robert Meachem (New Orleans to San Diego), Laurent Robinson (Dallas to Jacksonville) and Eddie Royal (Denver to San Diego)
- Tight ends Martellus Bennett (Dallas to New York Giants), Kevin Boss (Oakland to Kansas City), John Carlson (Seattle to Minnesota), Dallas Clark (Indianapolis to Tampa Bay) and Jacob Tamme (Indianapolis to Denver)
- Offensive tackles Demetress Bell (Buffalo to Philadelphia) and Eric Winston (Houston to Kansas City)
- Guards Mike Brisiel (Houston to Oakland), Ben Grubbs (Baltimore to New Orleans), Steve Hutchinson (Minnesota to Tennessee) and Carl Nicks (New Orleans to Tampa Bay)
- Centers Jeff Saturday (Indianapolis to Green Bay) and Scott Wells (Green Bay to St. Louis)
- Defensive ends Mark Anderson (New England to Buffalo), Mario Williams (Houston to Buffalo) and Kamerion Wimbley (Oakland to Tennessee)
- Defensive tackles Brodrick Bunkley (Denver to New Orleans), Kendall Langford (Miami to St. Louis) and Cory Redding (Baltimore to Indianapolis)
- Linebackers David Hawthorne (Seattle to New Orleans), Jarret Johnson (Baltimore to San Diego) and Curtis Lofton (Atlanta to New Orleans)
- Cornerbacks Ronald Bartell (St. Louis to Oakland), Brandon Carr (Kansas City to Dallas), Cortland Finnegan (Tennessee to St. Louis), Richard Marshall (Arizona to Miami), Tracy Porter (New Orleans to Denver), Stanford Routt (Oakland to Kansas City) and Eric Wright (Detroit to Tampa Bay)
- Safeties Mike Adams (Cleveland to Denver) and LaRon Landry (Washington to New York Jets).

=== Trades ===
The following notable trades were made during the 2012 league year:

- March 14: Miami traded WR Brandon Marshall to Chicago in exchange for third-round selections in the 2012 and 2013 drafts.
- March 21: Houston traded LB DeMeco Ryans and their third-round selection to Philadelphia for their third- and fourth-round selections in the 2012 draft.
- March 26: Denver traded QB Tim Tebow and their seventh-round selection to New York Jets in exchange for fourth- and sixth-round selections.
- April 12: Cincinnati traded LB Keith Rivers to New York Giants in exchange for a fifth-round selection.
- April 26: Philadelphia traded CB Asante Samuel to Atlanta in exchange for a seventh-round selection.
- August 27: Miami traded CB Vontae Davis to Indianapolis in exchange for a second-round selection and a conditional sixth-round selection in 2013.
- November 1: Tampa Bay traded CB Aqib Talib and a seventh-round selection to New England for a fourth-round selection.

=== Draft ===
The 2012 NFL draft was held from April 26 to 28, 2012 at New York City's Radio City Music Hall. With the first pick, the Indianapolis Colts selected quarterback Andrew Luck from Stanford.

== Referee change ==
Bill Vinovich returned to the field as a substitute referee, working several games during the season. He was originally promoted to referee in 2004, but had to leave the field in 2007 because of a heart condition. During his recovery, he served as a replay official.

== Rule changes ==
The following rule changes have been approved by the competition committee for the 2012 season:

- The Replay Booth can initiate replay reviews on turnover plays at any time during the game, similar to a change made in the 2011 season regarding booth reviews on scoring plays outside of the final 2:00 of the game or in overtime. The penalty for throwing a challenge flag immediately after such "unchallengable" plays was also modified: in addition to the 15-yard unsportsmanlike conduct penalty, the Replay Booth will automatically rule that the call will stand without initiating a replay review. This part of the rule was repealed prior to the 2013 season.
- Instant Replay is also expanded to include the following situations
  - A Ruling of "runner out of Bounds" when there is a Fumble and a recovery following that fumble
  - A Ruling of "incomplete Forward Pass" when there is a Backward Pass and a recovery following the backward pass
- The penalty for 12 men on the field (not in the huddle) is changed from a live-ball foul to a dead-ball foul, with the whistle being blown if the defense has 12 men on the field and the "snap is imminent".
- Adding anyone who is subject to a crack-back block to the list of defenseless players.
- Last names on uniforms can now include generational suffixes such as Roman numerals (in the case of Robert Griffin III), Junior (Jr.), and Senior (Sr.) designations.
- Officials no longer could wear white knickers with their uniforms. The full length black pants with a white stripe down the side, worn for cold weather games since 2006, became mandatory for all games.
- The overtime rules in the playoffs (adopted for the 2010 season) would be extended to the pre-season and regular season. Instead of a straight sudden death, the game will not immediately end if the team that receives the ball first scores a field goal on its first possession (they can still win the game if they score a touchdown and the game will end if the defense scores a safety). Instead, the other team gets a possession. If the second team on offense then scores a touchdown, it is declared the winner. If the score is tied after both teams had a possession, whether both teams kicked a field goal or neither team scored, then it goes to sudden death. If the score remains tied at the end of overtime, the game ends in a tie.
  - The first regular season game that the new overtime rules were used was a Week 1 contest between the Jacksonville Jaguars and the Minnesota Vikings. Minnesota took the opening kickoff of overtime and scored on a field goal, then stopped Jacksonville on fourth down.
  - The first regular season game where both teams scored a field goal on their respective first possessions of overtime was the Week 11 game between the Jaguars and the Houston Texans. The Texans then won the game, becoming the first NFL team to score twice in overtime under the new format.

=== Other changes ===
On August 30, 2012, the owners and NFLPA agreed to the following changes regarding player movement:

- The trade deadline has been set as the Tuesday following week 8 of the season. Previously, the trade deadline was the Tuesday following week 6. The deadline was moved back another two days to November 1 due to potential complications regarding Hurricane Sandy as league offices were closed due to the storm.
- Teams may designate one player who had been placed on injured reserve prior to the start of the season to return to the 53-man roster later in the season and play. That player is eligible to return to practice after week 6 and to play after week 8.

== Regular season ==
=== Late doubleheader kickoff time change ===
The league announced on June 28 that all late Sunday doubleheader games will be moved ten minutes later from 4:15 p.m. ET to 4:25 p.m. Late games broadcast on the single game network will still remain at 4:05 p.m. The league cited 44 early games from the 2009 to 2011 seasons in which part of the audience had to be switched immediately to the kickoff of their home team's doubleheader game, and thus miss the end of the first game. The late Dallas Thanksgiving game's kickoff time was also moved from 4:15 p.m. ET to 4:30 p.m. ET. The 4:15 p.m. late doubleheader kickoff time dates back to the 1998 season when the NFL moved it from 4:05 p.m. for the same reason.

=== Matchups ===
As per the NFL's scheduling formula, the intraconference and interconference matchups were:

Intraconference

- AFC East vs. AFC South
- AFC North vs. AFC West
- NFC East vs. NFC South
- NFC North vs. NFC West

Interconference

- AFC East vs. NFC West
- AFC North vs. NFC East
- AFC South vs. NFC North
- AFC West vs. NFC South

=== Other highlights ===
Highlights of the 2012 schedule include:

- NFL Kickoff Game: The 2012 regular season began on Wednesday, September 5, as the defending Super Bowl XLVI champion New York Giants hosted the Dallas Cowboys, and the Cowboys beat the Giants 24–17. The game was moved from its usual Thursday slot to avoid conflict with the last day of the Democratic National Convention.
- More Thursday night games: On February 3, 2012, commissioner Roger Goodell announced that the number of Thursday night games on the NFL Network will increase from eight to 13 games from weeks 2 through 15, excluding Week 12 (the Thanksgiving night game will now air on NBC). This will ensure that every team will have at least one prime time game.
- International Series: The 2012 International Series game featured the St. Louis Rams hosting the New England Patriots on October 28, at 1:00 p.m. EDT (5:00 p.m. GMT) on CBS, at the permanent International Series home—Wembley Stadium in London, England. The Patriots won the game 45–7. Though the league had originally promised to add a second game in Ireland, Scotland or Wales beginning in 2012, the league canceled the game, citing the 2012 Summer Olympics in London as a conflict (the league canceled a second International Series game in 2010 as well, citing the ongoing negotiations of the collective bargaining agreement). This was to be the first of three consecutive International Series appearances for the Rams, but the Rams announced they would no longer take part in the 2013 and 2014 editions due to fan backlash in St. Louis; beginning in 2013, the Jacksonville Jaguars will serve as the permanent International Series tenant instead.
- Redskins Rule: The last Washington Redskins home game before the 2012 presidential election took place on November 4 against the Carolina Panthers. According to the "Redskins Rule", because the Redskins lost that game 21–13, the incumbent president was forecast to lose his bid for re-election on Election Day. In the end, the Redskins Rule failed to come to fruition.
- Thanksgiving Day games: Three games were played on Thursday, November 22. The two traditional Thanksgiving games saw the Houston Texans defeat the Detroit Lions, 34–31 in overtime; followed by the Washington Redskins defeating their longtime division rivals, the Dallas Cowboys, 38–31. In the prime-time Thanksgiving game, which for the first time aired on NBC, the New England Patriots defeated the New York Jets 49–19. The Patriots scored 35 points in the second quarter, including a return of the "Butt Fumble" for a touchdown. Prior to 2012, the prime-time Thanksgiving game aired on NFL Network.
- Bills Toronto Series. The fifth and, under current contract, final regular-season game of the series, which saw the Buffalo Bills play in Toronto's Rogers Centre, featured the Bills hosting the Seattle Seahawks on December 16. The Seahawks defeated the Bills 50–17. Due to a re-emergence of late-season attendance problems at Ralph Wilson Stadium, the Toronto Series will return to its original timing after the end of the 2012 CFL season. Although a preseason game was originally going to be played in 2012 as part of the series, it was canceled due to a lack of available dates at the Rogers Centre.
- Christmas Eve: Christmas Eve fell on a Monday in 2012. Since the NFL usually avoids scheduling games on the night of Christmas Eve, the ESPN Monday Night game for that week was instead played on Saturday, December 22, between the Atlanta Falcons and the Detroit Lions. It was the only Saturday game played during the 2012 regular season and the Falcons won the game 31–18. This also prevented a conflict with ESPN also covering the college football bowl game, the Hawaii Bowl which was played on December 24.
- Playoffs: The last regular season games were held on Sunday, December 30. The playoffs started on Saturday, January 5, 2013 and the conference championship games were held on Sunday, January 20; the NFC Championship was played at 3:00 p.m. EST on Fox, and the AFC Championship followed at 6:30 p.m. EST on CBS. Super Bowl XLVII, the league's championship game, was on February 3 at the Mercedes-Benz Superdome in New Orleans, Louisiana, and was televised on CBS with kickoff around 6:20 p.m. EST. Pre-game programming began that morning with CBS News Sunday Morning and Face the Nation being Super Bowl-centric followed by "official" pregame programming.

The Pro Football Hall of Fame Game was played August 5 and featured a match-up between the Arizona Cardinals and the New Orleans Saints. The Saints last appeared in the game in 2007; former Saints offensive tackle Willie Roaf was inducted as part of the Hall of Fame ceremonies. The Cardinals played there for the first time since 1986, when the franchise was still located in St. Louis. As with the originally announced 2011 game, this matchup broke from the game's usual tradition of featuring two teams from opposing conferences (the 2011 Hall of Fame Game would've featured the Chicago Bears and St. Louis Rams, but the game was canceled due to the 2011 NFL lockout). The game, normally airing on NBC, instead aired this season on NFL Network due to NBC airing the 2012 Summer Olympics, as it had done in 2007. The Saints defeated the Cardinals, 17–10. The remainder of the 2012 preseason matchups were revealed on April 4.

The November 11 game between the San Francisco 49ers and the St. Louis Rams ended in a rare tied game, with each team scoring 24 points, none in the overtime period. Prior to this, the last tie game had been in 2008.

The 2013 Pro Bowl was held in Hawaii on January 27, 2013, after New Orleans was briefly considered as a site. Originally, the NFL delayed announcing a date or venue for the game, and even considered eliminating the game altogether due to the NFL's displeasure with the quality of play in the 2012 Pro Bowl.

=== Scheduling changes ===
The following games were rescheduled by the NFL using flexible scheduling to promote what the NFL deems to be its best games, typically because of their playoff implications:

- Week 11: The Indianapolis–New England game was moved from 1:00 p.m. EST to 4:25 p.m. EST.
- Week 16: The San Francisco–Seattle game, originally scheduled at 4:25 p.m. EST on Fox, was flexed into the 8:20 p.m. EST time slot on NBC Sunday Night Football. The San Diego–New York Jets game, originally scheduled at that time and network, was moved back to the 1:00 p.m. EST time slot on CBS, while the New York Giants–Baltimore game was moved from 1:00 p.m. EST to 4:25 p.m. EST.
- Week 17: The Dallas–Washington game, originally scheduled at 1:00 p.m. EST, was selected as the final Sunday Night Football game, which for the second consecutive season decided the NFC East division champion. The Miami–New England and Green Bay–Minnesota games were moved from 1:00 p.m. EST to 4:25 p.m. EST.

== Regular season standings ==
=== Division ===
AFC East
	W	L	T	PCT	DIV	CONF	PF	PA	STK
^{(2)} New England Patriots	12	4	0	.750	6–0	11–1	557	331	W2
Miami Dolphins	7	9	0	.438	2–4	5–7	288	317	L1
New York Jets	6	10	0	.375	2–4	4–8	281	375	L3
Buffalo Bills	6	10	0	.375	2–4	5–7	344	435	W1

AFC North
	W	L	T	PCT	DIV	CONF	PF	PA	STK
^{(4)} Baltimore Ravens	10	6	0	.625	4–2	8–4	398	344	L1
^{(6)} Cincinnati Bengals	10	6	0	.625	3–3	7–5	391	320	W3
Pittsburgh Steelers	8	8	0	.500	3–3	5–7	336	314	W1
Cleveland Browns	5	11	0	.313	2–4	5–7	302	368	L3

AFC South
	W	L	T	PCT	DIV	CONF	PF	PA	STK
^{(3)} Houston Texans	12	4	0	.750	5–1	10–2	416	331	L2
^{(5)} Indianapolis Colts	11	5	0	.688	4–2	8–4	357	387	W2
Tennessee Titans	6	10	0	.375	1–5	5–7	330	471	W1
Jacksonville Jaguars	2	14	0	.125	2–4	2–10	255	444	L5

AFC West
	W	L	T	PCT	DIV	CONF	PF	PA	STK
^{(1)} Denver Broncos	13	3	0	.813	6–0	10–2	481	289	W11
San Diego Chargers	7	9	0	.438	4–2	7–5	350	350	W2
Oakland Raiders	4	12	0	.250	2–4	4–8	290	443	L2
Kansas City Chiefs	2	14	0	.125	0–6	0–12	211	425	L4

NFC East
	W	L	T	PCT	DIV	CONF	PF	PA	STK
^{(4)} Washington Redskins	10	6	0	.625	5–1	8–4	436	388	W7
New York Giants	9	7	0	.563	3–3	8–4	429	344	W1
Dallas Cowboys	8	8	0	.500	3–3	5–7	376	400	L2
Philadelphia Eagles	4	12	0	.250	1–5	2–10	280	444	L3

NFC North
	W	L	T	PCT	DIV	CONF	PF	PA	STK
^{(3)} Green Bay Packers	11	5	0	.688	5–1	8–4	433	336	L1
^{(6)} Minnesota Vikings	10	6	0	.625	4–2	7–5	379	348	W4
Chicago Bears	10	6	0	.625	3–3	7–5	375	277	W2
Detroit Lions	4	12	0	.250	0–6	3–9	372	437	L8

NFC South
	W	L	T	PCT	DIV	CONF	PF	PA	STK
^{(1)} Atlanta Falcons	13	3	0	.813	3–3	9–3	419	299	L1
Carolina Panthers	7	9	0	.438	3–3	5–7	357	363	W4
New Orleans Saints	7	9	0	.438	3–3	5–7	461	454	L1
Tampa Bay Buccaneers	7	9	0	.438	3–3	4–8	389	394	W1

NFC West
	W	L	T	PCT	DIV	CONF	PF	PA	STK
^{(2)} San Francisco 49ers	11	4	1	.719	3–2–1	7–4–1	397	273	W1
^{(5)} Seattle Seahawks	11	5	0	.688	3–3	8–4	412	245	W5
St. Louis Rams	7	8	1	.469	4–1–1	6–5–1	299	348	L1
Arizona Cardinals	5	11	0	.313	1–5	3–9	250	357	L2

=== Conference ===
AFC
#	Team	Division	W	L	T	PCT	DIV	CONF	SOS	SOV	STK
Division winners
1	Denver Broncos	West	13	3	0	.813	6–0	10–2	.457	.385	W11
2 (Note: New England clinched the AFC's No. 2 seed over Houston based on a head-to-head victory.)	New England Patriots	East	12	4	0	.750	6–0	11–1	.496	.466	W2
3	Houston Texans	South	12	4	0	.750	5–1	10–2	.496	.432	L2
4 (Note: Baltimore clinched the AFC North title over Cincinnati based on a better divisional record (4–2 to 3–3).)	Baltimore Ravens	North	10	6	0	.625	4–2	8–4	.496	.438	L1
Wild cards
5	Indianapolis Colts	South	11	5	0	.688	4–2	8–4	.441	.403	W2
6	Cincinnati Bengals	North	10	6	0	.625	3–3	7–5	.438	.381	W3
Did not qualify for the postseason
7	Pittsburgh Steelers	North	8	8	0	.500	3–3	5–7	.465	.438	W1
8 (Note: San Diego finished with a better conference record than Miami (7–5 to 5–7).)	San Diego Chargers	West	7	9	0	.438	4–2	7–5	.457	.286	W2
9	Miami Dolphins	East	7	9	0	.438	2–4	5–7	.500	.415	L1
10 (Note: Tennessee finished ahead of New York Jets based on head-to-head victory.)	Tennessee Titans	South	6	10	0	.375	1–5	5–7	.512	.344	W1
11 (Note: New York Jets finished ahead of Buffalo in the AFC East based on record versus common opponents (5–7 to 3–9).)	New York Jets	East	6	10	0	.375	2–4	4–8	.512	.401	L3
12	Buffalo Bills	East	6	10	0	.375	2–4	5–7	.480	.281	W1
13	Cleveland Browns	North	5	11	0	.313	2–4	5–7	.508	.388	L3
14	Oakland Raiders	West	4	12	0	.250	2–4	4–8	.469	.219	L2
15 (Note: Jacksonville finished with a better conference record than Kansas City (2–10 to 0–12).)	Jacksonville Jaguars	South	2	14	0	.125	2–4	2–10	.539	.531	L5
16	Kansas City Chiefs	West	2	14	0	.125	0–6	0–12	.516	.438	L4
Tiebreakers (Note: When breaking ties for three or more teams under the NFL's rules, they are first broken within divisions, then comparing only the highest ranked remaining team from each division.)

NFC
#	Team	Division	W	L	T	PCT	DIV	CONF	SOS	SOV	STK
Division winners
1	Atlanta Falcons	South	13	3	0	.813	3–3	9–3	.422	.418	L1
2	San Francisco 49ers	West	11	4	1	.719	3–2–1	7–4–1	.504	.477	W1
3	Green Bay Packers	North	11	5	0	.688	5–1	8–4	.508	.440	L1
4	Washington Redskins	East	10	6	0	.625	5–1	8–4	.494	.450	W7
Wild cards
5	Seattle Seahawks	West	11	5	0	.688	3–3	8–4	.504	.534	W5
6 (Note: Minnesota finished ahead of Chicago based on a better divisional record (4–2 to 3–3).)	Minnesota Vikings	North	10	6	0	.625	4–2	7–5	.520	.456	W4
Did not qualify for the postseason
7	Chicago Bears	North	10	6	0	.625	3–3	7–5	.512	.403	W2
8	New York Giants	East	9	7	0	.563	3–3	8–4	.521	.490	W1
9	Dallas Cowboys	East	8	8	0	.500	3–3	5–7	.523	.422	L2
10	St. Louis Rams	West	7	8	1	.469	4–1–1	6–5–1	.539	.496	L1
11 (Note: Carolina and New Orleans finished ahead of Tampa Bay in the NFC South based on record versus common opponents (5–5 to Tampa Bay's 4–6). Carolina finished in second place based on a head-to-head sweep over New Orleans.)	Carolina Panthers	South	7	9	0	.438	3–3	5–7	.516	.464	W4
12 (Note: New Orleans finished in third place in the NFC South based on a head-to-head sweep over Tampa Bay.)	New Orleans Saints	South	7	9	0	.438	3–3	5–7	.521	.446	L1
13	Tampa Bay Buccaneers	South	7	9	0	.438	3–3	4–8	.502	.446	W1
14	Arizona Cardinals	West	5	11	0	.313	1–5	3–9	.559	.475	L2
15 (Note: Detroit finished ahead of Philadelphia based on a head-to-head victory.)	Detroit Lions	North	4	12	0	.250	0–6	3–9	.566	.383	L8
16	Philadelphia Eagles	East	4	12	0	.250	1–5	2–10	.508	.484	L3
Tiebreakers (Note: When breaking ties for three or more teams under the NFL's rules, they are first broken within divisions, then comparing only the highest-ranked remaining team from each division.)

== Postseason ==
Within each conference, the four division winners and the top two non-division winners with the best overall regular season records) qualified for the playoffs. The four division winners are seeded 1–4 based on their overall won-lost-tied record, and the wild card teams are seeded 5–6. The NFL does not use a fixed bracket playoff system, and there are no restrictions regarding teams from the same division matching up in any round. In the first round, dubbed the wild-card playoffs or wild-card weekend, the third-seeded division winner hosts the sixth-seed wild card, and the fourth seed hosts the fifth. The 1 and 2 seeds from each conference received a first-round bye. In the second round, the divisional playoffs, the number 1 seed hosts the worst-surviving seed from the first round (seed 4, 5, or 6), while the number 2 seed will play the other team (seed 3, 4, or 5). The two surviving teams from each conference's divisional playoff games met in the respective AFC and NFC Conference Championship games, hosted by the higher seed. Although the Super Bowl, the championship round of the playoffs, is played at a neutral site, the designated home team is based on an annual rotation by conference.

Playoff seeds
Seed	AFC	NFC
1	Denver Broncos (West winner)	Atlanta Falcons (South winner)
2	New England Patriots (East winner)	San Francisco 49ers (West winner)
3	Houston Texans (South winner)	Green Bay Packers (North winner)
4	Baltimore Ravens (North winner)	Washington Redskins (East winner)
5	Indianapolis Colts (wild card)	Seattle Seahawks (wild card)
6	Cincinnati Bengals (wild card)	Minnesota Vikings (wild card)

=== Playoffs bracket ===
Jan 6 – M&T Bank Stadium	Jan 12 – Sports Authority Field at Mile High
5	Indianapolis	9
4	Baltimore	38**
4	Baltimore	24	Jan 20 – Gillette Stadium
1	Denver	35
AFC
Jan 5 – Reliant Stadium	4	Baltimore	28
Jan 13 – Gillette Stadium
2	New England	13
6	Cincinnati	13	AFC Championship
3	Houston	28
3	Houston	19	Feb 3 – Mercedes-Benz Superdome
2	New England	41
Wild-card round
Divisional round
Jan 5 – Lambeau Field	A4	Baltimore	34
Jan 12 – Candlestick Park
N2	San Francisco	31
6	Minnesota	10	Super Bowl XLVII
3	Green Bay	31
3	Green Bay	24	Jan 20 – Georgia Dome
2	San Francisco	45
NFC
Jan 6 – FedExField	2	San Francisco	28
Jan 13 – Georgia Dome
1	Atlanta	24
5	Seattle	24	NFC Championship
5	Seattle	28
4	Washington	14
1	Atlanta	30

** Indicates 2OT victory

== Controversies ==
=== Saints bounty scandal ===
In 2012, the New Orleans Saints were discovered to have run a "slush fund" under former defensive coordinator Gregg Williams, that paid out bonuses, called "bounties", to purposely injure offensive players that the Saints were playing against. The system was known to have operated during Williams's time in Buffalo and Washington. Rumors started in 2009 during the Saints Super Bowl XLIV run in the 2009 NFC Championship game against the Vikings, where the Saints defense was allegedly trying to hurt Vikings quarterback Brett Favre. Other than the Vikings, the Saints also allegedly targeted Chicago Bears and Carolina Panthers players, and the program became even more notorious in the 2011 NFL Divisional Playoff Game against the San Francisco 49ers, when filmmaker Sean Pamphilon released audio tapes of Williams telling his players to injure a select group of 49ers, with one of them being running back Kendall Hunter, and to knock him out, as well as going after Kyle Williams because of his history of concussions. Williams also told them to injure Vernon Davis' ankles and tear wide receiver Michael Crabtree's ACL. According to Pamphilon, Williams also appeared to put a bounty on quarterback Alex Smith after he told his men to hit Smith in the chin, "then he rubs his thumb against his index and middle fingers – the cash sign – and says, I got the first one. I got the first one. Go get it. Go lay that [expletive] out."

Ultimately, Goodell handed down one of the harshest penalties in league history, by suspending Williams indefinitely, head coach Sean Payton for the entire 2012 season, interim head coach Joe Vitt for the first 6 games, and general manager Mickey Loomis for 8 games. Saints linebacker Jonathan Vilma was also suspended for the season, as well as defensive linemen Anthony Hargrove and Will Smith for 8 and 4 games, respectively. Former Saints and current Cleveland Browns linebacker Scott Fujita was also suspended for 3 games. The player's suspensions were later thrown out on appeal.

=== Chargers Stickum ===
During the Monday Night Football game on October 15 between the San Diego Chargers and the Denver Broncos, officials checked the hands of Chargers players, under the suspicion that players were using Stickum or a similar banned adhesive on players' towels to gain a competitive edge. Chargers' head coach Norv Turner strenuously denied the accusations. The towels were revealed to have Gorilla Gold Grip Enhancer. The Chargers were fined $20,000 by the NFL for failing to immediately surrender team towels when requested, but were cleared of illegal substance use. Gorilla Gold was subsequently banned from use by the NFL.

== League averages ==
There were a total of 11,651 points scored during the 2012 NFL regular season. The average points scored among all the teams in the NFL was 22.8 points per game.

The New England Patriots had the highest point differential, scoring an average of 14.1 points more than their opponents. The Kansas City Chiefs had the lowest point differential scoring an average of 13.4 points less than their opponents.

== Records ==
- Jason Hanson set the record for most consecutive seasons with one team. He has been the kicker for the Detroit Lions for 21 seasons.
- Ed Reed of the Baltimore Ravens broke Rod Woodson's record for interception return yardage in a week one game against the Cincinnati Bengals. He is now the all-time leader in interception return yards with 1,541.
- Robert Griffin III became the only player in NFL history to pass for 300+ yards and 2 touchdowns without throwing an interception in his first start.
- David Akers tied the NFL record for longest field goal (63 yards).
- Peyton Manning joined Dan Marino and Brett Favre as the only players to throw at least 400 touchdowns.
- Week 1 set a record for being the highest scoring opening week in NFL history. The new record of 791 points is 3 points higher than the 2002 record. Five teams scored more than 40 points, also the most in NFL history.
- NFL sets record with 20 teams at 1–1.
- Drew Brees' record streak of consecutive games with 300 plus yards passing ended at 9 games in a week 3 loss to the Kansas City Chiefs. His streak began in week 10 of the 2011 season.
- Danny Amendola of the St. Louis Rams had 12 receptions in the first half of the week two game vs. Washington to tie the NFL record for most receptions in the first half set by the Indianapolis Colts' Reggie Wayne in 2007.
- The Tennessee Titans scored a record five touchdowns of 60-plus yards in one game (1 punt return, 2 pass plays, 1 kickoff return, 1 fumble return) against the Detroit Lions in week 3.
- The week 3 game between the New England Patriots and Baltimore Ravens produced an NFL record 13 first downs via penalties. Of the 13, New England was awarded 8 and Baltimore 5.
- In week 4, Rams rookie kicker Greg Zuerlein became the first player in league history to make kicks from 50-plus and 60-plus yards in the same game.
- Drew Brees' record of 48 consecutive games with a touchdown pass in week 5 vs. San Diego (the first team Brees played for) broke Johnny Unitas' record that had stood since 1960. The streak ended at 54 games in week thirteen against the Atlanta Falcons.
- Charles Tillman and Lance Briggs set a new record by intercepting a pass for a touchdown in both Week 4 and Week 5. They became the first pair of teammates in NFL history to each return an interception for a touchdown in consecutive games.
- In week five the San Francisco 49ers became the first team in NFL history with 300 yards passing and 300 yards rushing vs. the Buffalo Bills.
- Chris Johnson of the Tennessee Titans ran for an 83-yard touchdown in the first quarter of the Titans' win over the Buffalo Bills to become the first player in NFL history with four 80-plus yard touchdown runs in a career.
- The Kansas City Chiefs set a record of seven consecutive games without holding a lead, previously set by the 1929 Buffalo Bisons.
- Week 8: New England gained over 350 yards of total offense for the 17th straight game, breaking an NFL record set by the Rams in 1999–2000.
- By allowing 530 yards by the Broncos in week eight, the New Orleans Saints became the first team to allow 400-plus yards in seven games in a row since 1950, which is as far back as STATS LLC can search its NFL database. Record ended at ten games through week 11.
- In week 8, Jason Witten of the Cowboys caught 18 passes against the Giants. This set a new NFL record for catches in a game by a tight end, and was the third most in a single game by any player in NFL history.
- Through week eight Peyton Manning has increased his record of most regular season games with 300 plus yards passing to 68 games.
- Andrew Luck broke the NFL's single-game rookie record when he threw for 433 yards to lead the Indianapolis Colts past the Miami Dolphins.
- Chicago became the first team in NFL history to record a touchdown pass, a touchdown run, an interception return for a touchdown, and a blocked kick/punt for a score in the same quarter in their week 9 game against the Tennessee Titans.
- Charles Tillman became the first player in the NFL to force four fumbles in one game since the stat became tracked in 1991.
- Doug Martin became the first player in league history to record touchdown runs of 70-plus, 65-plus, and 45-plus yards in a single game. He joined Denver's Mike Anderson as the only players in league history with at least 250 rushing yards and four touchdowns in a game.
- Jacoby Jones of the Ravens became the first player in league history with two career kickoff returns of at least 105 yards. He returned one for 108 yards against Dallas; he followed it up a few weeks later when he returned one for 105 yards against Oakland, simultaneously tying the record for longest kickoff return on the former return.
- Andrew Luck set the rookie record with six games of at least 300 yards passing.
- Leon Washington of the Seahawks returned a kickoff for a touchdown for the eighth time to tie the NFL career record.
- Calvin Johnson of the Lions broke the NFL season receiving yards record against the Falcons on December 22.
- Blair Walsh broke the NFL single season record for most field goals made in a season of over 50 yards on December 23 against the Texans.
- Placekicker Kai Forbath of the Redskins set a new NFL record with 17 consecutive field goals to start a career.
- Andrew Luck broke the rookie record for passing yards in a season on December 23.
- Jason Witten broke the NFL single season record for catches by a tight end on December 23.
- Adrian Peterson became the seventh player in NFL history to rush for 2,000 yards in a single season by rushing for 199 yards in Week 17, bringing his season total to 2,097 rushing yards. This also brings him just nine yards short of breaking Eric Dickerson's record set in 1984 and gives him the all-time second best single season record for rushing yards.
- Russell Wilson tied Peyton Manning's rookie record for touchdown passes in a single season with 26.
- The New England Patriots gained an NFL record 444 first downs.
- The 2012 regular season set the NFL record for total points scored in a season with 11,651; the 22.8 points-per-game for each team is also the highest since the AFL-NFL merger.
- The Minnesota Vikings set the NFL record for most playoff losses with 27.
- The Minnesota Vikings broke the NFL record for most road playoff losses with 16.
- The New England Patriots tied the St. Louis Rams' record set from 1999 to 2001 for the most consecutive seasons scoring 500 or more points with three.
- Robert Griffin III set a passer rating of 102.4, to break Ben Roethlisberger's record for the highest rating by a rookie.
- Most home playoff games won: 20, San Francisco 49ers
- Colin Kaepernick set record for most rushing yards by a quarterback in a single game, with 181 yards.
- Tom Brady set the record for most playoff games won with 17.
- Most conference championship games played starting quarterback (tie): 7, Tom Brady
- Russell Wilson set a rookie record for passing yards in a playoff game : 385.
- Joe Flacco tied Joe Montana's record for most touchdown passes (11) without an interception in a postseason

== Regular season statistical leaders ==
Individual
Scoring leader	Stephen Gostkowski, New England (153)
Most field goals made	Blair Walsh, Minnesota (35 FGs)
Touchdowns	Arian Foster, Houston (17 TDs)
Rushing	Adrian Peterson, Minnesota (2,097 yards)
Passing yards	Drew Brees, New Orleans (5,177 yards)
Passing touchdowns	Drew Brees, New Orleans (43 TDs)
Passer rating	Aaron Rodgers, Green Bay (108.0 rating)
Pass receptions	Calvin Johnson, Detroit (122 catches)
Pass receiving yards	Calvin Johnson, Detroit (1,964 yards)
Combined tackles	Luke Kuechly, Carolina (165 tackles)
Interceptions	Tim Jennings, Chicago (9)
Punting	Dave Zastudil, Arizona (4,783 yards, 47.2 average yards)
Sacks	J. J. Watt, Houston (20.5)

== Awards ==
=== All-Pro Team ===
Offense
Quarterback	Peyton Manning (Denver)
Running back	Adrian Peterson (Minnesota); Marshawn Lynch (Seattle)
Fullback	Vonta Leach (Baltimore)
Wide receiver	Calvin Johnson (Detroit); Brandon Marshall (Chicago)
Tight end	Tony Gonzalez (Atlanta)
Offensive tackle	Duane Brown (Houston); Ryan Clady (Denver)
Offensive guard	Mike Iupati (San Francisco); Jahri Evans (New Orleans)
Center	Max Unger (Seattle)

Defense
Defensive end	J. J. Watt (Houston); Cameron Wake (Miami)
Defensive tackle	Geno Atkins (Cincinnati); Vince Wilfork (New England)
Outside linebacker	Von Miller (Denver); Aldon Smith (San Francisco)
Inside linebacker	Patrick Willis (San Francisco); NaVorro Bowman (San Francisco)
Cornerback	Richard Sherman (Seattle); Charles Tillman (Chicago)
Safety	Earl Thomas (Seattle); Dashon Goldson (San Francisco)

Special teams
Kicker	Blair Walsh (Minnesota)
Punter	Andy Lee (San Francisco)
Kick returner	Jacoby Jones (Baltimore)

=== Players of the Week/Month ===
The following were named the top performers during the 2012 season:

Week/ Month	Offensive Player of the Week/Month		Defensive Player of the Week/Month		Special Teams Player of the Week/Month	
Week/ Month	AFC	NFC	AFC	NFC	AFC	NFC
1	Joe Flacco (Ravens)	Robert Griffin III (Redskins)	Tracy Porter (Broncos)	Ronde Barber (Buccaneers)	Jeremy Kerley (Jets)	Blair Walsh (Vikings)
2	Reggie Bush (Dolphins)	Hakeem Nicks (Giants)	J. J. Watt (Texans)	Calais Campbell (Cardinals)	Adam Jones (Bengals)	Tim Masthay (Packers)
3	Jamaal Charles (Chiefs)	Larry Fitzgerald (Cardinals)	Michael Johnson (Bengals)	Chris Clemons (Seahawks)	Darius Reynaud (Titans)	Lawrence Tynes (Giants)
4	Tom Brady (Patriots)	Aaron Rodgers (Packers)	Donald Butler (Chargers)	Patrick Willis (49ers)	Matt Prater (Broncos)	Greg Zuerlein (Rams)
Sept.	A. J. Green (Bengals)	Matt Ryan (Falcons)	J. J. Watt (Texans)	Tim Jennings (Bears)	Darius Reynaud (Titans)	Percy Harvin (Vikings)
5	Reggie Wayne (Colts)	Drew Brees (Saints)	Randy Starks (Dolphins)	Charles Tillman (Bears)	Shaun Suisham (Steelers)	John Hekker (Rams)
6	Peyton Manning (Broncos)	Aaron Rodgers (Packers)	Jairus Byrd (Bills)	Antrel Rolle (Giants)	Jacoby Jones (Ravens)	Jason Hanson (Lions)
7	Chris Johnson (Titans)	Adrian Peterson (Vikings)	Lamarr Houston (Raiders)	Charles Tillman (Bears)	Devin McCourty (Patriots)	Andy Lee (49ers)
8	Tom Brady (Patriots)	Alex Smith (49ers)	Wesley Woodyard (Broncos)	Stevie Brown (Giants)	Olivier Vernon (Dolphins)	Davon House (Packers)
Oct.	Peyton Manning (Broncos)	Aaron Rodgers (Packers)	Cameron Wake (Dolphins)	Charles Tillman (Bears)	Sebastian Janikowski (Raiders)	Lawrence Tynes (Giants)
9	Andrew Luck (Colts)	Doug Martin (Buccaneers)	Ike Taylor (Steelers)	Brian Urlacher (Bears)	Trindon Holliday (Broncos)	Sherrick McManis (Bears)
10	Andy Dalton (Bengals)	Jimmy Graham (Saints)	Darius Butler (Colts)	Richard Sherman (Seahawks)	Jacoby Jones (Ravens)	Dwayne Harris (Cowboys)
11	Matt Schaub (Texans)	Robert Griffin III (Redskins)	Von Miller (Broncos)	Aldon Smith (49ers)	Leodis McKelvin (Bills)	Dan Bailey (Cowboys)
12	Ray Rice (Ravens)	Cam Newton (Panthers)	D'Qwell Jackson (Browns)	Janoris Jenkins (Rams)	T. Y. Hilton (Colts)	Leon Washington (Seahawks)
Nov.	Andre Johnson (Texans)	Calvin Johnson (Lions)	Von Miller (Broncos)	Aldon Smith (49ers)	Jacoby Jones (Ravens)	Dekoda Watson (Buccaneers)
13	Brady Quinn (Chiefs)	Russell Wilson (Seahawks)	Carlos Dunlap (Bengals)	William Moore (Falcons)	Shaun Suisham (Steelers)	Greg Zuerlein (Rams)
14	Tom Brady (Patriots)	Adrian Peterson (Vikings)	Cassius Vaughn (Colts)	Luke Kuechly (Panthers)	Travis Benjamin (Browns)	David Wilson (Giants)
15	Knowshon Moreno (Broncos)	Colin Kaepernick (49ers)	J. J. Watt (Texans)	Brandon Carr (Cowboys)	Sebastian Janikowski (Raiders)	Blair Walsh (Vikings)
16	Ray Rice (Ravens)	Matt Ryan (Falcons)	Geno Atkins (Bengals)	Julius Peppers (Bears)	Micheal Spurlock (Chargers)	Red Bryant (Seahawks)
17	Peyton Manning (Broncos)	Alfred Morris (Redskins)	Vontae Davis (Colts)	Stevie Brown (Giants)	Darius Reynaud (Titans)	Blair Walsh (Vikings)
Dec.	Peyton Manning (Broncos)	Adrian Peterson (Vikings)	J. J. Watt (Texans)	London Fletcher (Redskins)	Josh Brown (Bengals)	Blair Walsh (Vikings)

Week	FedEx Air Player of the Week (Quarterbacks)	FedEx Ground Player of the Week (Running Backs)	Pepsi Max Rookie of the Week
1	Robert Griffin III (Redskins)	C. J. Spiller (Bills)	Robert Griffin III (Redskins)
2	Eli Manning (Giants)	Reggie Bush (Dolphins)	Trent Richardson (Browns)
3	Joe Flacco (Ravens)	Jamaal Charles (Chiefs)	Andrew Luck (Colts)
4	Tom Brady (Patriots)	Brandon Bolden (Patriots)	Robert Griffin III (Redskins)
5	Alex Smith (49ers)	Ahmad Bradshaw (Giants)	Andrew Luck (Colts)
6	Aaron Rodgers (Packers)	Shonn Greene (Jets)	Robert Griffin III (Redskins)
7	Drew Brees (Saints)	Chris Johnson (Titans)	Alfred Morris (Redskins)
8	Tom Brady (Patriots)	Doug Martin (Buccaneers)	Andrew Luck (Colts)
9	Andrew Luck (Colts)	Doug Martin (Buccaneers)	Doug Martin (Buccaneers)
10	Joe Flacco (Ravens)	Adrian Peterson (Vikings)	Russell Wilson (Seahawks)
11	Matt Schaub (Texans)	Doug Martin (Buccaneers)	Robert Griffin III (Redskins)
12	Robert Griffin III (Redskins)	Arian Foster (Texans)	Robert Griffin III (Redskins)
13	Russell Wilson (Seahawks)	Adrian Peterson (Vikings)	Robert Griffin III (Redskins)
14	Tom Brady (Patriots)	Adrian Peterson (Vikings)	Alfred Morris (Redskins)
15	Matt Ryan (Falcons)	Knowshon Moreno (Broncos)	Kirk Cousins (Redskins)
16	Aaron Rodgers (Packers)	Jamaal Charles (Chiefs)	Robert Griffin III (Redskins)
17	Peyton Manning (Broncos)	Alfred Morris (Redskins)	Alfred Morris (Redskins)

Month	Rookie of the Month	
Month	Offensive	Defensive
Sept.	Robert Griffin III (Redskins)	Chandler Jones (Patriots)
Oct.	Doug Martin (Buccaneers)	Casey Hayward (Packers)
Nov.	Robert Griffin III (Redskins)	Lavonte David (Buccaneers)
Dec.	Russell Wilson (Seahawks)	Luke Kuechly (Panthers)

=== Season awards ===
The 2nd NFL Honors, saluting the best players and plays from 2012 season, was held at the Mahalia Jackson Theater in New Orleans, Louisiana on February 2, 2013.

Award	Winner	Position	Team
AP Most Valuable Player	Adrian Peterson	Running back	Minnesota Vikings
AP Offensive Player of the Year	Adrian Peterson	Running back	Minnesota Vikings
AP Defensive Player of the Year	J. J. Watt	Defensive end	Houston Texans
AP Coach of the Year	Bruce Arians	Head coach	Indianapolis Colts
AP Offensive Rookie of the Year	Robert Griffin III	Quarterback	Washington Redskins
AP Defensive Rookie of the Year	Luke Kuechly	Linebacker	Carolina Panthers
AP Comeback Player of the Year	Peyton Manning	Quarterback	Denver Broncos
Pepsi Rookie of the Year	Russell Wilson	Quarterback	Seattle Seahawks
Walter Payton NFL Man of the Year	Jason Witten	Tight end	Dallas Cowboys
PFWA NFL Executive of the Year	Ryan Grigson	General manager	Indianapolis Colts
Super Bowl Most Valuable Player	Joe Flacco	Quarterback	Baltimore Ravens

=== Team superlatives ===
==== Offense ====
- Most points scored: New England, 557 (34.8 PPG)
- Fewest points scored: Kansas City, 211 (13.2 PPG)
- Most total offensive yards: New England, 6,846
- Fewest total offensive yards: Arizona, 4,209
- Most total passing yards: New Orleans, 4,997
- Fewest total passing yards: Kansas City, 2,713
- Most rushing yards: Washington, 2,709
- Fewest rushing yards: Arizona, 1,204

==== Defense ====
- Fewest points allowed: Seattle, 245 (15.3 PPG)
- Most points allowed: Tennessee, 471 (29.4 PPG)
- Fewest total yards allowed (defense): Pittsburgh, 4,413
- Most total yards allowed (defense): New Orleans, 7,042
- Fewest passing yards allowed: Pittsburgh, 2,963
- Most passing yards allowed (defense): Tampa Bay, 4,758
- Fewest rushing yards allowed (defense): Tampa Bay, 1,320
- Most rushing yards allowed (defense): New Orleans, 2,361

== Head coach/front office changes ==
=== Head coach ===
Pre-season changes

Team:	2011 head coach: at start of season	2011 interim head coach:	2012 replacement:	Reason for leaving:	Notes
Jacksonville Jaguars	Jack Del Rio	Mel Tucker	Mike Mularkey	Fired	Del Rio was fired after compiling a 69–73 (.486) record (including postseason games) in 8¾ seasons as head coach; the team has not made the playoffs since 2007. Del Rio was fired at the same time that Wayne Weaver, the owner of the Jaguars, announced his intentions to sell the team to Pakistani-American automotive parts builder Shahid Khan. Del Rio later became defensive coordinator of the Denver Broncos. Mularkey, previously the head coach of the Buffalo Bills from 2004 to 2005, had most recently been offensive coordinator for the Atlanta Falcons. Tucker remains on the Jaguars staff.
Kansas City Chiefs	Todd Haley	Romeo Crennel		Fired	Haley compiled a 19–27 (.413) record, including one postseason loss, in nearly 3 seasons with the Chiefs. Team ownership cited inconsistent play and a lack of progress in their decision; Haley was also cited for an unsportsmanlike conduct penalty in what turned out to be his final game. In 2012, he became offensive coordinator for the Pittsburgh Steelers. Crennel was the defensive coordinator for the Chiefs when he was promoted, and had previously served as head coach of the Cleveland Browns from 2005 to 2008.
Miami Dolphins	Tony Sparano	Todd Bowles	Joe Philbin	Fired	Sparano compiled a 29–33 (.468) record, including one postseason loss, in nearly 4 seasons with the Dolphins. Ongoing speculation regarding Sparano's future in Miami prompted Dolphins owner Stephen Ross to dismiss Sparano prior to the end of the season instead of letting the speculation become a further distraction. Sparano then became offensive coordinator of the New York Jets; Bowles joined the staff of the Philadelphia Eagles. The Dolphins intended on hiring someone from outside the organization in the 2012 offseason and followed through on that intent by hiring Philbin, the former offensive coordinator of the Green Bay Packers.
St. Louis Rams	Steve Spagnuolo		Jeff Fisher	Fired	Spagnuolo compiled a 10–38 (.213) record in three seasons as head coach of the Rams, including a 1–15 record in 2009 and a 2–14 record in 2011. He and general manager Billy Devaney were dismissed concurrently on January 2. Spagnuolo joined the staff of the New Orleans Saints as defensive coordinator. Fisher, who had spent the previous season out of football, had coached the Houston Oilers/Tennessee Titans franchise from 1994 to 2010.
Tampa Bay Buccaneers	Raheem Morris		Greg Schiano	Fired	Morris compiled a 17–31 (.354) record in three seasons as head coach of the Buccaneers and ended the 2011 season with a ten-game losing streak. He subsequently became defensive backs coach for the Washington Redskins. Schiano had spent the previous 11 seasons in college football, as head coach of the Rutgers Scarlet Knights football team, a team he eventually returned to as head coach 8 years later.
Oakland Raiders	Hue Jackson		Dennis Allen	Fired	Jackson compiled an 8–8 (.500) record in his lone season as the Raiders' head coach, but set a league record for penalties. After the death of longtime owner Al Davis, the Raiders hired a new general manager Reggie McKenzie, who then decided to hire his own coaching staff. Subsequently, Jackson was dismissed from the team. As of 2012, Jackson serves as an assistant with the Cincinnati Bengals. Allen had previously served as the defensive coordinator of the Denver Broncos.
Indianapolis Colts	Jim Caldwell		Chuck Pagano	Fired	Caldwell was fired after compiling a 28–24 (.538) record (including postseason games) in three seasons as head coach; the team suffered through a 2–14 record in 2011, in which quarterback Peyton Manning sat out the whole season while recovering from multiple neck surgeries. This record was the worst in the league and brought Caldwell's firing as well as that of 15-year general manager Bill Polian, and virtually every skill position player on the offensive side of the ball (including every quarterback on the roster). Caldwell then joined the Baltimore Ravens as quarterbacks coach. Pagano had previously served as the defensive coordinator of the Ravens.
New Orleans Saints	Sean Payton		Joe Vitt, Aaron Kromer	Suspended	Payton was suspended on March 21, 2012 for the 2012 season (starting April 1 and concluding with Super Bowl XLVII) for his role in the New Orleans Saints bounty scandal, in which players would be rewarded under the table for injury-causing hits. Vitt and general manager Mickey Loomis were also suspended, for six and eight games respectively, and Gregg Williams, the defensive coordinator at the time who allegedly oversaw the bounties, was banned indefinitely from the league (at the time of the ban Williams was the defensive coordinator of the St. Louis Rams). Vitt served as head coach through training camp and the preseason, at which point he began serving his six-game suspension and Kromer (the team's offensive line coach) took over as interim coach until Vitt's suspension ended.

In-season

The following head coaches were replaced in-season:

Team:	2012 head coach:	Interim head coach:	Reason for leaving:	Notes
Indianapolis Colts	Chuck Pagano	Bruce Arians	Medical leave	Pagano was diagnosed with leukemia four weeks into the regular season, forcing him to take an indefinite medical leave of absence, while Arians, the Colts' offensive coordinator, took his place. Pagano returned to the team in Week 17 and coached the Colts in their playoff game vs. the Ravens.

=== Front office ===
Offseason

Team	Position	2011 office holder at start of season	Interim office holder	Reason for leaving	2012 replacement	Notes
Chicago Bears	GM	Jerry Angelo		Fired	Phil Emery	Angelo was fired by the Bears on January 3, 2012. The reason for his firing was due to a combination of poor drafting and questionable free agent signings, with the team stating they wanted to "close a talent gap" to stay competitive with the rival Green Bay Packers and Detroit Lions in the NFC North. He left with a 95-81 record as the Bears' general manager. After his hiring on January 26, 2012, Bears chairman George McCaskey told Emery that though head coach Lovie Smith's contract ran through 2013, and that Smith would be head coach in 2012, Emery would have the ability to make a change at the position after the end of the 2012 season.
Denver Broncos	GM	John Elway/Brian Xanders		Xanders fired	John Elway	The Broncos parted ways with Xanders on May 7, 2012. Elway was named general manager and executive vice president of football operations of the Broncos on January 5, 2011, with the final say in all football matters. Xanders, who had been the Broncos' general manager for the past two seasons, was initially retained to serve in an advisory role to Elway. With Xanders' firing, Elway fully assumes the role of general manager, giving him complete control over the Broncos' football operations.
Indianapolis Colts	GM	Chris Polian		Fired	Ryan Grigson	The team suffered through a 2–14 record in 2011, in which quarterback Peyton Manning sat out the whole season while recovering from multiple neck surgeries. This record was the worst in the league and brought the firing of general manager Chris Polian as well as that of his father, long-time general manager and team president Bill Polian, head coach Jim Caldwell, and virtually every skill position player on the offensive side of the ball (including every quarterback on the roster).
Oakland Raiders	GM	Al Davis	Hue Jackson (de facto)	Replaced, then Fired	Reggie McKenzie	McKenzie was hired as general manager of the Oakland Raiders on January 5, 2012, replacing then-head coach Hue Jackson, who had gained control following the death of longtime owner Al Davis on October 8, 2011, at the age of 82. Former Raiders coach John Madden recommended McKenzie to new acting owner Mark Davis, who hired McKenzie after an interview conducted jointly by Davis and Madden. Jackson was fired by McKenzie five days later.
Philadelphia Eagles	President	Joe Banner		Replaced	Don Smolenski	Smolenski was promoted to team president on June 7, 2012, replacing Joe Banner, who moved into a new role as strategic advisor to owner Jeffrey Lurie.
San Francisco 49ers	President	Jed York		Replaced	Gideon Yu	49ers principal owner and CEO Jed York hired former YouTube and Facebook Chief Financial Officer Gideon Yu to replace him in his role as team president on Feb 10, 2012.
St. Louis Rams	GM	Billy Devaney		Fired	Les Snead	Devaney was fired at the end of the 2011 season after a 10–38 record as GM. The Rams announced the hiring of Atlanta Falcons director of player personnel Les Snead on February 10, 2012.
Tennessee Titans	GM	Mike Reinfeldt		Promoted	Ruston Webster	Reinfeldt was promoted to senior executive vice president and chief operating officer, and vice president of player personnel Ruston Webster was then promoted to GM.

In-season

Team	Position	Departing office holder	Reason for leaving	Interim replacement	Notes
Carolina Panthers	GM	Marty Hurney	Fired	Brandon Beane	Hurney was fired as general manager on October 22nd, 2012, after the team started 1–5. Director of football operations Brandon Beane served as GM in an interim capacity following Hurney's dismissal.
Cleveland Browns	President	Mike Holmgren	Fired	Joe Banner	On October 16, 2012, new Browns owner Jimmy Haslam announced that Holmgren would leave the team at the end of the 2012 season.

== Uniforms ==
- Nike became the official uniform provider for the NFL, succeeding Reebok, which had a decade-long partnership in that capacity. On April 3, Nike unveiled the new uniforms for all 32 teams. Cosmetically, the new jerseys did not show drastic differences save for the aforementioned changes to the Seattle Seahawks' uniforms.
- The Carolina Panthers unveiled an updated logo and word mark in late January 2012, though it has been reported that the actual uniforms will not be altered at the present time.
- The Denver Broncos switched their primary home jersey color from navy blue to orange. The orange jerseys that served as the team's alternate colored jersey from 2002 to 2011 became the primary home jersey, while the navy blue jerseys that served as the team's primary home jersey from 1997 to 2011 switched to the alternate designation. The change was made due to overwhelming popularity with fans, who clamored for the team to return to wearing orange at home, which was the team's predominant home jersey color from 1962 to 1996.
- The Houston Texans celebrated 10 years as a franchise by wearing an anniversary patch throughout the season.
- The Jacksonville Jaguars switched their primary home jersey color from teal to black, beginning with their Week 5 (October 7, 2012) game against the Chicago Bears.
- The Kansas City Chiefs debuted captains' patches to their uniforms for the first time in the Week 10 (November 12, 2012) game against Pittsburgh. The patches would remain through the rest of the season but were removed in 2013.
- The Pittsburgh Steelers unveiled a new throwback uniform in April 2012, which was worn in games against the Washington Redskins and the Baltimore Ravens. The uniforms, based on the 1934 Pittsburgh Pirates (the predecessors to the Steelers), feature broad black and Aztec gold horizontal stripes across the jerseys and socks, reminiscent of bumblebees and prison uniforms.
- The Seattle Seahawks replaced Seahawk blue with College Navy as the color of their primary uniforms. Their new uniforms consist of a navy blue jersey as their primary home jersey, a white jersey as their primary away jersey, and a wolf grey jersey as an alternate. The Seahawks have three pairs of pants: navy blue with action green feather trim, white with navy blue feather trim, and wolf grey with navy blue feather trim. Each pair of pants, as well as the collar of the jerseys, feature 12 feathers, in honor of the fans, who refer to themselves as the '12th Man'. The Seahawks also tweaked their logo, by changing the lower left stripe from light blue to grey.
- The Washington Redskins wore throwback uniforms to celebrate their 80th anniversary in their game against the Panthers.
- The Baltimore Ravens dedicated their season to former owner and founder Art Modell, who died on September 6, 2012. On Week 1, all team members wore an "Art" decal on their helmets, and for the rest of their season, they wore an "Art" patch on the left side of their jerseys.
- During the 2012 Pro Bowl, Nike debuted new team color specific cleats and new team specific Vapor Jet gloves. Similar to gloves worn at the collegiate level, the Vapor Jet gloves feature individual team colors and team logos on the glove palms.
- The Carolina Panthers' new jersey has the phrase "KEEP POUNDING" inside the collar which commemorates former Panther Sam Mills' battle with cancer.
- Nike's new jerseys also introduced what the company calls a "body-contoured fit". However, several players, primarily heavier players such as offensive linemen, reported that the new, tighter-fitting uniforms made them "look fat".
- Introduced in Week 5 after the end of the referee lockout, the new referee uniform used the NFL's "Orbit" font that the league uses in its branding and marketing.
- During Weeks 14 and 15, all teams wore a commemorative patch celebrating the 50th anniversary of the Pro Football Hall of Fame.

== Media changes ==
This was the seventh season under the television contracts with the league's television partners. On December 14, 2011, the NFL announced that it had extended all of its broadcasting contracts through 2022. There were some changes to the contracts, with the most immediate change in 2012 being the Thanksgiving night game being promoted from NFL Network's Thursday Night Football package to NBC's Sunday Night Football package. CBS continued to primarily televise AFC afternoon away games, Fox airing NFC afternoon away games, and ESPN broadcasting Monday Night Football games.

ESPN made a cut to its Monday Night Football broadcasts, removing Ron Jaworski from the broadcast booth and moving to a two-man announcing crew; Mike Tirico will continue on play-by-play while Jon Gruden continues as the sole color commentator. One year prior, the network had switched from two sideline reporters to one.

The 2013 Pro Bowl was televised by NBC; although the game was normally assigned to the Super Bowl's broadcaster, CBS declined.

The NFL authorized a new rule loosening the league's blackout restrictions during the 2012 offseason. For the first time in NFL history, the new rule no longer requires a stadium to be sold out to televise a game; instead, teams were allowed to set a benchmark anywhere from 85 to 100 percent of the stadium's non-premium seats. Any seats sold beyond that benchmark will be subject to heavier revenue sharing. Four clubs opted to set the lower TV threshold: the Miami Dolphins, the Minnesota Vikings, the Oakland Raiders, and the Tampa Bay Buccaneers. At least four other teams expressly refused to lower their threshold; one case, that of the Buffalo Bills, was particularly controversial, as Buffalo congressman Brian Higgins had lobbied for the loosening of the blackout restrictions only for the Bills to rebuff his efforts, saying such a move would threaten the team's revenue.
