= 2009 Philadelphia Eagles season =

77th season in franchise history; final one with Donovan McNabb

- Owner: Jeffrey Lurie
- Head coach: Andy Reid
- Offensive coordinator: Marty Mornhinweg
- Defensive coordinator: Sean McDermott
- Home stadium: Lincoln Financial Field

Results
- Record: 11–5
- Division place: 2nd NFC East
- Playoffs: Lost Wild Card Playoffs (at Cowboys) 14–34
- All-Pros: David Akers (1st team); Leonard Weaver (1st team); Trent Cole (2nd team); Asante Samuel (2nd team); DeSean Jackson (2nd team)
- Pro Bowlers: QB Donovan McNabb; WR/KR DeSean Jackson; FB Leonard Weaver; OT Jason Peters; DE Trent Cole; CB Asante Samuel; PK David Akers; S Quintin Mikell; LS Jon Dorenbos

The 2009 Philadelphia Eagles season was the franchise's 77th season in the National Football League (NFL), and the eleventh under head coach Andy Reid. After advancing to their fifth NFC Championship game in eight years, the Eagles improved upon their 9–6–1 record and a second-place finish in the NFC East in their 2008 campaign.

The season also marked the end of the Donovan McNabb era in Philadelphia as he was traded to the rival Washington Redskins in the 2010 off-season.

== Players ==
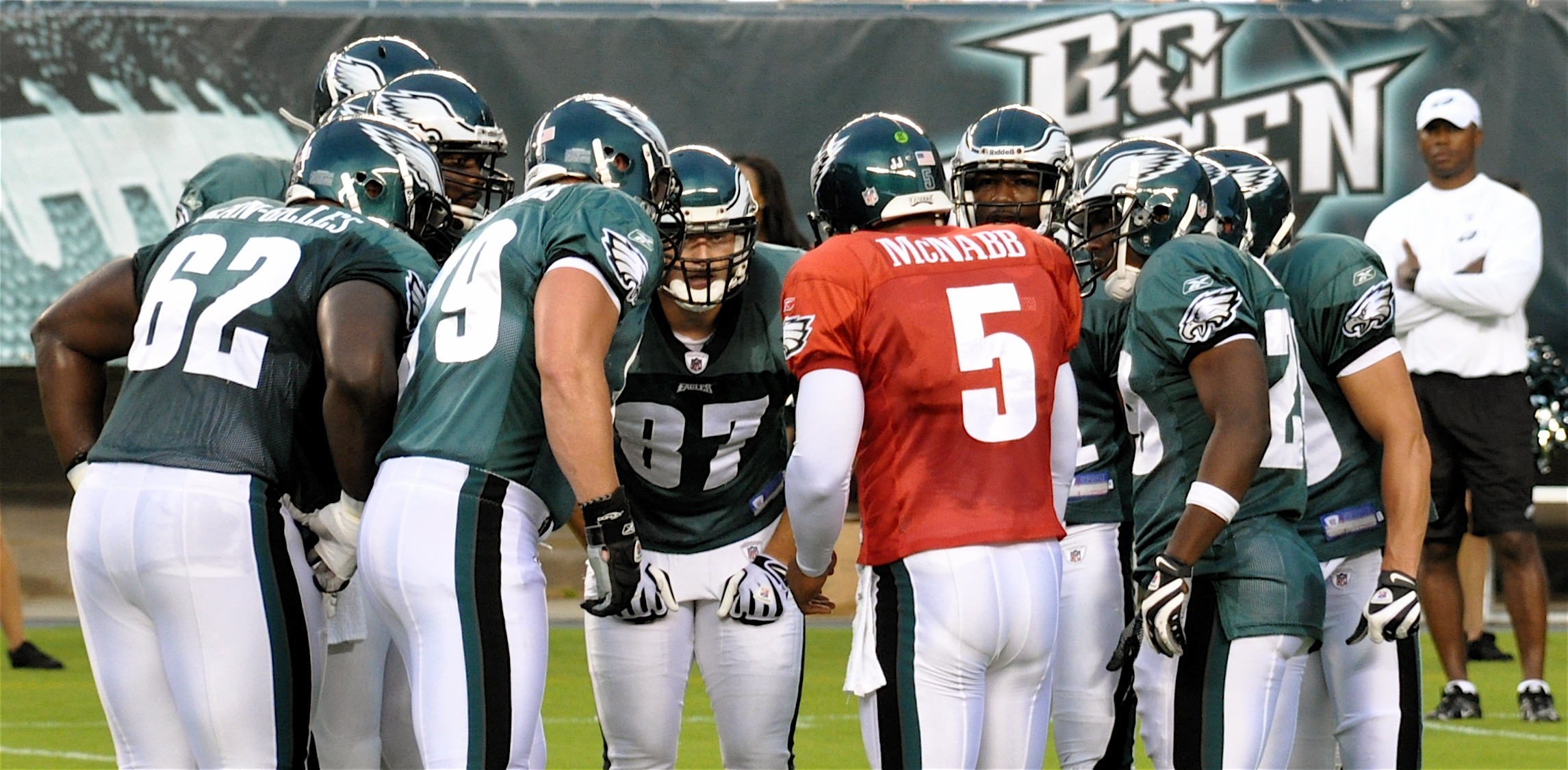
Donovan McNabb and Eagles offense huddle during training camp

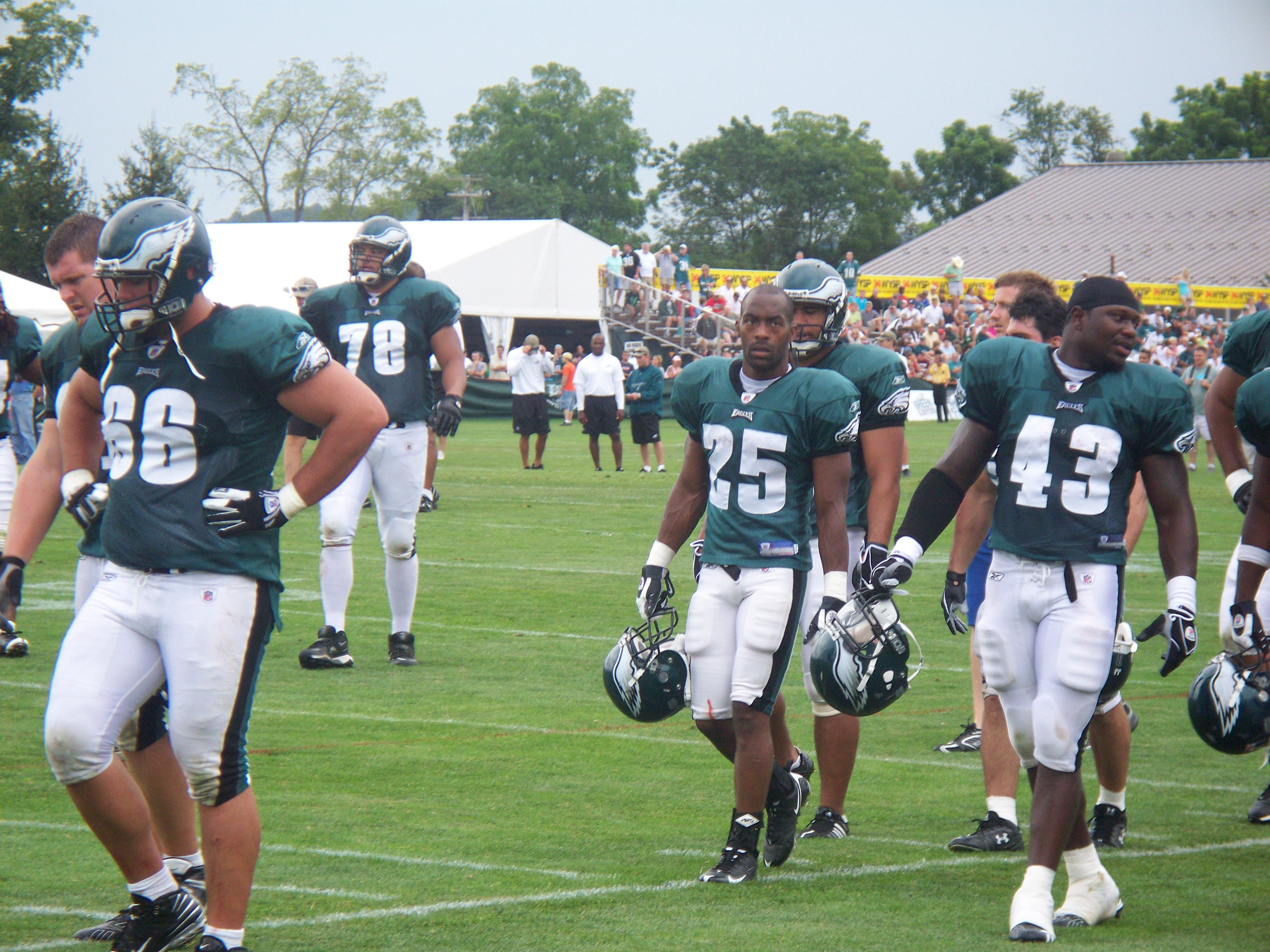
Eagles offensive linemen at training camp, August 2009

=== Movement ===
==== Notable roster additions ====
- OT Stacy Andrews – Signed as a free agent from the Bengals.
- FB Leonard Weaver – Signed as a free agent from the Seahawks (ended up in 2010 Pro Bowl).
- OT Jason Peters – Traded from the Bills for 2009 1st round draft pick, 2009 4th round draft pick, and a conditional 2010 draft pick.
- CB Ellis Hobbs- Traded from the Patriots for two 2009 5th round draft picks (ended up in 2010 Pro Bowl).
- S Sean Jones – Signed as a free agent from the Browns.
- QB Michael Vick – Signed as a free agent after being released by the Atlanta Falcons.

==== Notable roster losses ====
- FS Brian Dawkins – Signed with Denver Broncos as a Free Agent.
- RB Correll Buckhalter – Signed with Denver Broncos as a Free Agent.
- OT Tra Thomas – Signed with Jacksonville Jaguars as a Free Agent.
- TE L.J. Smith – Signed with Baltimore Ravens as a Free Agent.
- SS Sean Considine – Signed with Jacksonville Jaguars as a Free Agent.

=== Free agents in 2009 ===
RFA: Restricted free-agent, UFA: Unrestricted free-agent, ERFA: Exclusive rights free agent

Position	Player	Free agency tag	Date signed	2009 team
WR	Hank Baskett	RFA	2/26/09	Indianapolis Colts
RB	Correll Buckhalter	UFA	2/27/09	Denver Broncos
C	Nick Cole	RFA	2/26/09	Philadelphia Eagles
SS	Sean Considine	UFA	2/27/09	Jacksonville Jaguars
FS	Brian Dawkins	UFA	2/28/09	Denver Broncos
CB	Joselio Hanson	UFA	2/20/09	Philadelphia Eagles
OT	Jon Runyan	UFA		
TE	L. J. Smith	UFA	3/27/09	Baltimore Ravens
OT	Tra Thomas	UFA	3/9/09	Jacksonville Jaguars

=== 2009 NFL Draft selections ===
2009 Philadelphia Eagles NFL Draft selections
Draft order		Player name	Position	Height	Weight	College
Round	Choice	Player name	Position	Height	Weight	College
1	19	Jeremy Maclin	WR	6 ft 0 in	199 lb	Missouri
2	53	LeSean McCoy	HB	5 ft 11 in	210 lb	Pittsburgh
5	153	Cornelius Ingram	TE	6 ft 4 in	245 lb	Florida
5	157	Victor Harris	CB	5 ft 11 in	197 lb	Virginia Tech
5	159	Fenuki Tupou	OT	6 ft 6 in	322 lb	Oregon
6	194	Brandon Gibson	WR	6 ft 1 in	200 lb	Washington State
7	213	Paul Fanaika	G	6 ft 5 in	327 lb	Arizona State
7	230	Moise Fokou	LB	6 ft 2 in	225 lb	Maryland

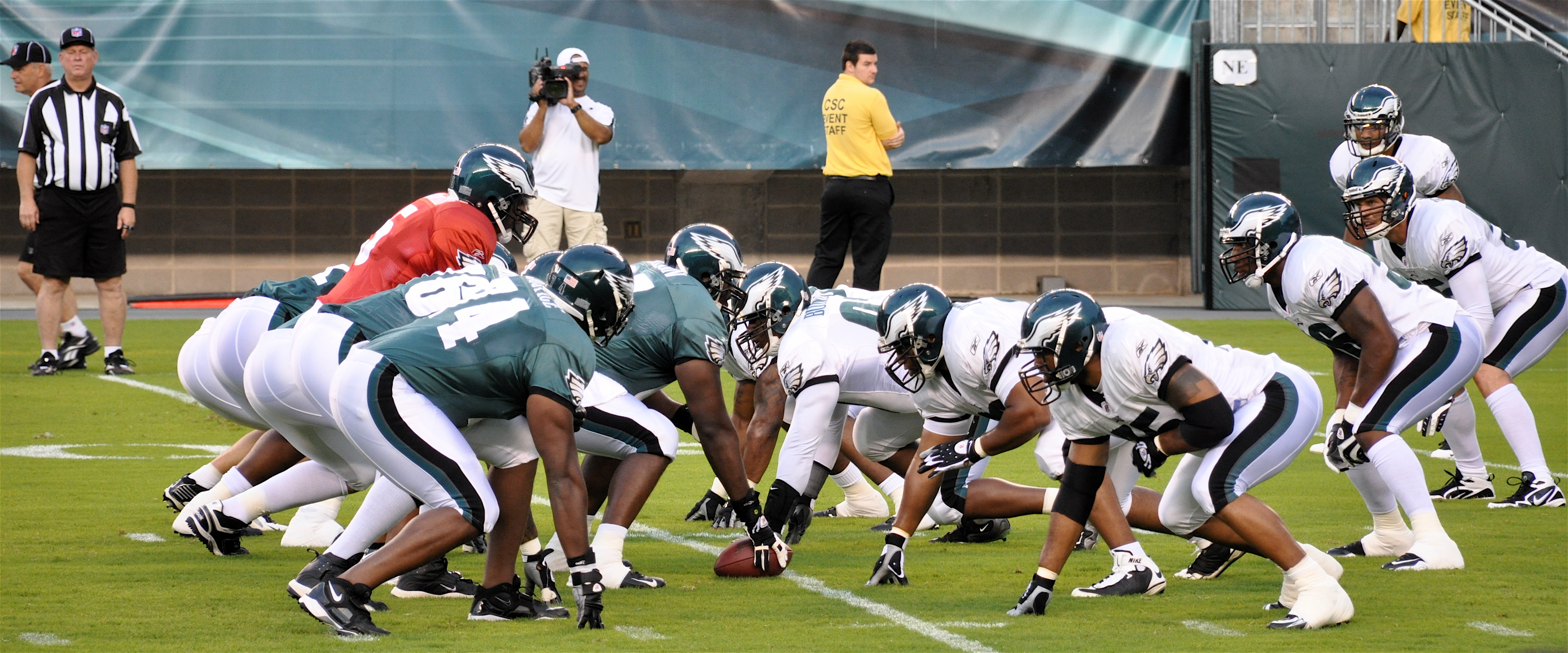
Summer scrimmage game during preseason

- Carolina to Philadelphia. Carolina traded its first-round selection in 2009, as well as its second-round (No. 43: traded to Minnesota and used to select safety Tyrell Johnson) and fourth-round (No. 109: used to select offensive guard Mike McGlynn) selections in 2008 to Philadelphia for the first-round selection of Philadelphia in 2008 (No. 19: used to select offensive tackle Jeff Otah).
- Philadelphia to Buffalo. Philadelphia traded the 28th overall selection in 2009 (which originally was Carolina's 2009 first-round selection), its fourth-round selection in 2009, and a conditional sixth-round selection in 2010 in return for offensive tackle Jason Peters.
- Cleveland to Philadelphia. Cleveland traded its fifth-round selection in 2009 to Philadelphia for Philadelphia's sixth-round selection in 2008 (No. 191: used to select wide receiver Paul Hubbard).
- New York Jets to Philadelphia The New York Jets traded their fifth-round selection and a conditional selection in 2010 to Philadelphia in return for cornerback Lito Sheppard.
- Patriots to Philadelphia. Patriots traded its fifth-round selection in 2009 to Philadelphia for wide receiver Greg Lewis.
- Minnesota to Philadelphia. Minnesota traded its sixth-round selection to Philadelphia for quarterback Kelly Holcomb.

== Staff ==
Philadelphia Eagles 2009 staff
Front office: Chairman/CEO – Jeffrey Lurie; President/coo – Joe Banner; General manager – Tom Heckert Jr.; Vice president of player personnel – Howie Roseman; Director of college scouting – Ryan Grigson; Director of pro personnel – Jon Sandusky; Assistant director of pro personnel – Louis Riddick; Head coaches: Head coach – Andy Reid; Assistant head coach/offensive coordinator – Marty Mornhinweg; Offensive coaches: Quarterbacks – James Urban; Running backs – Ted Williams; Wide receivers – David Culley; Tight ends – Tom Melvin; Offensive line – Juan Castillo; Offensive quality control – Doug Pederson; Statistical analysis coordinator – Mike Frazier; Coaching assistant – Corey Matthaei; Coaching intern – Matt Nagy	Defensive coaches: Defensive coordinator – Sean McDermott; Defensive line – Rory Segrest; Linebackers – Bill Shuey; Defensive assistant/special assistant – Brian Stewart; Defensive quality control – Mike Caldwell; Training camp volunteer – Carnell Lake; Special teams coaches: Special teams coordinator – Ted Daisher; Assistant special teams/offensive assistant – Jeff Nixon; Strength and conditioning: Head athletic trainer – Rick Burkholder; Head strength and conditioning – Mike Wolf; Assistant strength and conditioning – Barry Rubin

== Final roster ==
2009 Philadelphia Eagles roster
Quarterbacks (QB): 4 Kevin Kolb; 5 Donovan McNabb; 7 Michael Vick; Running backs (RB): 34 Eldra Buckley; 29 LeSean McCoy; 43 Leonard Weaver; 36 Brian Westbrook; Wide receivers (WR): 81 Jason Avant; 86 Reggie Brown; 80 Kevin Curtis; 10 DeSean Jackson; 18 Jeremy Maclin; Tight ends (TE): 87 Brent Celek; 89 Martin Rucker; 82 Alex Smith	Offensive linemen (OL): 76 Stacy Andrews G; 59 Nick Cole C/G; 65 King Dunlap T; 79 Todd Herremans G/T; 62 Max Jean-Gilles G; 74 Winston Justice T; 77 Mike McGlynn G; 71 Jason Peters T; 66 Dallas Reynolds C; Defensive linemen (DL): 95 Victor Abiamiri DE; 94 Jason Babin DE; 97 Brodrick Bunkley DT; 91 Chris Clemons DE; 58 Trent Cole DE; 64 Antonio Dixon DT; 90 Darren Howard DE; 93 Trevor Laws DT; 75 Juqua Parker DE; 98 Mike Patterson DT	Linebackers (LB): 53 Moise Fokou OLB; 57 Chris Gocong OLB; 56 Akeem Jordan OLB; 51 Joe Mays MLB; 54 Jeremiah Trotter MLB; 52 Tracy White OLB; 50 Will Witherspoon MLB/OLB; Defensive backs (DB): 24 Sheldon Brown CB; 39 Quintin Demps SS/KR; 21 Joselio Hanson CB; 35 Macho Harris FS/KR; 26 Sean Jones FS; 27 Quintin Mikell SS; 23 Dimitri Patterson CB; 30 Geoffrey Pope CB; 22 Asante Samuel CB; Special teams (ST): 2 David Akers K; 46 Jon Dorenbos LS; 6 Sav Rocca P	Practice squad: 63 Gerald Cadogan T; 11 Dobson Collins WR; 25 Allen Ervin RB; 48 Joel Gamble FB; 45 Brandon Harrison S; 68 Greg Isdaner G; 84 Jordan Norwood WR; 37 Chris Roberson CB; Reserve: 73 Shawn Andrews T (IR); 55 Stewart Bradley LB (IR); 96 Omar Gaither LB (IR); 31 Ellis Hobbs CB/KR (IR); 88 Cornelius Ingram TE (IR); 67 Jamaal Jackson C (IR); 78 Fenuki Tupou G (IR); Rookies in italics 53 active, 7 reserve, 8 practice squad

== Preseason ==
Week	Date	Opponent	Result	Record	Venue	Recap
1	August 13	New England Patriots	L 25–27	0–1	Lincoln Financial Field	Recap
2	August 20	at Indianapolis Colts	L 15–23	0–2	Lucas Oil Stadium	Recap
3	August 27	Jacksonville Jaguars	W 33–32	1–2	Lincoln Financial Field	Recap
4	September 3	at New York Jets	L 27–38	1–3	Giants Stadium	Recap

== Regular season ==
=== Schedule ===
Week	Date	Opponent	Result	Record	Venue	Recap
1	September 13	at Carolina Panthers	**W** 38–10	1–0	Bank of America Stadium	Recap
2	September 20	New Orleans Saints	**L** 22–48	1–1	Lincoln Financial Field	Recap
3	September 27	Kansas City Chiefs	**W** 34–14	2–1	Lincoln Financial Field	Recap
4	Bye					
5	October 11	Tampa Bay Buccaneers	**W** 33–14	3–1	Lincoln Financial Field	Recap
6	October 18	at Oakland Raiders	**L** 9–13	3–2	Oakland–Alameda County Coliseum	Recap
7	October 26	at **Washington Redskins**	**W** 27–17	4–2	FedExField	Recap
8	November 1	**New York Giants**	**W** 40–17	5–2	Lincoln Financial Field	Recap
9	November 8	**Dallas Cowboys**	**L** 16–20	5–3	Lincoln Financial Field	Recap
10	November 15	at San Diego Chargers	**L** 23–31	5–4	Qualcomm Stadium	Recap
11	November 22	at Chicago Bears	**W** 24–20	6–4	Soldier Field	Recap
12	November 29	**Washington Redskins**	**W** 27–24	7–4	Lincoln Financial Field	Recap
13	December 6	at Atlanta Falcons	**W** 34–7	8–4	Georgia Dome	Recap
14	December 13	at **New York Giants**	**W** 45–38	9–4	Giants Stadium	Recap
15	December 20	San Francisco 49ers	**W** 27–13	10–4	Lincoln Financial Field	Recap
16	December 27	Denver Broncos	**W** 30–27	11–4	Lincoln Financial Field	Recap
17	January 3	at **Dallas Cowboys**	**L** 0–24	11–5	Cowboys Stadium	Recap

Note: Intra-division opponents are in bold text.

=== Game summaries ===
==== Week 1: at Carolina Panthers ====
Philadelphia Eagles at Carolina Panthers

Team	1	2	3	4	Total
• Eagles	3	28	7	0	38
Panthers	7	3	0	0	10

- Location: Bank of America Stadium, Charlotte, North Carolina
- Game start: 1:00 p.m. EST
- Game attendance: 73,599
- Game weather: 83 °F (28 °C), Sunny
- Referee: Jeff Triplette
- TV announcers (Fox): Dick Stockton, Charles Davis, and Laura Okmin

The Eagles began their season at Bank of America Stadium for a Week 1 duel with the Carolina Panthers. Philadelphia trailed early in the first quarter as Panthers running back DeAngelo Williams ran 11 yards for a Carolina touchdown on their first drive. The Eagles answered with a 49-yard field goal from kicker David Akers. In the second quarter, Philadelphia exploded with points as defensive end Victor Abiamiri returned a fumble 2 yards for a touchdown, wide receiver DeSean Jackson returned a punt 85 yards for a touchdown, and quarterback Donovan McNabb completed a 9-yard touchdown pass to tight end Brent Celek and a 4-yard touchdown pass to running back Brian Westbrook. Carolina ended the period with kicker John Kasay booting a 22-yard field goal.

In the third quarter, the Eagles closed out their scoring with McNabb scoring on a 3-yard touchdown run. However, he was hit late by several Carolina tacklers who cracked his ribs on the right side, knocking him out of the game. Kevin Kolb came in for McNabb and closed out the game for the victorious Eagles.

With the win, Philadelphia began their season at 1–0.

==== Week 2: vs. New Orleans Saints ====
New Orleans Saints at Philadelphia Eagles

Team	1	2	3	4	Total
• Saints	10	7	17	14	48
Eagles	7	6	7	2	22

- Location: Lincoln Financial Field, Philadelphia
- Game start: 1:00 p.m. EST
- Game attendance: 69,144
- Game weather: 73 °F (23 °C), (Sunny)
- Referee: Alberto Riveron
- TV announcers (Fox): Joe Buck, Troy Aikman, and Pam Oliver

Coming off their road win over the Panthers, the Eagles played their Week 2 home opener against the New Orleans Saints. Due to the rib injury to quarterback Donovan McNabb, backup quarterback Kevin Kolb was named the starter.

In the first quarter, Philadelphia trailed as Saints quarterback Drew Brees completed a 15-yard touchdown pass to wide receiver Marques Colston. The Eagles would answer with Kolb completing a 71-yard touchdown pass to wide receiver DeSean Jackson, but New Orleans replied with kicker John Carney making a 23-yard field goal. In the second quarter, Philadelphia would tie the game again as kicker David Akers got a 23-yard field goal. However, the Saints struck back as Brees hooked up with Colston again on a 25-yard touchdown pass. The Eagles would close out the half as Akers made a 32-yard field goal.

In the third quarter, New Orleans began to pull away as Brees completed an 11-yard touchdown pass to fullback Heath Evans, along with running back Mike Bell getting a 7-yard touchdown. Philadelphia would answer with Kolb completing a 3-yard touchdown pass to wide receiver Jason Avant. In the fourth quarter, the Saints continued to pull away as running back Reggie Bush got a 19-yard touchdown run. The Eagles would get a score as Brees fumbled the ball out of his own end zone, giving Philadelphia a safety. However, the Saints closed out their victory march as safety Darren Sharper returned an interception 97 yards for a touchdown.

With the loss, Philadelphia fell to 1–1.

==== Week 3: vs. Kansas City Chiefs ====
Kansas City Chiefs at Philadelphia Eagles

Team	1	2	3	4	Total
Chiefs	0	7	0	7	14
• Eagles	14	10	3	7	34

- Location: Lincoln Financial Field, Philadelphia
- Game start: 1:00 p.m. EST
- Game attendance: 69,144
- Game weather: 70 °F (21 °C), (Rain)
- Referee: John Parry
- TV announcers (CBS): Kevin Harlan and Solomon Wilcots

The Eagles entered their second home game of the season at 1–1 and facing an 0–2 Kansas City Chiefs team. Kevin Kolb once again started in place of the injured Donovan McNabb and starting running back Brian Westbrook, starting left guard Todd Herremans (who had been out the first two weeks as well), and number two wide receiver Kevin Curtis all missed the game as well. Nevertheless, the Eagles struck first as rookie RB LeSean McCoy, starting in place of Westbrook, scored on a five-yard touchdown scamper. Later in the first quarter, Kevin Kolb scored his first ever NFL rushing TD on a quarterback sneak to put Philadelphia up 14–0 at the end of the first quarter.

In the second quarter, Matt Cassel scored the Chiefs' first touchdown of the game on a nice pass to a leaping Mark Bradley over the head of CB Ellis Hobbs to cut the Eagles' lead to seven. However, Philadelphia bounced back as Kevin Kolb hooked up with DeSean Jackson for a 64-yard score. The Eagles tacked on an Akers field goal to go up 24–7 at the half.

The Philadelphia defense which had been great all day continued to do their jobs in the third quarter and the Kansas City began to step up their game as the only score of the third period was a 38-yard field goal kick by David Akers, putting the Eagles up 27–7.

In the fourth quarter, Kevin Kolb tossed another touchdown pass, this time to starting third-year TE Brent Celek. It was Philly's last score of the game and put them up 34–7. Matt Cassel began to rally the Chiefs and drove them down the field, scoring a touchdown on a nine-yard pass to Bobby Wade, making the score 34–14. However, the Chiefs were unable to get on the board again and 34–14 was the final score. Kolb is the first quarterback to throw at least 300 yards in his first 2 career starts.

With the win, the Eagles went into their bye week at 2–1.

==== Week 5: vs. Tampa Bay Buccaneers ====
Tampa Bay Buccaneers at Philadelphia Eagles

Team	1	2	3	4	Total
Buccaneers	0	7	0	7	14
• Eagles	7	14	7	5	33

- Location: Lincoln Financial Field, Philadelphia
- Game start: 1:00 p.m. EST
- Game attendance: 69,144
- Game weather: 62 °F (17 °C), (Sunny)
- Referee: Terry McAulay
- TV announcers (Fox): Sam Rosen and Tim Ryan

The Eagles returned from their Week 4 bye against an 0–4 Tampa Bay Buccaneers team, Philadelphia's second straight game against a winless team. Donovan McNabb and Brian Westbrook returned from injury but Kevin Curtis once again was inactive and Jeremy Maclin made his third consecutive start.

On Donovan McNabb's first play back, he scrambled 13 yards, and on the very next play, he found wide receiver Jeremy Maclin deep in the end zone for a 51-yard touchdown.

In the second quarter, Donovan McNabb hit fullback Leonard Weaver in the flat and Weaver took it in for a 20-yard touchdown. The Buccaneers answered soon after as quarterback Josh Johnson, making his second career NFL start, connected with tight end Kellen Winslow in the end one for a nine-yard score. The Eagles ended the second half with another McNabb-to-Maclin TD hookup, this one of 40 yards.

In the third quarter, the two teams fought back and forth but the only score was for Philadelphia as running back Brian Westbrook, one play after lining up wide and catching a twenty-yard pass from McNabb, ran the ball seven yards into the end zone to put the Eagles up 28–7.

Kicker David Akers booted a 44-yard field goal in the fourth quarter to put Philly up 31–7, but the Bucs fought back as Josh Johnson and Kellen Winslow hooked up again on another nine-yard touchdown. After a Sav Rocca punt left the Buccaneers deep in their own territory, DE Darren Howard tackled Tampa Bay halfback Carnell "Cadillac" Williams in the end zone for a safety.

The final score was 33–14 as the Eagles improved to 3–1. Andy Reid earned his 100th career victory with the Eagles. The Eagles are 11–0 after their bye week under Andy Reid.

==== Week 6: at Oakland Raiders ====
Philadelphia Eagles at Oakland Raiders

Team	1	2	3	4	Total
Eagles	3	3	0	3	9
• Raiders	7	3	0	3	13

- Location: Oakland–Alameda County Coliseum, Oakland, California
- Game start: 4:05 p.m. EST
- Game attendance: 49,642
- Game weather: 62 °F (17 °C), Cloudy
- Referee: Pete Morelli
- TV announcers (Fox): Sam Rosen and Tim Ryan

Coming off their home win over the Buccaneers, the Eagles flew to the Oakland–Alameda County Coliseum for a Week 6 interconference duel with the Oakland Raiders.

In the first quarter, both defenses played well, with the Eagles getting on the board first with a 45-yard field goal from kicker David Akers. However, the Raiders responded as QB JaMarcus Russell hooked up with TE Zach Miller on an 86-yard touchdown pass.

In the second quarter, Oakland kicker Sebastian Janikowski hit a 29-yard field goal and Akers would hit a 43-yarder. Philadelphia got the ball back before the half but sputtered as they got close to the Oakland end zone, and the half ended with the Raiders up 10–6.

In the third quarter, the defenses battled back and forth and neither team scored.

The final quarter's first points were scored by Oakland as Janikowski hit on a 46-yard field goal. David Akers scored on a 45-yard field goal for the Eagles, but when they got the ball back late in the fourth quarter, they turned it over on downs and the Raiders ran the clock out.

With the loss, the Eagles fell to 3–2.

==== Week 7: at Washington Redskins ====
Philadelphia Eagles at Washington Redskins

Team	1	2	3	4	Total
• Eagles	14	13	0	0	27
Redskins	0	10	0	7	17

- Location: FedExField, Landover, Maryland
- Game start: 8:30 p.m. EST
- Game attendance: 88,241
- Game weather: 57 °F (14 °C), Clear
- Referee: Bill Leavy
- TV announcers (ESPN): Mike Tirico, Ron Jaworski, and Jon Gruden

Hoping to rebound from their road loss to the Raiders, the Eagles flew to FedExField for a Week 7 NFC East duel with the Washington Redskins on Monday night. Philadelphia took flight in the first quarter with wide receiver DeSean Jackson's 67-yard touchdown run and linebacker Will Witherspoon (recently acquired from the Rams) returning an interception 9 yards for a touchdown.

In the second quarter, the Eagles increased their lead with a 47-yard field goal from kicker David Akers. The Redskins would get on the board with quarterback Jason Campbell completing a 2-yard touchdown pass to wide receiver Devin Thomas, yet Philadelphia answered with Akers nailing a 44-yard field goal and quarterback Donovan McNabb completing a 57-yard touchdown pass to Jackson. Washington would close out the half with a 47-yard field goal from kicker Shaun Suisham.

In the third quarter, both defenses fought back and forth and the period ended with no points.

In the fourth and final quarter, Jason Campbell completed a one-yard touchdown pass to tight end Fred Davis for the only score of the second half.

The Eagles defense held on and, with the win, Philadelphia improved to 4–2.

==== Week 8: vs. New York Giants ====
New York Giants at Philadelphia Eagles

Team	1	2	3	4	Total
Giants	0	7	10	0	17
• Eagles	13	17	3	7	40

- Location: Lincoln Financial Field, Philadelphia
- Game start: 1:00 p.m. EST
- Game attendance: 69,144
- Game weather: 55 °F (13 °C), (Sunny)
- Referee: Carl Cheffers
- TV announcers (Fox): Kenny Albert, Daryl Johnston, and Tony Siragusa

This game was originally scheduled to have been a 4:15 PM start; however the NFL moved this game to 1 PM in order to accommodate the Philadelphia Phillies hosting Game 4 of that year's World Series.

Coming off their Monday night road win over the Redskins, the Eagles went home for a Week 8 NFC East duel with the New York Giants with the division lead on the line.

Philadelphia came out soaring in the first quarter as fullback Leonard Weaver got a 41-yard touchdown run, followed by quarterback Donovan McNabb hooking up with tight end Brent Celek on a 17-yard touchdown pass (with a blocked PAT). In the second quarter, the Eagles increased their lead as kicker David Akers nailed a 30-yard field goal. The Giants would get on the board as quarterback Eli Manning found tight end Kevin Boss on an 18-yard touchdown pass, yet Philadelphia kept their momentum going as McNabb completed a 54-yard touchdown pass to wide receiver DeSean Jackson and a 23-yard touchdown pass to rookie wide receiver Jeremy Maclin.

The Eagles would increase their lead in the third quarter as Akers booted a 35-yard field goal, yet New York attempted to rally as kicker Lawrence Tynes made a 42-yard field goal and running back Ahmad Bradshaw got a 1-yard touchdown run. In the fourth quarter, Philadelphia pulled away with a 66-yard touchdown run by rookie running back LeSean McCoy.

With the win, not only did the Eagles improve to 5–2, but they would take over as the leader of the NFC East.

==== Week 9: vs. Dallas Cowboys ====
Dallas Cowboys at Philadelphia Eagles

Team	1	2	3	4	Total
• Cowboys	7	3	0	10	20
Eagles	0	6	7	3	16

- Location: Lincoln Financial Field, Philadelphia
- Game start: 8:20 p.m. EST
- Game attendance: 69,144
- Game weather: 50 °F (10 °C), (Clear)
- Referee: Walt Coleman
- TV announcers (NBC): Al Michaels, Cris Collinsworth, and Andrea Kremer

Coming off their win over the Giants, the Eagles stayed at home for a Week 9 Sunday night divisional duel with the Dallas Cowboys with the lead in the NFC East on the line.

Philadelphia would trail in the first quarter as Cowboys running back Tashard Choice picked up a 2-yard touchdown run. The Eagles would respond in the second quarter with a 45-yard and a 48-yard field goal from kicker David Akers, but Dallas would answer with kicker Nick Folk nailing a 22-yard field goal.

In the third quarter, Philadelphia would take the lead as quarterback Donovan McNabb found tight end Brent Celek on an 11-yard touchdown pass. However, the Cowboys struck back in the fourth quarter with Folk's 33-yard field goal and quarterback Tony Romo's 49-yard touchdown pass to wide receiver Miles Austin. The Eagles tried to get a comeback, but could only muster up a 52-yard field goal from Akers.

With the loss, the Eagles fell to 5–3.

==== Week 10: at San Diego Chargers ====
Philadelphia Eagles at San Diego Chargers

Team	1	2	3	4	Total
Eagles	0	6	3	14	23
• Chargers	7	7	14	3	31

- Location: Qualcomm Stadium, San Diego, California
- Game start: 4:15 p.m. EST
- Game attendance: 68,879
- Game weather: 71 °F (22 °C), Sunny
- Referee: Jerome Boger
- TV announcers (Fox): Thom Brennaman, Brian Billick, and Charissa Thompson

Hoping to rebound from their tough Sunday night loss to the Cowboys, the Eagles flew to Qualcomm Stadium for a Week 10 interconference duel with the San Diego Chargers. Philadelphia would trail in the first quarter as Chargers quarterback Philip Rivers completed a 20-yard touchdown pass to fullback Mike Tolbert. San Diego would add onto their lead in the second quarter with running back LaDainian Tomlinson's 3-yard touchdown run. The Eagles would get on the board with kicker David Akers getting an 18-yard and a 25-yard field goal.

In the third quarter, the Chargers went back to work as Tomlinson got a 20-yard touchdown run. Philadelphia would try to stay close as Akers nailed a 25-yard field goal, but San Diego kept their attack going as Rivers hooked up with wide receiver Legedu Naanee on a 20-yard touchdown pass. The Eagles' offense would finally get going in the fourth quarter as quarterback Donovan McNabb completed a 5-yard touchdown pass to rookie wide receiver Jeremy Maclin and a 6-yard touchdown pass to tight end Brent Celek. However, the Chargers would prove to be too much to handle as kicker Nate Kaeding booted a 29-yard field goal.

With the loss, the Eagles fell to 5–4.

==== Week 11: at Chicago Bears ====
Philadelphia Eagles at Chicago Bears

Team	1	2	3	4	Total
• Eagles	10	0	7	7	24
Bears	0	9	11	0	20

- Location: Soldier Field, Chicago
- Game start: 8:20 p.m. EST
- Game attendance: 62,421
- Game weather: 47 °F (8 °C), Clear
- Referee: Tony Corrente
- TV announcers (NBC): Al Michaels, Cris Collinsworth, and Andrea Kremer

Following two consecutive losses to Dallas and San Diego, Philadelphia went to Chicago to take on the Chicago Bears, who were 4–5, on Sunday Night Football. The Eagles dominated the first quarter as Philadelphia took a two score lead on a 25-yard field goal by David Akers and a 13-yard touchdown from Donovan McNabb to Jason Avant on a wide receiver screen pass.

Down 10–0 at the start of the second quarter, Chicago drove within one point as Bears kicker Robbie Gould successfully made a 45-yard field goal, as well as a pair of 28-yard field goals, to make the score 10–9 at the half.

In the second half, the Bears took the lead as Robbie Gould kicked his fourth field goal, a 49-yarder that put Chicago up 12–10. However, it took only 30 seconds for the Eagles to take the lead as Donovan McNabb passed to DeSean Jackson for a 48-yard touchdown to give the Eagles a 17–12 lead. Ironically, the 48-yard touchdown catch was the shortest touchdown scored by Jackson thus far in the season. Chicago again took the lead in the third quarter as struggling quarterback Jay Cutler, who had already missed several wide open targets in the game, passed to tight end Kellen Davis for a 15-yard score. The Bears converted the 2-point conversion attempt as running back Matt Forte scored on the pass from Cutler to put the Bears back on top 20–17.

In the fourth quarter, both defenses fought back and forth but the only points of the final period were scored by Eagles running back LeSean McCoy on a 10-yard, game-winning touchdown run to put the Eagles up 24–20, the game's final score.

With the win, the Eagles improved to 6–4. Ironically, the Eagles win came by the same score (24–20) in the same city (Chicago) at the same time and venue (Sunday Night Football on NBC) as when they had lost in week 4 of the 2008 season.

==== Week 12: vs. Washington Redskins ====
Washington Redskins at Philadelphia Eagles

Team	1	2	3	4	Total
Redskins	7	7	7	3	24
• Eagles	10	6	0	11	27

- Location: Lincoln Financial Field, Philadelphia
- Game start: 1:00 p.m. EST
- Game attendance: 69,144
- Game weather: 61 °F (16 °C), (Sunny)
- Referee: Gene Steratore
- TV announcers (Fox): Kenny Albert, Daryl Johnston, and Tony Siragusa

In the second meeting of the year with the Washington Redskins, the Eagles tried an onside kick to start the game. This backfired when the Redskins running back Quinton Ganther recovered the kick and returned it 25 yards to the Eagles 24-yard line. Four plays later, Redskins quarterback Jason Campbell ran for a two-yard touchdown to score the game's first touchdown, as the Redskins took the lead 7–0. After a holding penalty on Eagles tight end Brent Celek, the Eagles had to settle for a 29-yard field goal by kicker David Akers. On the following drive by the Eagles, quarterback Donovan McNabb found wide receiver DeSean Jackson wide open in the end zone for a 35-yard touchdown to bring the Eagles up 10–7. On the ensuing drive by the Redskins, Campbell threw a 4-yard touchdown pass to Santana Moss to take the lead 14–10.

Late in the second quarter, after both teams punting the ball away after three unsuccessful drives, Eagles cornerback Asante Samuel intercepted a Jason Campbell pass that was intended for Santana Moss. The Eagles could not convert a third down with 10 to go, and David Akers kicked a 24-yard field goal to get the Eagles within a point of the Redskins, 14–13. The Redskins received the ball again and Campbell threw a second straight interception to Samuel, who returned it for 17 yards. The Eagles ended the first half with a second straight field goal to take the lead 16–14.

The Eagles got the ball to start the second half, but the drive ended with a Sav Rocca punt. Jason Campbell threw a 10-yard touchdown to tight end Fred Davis to take the lead once again, 21–16.

After two straight punts for each team, the Eagles got the ball back in the fourth quarter and Donovan McNabb threw an intended pass to Reggie Brown, but the pass was intercepted by Redskins cornerback Justin Tryon. The Redskins scored on a 25-yard field goal by Shaun Suisham, to increase their lead 24–16. The Eagles started their drive on their own 10-yard line after a penalty on the kick return by Dimitri Patterson. The Eagles went 90 yards to score on an Eldra Buckley one-yard touchdown run. Since they were losing by two points, the Eagles decided to go for a two-point conversion. The two-point conversion was successful after rookie running back LeSean McCoy ran in the end zone on a shovel pass from McNabb. The score was tied, 24–24. The Redskins could not score on the next drive, and therefore had to punt to the Eagles. The Eagles scored on a 32-yard field goal by David Akers to take the lead, 27–24. The Eagles got the ball back on downs, and kneeled the ball to run out the clock and win 27–24.

With the win, the Eagles improved to 7–4.

==== Week 13: at Atlanta Falcons ====
Philadelphia Eagles at Atlanta Falcons

Team	1	2	3	4	Total
• Eagles	10	3	14	7	34
Falcons	0	0	0	7	7

- Location: Georgia Dome, Atlanta
- Game start: 1:00 p.m. EST
- Game attendance: 69,560
- Game weather: indoors (dome)
- Referee: Ed Hochuli
- TV announcers (Fox): Kenny Albert, Daryl Johnston, and Tony Siragusa

Following back to back wins against Chicago and Washington, the Eagles traveled to Atlanta to take on the Atlanta Falcons who were 6–5. While the Falcons were without quarterback Matt Ryan and running back Michael Turner due to injury, as well as a pair of offensive linemen, the Eagles came into the game without explosive wideout DeSean Jackson, linebacker Akeem Jordan, or nickel corner Joselio Hanson, who had been suspended by the league for violating its substance abuse policy.

In the first quarter, Eagles kicker David Akers scored on a 33-yard field goal and fullback Leonard Weaver, who would go on to make an outstanding one-handed, 59-yard catch-and-run, and finish the game with 100 total yards, caught an under thrown ball by Donovan McNabb in the end zone for a 4-yard touchdown that put the Eagles up 10–0.

Atlanta's backup quarterback Chris Redman struggled all game and backup running backs Jerious Norwood and Jason Snelling seemed, in most cases, unable to find holes, and both offenses struggled in the second quarter, the only score coming on another 33-yard field goal by David Akers.

The Eagles dominated the third quarter as quarterback Michael Vick, in his return to Atlanta, ran in a five-yard score to put the Eagles up 20–0, his first touchdown of the year. It kept getting worse for Atlanta as Chris Redman, who had had pass after pass batted at the line during the game, was intercepted by cornerback Sheldon Brown, who returned the interception 83 yards for a score.

Philly went up 34–0 in the fourth quarter as Michael Vick, coming in as a relief player for Donovan McNabb, tossed a 5-yard touchdown pass to tight end Brent Celek. The Eagles defense seemed to be en route to their first shutout since 1996, but the Falcons scored with one second left on the clock on a 3-yard touchdown pass from Redman to wide receiver Roddy White.

The Eagles third consecutive win left them 8–4, heading into a pivotal Sunday Night matchup against their division rival New York Giants.

==== Week 14: at New York Giants ====
Philadelphia Eagles at New York Giants

Team	1	2	3	4	Total
• Eagles	14	16	7	8	45
Giants	3	14	14	7	38

- Location: Giants Stadium, East Rutherford, New Jersey
- Game start: 8:20 p.m. EST
- Game attendance: 78,780
- Game weather: 42 °F (6 °C), Clear
- Referee: John Parry
- TV announcers (NBC): Al Michaels, Cris Collinsworth, and Andrea Kremer

The winner of this Sunday Night showdown would assume first place in the NFC East (the Eagles outright, the Giants on tiebreakers). With two games against opponents with losing records approaching, it was crucial for the Giants to escape this one with a win.

The Eagles started things off right away, putting 14 points on the board before the Giants had run their fifth play from scrimmage. McNabb connected with Celek for a touchdown, and Sheldon Brown returned a Brandon Jacobs fumble for six points on the ensuing drive. In the second quarter, Nicks caught the longest reception of his short career for a 68-yard touchdown. After DeSean Jackson responded by returning a Jeff Feagles punt 72 yards for a touchdown, the Giants were able to send Bradshaw into the end zone from the 3. Eagles backup quarterback Michael Vick was able to sneak in one more rushing touchdown before halftime. Jacobs opened the scoring in the second half with a 1-yard rush. After the teams traded turnovers, Manning got the ball into Hixon's hands for a 61-yard touchdown. But the Eagles responded on the very next play with a 60-yard touchdown to Jackson. Jackson's 176 receiving yards amounted to the best individual receiving performance against the Giants since 2002. The Eagles struck again in the fourth quarter, this time on a run by fullback Leonard Weaver and a two-point conversion pass to Jason Avant. The Giants put another touchdown on the board (courtesy of Boss) in the last two minutes of the game, and got the ball back with 28 seconds left. But defensive end Darren Howard sacked Manning and forced a fumble, sealing the Eagles' first sweep of the Giants since 2004.

The Eagles scored 85 points against the Giants this year, the most they have scored versus the Giants in a single season in franchise history. The Eagles have improved to 9–4 with many hopes of making it into the playoffs.

==== Week 15: vs. San Francisco 49ers ====
San Francisco 49ers at Philadelphia Eagles

Team	1	2	3	4	Total
49ers	3	0	10	0	13
• Eagles	7	13	0	7	27

- Location: Lincoln Financial Field, Philadelphia
- Game start: 4:15 p.m. EST
- Game attendance: 69,144
- Game weather: 32 °F (0 °C) (Sunny)
- Referee: Don Carey
- TV announcers (Fox): Kenny Albert, Daryl Johnston, and Tony Siragusa

After taking control of the NFC East in New York, the Eagles came back home to face a 6–7 49ers team who were coming off of a 15-point win against the Cardinals.

Upon receiving the opening kickoff, the Eagles' first possession began from the 50-yard line after a great return of 48 yards by Quintin Demps. With excellent field position to start, the Eagles would march through 49ers territory and score the game's first touchdown to cap off a 5-play, 50-yard drive on a 19-yard touchdown pass from Donovan McNabb to DeSean Jackson. The 49ers responded within 3 minutes with a 51-yard field goal by Joe Nedney to cut the Eagles' lead down to 7–3. Before the end of the 1st quarter, both teams turned the ball over once: 49ers QB Alex Smith was picked off at the Philadelphia 32-yard line by Quintin Mikell and, during a later possession, the Eagles were stopped on 4th down at their own 29-yard line after RB Leonard Weaver failed to convert on 4th and 1.

On the very first play of the second quarter, with the 49ers threatening to score, tight end Delanie Walker's fumble was recovered by Eagles' cornerback Asante Samuel at the Philadelphia 6-yard line. The Eagles turned it into 13 more points, coming off of an 8-yard touchdown run by McNabb and two short David Akers field goals. The Eagles took a commanding 20–3 lead into halftime. In the third quarter, San Francisco held the Eagles scoreless while managing 10 points of their own to trim the deficit to 7. Joe Nedney nailed another field goal, this time from 25 yards, and Alex Smith connected with Josh Morgan on a 12-yard touchdown pass as the Eagles took a 20–13 lead into the 4th. From there, the 49ers would not score again and the Eagles would put the game away with a 2-yard rushing touchdown by LeSean McCoy. The Eagles won the game 27–13.

With the win, the Eagles improved to 10–4 and remained atop the division, holding a 1-game lead over the Dallas Cowboys. The Eagles also clinched a playoff berth, the 8th of the Andy Reid/ Donovan Mcnabb era.

==== Week 16: vs. Denver Broncos ====
Denver Broncos at Philadelphia Eagles

Team	1	2	3	4	Total
Broncos	0	7	17	3	27
• Eagles	10	10	7	3	30

- Location: Lincoln Financial Field, Philadelphia
- Game start: 4:15 p.m. EST
- Game attendance: 69,144
- Game weather: 41 °F (5 °C) (Sunny)
- Referee: Mike Carey
- TV announcers (CBS): Jim Nantz and Phil Simms

NFC East leaders for the second straight week, the 10–4 Eagles remained home for an interconference matchup with the 8–6 Denver Broncos.

The Eagles jumped out to an early 10–0 lead in the 1st quarter, recovering from a quick turnover on their first possession. Philadelphia quarterback Donovan McNabb was sacked, losing the ball in the process. The loose ball was picked up by Denver's Darrell Reid. The Philadelphia defense was able to keep the Broncos from turning it into any points, forcing a punt, and scored on their next possession with a 2-yard touchdown pass to DeSean Jackson. Soon after, David Akers' 39 yard field goal pushed the Eagles' lead to 10, closing the first quarter. Denver answered with an 11-yard touchdown pass from quarterback Kyle Orton to wide receiver Jabar Gaffney, capping off a 12-play, 70-yard drive on their very first possession of the second period. Up 10–7, the Eagles immediately responded on the following drive as Donovan McNabb hit his tight end Brent Celek for a 47-yard passing touchdown. The Eagles forced another punt, David Akers added 3 more points on his second field goal of the day, and the Eagles' halftime lead stood at 13.

Now down 20–7, the Broncos started the second half strong, forcing another Eagles turnover on the second play of the third quarter. McNabb was intercepted by Champ Bailey, setting up a 33-yard field goal by Matt Prater to reduce the lead to 10. Philadelphia's next possession gave them their largest lead of the game after Donovan McNabb found Jason Avant for his third passing touchdown of the day. Kyle Orton was then intercepted by Asante Samuel, and the Broncos' hopes of a comeback were fading away. However, Denver forced a 3-and-out, scored on another passing touchdown to Jabar Gaffney, and recovered the fumble by Macho Harris on the following kickoff. Orton found Knowshon Moreno for his third passing touchdown of the day, and, within two minutes, the Eagles' 17-point lead was down to 3. In the fourth, Matt Prater succeeded on a 46-yard field goal attempt and the game was tied at 27 with just over 6 minutes to go. After offensive possessions for each team, both ending in punts, the Eagles got the ball back with 1:41 remaining to set up a 28-yard field goal by David Akers, leaving the Broncos with 7 seconds of game time. Time ran out on the ensuing kickoff, and the Eagles held on to win by a score of 30–27.

The victory, their sixth consecutive, boosted Philadelphia's record to 11–4. With the Dallas Cowboys winning their game against the Washington Redskins later that night, it set a de facto game between the two teams to decide the NFC East champion.

==== Week 17: at Dallas Cowboys ====
Philadelphia Eagles at Dallas Cowboys

Team	1	2	3	4	Total
Eagles	0	0	0	0	0
• Cowboys	7	10	7	0	24

- Location: Cowboys Stadium, Arlington, Texas
- Game start: 4:15 p.m. EST
- Game weather: Ron Winter
- TV announcers (Fox): Joe Buck, Troy Aikman, and Pam Oliver

In the final game of the regular season, the first-place Eagles battled the second-place Cowboys in Dallas, with the winner crowned as NFC East champs.

The game began with Dallas driving 80 yards down the field in 9 plays for the touchdown. Cowboys quarterback Tony Romo completed a 10-yard pass to tight end Jason Witten, giving the Cowboys the early 7–0 lead. The Eagles' first drive, in comparison, ended in a quick 3-and-out, giving the ball back to the Cowboys. On the next drive, Romo, looking for Patrick Crayton, was picked off by the Eagles' Joselio Hanson deep in Philadelphia territory. The Eagles, continuing their drive into the second quarter, were able to reach the Cowboys' 39-yard line, but elected to punt on 4th down rather than kick the long field goal. Tony Romo led Dallas back down the field and the possession finished with a 14-yard touchdown reception by Patrick Crayton. Still scoreless, the Eagles made a furious attempt to respond, moving the ball all the way to the 14-yard line of the Cowboys only for Donovan McNabb to fumble. Dallas DE Jay Ratliff scooped it up, eventually resulting in a 44-yard field goal by Shaun Suisham to end the half with a 17–0 Cowboys lead.

To open the second half, the Eagles drove down the field into field goal range and once again came up empty. The 53-yard try by David Akers was wide left, and the Cowboys took over on their own 43. Both teams each punted twice until the Cowboys struck again, this time on a 2-play possession capped off by running back Felix Jones. Jones ran it in from 49 yards out and put Dallas up by 24 with under 6 minutes left in the third quarter. This would be the last time either team put up any points, and the game ended with a final score of 24–0. This would be Philadelphia's first loss since Week 10 and their first time being held scoreless in a regular season game since Week 13 of 2005.

With the loss, the Eagles placed second in the NFC East, as the Cowboys won the division title by means of a tiebreaker. The loss also resulted in the Eagles failing to clinch the #2 seed (and a first-round bye) in the NFC and instead slipped all the way down to the #6 seed in the NFC, setting up a rematch on Wild Card weekend.

== Standings ==
=== Division ===
NFC East
	W	L	T	PCT	DIV	CONF	PF	PA	STK
^{(3)} Dallas Cowboys	11	5	0	.688	4–2	9–3	361	250	W3
^{(6)} Philadelphia Eagles	11	5	0	.688	4–2	9–3	429	337	L1
New York Giants	8	8	0	.500	4–2	6–6	402	427	L2
Washington Redskins	4	12	0	.250	0–6	2–10	266	336	L3

=== Conference ===
NFC
#	Team	Division	W	L	T	PCT	DIV	CONF	SOS	SOV	STK
Division leaders
1	New Orleans Saints	South	13	3	0	.813	4–2	9–3	.426	.418	L3
2	Minnesota Vikings	North	12	4	0	.750	5–1	9–3	.441	.411	W1
3 (Note: Dallas won the NFC East based on the head-to-head sweep over Philadelphia.)	Dallas Cowboys	East	11	5	0	.688	4–2	9–3	.488	.438	W3
4	Arizona Cardinals	West	10	6	0	.625	4–2	8–4	.445	.356	L1
Wild Cards
5 (Note: Green Bay clinched the NFC No. 5 seed over Philadelphia based on winning percentage vs. common opponents (4–1 versus 3–2 against Dallas, San Francisco, Chicago and Tampa Bay).)	Green Bay Packers	North	11	5	0	.688	4–2	9–3	.441	.381	W2
6	Philadelphia Eagles	East	11	5	0	.688	4–2	9–3	.484	.403	L1
Did not qualify for the postseason
7	Atlanta Falcons	South	9	7	0	.563	3–3	6–6	.504	.382	W3
8 (Note: Carolina, San Francisco and NY Giants are ranked based on conference record.)	Carolina Panthers	South	8	8	0	.500	4–2	8–4	.539	.484	W3
9	San Francisco 49ers	West	8	8	0	.500	5–1	7–5	.477	.336	W2
10	New York Giants	East	8	8	0	.500	4–2	6–6	.535	.398	L2
11	Chicago Bears	North	7	9	0	.438	3–3	5–7	.496	.321	W2
12	Seattle Seahawks	West	5	11	0	.313	3–3	4–8	.477	.238	L4
13	Washington Redskins	East	4	12	0	.250	0–6	2–10	.492	.266	L3
14	Tampa Bay Buccaneers	South	3	13	0	.188	1–5	3–9	.555	.604	L1
15	Detroit Lions	North	2	14	0	.125	0–6	1–11	.520	.281	L6
16	St. Louis Rams	West	1	15	0	.063	0–6	1–11	.520	.125	L8
Tiebreakers (Note: When breaking ties for three or more teams under the NFL's rules, they are first broken within divisions, then comparing only the highest-ranked remaining team from each division.)

== Postseason ==
=== Schedule ===
Round	Date	Opponent (seed)	Result	Record	Venue	Recap
Wild Card	January 9, 2010	at Dallas Cowboys (3)	L 14–34	0–1	Cowboys Stadium	Recap

=== Game summaries ===
==== NFC Wild Card Playoffs: at (3) Dallas Cowboys ====
NFC Wild Card Playoffs: (6) Philadelphia Eagles at (3) Dallas Cowboys – Game summary

Quarter	1	2	3	4	Total
Eagles	0	7	0	7	14
Cowboys	0	27	7	0	34

at Cowboys Stadium, Arlington, Texas

- Date: January 9
- Game time: 8:00 p.m. EST/7:00 p.m. CST
- Game weather: None (retractable roof closed)
- Game attendance: 92,951
- Referee: Ed Hochuli (85)
- TV announcers (NBC): Al Michaels (play-by-play), Cris Collinsworth (color commentator), and Andrea Kremer (sideline reporter)
- Recap, Game Book

Game information

First quarter

- No scoring plays.

Second quarter

- DAL – John Phillips 1-yard pass from Tony Romo (Shaun Suisham kick), 14:09. Cowboys 7–0. Drive: 4 plays, 55 yards, 2:16.
- PHI – Jeremy Maclin 76-yard pass from Michael Vick (David Akers kick), 13:19. Tied 7–7. Drive: 2 plays, 83 yards, 0:50.
- DAL – Tashard Choice 1-yard run (Shaun Suisham kick), 9:14. Cowboys 14–7. Drive: 10 plays, 85 yards, 4:05.
- DAL – Shaun Suisham 25-yard field goal, 3:39. Cowboys 17–7. Drive: 8 plays, 51 yards, 3:56.
- DAL – Miles Austin 6-yard pass from Tony Romo (Shaun Suisham kick), 1:55. Cowboys 24–7. Drive: 3 plays, 18 yards, 1:28.
- DAL – Shaun Suisham 48-yard field goal, 0:02. Cowboys 27–7. Drive: 7 plays, 28 yards, 0:49.

Third quarter

- DAL – Felix Jones 73-yard run (Shaun Suisham kick), 5:33. Cowboys 34–7. Drive: 4 plays, 89 yards, 2:22.

Fourth quarter

- PHI – DeSean Jackson 4-yard pass from Donovan McNabb (David Akers kick), 13:30. Cowboys 34–14. Drive: 9 plays, 89 yards, 3:23.

Top passers

- PHI – Donovan McNabb – 19/37, 230 yards, TD
- DAL – Tony Romo – 23/35, 244 yards, 2 TD

Top rushers

- PHI – LeSean McCoy – 21 rushes, 135 yards
- DAL – Felix Jones – 16 rushes, 148 yards, TD

Top receivers

- PHI – Jeremy Maclin – 7 receptions, 146 yards, TD
- DAL – Miles Austin – 7 receptions, 82 yards, TD

Entering the postseason as the NFC's #6 seed, the Eagles began their playoff at Cowboys Stadium for the third meeting against their hated rival, the #3 Dallas Cowboys, in a rematch of their Week 17 defeat.

After a scoreless first quarter, the Cowboys would strike first in the second quarter with quarterback Tony Romo's 1-yard touchdown pass to tight end John Phillips. Philadelphia would answer with quarterback Michael Vick hooking up with rookie wide receiver Jeremy Maclin on a 76-yard touchdown, but Dallas would start to pull away as running back Tashard Choice got a 1-yard touchdown run. The Cowboys would pile on their lead with kicker Shaun Suisham's 25-yard field goal, Romo's 6-yard touchdown pass to wide receiver Miles Austin, and Suisham's 48-yard field goal.

Dallas would add onto their lead in the third quarter as running back Felix Jones scored on a 73-yard touchdown run. The Eagles tried to mount a comeback drive in the fourth quarter as quarterback Donovan McNabb found wide receiver DeSean Jackson, but the Cowboys would prevent any further attempts.

With the loss, Philadelphia was eliminated, ending its season with an overall record of 11–6.

This would be Donovan McNabb's last game as an Eagle.

This was the first time since 1996 the Eagles failed to win their opening playoff game.
