= 2009 San Diego Chargers season =

NFL team 50th season

- Owner: Alex Spanos
- General manager: A. J. Smith
- Head coach: Norv Turner
- Offensive coordinator: Clarence Shelmon
- Defensive coordinator: Ron Rivera
- Home stadium: Qualcomm Stadium

Results
- Record: 13–3
- Division place: 1st AFC West
- Playoffs: Lost Divisional Playoffs (vs. Jets) 14–17
- All-Pros: 3: G Kris Dielman (2nd team); TE Antonio Gates (2nd team); K Nate Kaeding (1st team)
- Pro Bowlers: 6: G Kris Dielman; TE Antonio Gates; WR Vincent Jackson; K Nate Kaeding; ST Kassim Osgood; QB Philip Rivers

The 2009 season was the San Diego Chargers' 40th in the National Football League (NFL) and their 50th since becoming founding members of the American Football League. The Chargers improved upon their regular season record of 8–8 in 2008 and won their division for the fourth straight year and fifth time in six seasons. They finished the regular season with a 13–3 record, the second best winning percentage in franchise history but were upset in the Divisional Playoffs by the New York Jets. It was also Norv Turner's best regular season record as head coach. Also, this was the end of an era as future Hall of Fame running back LaDainian Tomlinson joined the New York Jets following the season, ending his 9-year tenure as a Charger. As of 2025, this is the most recent division title for the Los Angeles/San Diego Chargers franchise.

== 2009 NFL draft ==
Many had speculated as to who the Chargers would likely target early in the 2009 NFL draft. Commonly noted areas of need included the safety positions, the right side of the offensive line, and inside linebacker. The Chargers were also expected to be in the hunt for a running back to eventually replace Tomlinson, who, despite past excellence, had faced more frequent injuries and declining production as he aged.

2009 San Diego Chargers draft
Round	Pick	Player	Position	College	Notes
1	16	Larry English	OLB	NIU	
3	78	Louis Vasquez *	G	Texas Tech	
4	113	Vaughn Martin	NT	Western Ontario	
4	133	Tyronne Green	G	Auburn	
4	134	Gartrell Johnson	RB	Colorado State	
5	148	Brandon Hughes	CB	Oregon State	
6	189	Kevin Ellison	S	USC	
7	224	Demetrius Byrd	WR	LSU	
Made roster † Pro Football Hall of Fame * Made at least one Pro Bowl during career

== Staff ==
San Diego Chargers 2009 staff
Front office: Owner – Alex Spanos; President/CEO – Dean Spanos; Executive vice president – Michael Spanos; Executive vice president/executive officer – A. G. Spanos; Executive vice president/general manager – A. J. Smith; Executive vice president of football operations/assistant general manager – Ed McGuire; Senior executive – Randy Mueller; Director of player personnel – Jimmy Raye; Director of pro scouting – Dennis Abraham; Director of college scouting – John Spanos; Assistant director of college scouting – Mike Biehl; Head coaches: Head coach – Norv Turner; Assistant head coach/tight ends – Rob Chudzinski; Assistant to the Head Coach – Margie Smith; Offensive coaches: Offensive coordinator – Clarence Shelmon; Quarterbacks – John Ramsdell; Running backs – Ollie Wilson; Wide receivers – Charlie Joiner; Offensive line – Hal Hunter; Offensive line – Mike Sullivan; Offensive Assistant/Coaches’ Assistant – Steve Gera	Defensive coaches: Defensive coordinator – Ron Rivera; Defensive line – Don Johnson; Linebackers – John Pagano; Assistant linebackers – Greg Williams; Secondary – Steven Wilks; Assistant secondary – Cris Dishman; Special teams coaches: Special teams – Steve Crosby; Strength and conditioning: Strength and conditioning – Jeff Hurd; Assistant strength and conditioning – Vernon Stephens; Nutrition coordinator – Hal Hunter

== Final roster ==
2009 San Diego Chargers roster
Quarterbacks (QB): 17 Philip Rivers; 7 Billy Volek; 6 Charlie Whitehurst; Running backs (RB): 29 Michael Bennett; 22 Jacob Hester FB; 43 Darren Sproles; 35 Mike Tolbert FB; 21 LaDainian Tomlinson; Wide receivers (WR): 84 Craig Davis; 80 Malcom Floyd; 83 Vincent Jackson; 11 Legedu Naanee; 81 Kassim Osgood; Tight ends (TE): 85 Antonio Gates; 86 Brandon Manumaleuna; 88 Kris Wilson	Offensive linemen (OL): 68 Kris Dielman G; 62 Brandyn Dombrowski G; 77 Eric Ghiaciuc C; 69 Tyronne Green G; 61 Nick Hardwick C; 73 Marcus McNeill T; 64 Dennis Norman C; 79 Jon Runyan T; 65 Louis Vasquez G; Defensive linemen (DL): 70 Alfonso Boone DE; 93 Luis Castillo DE; 74 Jacques Cesaire DE; 71 Antonio Garay NT; 96 Travis Johnson DE; 92 Vaughn Martin DE; 98 Ian Scott NT	Linebackers (LB): 99 Kevin Burnett ILB; 54 Stephen Cooper ILB; 51 Tim Dobbins ILB; 52 Larry English OLB; 58 Marques Harris OLB; 53 James Holt ILB; 56 Shawne Merriman OLB; 95 Shaun Phillips OLB; 59 Brandon Siler ILB; Defensive backs (DB): 20 Antoine Cason CB; 31 Antonio Cromartie CB; 25 Kevin Ellison SS; 28 Steve Gregory FS; 24 Dante Hughes CB; 23 Quentin Jammer CB; 27 Paul Oliver SS; 41 C. J. Spillman FS; 32 Eric Weddle FS; Special teams (ST): 50 David Binn LS; 10 Nate Kaeding K; 5 Mike Scifres P	Practice squad: 12 Gary Banks WR; 46 Darry Beckwith LB; 26 Simeon Castille CB; 75 Corey Clark T; 78 Andre Coleman DE; 72 Derrick Jones DE; 34 Billy Latsko FB; 60 Ryan McDonald C (IR); 67 Joe Toledo T; Reserve: 90 Antwan Applewhite LB (IR); 97 Ryon Bingham DE (IR); 44 Curtis Brinkley RB (NF-Inj.); 82 Demetrius Byrd WR (IR); 66 Jeromey Clary T (IR); 36 Brandon Hughes CB (IR); 63 Scott Mruczkowski C (IR); 91 Ogemdi Nwagbuo NT (IR); 94 Jyles Tucker LB (IR); 76 Jamal Williams NT (IR); Rookies in italics 53 active, 10 reserve, 9 practice squad

== Preseason ==
Week	Date	Opponent	Result	Record	Venue	Recap
1	August 15	Seattle Seahawks	L 20–14	0–1	Qualcomm Stadium	Recap
2	August 22	at Arizona Cardinals	W 17–6	1–1	University of Phoenix Stadium	Recap
3	August 29	at Atlanta Falcons	L 27–24	1–2	Georgia Dome	Recap
4	September 4	San Francisco 49ers	W 26–7	2–2	Qualcomm Stadium	Recap

== Regular season ==
=== Schedule ===
Week	Date	Opponent	Result	Record	Venue	Recap
1	September 14	at **Oakland Raiders**	**W** 24–20	1–0	Oakland–Alameda County Coliseum	Recap
2	September 20	Baltimore Ravens	**L** 26–31	1–1	Qualcomm Stadium	Recap
3	September 27	Miami Dolphins	**W** 23–13	2–1	Qualcomm Stadium	Recap
4	October 4	at Pittsburgh Steelers	**L** 28–38	2–2	Heinz Field	Recap
5	Bye					
6	October 19	**Denver Broncos**	**L** 23–34	2–3	Qualcomm Stadium	Recap
7	October 25	at **Kansas City Chiefs**	**W** 37–7	3–3	Arrowhead Stadium	Recap
8	November 1	**Oakland Raiders**	**W** 24–16	4–3	Qualcomm Stadium	Recap
9	November 8	at New York Giants	**W** 21–20	5–3	Giants Stadium	Recap
10	November 15	Philadelphia Eagles	**W** 31–23	6–3	Qualcomm Stadium	Recap
11	November 22	at **Denver Broncos**	**W** 32–3	7–3	Invesco Field at Mile High	Recap
12	November 29	**Kansas City Chiefs**	**W** 43–14	8–3	Qualcomm Stadium	Recap
13	December 6	at Cleveland Browns	**W** 30–23	9–3	Cleveland Browns Stadium	Recap
14	December 13	at Dallas Cowboys	**W** 20–17	10–3	Cowboys Stadium	Recap
15	December 20	Cincinnati Bengals	**W** 27–24	11–3	Qualcomm Stadium	Recap
16	December 25	at Tennessee Titans	**W** 42–17	12–3	LP Field	Recap
17	January 3	Washington Redskins	**W** 23–20	13–3	Qualcomm Stadium	Recap

Note: Intra-division opponents are in bold text.

=== Game summaries ===
==== Week 1: at Oakland Raiders ====
Week 1: San Diego Chargers at Oakland Raiders

Quarter	1	2	3	4	Total
**Chargers**	0	10	0	14	**24**
Raiders	7	3	0	10	**20**

at Oakland–Alameda County Coliseum, Oakland, California

- Date: September 14
- Game time: 7:16 p.m. PDT
- Game weather: 63 °F (17 °C) (Clear)
- Game attendance: 61,940
- Referee: Carl Cheffers
- TV announcers (ESPN): Mike Greenberg (play-by-play), Mike Golic, Steve Young (color commentators) and Michele Tafoya (sideline reporter)
- Box score

Game information

**First quarter**

- OAK – Michael Bush 4-yard run (Sebastian Janikowski kick), 3:13. Raiders 7–0. **Drive: 10 plays, 84 yards, 6:10.**

**Second quarter**

- SDG – LaDainian Tomlinson 1-yard run (Nate Kaeding kick), 4:45. Tied 7–7. **Drive: 7 plays, 45 yards, 4:22.**
- OAK – Sebastian Janikowski 37-yard field goal, 0:40. Raiders 10–7. **Drive: 11 plays, 45 yards, 1:43.**
- SDG – Nate Kaeding 47-yard field goal, 0:00. Tied 10–10. **Drive: 5 plays, 12 yards, 0:40.**

**Third quarter**

- No scoring plays.

**Fourth quarter**

- OAK – Sebastian Janikowski 35-yard field goal, 13:01. Raiders 13–10. **Drive: 7 plays, 51 yards, 3:43.**
- SDG – Vincent Jackson 15-yard pass from Philip Rivers (Nate Kaeding kick), 7:22. Chargers 17–13. **Drive: 10 plays, 77 yards, 5:39.**
- OAK – Louis Murphy 57-yard pass from JaMarcus Russell (Sebastian Janikowski kick), 2:34. Raiders 20–17. **Drive: 9 plays, 71 yards, 4:48.**
- SDG – Darren Sproles 5-yard run (Nate Kaeding kick), 0:18. Chargers 24–20. **Drive: 9 plays, 89 yards, 2:16.**

**Top passers**

- SDG – Philip Rivers – 24/36, 252 yards, TD, INT
- OAK – JaMarcus Russell – 12/30, 208 yards, TD, 2 INT

**Top rushers**

- SDG – LaDainian Tomlinson – 13 rushes, 55 yards, TD
- OAK – Darren McFadden – 17 rushes, 68 yards

**Top receivers**

- SDG – Antonio Gates – 5 receptions, 83 yards
- OAK – Zach Miller – 6 receptions, 96 yards

The Chargers began their season at Oakland–Alameda County Coliseum for a Week 1 AFL Legacy duel with their AFC West rival, the Oakland Raiders, in the second game of an MNF doubleheader. In the first quarter, San Diego trailed early as Raiders running back Michael Bush got a 4-yard touchdown run. The Chargers would strike back in the second quarter as running back LaDainian Tomlinson got a 1-yard touchdown run. Oakland would respond with kicker Sebastian Janikowski getting a 37-yard field goal. San Diego would close out the half with kicker Nate Kaeding making a 47-yard field goal.

After a scoreless third quarter, the Raiders would retake the lead in the fourth quarter as Janikowski nailed a 35-yard field goal. The Chargers would take the lead as quarterback Philip Rivers completed a 15-yard touchdown pass to wide receiver Vincent Jackson. Oakland would respond with quarterback JaMarcus Russell completing a 57-yard touchdown pass to wide receiver Louis Murphy, but San Diego came right back with a 5-yard touchdown run by running back Darren Sproles.

With the win, the Chargers began their season at 1–0.

==== Week 2: vs. Baltimore Ravens ====
Week 2: Baltimore Ravens at San Diego Chargers

Quarter	1	2	3	4	Total
**Ravens**	7	14	7	3	**31**
Chargers	10	6	7	3	**26**

at Qualcomm Stadium, San Diego, California

- Date: September 20
- Game time: 1:15 p.m. PDT
- Game weather: 83 °F (28 °C) (Sunny)
- Game attendance: 66,882
- Referee: Tony Corrente
- TV announcers (CBS): Dick Enberg & Dan Fouts
- Box score

Game information

**First quarter**

- SDG – Darren Sproles 81-yard pass from Philip Rivers (Nate Kaeding kick), 9:18. Chargers 7–0. **Drive: 6 plays, 99 yards, 2:22.**
- BAL – Willis McGahee 5-yard run (Stephen Hauschka kick), 4:49. Tied 7–7. **Drive: 9 plays, 68 yards, 4:29.**
- SDG – Nate Kaeding 29-yard field goal, 0:44. Chargers 10–7. **Drive: 7 plays, 56 yards, 4:05.**

**Second quarter**

- BAL – Willis McGahee 3-yard run (Stephen Hauschka kick), 10:50. Ravens 14–10. **Drive: 11 plays, 78 yards, 4:54.**
- SDG – Nate Kaeding 22-yard field goal, 3:00. Ravens 14–13. **Drive: 8 plays, 58 yards, 3:34.**
- BAL – Kelley Washington 27-yard pass from Joe Flacco (Stephen Hauschka kick), 1:38. Ravens 21–13. **Drive: 5 plays, 75 yards, 1:22.**
- SDG – Nate Kaeding 23-yard field goal, 0:08. Ravens 21–16. **Drive: 9 plays, 37 yards, 1:30.**

**Third quarter**

- BAL – Todd Heap 9-yard pass from Joe Flacco (Stephen Hauschka kick), 8:24. Ravens 28–16. **Drive: 4 plays, 22 yards, 1:42.**
- SDG – Vincent Jackson 35-yard pass from Philip Rivers (Nate Kaeding kick), 2:26. Ravens 28–23. **Drive: 9 plays, 60 yards, 5:58.**

**Fourth quarter**

- SDG – Nate Kaeding 25-yard field goal, 7:11. Ravens 28–23. **Drive: 9 plays, 49 yards, 4:04.**
- BAL – Stephen Hauschka 33-yard field goal, 2:54. Ravens 31–23. **Drive: 4 plays, -2 yards, 1:34.**

**Top passers**

- BAL – Joe Flacco – 17/26, 190 yards, 2 TD, INT
- SDG – Philip Rivers – 25/45, 436 yards, 2 TD, 2 INT

**Top rushers**

- BAL – Willis McGahee – 15 rushes, 79 yards, 2 TD
- SDG – Darren Sproles – 10 rushes, 26 yards

**Top receivers**

- BAL – Kelley Washington – 4 receptions, 58 yards, TD
- SDG – Vincent Jackson – 6 receptions, 141 yards, TD

Coming off their road win over the Raiders, the Chargers would play their Week 2 home opener against the Baltimore Ravens. San Diego would deliver the opening strike in the first quarter as quarterback Philip Rivers completed an 81-yard touchdown pass to running back Darren Sproles. The Ravens would respond with running back Willis McGahee getting a 5-yard touchdown run, yet the Chargers would regain the lead as kicker Nate Kaeding got a 29-yard field goal. Baltimore would take the lead in the second quarter as McGahee got a 3-yard touchdown run. San Diego would pull within one as Kaeding made a 22-yard field goal, but the Ravens answered with quarterback Joe Flacco completing a 27-yard touchdown pass to wide receiver Kelley Washington. The Chargers would end the half as Kaeding would make a 23-yard field goal.

In the third quarter, Baltimore would add onto their lead as Flacco completed a 9-yard touchdown pass to tight end Todd Heap. San Diego would stay close as Rivers completed a 35-yard touchdown pass to wide receiver Vincent Jackson. In the fourth quarter, the Chargers got closer as Kaeding kicked a 25-yard field goal, but the Ravens would answer with kicker Steve Hauschka nailing a 33-yard field goal. San Diego would manage to get a late drive all the way to the Ravens' 15-yard line, but on 4th-&-2, Sproles was tackled behind the line of scrimmage by an unblocked Ray Lewis, ending any hope of a comeback.

With the loss, the Chargers fell to 1–1.

==== Week 3: vs. Miami Dolphins ====
Week 3: Miami Dolphins at San Diego Chargers

Quarter	1	2	3	4	Total
Dolphins	0	3	3	7	**13**
**Chargers**	0	3	7	13	**23**

at Qualcomm Stadium, San Diego, California

- Date: September 27
- Game time: 1:15 p.m. PDT
- Game weather: 80 °F (27 °C) (Sunny)
- Game attendance: 67,230
- Referee: Bill Leavy
- TV announcers (CBS): Dick Enberg & Dan Fouts
- Box score

Game information

**First quarter**

- No scoring plays.

**Second quarter**

- SDG – Nate Kaeding 25-yard field goal, 9:21. Chargers 3–0. **Drive: 14 plays, 72 yards, 6:58.**
- MIA – Dan Carpenter 24-yard field goal, 3:26. Tied 3–3. **Drive: 6 plays, 11 yards, 3:29.**

**Third quarter**

- MIA – Dan Carpenter 23-yard field goal, 4:09. Dolphins 6–3. **Drive: 12 plays, 44 yards, 7:03.**
- SDG – Philip Rivers 5-yard run (Nate Kaeding kick), 2:02. Chargers 10–6. **Drive: 5 plays, 75 yards, 2:07.**

**Fourth quarter**

- SDG – Nate Kaeding 23-yard field goal, 12:30. Chargers 13–6. **Drive: 5 plays, 63 yards, 2:16.**
- SDG – Nate Kaeding 26-yard field goal, 6:53. Chargers 16–6. **Drive: 11 plays, 41 yards, 4:58.**
- SDG – Eric Weddle 31-yard interception return (Nate Kaeding kick), 5:45. Chargers 23–6.
- MIA – Ricky Williams 14-yard run (Dan Carpenter kick), 2:51. Chargers 23–13. **Drive: 10 plays, 76 yards, 2:54.**

**Top passers**

- MIA – Chad Henne – 10/19, 92 yards, INT
- SDG – Philip Rivers – 18/33, 303 yards

**Top rushers**

- MIA – Ronnie Brown – 18 rushes, 75 yards
- SDG – Darren Sproles – 18 rushes, 41 yards

**Top receivers**

- MIA – Davone Bess – 7 receptions, 54 yards
- SDG – Vincent Jackson – 5 receptions, 120 yards

Hoping to rebound from their tough loss to the Ravens, the Chargers stayed at home for a Week 3 duel with the Miami Dolphins. After a 1-yard fumble recovery for a touchdown by the Dolphins, San Diego would strike in the second quarter with a 25-yard field goal from kicker Nate Kaeding. The Dolphins would answer with a 24-yard field goal from kicker Dan Carpenter. In the third quarter, Miami extended the lead with Carpenter's 23-yard field goal. Afterwards, the Chargers struck back with quarterback Philip Rivers' 5-yard touchdown run. San Diego would then pull away in the fourth quarter with Kaeding nailing a 23-yard and a 26-yard field goal, followed by safety Eric Weddle returning an interception 31 yards for a touchdown. The Dolphins tried to rally with running back Ricky Williams' 14-yard touchdown run, yet the 'Bolts would hold on for the victory.

With the win, the Chargers improved to 2–1.

==== Week 4: at Pittsburgh Steelers ====
Week 4: San Diego Chargers at Pittsburgh Steelers

Quarter	1	2	3	4	Total
Chargers	0	0	7	21	**28**
**Steelers**	14	7	7	10	**38**

at Heinz Field, Pittsburgh, Pennsylvania

- Date: October 4
- Game time: 8:30 p.m. EDT
- Game weather: 54 °F (12 °C) (Cloudy)
- Game attendance: 64,045
- Referee: Jeff Triplette
- TV announcers (NBC): Al Michaels, Cris Collinsworth, & Andrea Kremer
- Box score

Game information

**First quarter**

- PIT – Rashard Mendenhall 1-yard run (Jeff Reed kick), 11:49. Steelers 7–0. **Drive: 6 plays, 79 yards, 3:11.**
- PIT – Mewelde Moore 19-yard pass from Ben Roethlisberger (Jeff Reed kick), 4:08. Steelers 14–0. **Drive: 11 plays, 75 yards, 6:27.**

**Second quarter**

- PIT – Rashard Mendenhall 2-yard run (Jeff Reed kick), 1:28. Steelers 21–0. **Drive: 13 plays, 79 yards, 6:07.**

**Third quarter**

- PIT – Heath Miller 6-yard pass from Ben Roethlisberger (Jeff Reed kick), 7:48. Steelers 28–0. **Drive: 8 plays, 81 yards, 5:01.**
- SDG – Antonio Gates 3-yard pass from Philip Rivers (Nate Kaeding kick), 1:33. Steelers 28–7. **Drive: 13 plays, 79 yards, 6:15.**

**Fourth quarter**

- SDG – Jacob Hester 41-yard fumble return (Nate Kaeding kick), 12:37. Steelers 28–14.
- PIT – Heath Miller 6-yard pass from Mewelde Moore (Jeff Reed kick), 7:18. Steelers 35–14. **Drive: 8 plays, 70 yards, 5:19.**
- SDG – Antonio Gates 30-yard pass from Philip Rivers (Nate Kaeding kick), 5:48. Steelers 35–21. **Drive: 4 plays, 67 yards, 1:30.**
- SDG – Chris Chambers 13-yard pass from Philip Rivers (Nate Kaeding kick), 4:31. Steelers 35–28. **Drive: 3 plays, 54 yards, 1:17.**
- PIT – Jeff Reed 46-yard field goal, 0:43. Steelers 38–28. **Drive: 10 plays, 51 yards, 3:48.**

**Top passers**

- SDG – Philip Rivers – 21/36, 254 yards, 3 TD
- PIT – Ben Roethlisberger – 26/33, 333 yards, 2 TD

**Top rushers**

- SDG – LaDainian Tomlinson – 7 rushes, 15 yards
- PIT – Rashard Mendenhall – 29 rushes, 165 yards, 2 TD

**Top receivers**

- SDG – Antonio Gates – 9 receptions, 124 yards, 2 TD
- PIT – Hines Ward – 8 receptions, 113 yards

Coming off their home win over the Dolphins, the Chargers flew to Heinz Field for a Week 4 Sunday night duel with the defending Super Bowl champion Pittsburgh Steelers. San Diego found themselves in a huge deficit in the first half. In the first quarter, the Steelers opened the game with running back Rashard Mendenhall getting a 1-yard touchdown run and quarterback Ben Roethlisberger completing a 19-yard touchdown pass to running back Mewelde Moore. Pittsburgh would increase their lead in the second quarter with Mendenhall's 2-yard touchdown run.

In the third quarter, the Steelers continued to roll as Roethlisberger found tight end Heath Miller on a 6-yard touchdown pass. San Diego would strike back as quarterback Philip Rivers threw a 3-yard touchdown pass to tight end Antonio Gates. In the fourth quarter, the Chargers began to catch up with a key play on special teams as fullback Jacob Hester stripped Stefan Logan of the ball and returned it 41 yards for a touchdown. Pittsburgh would answer with Roethlisberger's 6-yard touchdown pass to Miller. Afterwards, San Diego continued its comeback run as Rivers completed a 30-yard touchdown pass to Gates and a 13-yard touchdown pass to wide receiver Chris Chambers. However, the Steelers came right back with a 46-yard field goal from kicker Jeff Reed. The Bolts tried to cap off their rally, but a sack and fumble by linebacker James Harrison led to a Pittsburgh recovery, effectively ending any hope of a comeback.

With the loss, the Chargers fell to 2–2.

==== Week 6: vs. Denver Broncos ====
Week 6: Denver Broncos at San Diego Chargers

Quarter	1	2	3	4	Total
**Broncos**	7	10	7	10	**34**
Chargers	10	10	3	0	**23**

at Qualcomm Stadium, San Diego, California

- Date: October 19
- Game time: 5:40 p.m. PDT
- Game weather: 68 °F (20 °C) (Clear Skies)
- Game attendance: 68,615
- Referee: Scott Green
- TV announcers (ESPN): Mike Tirico, Ron Jaworski, Jon Gruden & Michele Tafoya
- Box score

Game information

**First quarter**

- SDG – Nate Kaeding 20-yard field goal, 4:51. Chargers 3–0. **Drive: 11 plays, 92 yards, 5:58.**
- DEN – Eddie Royal 93-yard kickoff return (Matt Prater kick), 4:39. Broncos 7–3. **Drive: 0 plays, 0 yards, 0:12.**
- SDG – Vincent Jackson 3-yard pass from Philip Rivers (Nate Kaeding kick), 0:06. Chargers 10–7. **Drive: 8 plays, 74 yards, 4:33.**

**Second quarter**

- DEN – Matt Prater 34-yard field goal, 7:55. Tied 10–10. **Drive: 13 plays, 62 yards, 7:11.**
- DEN – Eddie Royal 71-yard punt return (Matt Prater kick), 5:53. Broncos 17–10.
- SDG – Nate Kaeding 44-yard field goal, 2:19. Broncos 17–13. **Drive: 8 plays, 45 yards, 3:34.**
- SDG – Darren Sproles 77-yard punt return (Nate Kaeding kick), 1:03. Chargers 20–17.

**Third quarter**

- SDG – Nate Kaeding 50-yard field goal, 7:57. Chargers 23–17. **Drive: 9 plays, 48 yards, 4:37.**
- DEN – Tony Scheffler 19-yard pass from Kyle Orton (Matt Prater kick), 3:43. Broncos 24–23. **Drive: 9 plays, 77 yards, 4:14.**

**Fourth quarter**

- DEN – Matt Prater 29-yard field goal, 13:05. Broncos 27–23. **Drive: 10 plays, 36 yards, 3:38.**
- DEN – Brandon Stokley 5-yard pass from Kyle Orton (Matt Prater kick), 2:55. Broncos 34–23. **Drive: 5 plays, 62 yards, 2:45.**

**Top passers**

- DEN – Kyle Orton – 20/29, 229 yards, 2 TD
- SDG – Philip Rivers – 20/33, 274 yards, TD

**Top rushers**

- DEN – Correll Buckhalter – 10 rushes, 46 yards
- SDG – LaDainian Tomlinson – 18 rushes, 70 yards

**Top receivers**

- DEN – Tony Scheffler – 6 receptions, 101 yards, TD
- SDG – Antonio Gates – 5 receptions, 70 yards

Coming off their bye week, the Chargers went home, donned their throwback uniforms, and played a Week 6 AFL Legacy duel with the Denver Broncos on Monday night. In the first quarter, San Diego struck first with kicker Nate Kaeding getting a 20-yard field goal. The Broncos would immediately respond as wide receiver Eddie Royal returned a kickoff 93 yards for a touchdown, yet the Chargers came back with quarterback Philip Rivers completing a 3-yard touchdown pass to wide receiver Vincent Jackson. Denver would take the lead in the second quarter with a 34-yard field goal from kicker Matt Prater and Royal returning a punt 71 yards for a touchdown. Afterwards, San Diego closed out the half with a Kaeding 44-yard field goal and running back Darren Sproles' 77-yard punt return for a touchdown.

In the third quarter, the Chargers would add onto their lead with Kaeding nailing a 50-yard field goal. However, the Broncos would take the lead with quarterback Kyle Orton's 19-yard touchdown pass to tight end Tony Scheffler. In the fourth quarter, Denver would increase their lead with Prater's 29-yard field goal and Orton finding wide receiver Brandon Stokley on a 5-yard touchdown pass. San Diego tried to rally, but the Broncos' defense stood strong and held for the win.

With the loss, the Chargers fell to 2–3. This is also their third straight season where the team has started 2–3 after five games.

==== Week 7: at Kansas City Chiefs ====
Week 7: San Diego Chargers at Kansas City Chiefs

Quarter	1	2	3	4	Total
**Chargers**	14	6	7	10	**37**
Chiefs	0	0	7	0	**7**

at Arrowhead Stadium, Kansas City, Missouri

- Date: October 25
- Game time: 12:00 p.m. CDT
- Game weather: 58 °F (14 °C) (Overcast)
- Game attendance: 69,337
- Referee: Pete Morelli
- TV announcers (CBS): Dick Enberg & Dan Fouts
- Box score

Game information

**First quarter**

- SDG – Malcom Floyd 3-yard pass from Philip Rivers (Nate Kaeding kick), 7:32. Chargers 7–0. **Drive: 10 plays, 80 yards, 5:00.**
- SDG – Vincent Jackson 10-yard pass from Philip Rivers (Nate Kaeding kick), 1:23. Chargers 14–0. **Drive: 8 plays, 41 yards, 3:32.**

**Second quarter**

- SDG – Nate Kaeding 20-yard field goal, 9:49. Chargers 17–0. **Drive: 10 plays, 82 yards, 5:27.**
- SDG – Nate Kaeding 39-yard field goal, 0:01. Chargers 20–0. **Drive: 7 plays, 45 yards, 1:06.**

**Third quarter**

- KAN – Dwayne Bowe 7-yard pass from Matt Cassel (Ryan Succop kick), 9:48. Chargers 20–7. **Drive: 10 plays, 65 yards, 5:12.**
- SDG – Darren Sproles 58-yard pass from Philip Rivers (Nate Kaeding kick), 5:45. Chargers 27–7. **Drive: 3 plays, 64 yards, 1:26.**

**Fourth quarter**

- SDG – Nate Kaeding 19-yard field goal, 11:37. Chargers 30–7. **Drive: 6 plays, 17 yards, 2:36.**
- SDG – Jacob Hester blocked punt recovery in end zone (Nate Kaeding kick), 9:13. Chargers 37–7.

**Top passers**

- SDG – Philip Rivers – 18/30, 268 yards, 3 TD
- KAN – Matt Cassel – 10/25, 97 yards, TD, 3 INT

**Top rushers**

- SDG – LaDainian Tomlinson – 23 rushes, 71 yards
- KAN – Larry Johnson – 16 rushes, 49 yards

**Top receivers**

- SDG – Vincent Jackson – 5 receptions, 142 yards, TD
- KAN – Bobby Wade – 4 receptions, 66 yards

Hoping to rebound from their home loss to the Broncos, the Chargers flew to Arrowhead Stadium, donned their throwbacks, and played a Week 7 AFL Legacy game with the Kansas City Chiefs. In the first quarter, San Diego struck first with quarterback Philip Rivers competing a 3-yard touchdown pass to wide receiver Malcom Floyd and a 10-yard touchdown pass to wide receiver Vincent Jackson. The Chargers would continue their dominance in the second quarter as kicker Nate Kaeding nailed a 20-yard and a 39-yard field goal.

The Chiefs would get on the board in the third quarter with quarterback Matt Cassel completing a 7-yard touchdown pass to wide receiver Dwayne Bowe, yet San Diego came right back with Rivers hooking up with running back Darren Sproles on a 58-yard touchdown pass. Afterwards, the Chargers would wrap up the game in the fourth quarter with Kaeding booting a 19-yard field goal and fullback Jacob Hester recovering a blocked punt in the end zone for a touchdown.

With the win, San Diego improved to 3–3.

==== Week 8: vs. Oakland Raiders ====
Week 8: Oakland Raiders at San Diego Chargers

Quarter	1	2	3	4	Total
Raiders	0	10	3	3	**16**
**Chargers**	7	14	0	3	**24**

at Qualcomm Stadium, San Diego, California

- Date: November 1
- Game time: 1:05 p.m. PST
- Game weather: 78 °F (26 °C) (Sunny)
- Game attendance: 67,016
- Referee: Terry McAulay
- TV announcers (CBS): Dick Enberg & Dan Fouts
- Box score

Game information

**First quarter**

- SDG – LaDainian Tomlinson 6-yard run (Nate Kaeding kick), 11:13. Chargers 7–0. **Drive: 2 plays, 59 yards, 0:55.**

**Second quarter**

- OAK – Justin Fargas 3-yard run (Sebastian Janikowski kick), 13:40. Tied 7–7. **Drive: 7 plays, 27 yards, 3:35.**
- SDG – Vincent Jackson 8-yard pass from Philip Rivers (Nate Kaeding kick), 6:09. Chargers 14–7. **Drive: 12 plays, 78 yards, 7:31.**
- SDG – LaDainian Tomlinson 10-yard run (Nate Kaeding kick), 0:54. Chargers 21–7. **Drive: 8 plays, 80 yards, 3:34.**
- OAK – Sebastian Janikowski 48-yard field goal, 0:11. Chargers 21–10. **Drive: 4 plays, 7 yards, 0:43.**

**Third quarter**

- OAK – Sebastian Janikowski 41-yard field goal, 9:09. Chargers 21–13. **Drive: 8 plays, 29 yards, 4:24.**

**Fourth quarter**

- OAK – Sebastian Janikowski 28-yard field goal, 12:39. Chargers 21–16. **Drive: 11 plays, 43 yards, 6:25.**
- SDG – Nate Kaeding 28-yard field goal, 4:43. Chargers 24–16. **Drive: 15 plays, 83 yards, 7:56.**

**Top passers**

- OAK – JaMarcus Russell – 14/22, 109 yards, INT
- SDG – Philip Rivers – 16/25, 249 yards, TD, INT

**Top rushers**

- OAK – Justin Fargas – 18 rushes, 59 yards, TD
- SDG – LaDainian Tomlinson – 18 rushes, 56 yards, 2 TD

**Top receivers**

- OAK – Zach Miller – 5 receptions, 52 yards
- SDG – Vincent Jackson – 8 receptions, 103 yards, TD

Coming off their road win over the Chiefs, the Chargers went home, donned their alternate uniforms, and played a Week 8 divisional rematch with the Oakland Raiders. In the first quarter, San Diego struck first as running back LaDainian Tomlinson got a 6-yard touchdown run. The Raiders would answer in the second quarter with a 3-yard touchdown run by running back Justin Fargas, yet the Chargers stormed on as quarterback Philip Rivers hooked up wide receiver Vincent Jackson on an 8-yard touchdown pass, followed by Tomlinson getting a 10-yard touchdown run. Oakland would close out the half with a 48-yard field goal by kicker Sebastian Janikowski.

In the second half, the Raiders would slowly try to rally as Janikowski nailed a 41-yard field goal in the third quarter and a 41-yard field goal in the fourth. Afterwards, San Diego pulled away as kicker Nate Kaeding booted a 28-yard field goal.

With their 13th-straight win over Oakland, the Chargers improved to 4–3.

==== Week 9: at New York Giants ====
Week 9: San Diego Chargers at New York Giants

Quarter	1	2	3	4	Total
**Chargers**	0	7	7	7	**21**
Giants	0	7	0	13	**20**

at Giants Stadium, East Rutherford, New Jersey

- Date: November 8
- Game time: 4:15 p.m. EST
- Game weather: 71 °F (22 °C) (Sunny)
- Game attendance: 78,774
- Referee: Walt Anderson
- TV announcers (CBS): Jim Nantz & Phil Simms
- Box score

Game information

**First quarter**

- No scoring plays.

**Second quarter**

- SDG – Vincent Jackson 10-yard pass from Philip Rivers (Nate Kaeding kick), 14:55. Chargers 7–0. **Drive: 6 plays, 45 yards, 3:04.**
- NYG – Steve Smith 6-yard pass from Eli Manning (Lawrence Tynes kick), 4:20. Tied 7–7. **Drive: 16 plays, 76 yards, 10:35.**

**Third quarter**

- SDG – Kris Wilson 2-yard pass from Philip Rivers (Nate Kaeding kick), 3:51. Chargers 14–7. **Drive: 6 plays, 51 yards, 3:03.**

**Fourth quarter**

- NYG – Lawrence Tynes 38-yard field goal, 14:09. Chargers 14–10. **Drive: 10 plays, 60 yards, 4:42.**
- NYG – Kevin Boss 8-yard pass from Eli Manning (Lawrence Tynes kick), 8:58. Giants 17–14. **Drive: 6 plays, 39 yards, 3:25.**
- NYG – Lawrence Tynes 22-yard field goal, 2:07. Giants 20–14. **Drive: 4 plays, 0 yards, 1:07.**
- SDG – Vincent Jackson 18-yard pass from Philip Rivers (Nate Kaeding kick), 0:21. Chargers 21–20. **Drive: 8 plays, 80 yards, 1:46.**

**Top passers**

- SDG – Philip Rivers – 24/36, 209 yards, 3 TD, 2 INT
- NYG – Eli Manning – 25/33, 215 yards, 2 TD

**Top rushers**

- SDG – LaDainian Tomlinson – 12 rushes, 22 yards
- NYG – Brandon Jacobs – 11 rushes, 67 yards

**Top receivers**

- SDG – Antonio Gates – 5 receptions, 67 yards
- NYG – Steve Smith – 8 receptions, 57 yards, TD

Coming off their divisional home win over the Raiders, the Chargers flew to Giants Stadium for a Week 9 interconference duel with the New York Giants in the much-hyped first-ever meeting between quarterbacks Philip Rivers & Eli Manning (Drew Brees started for the Chargers when the teams met in 2005).

After a scoreless first quarter, San Diego would deliver the opening strike of the second quarter as Rivers completed a 10-yard touchdown pass to wide receiver Vincent Jackson. The Giants would answer with Manning completing a 6-yard touchdown pass to wide receiver Steve Smith. In the third quarter, the Chargers regained the lead as Rivers found tight end Kris Wilson on a 1-yard touchdown pass. New York would take the lead in the fourth quarter as kicker Lawrence Tynes nailed a 38-yard field goal, Manning hooked up with tight end Kevin Boss on an 8-yard touchdown pass, and Tynes booted a 22-yard field goal. San Diego came right back as Rivers threw the game-winning 18-yard touchdown pass to Jackson.

With the win, the Chargers improved to 5–3 and kept their winning streak going by 3 games.

==== Week 10: vs. Philadelphia Eagles ====
Week 10: Philadelphia Eagles at San Diego Chargers

Quarter	1	2	3	4	Total
Eagles	0	6	3	14	**23**
**Chargers**	7	7	14	3	**31**

at Qualcomm Stadium, San Diego, California

- Date: November 15
- Game time: 1:15 p.m. PST
- Game weather: 71 °F (22 °C) (Sunny)
- Game attendance: 68,879
- Referee: Jerome Boger
- TV announcers (Fox): Thom Brennaman, Brian Billick & Charissa Thompson
- Box score

Game information

**First quarter**

- SDG – Mike Tolbert 20-yard pass from Philip Rivers (Nate Kaeding kick), 7:52. Chargers 7–0. **Drive: 6 plays, 40 yards, 2:09.**

**Second quarter**

- SDG – LaDainian Tomlinson 3-yard run (Nate Kaeding kick), 11:01. Chargers 14–0. **Drive: 10 plays, 82 yards, 5:44.**
- PHI – David Akers 18-yard field goal, 6:38. Chargers 14–3. **Drive: 9 plays, 77 yards, 4:23.**
- PHI – David Akers 25-yard field goal, 0:08. Chargers 14–6. **Drive: 14 plays, 87 yards, 4:16.**

**Third quarter**

- SDG – LaDainian Tomlinson 20-yard run (Nate Kaeding kick), 8:01. Chargers 21–6. **Drive: 5 plays, 76 yards, 2:23.**
- PHI – David Akers 25-yard field goal, 5:51. Chargers 21–9. **Drive: 6 plays, 77 yards, 2:10.**
- SDG – Legedu Naanee 20-yard pass from Philip Rivers (Nate Kaeding kick), 1:13. Chargers 28–9. **Drive: 8 plays, 59 yards, 4:38.**

**Fourth quarter**

- PHI – Jeremy Maclin 5-yard pass from Donovan McNabb (David Akers kick), 14:12. Chargers 28–16. **Drive: 9 plays, 54 yards, 2:01.**
- PHI – Brent Celek 6-yard pass from Donovan McNabb (David Akers kick), 7:12. Chargers 28–23. **Drive: 12 plays, 77 yards, 5:07.**
- SDG – Nate Kaeding 29-yard field goal, 0:30. Chargers 31–23. **Drive: 12 plays, 66 yards, 6:42.**

**Top passers**

- PHI – Donovan McNabb – 35/55, 450 yards, 2 TD, INT
- SDG – Philip Rivers – 20/25, 231 yards, 2 TD

**Top rushers**

- PHI – Brian Westbrook – 6 rushes, 28 yards
- SDG – LaDainian Tomlinson – 24 rushes, 96 yards, 2 TD

**Top receivers**

- PHI – Jason Avant – 8 receptions, 156 yards
- SDG – Antonio Gates – 7 receptions, 78 yards

Coming off their road win against the Giants, the Chargers went home for an interconference Duel with the Philadelphia Eagles. In the first quarter, the Chargers took the early lead as quarterback Philip Rivers got a 20-yard touchdown pass to fullback Mike Tolbert. In the second quarter, San Diego increased their lead as running back LaDainian Tomlinson got a 3-yard touchdown run. The Eagles would close out the half as David Akers kicked an 18-yard field goal and a 25-yard field goal.

In the third quarter, San Diego increased their lead as Tomlinson made a 20-yard touchdown run. Philadelphia tried to come back as Akers nailed another 25-yard field goal, but the Chargers increased their lead even further as Rivers hooked up with wide receiver Legedu Naanee on a 20-yard touchdown pass. For the fourth quarter, the Eagles tried to close the margin as quarterback Donovan McNabb passed to wide receiver Jeremy Maclin on a 5-yard touchdown pass, followed by a 6-yard touchdown pass to tight end Brent Celek, yet the Chargers hung on for the victory when kicker Nate Kaeding got a 29-yard field goal.

With the win, the Chargers improved to 6–3 and their winning streak to 4 games.

LaDainian Tomlinson (24 carries, 96 yards, 2 TDs) would surpass Marcus Allen for third place in the NFL's All-Time career touchdown leaders with 146.

==== Week 11: at Denver Broncos ====
Week 11: San Diego Chargers at Denver Broncos

Quarter	1	2	3	4	Total
**Chargers**	7	6	7	12	**32**
Broncos	0	0	3	0	**3**

at Invesco Field at Mile High, Denver, Colorado

- Date: November 22
- Game time: 2:15 p.m. MST
- Game weather: 51 °F (11 °C) (Sunny)
- Game attendance: 74,707
- Referee: Ron Winter
- TV announcers (CBS): Dick Enberg & Dan Fouts
- Box score

Game information

**First quarter**

- SDG – Legedu Naanee 2-yard pass from Philip Rivers (Nate Kaeding kick), 5:58. Chargers 7–0. **Drive: 9 plays, 69 yards, 4:37.**

**Second quarter**

- SDG – Nate Kaeding 28-yard field goal, 10:54. Chargers 10–0. **Drive: 11 plays, 46 yards, 7:14.**
- SDG – Nate Kaeding 47-yard field goal, 4:19. Chargers 13–0. **Drive: 9 plays, 44 yards, 5:33.**

**Third quarter**

- DEN – Matt Prater 23-yard field goal, 9:56. Chargers 13–3. **Drive: 9 plays, 59 yards, 3:58.**
- SDG – LaDainian Tomlinson 1-yard run (Nate Kaeding kick), 6:47. Chargers 20–3. **Drive: 6 plays, 41 yards, 3:09.**

**Fourth quarter**

- SDG – Nate Kaeding 28-yard field goal, 14:06. Chargers 23–3. **Drive: 9 plays, 50 yards, 4:45.**
- SDG – Nate Kaeding 19-yard field goal, 10:28. Chargers 26–3. **Drive: 6 plays, 51 yards, 2:54.**
- SDG – Mike Tolbert 8-yard run (kick failed), 0:34. Chargers 32–3. **Drive: 6 plays, 28 yards, 2:55.**

**Top passers**

- SDG – Philip Rivers – 17/22, 145 yards, TD
- DEN – Kyle Orton – 15/29, 171 yards, INT

**Top rushers**

- SDG – LaDainian Tomlinson – 20 rushes, 73 yards, TD
- DEN – Knowshon Moreno – 10 rushes, 80 yards

**Top receivers**

- SDG – Vincent Jackson – 4 receptions, 56 yards
- DEN – Jabar Gaffney – 3 receptions, 55 yards

Coming off their win against the Eagles, the Chargers flew to Invesco Field at Mile High for an AFC West rivalry rematch against the Denver Broncos.

In the first half, the Chargers got off to a great start when QB Philip Rivers got a 2-yard touchdown pass to WR Legedu Naanee. Then kicker Nate Kaeding hit a 28 and a 47-yard field goal. In the third quarter the Broncos scored their only points of the game when kicker Matt Prater got a 23-yard field goal, yet the Chargers replied and started to rally with RB LaDainian Tomlinson getting a 1-yard touchdown run, and in the fourth quarter Kaeding making a 28 then a 19-yard field goal, and finally FB Mike Tolbert ran 8 yards to the end zone for a touchdown (With PAT kick blocked).

With the impressive win, the Chargers improve to 7–3

==== Week 12: vs. Kansas City Chiefs ====
Week 12: Kansas City Chiefs at San Diego Chargers

Quarter	1	2	3	4	Total
Chiefs	0	7	7	0	**14**
**Chargers**	7	21	10	5	**43**

at Qualcomm Stadium, San Diego, California

- Date: November 22
- Game time: 1:05 p.m. PST
- Game weather: 63 °F (17 °C) (Sunny)
- Game attendance: 65,280
- Referee: Don Carey
- TV announcers (CBS): Dick Enberg & Dan Fouts
- Box score

Game information

**First quarter**

- SDG – Antonio Gates 19-yard pass from Philip Rivers (Nate Kaeding kick), 4:13. Chargers 7–0. **Drive: 7 plays, 61 yards, 3:35.**

**Second quarter**

- KAN – Chris Chambers 7-yard pass from Matt Cassel (Ryan Succop kick), 10:46. Tied 7–7. **Drive: 8 plays, 91 yards, 3:20.**
- SDG – LaDainian Tomlinson 1-yard run (Nate Kaeding kick), 10:05. Chargers 14–7. **Drive: 3 plays, 70 yards, 0:41.**
- SDG – Antonio Gates 15-yard pass from Philip Rivers (Nate Kaeding kick), 2:52. Chargers 21–7. **Drive: 7 plays, 61 yards, 4:12.**
- SDG – Paul Oliver 40-yard defensive fumble return (Nate Kaeding kick), 2:32. Chargers 28–7.

**Third quarter**

- SDG – LaDainian Tomlinson 3-yard run (Nate Kaeding kick), 12:58. Chargers 35–7. **Drive: 2 plays, 10 yards, 0:47.**
- KAN – Jamaal Charles 4-yard run (Ryan Succop kick), 9:45. Chargers 35–14. **Drive: 8 plays, 79 yards, 3:13.**
- SDG – Nate Kaeding 55-yard field goal, 4:27. Chargers 38–14. **Drive: 8 plays, 27 yards, 5:18.**

**Fourth quarter**

- SDG – Safety, Matt Cassel called for intentional grounding in end zone, 12:45. Chargers 40–14.
- SDG – Nate Kaeding 23-yard field goal, 5:08. Chargers 43–14. **Drive: 12 plays, 60 yards, 7:37.**

**Top passers**

- KAN – Matt Cassel – 19/31, 178 yards, TD, INT
- SDG – Philip Rivers – 21/28, 317 yards, 2 TD

**Top rushers**

- KAN – Jamaal Charles – 14 rushes, 93 yards, TD
- SDG – LaDainian Tomlinson – 13 rushes, 39 yards, 2 TD

**Top receivers**

- KAN – Chris Chambers – 7 receptions, 70 yards, TD
- SDG – Antonio Gates – 7 receptions, 118 yards, 2 TD

Looking to increase their win streak, the Chargers went home for an AFC West rivalry rematch against the Kansas City Chiefs. In the first quarter the Chargers took control as QB Philip Rivers got a 19-yard touchdown pass to TE Antonio Gates. The Chiefs would reply to tie the game with QB Matt Cassel making a 7-yard touchdown pass to WR Chris Chambers, until San Diego rallied with RB LaDainian Tomlinson getting a 1-yard touchdown run, then Rivers hooking up with Gates again on a 15-yard touchdown pass, then DB Paul Oliver returned a fumble 40 yards for a touchdown.

In the third quarter the Chargers dominance continued as RB LaDainian Tomlinson got a 3-yard touchdown run. The Chiefs tried to come back with RB Jamaal Charles getting a 2-yard touchdown run, but the Chargers would pull away with kicker Nate Kaeding making a 55-yard field goal. In the fourth quarter a penalty on Matt Cassel was enforced in the end zone for a safety, giving the Chargers 2 points. The final score was made when Kaeding booted a 23-yard field goal.

With the win, the Chargers improved to 8–3 and finished 5-1 against the AFC West.

==== Week 13: at Cleveland Browns ====
Week 13: San Diego Chargers at Cleveland Browns

Quarter	1	2	3	4	Total
**Chargers**	10	3	14	3	**30**
Browns	7	0	0	16	**23**

at Cleveland Browns Stadium, Cleveland, Ohio

- Date: December 6
- Game time: 4:05 p.m. EST
- Game weather: 34 °F (1 °C) (Sunny)
- Game attendance: 67,978
- Referee: Walt Coleman
- TV announcers (CBS): Kevin Harlan & Solomon Wilcots
- Box score

Game information

**First quarter**

- CLE – Mohamed Massaquoi 11-yard pass from Brady Quinn (Phil Dawson kick), 8:37. Browns 7–0. **Drive: 10 plays, 72 yards, 6:23.**
- SDG – Nate Kaeding 32-yard field goal, 2:59. Browns 7–3. **Drive: 12 plays, 55 yards, 5:38.**
- SDG – Mike Tolbert 66-yard pass from Philip Rivers (Nate Kaeding kick), 0:45. Chargers 10–7. **Drive: 1 play, 66 yards, 0:13.**

**Second quarter**

- SDG – Nate Kaeding 42-yard field goal, 0:00. Chargers 13–7. **Drive: 6 plays, 46 yards, 0:34.**

**Third quarter**

- SDG – Darren Sproles 31-yard pass from Philip Rivers (Nate Kaeding kick), 10:30. Chargers 20–7. **Drive: 8 plays, 85 yards, 4:30.**
- SDG – LaDainian Tomlinson 4-yard run (Nate Kaeding kick), 5:58. Chargers 27–7. **Drive: 6 plays, 83 yards, 3:22.**

**Fourth quarter**

- CLE – Jerome Harrison 8-yard pass from Brady Quinn (Phil Dawson kick), 9:15. Chargers 27–14. **Drive: 9 plays, 68 yards, 4:30.**
- SDG – Nate Kaeding 22-yard field goal, 4:12. Chargers 30–14. **Drive: 10 plays, 77 yards, 5:03.**
- CLE – Jerome Harrison 8-yard pass from Brady Quinn (run failed), 1:55. Chargers 30–20. **Drive: 7 plays, 58 yards, 2:17.**
- CLE – Phil Dawson 49-yard field goal, 0:39. Chargers 30–23. **Drive: 11 plays, 28 yards, 1:16.**

**Top passers**

- SDG – Philip Rivers – 18/25, 373 yards, 2 TD
- CLE – Brady Quinn – 25/45, 271 yards, 3 TD

**Top rushers**

- SDG – LaDainian Tomlinson – 20 rushes, 64 yards, TD
- CLE – Josh Cribbs – 4 rushes, 38 yards

**Top receivers**

- SDG – Antonio Gates – 8 receptions, 167 yards
- CLE – Evan Moore – 6 receptions, 80 yards

LaDainian Tomlinson had a game he would not soon forget. He passed Jim Brown, who happened to be sitting up in a suite. When Tomlinson passed him in the all-time rushing list, which made him number eight of all time rushers, he saluted the retired running back.

With the win, the Chargers improved to 9–3, and expanded their winning streak to seven games.

==== Week 14: at Dallas Cowboys ====
Week 14: San Diego Chargers at Dallas Cowboys

Quarter	1	2	3	4	Total
**Chargers**	7	3	0	10	**20**
Cowboys	3	0	7	7	**17**

at Cowboys Stadium, Arlington, Texas

- Date: December 13
- Game time: 3:15 p.m. CST
- Game weather: None (retractable roof closed)
- Game attendance: 90,552
- Referee: Gene Steratore
- TV announcers (CBS): Jim Nantz and Phil Simms
- Box score

Game information

**First quarter**

- DAL – Nick Folk 31-yard field goal, 8:36. Cowboys 3–0. **Drive: 10 plays, 41 yards, 6:24.**
- SDG – LaDainian Tomlinson 1-yard run (Nate Kaeding kick), 4:30. Chargers 7–3. **Drive: 7 plays, 84 yards, 4:06.**

**Second quarter**

- SDG – Nate Kaeding 29-yard field goal, 10:18. Chargers 10–3. **Drive: 14 plays, 64 yards, 6:58.**

**Third quarter**

- DAL – Miles Austin 6-yard pass from Tony Romo (Nick Folk kick), 0:00. Tied 10–10. **Drive: 11 plays, 99 yards, 7:19.**

**Fourth quarter**

- SDG – Antonio Gates 14-yard pass from Philip Rivers (Nate Kaeding kick), 10:56. Chargers 17–10. **Drive: 8 plays, 75 yards, 4:04.**
- SDG – Nate Kaeding 34-yard field goal, 1:56. Chargers 20–10. **Drive: 15 plays, 73 yards, 7:17.**
- DAL – Patrick Crayton 9-yard pass from Tony Romo (Nick Folk kick), 0:02. Chargers 20–17. **Drive: 9 plays, 86 yards, 1:54.**

**Top passers**

- SDG – Philip Rivers – 21/32, 272 yards, TD, INT
- DAL – Tony Romo – 19/30, 249 yards, 2 TD

**Top rushers**

- SDG – LaDainian Tomlinson – 21 rushes, 50 yards, TD
- DAL – Felix Jones – 10 rushes, 51 yards

**Top receivers**

- SDG – Vincent Jackson – 7 receptions, 120 yards
- DAL – Roy Williams – 4 receptions, 74 yards

San Diego came in with a 15–0 December record dated to 2005. San Diego gave up a field goal, then went on a 10-point streak. At the end of the third quarter, Dallas tied the game 10–10. Then the chargers piled up 10 more points, eating up the clock. By the time Dallas struck back, it was too late.

With the win, the Chargers increased their win streak to 8, and had a 10–3 record.

==== Week 15: vs. Cincinnati Bengals ====
Week 15: Cincinnati Bengals at San Diego Chargers

Quarter	1	2	3	4	Total
Bengals	3	10	0	11	**24**
**Chargers**	7	7	10	3	**27**

at Qualcomm Stadium, San Diego, California

- Date: December 20
- Game time: 1:05 p.m. PST
- Game weather: 72 °F (22 °C) (Cloudy)
- Game attendance: 68,889
- Referee: Carl Cheffers
- TV announcers (CBS): Jim Nantz and Phil Simms
- Box score

Game information

**First quarter**

- SDG – Antonio Gates 3-yard pass from Philip Rivers (Nate Kaeding kick), 10:06. Chargers 7–0. **Drive: 11 plays, 55 yards, 4:54.**
- CIN – Shayne Graham 26-yard field goal, 4:11. Chargers 7–3. **Drive: 12 plays, 53 yards, 5:55.**

**Second quarter**

- CIN – Chad Johnson 49-yard pass from Carson Palmer (Shayne Graham kick), 13:00. Bengals 10–7. **Drive: 8 plays, 77 yards, 4:06.**
- SDG – Vincent Jackson 21-yard pass from Philip Rivers (Nate Kaeding kick), 3:12. Chargers 14–10. **Drive: 9 plays, 72 yards, 5:09.**
- CIN – Shayne Graham 25-yard field goal, 0:07. Chargers 14–13. **Drive: 11 plays, 75 yards, 3:05.**

**Third quarter**

- SDG – Vincent Jackson 34-yard pass from Philip Rivers (Nate Kaeding kick), 6:26. Chargers 21–13. **Drive: 2 plays, 40 yards, 0:41.**
- SDG – Nate Kaeding 33-yard field goal, 1:02. Chargers 24–13. **Drive: 7 plays, 58 yards, 3:25.**

**Fourth quarter**

- CIN – Laveranues Coles 2-yard pass from Carson Palmer (Carson Palmer run), 12:37. Chargers 24–21. **Drive: 3 plays, 33 yards, 1:25.**
- CIN – Shayne Graham 34-yard field goal, 0:54. Tied 24–24. **Drive: 12 plays, 79 yards, 6:26.**
- SDG – Nate Kaeding 52-yard field goal, 0:03. Chargers 27–24. **Drive: 6 plays, 46 yards, 0:51.**

**Top passers**

- CIN – Carson Palmer – 27/40, 314 yards, 2 TD, INT
- SDG – Philip Rivers – 24/38, 308 yards, 3 TD, 2 INT

**Top rushers**

- CIN – Cedric Benson – 15 rushes, 53 yards
- SDG – LaDainian Tomlinson – 16 rushes, 59 yards

**Top receivers**

- CIN – J. P. Foschi – 7 receptions, 82 yards
- SDG – Vincent Jackson – 5 receptions, 108 yards, 2 TD

The Chargers took a 14–13 lead in the first half. During halftime, a piece was shown about the life of the Bengals' wide receiver Chris Henry. The Chargers were up in the fourth quarter 24–13 before the Bengals scored a TD with a 2-point conversion and a field goal tying the game. The Chargers won in the end with a 52-yard field goal by Nate Kaeding.

The close win put the Chargers at 11–3. It marked their 9th straight win and 17th straight win in December. With this win and a 20–19 loss by Denver to Oakland, the Chargers clinched the AFC West and finished 2-2 against the AFC North. As of 2025, this marks the last time the Chargers clinched the AFC West. This would also be their last division title in San Diego.

==== Week 16: at Tennessee Titans ====
Week 16: San Diego Chargers at Tennessee Titans

Quarter	1	2	3	4	Total
**Chargers**	7	14	14	7	**42**
Titans	3	7	0	7	**17**

at LP Field, Nashville, Tennessee

- Date: December 25
- Game time: 6:30 p.m. CST
- Game weather: 32 °F (0 °C) (Clear)
- Game attendance: 69,143
- Referee: Tony Corrente
- TV announcers (NFLN): Bob Papa & Matt Millen
- Box score

Game information

**First quarter**

- TEN – Rob Bironas 46-yard field goal, 8:12. Titans 3–0. **Drive: 8 plays, 52 yards, 3:29.**
- SDG – LaDainian Tomlinson 1-yard run (Nate Kaeding kick), 1:16. Chargers 7–3. **Drive: 13 plays, 76 yards, 6:56.**

**Second quarter**

- SDG – Antonio Gates 36-yard pass from Philip Rivers (Nate Kaeding kick), 8:46. Chargers 14–3. **Drive: 8 plays, 76 yards, 4:03.**
- SDG – Darren Sproles 3-yard pass from Philip Rivers (Nate Kaeding kick), 3:13. Chargers 21–3. **Drive: 7 plays, 52 yards, 3:20.**
- TEN – Vince Young 3-yard run (Rob Bironas kick), 0:17. Chargers 21–10. **Drive: 11 plays, 77 yards, 2:56.**

**Third quarter**

- SDG – LaDainian Tomlinson 1-yard run (Nate Kaeding kick), 9:49. Chargers 28–10. **Drive: 7 plays, 85 yards, 3:42.**
- SDG – Darren Sproles 9-yard run (Nate Kaeding kick), 4:52. Chargers 35–10. **Drive: 7 plays, 65 yards, 3:30.**

**Fourth quarter**

- SDG – Darren Sproles 1-yard run (Nate Kaeding kick), 14:56. Chargers 42–10. **Drive: 5 plays, 27 yards, 3:00.**
- TEN – Chris Johnson 30-yard run (Rob Bironas kick), 8:02. Chargers 42–17. **Drive: 2 plays, 33 yards, 0:46.**

**Top passers**

- SDG – Philip Rivers – 21/27, 264 yards, 2 TD
- TEN – Vince Young – 8/21, 89 yards, 2 INT

**Top rushers**

- SDG – Mike Tolbert – 11 rushes, 60 yards
- TEN – Chris Johnson – 21 rushes, 142 yards, TD

**Top receivers**

- SDG – Antonio Gates – 3 receptions, 74 yards, TD
- TEN – Nate Washington – 4 receptions, 39 yards

The Chargers came into the game looking to clinch the AFC's No. 2 seed and a first round bye on Christmas Day in Tennessee.

The Titans struck first with a Rob Bironas 46-yard field goal. Then 2 touchdown passes and a LT TD run put them up 21–10 at halftime. After the break the Chargers continued their demolition of the Titans with three straight TD runs. The game's final score was 42–17.

With the win, the Chargers improved to 12–3, clinching a first round bye and the No. 2 seed along with their 10th straight win.

==== Week 17: vs. Washington Redskins ====
Week 17: Washington Redskins at San Diego Chargers

Quarter	1	2	3	4	Total
Redskins	0	14	3	3	**20**
**Chargers**	10	3	0	10	**23**

at Qualcomm Stadium, San Diego, California

- Date: January 3
- Game time: 1:15 p.m. PST
- Game weather: 74 °F (23 °C) (Sunny)
- Game attendance: 67,554
- Referee: Jeff Triplette
- TV announcers (Fox): Ron Pitts, John Lynch, & Nischelle Turner
- Box score

Game information

**First quarter**

- SDG – Nate Kaeding 47-yard field goal, 11:22. Chargers 3–0. **Drive: 8 plays, 46 yards, 3:38.**
- SDG – Antonio Gates 12-yard pass from Philip Rivers (Nate Kaeding kick), 6:36. Chargers 10–0. **Drive: 11 plays, 61 yards, 3:43.**

**Second quarter**

- SDG – Nate Kaeding 24-yard field goal, 11:34. Chargers 13–0. **Drive: 11 plays, 74 yards, 5:06.**
- WAS – Todd Yoder 2-yard pass from Jason Campbell (Graham Gano kick), 5:16. Chargers 13–7. **Drive: 12 plays, 75 yards, 6:18.**
- WAS – Mike Sellers 3-yard pass from Jason Campbell (Graham Gano kick), 0:39. Redskins 14–13. **Drive: 4 plays, 88 yards, 2:12.**

**Third quarter**

- WAS – Graham Gano 22-yard field goal, 9:06. Redskins 17–13. **Drive: 9 plays, 47 yards, 3:50.**

**Fourth quarter**

- SDG – Nate Kaeding 45-yard field goal, 12:06. Redskins 17–16. **Drive: 8 plays, 59 yards, 3:01.**
- WAS – Graham Gano 25-yard field goal, 4:33. Redskins 20–16. **Drive: 14 plays, 69 yards, 7:33.**
- SDG – Mike Tolbert 2-yard pass from Billy Volek (Nate Kaeding kick), 0:35. Chargers 23–20. **Drive: 12 plays, 58 yards, 3:58.**

**Top passers**

- WAS – Jason Campbell – 28/42, 281 yards, 2 TD
- SDG – Billy Volek – 19/30, 216 yards, TD, INT

**Top rushers**

- WAS – Quinton Ganther – 12 rushes, 29 yards
- SDG – Michael Bennett – 11 rushes, 28 yards

**Top receivers**

- WAS – Malcolm Kelly – 5 receptions, 109 yards
- SDG – Malcom Floyd – 9 receptions, 140 yards

With the win, the Chargers finished the season with an 11-game winning streak and with a record of 13–3 and also were the only team in the AFC West to sweep the whole NFC East.

=== Standings ===
AFC West
	W	L	T	PCT	DIV	CONF	PF	PA	STK
^{(2)} San Diego Chargers	13	3	0	.813	5–1	9–3	454	320	W11
Denver Broncos	8	8	0	.500	3–3	6–6	326	324	L4
Oakland Raiders	5	11	0	.313	2–4	4–8	197	379	L2
Kansas City Chiefs	4	12	0	.250	2–4	3–9	294	424	W1

== Postseason ==
Round	Date	Opponent (seed)	Result	Record	Venue	Recap
Divisional	January 17, 2010	New York Jets (5)	L 14–17	0–1	Qualcomm Stadium	Recap

=== Game summaries ===
==== AFC Divisional Playoffs: vs. (5) New York Jets ====
AFC Divisional Playoffs: (5) New York Jets at (2) San Diego Chargers – Game summary

Quarter	1	2	3	4	Total
Jets	0	0	3	14	17
Chargers	0	7	0	7	14

at Qualcomm Stadium, San Diego, California

- Date: January 17
- Game time: 1:40 p.m. PST
- Game weather: 63 °F (17 °C), relative humidity 42%, wind 8 mph
- Game attendance: 69,498
- Referee: Jerome Boger
- TV announcers (CBS): Jim Nantz & Phil Simms
- Box score

Game information

First quarter

- No scoring plays.

Second quarter

- SDG – Kris Wilson 13-yard pass from Philip Rivers (Nate Kaeding kick), 12:17. Chargers 7–0. Drive: 4 plays, 69 yards, 1:56.

Third quarter

- NYJ – Jay Feely 46-yard field goal, 10:45. Chargers 7–3. Drive: 8 plays, 32 yards, 4:15.

Fourth quarter

- NYJ – Dustin Keller 2-yard pass from Mark Sanchez (Jay Feely kick), 13:35. Jets 10–7. Drive: 4 plays, 16 yards, 1:27.
- NYJ – Shonn Greene 53-yard run (Jay Feely kick), 7:17. Jets 17–7. Drive: 4 plays, 66 yards, 2:10.
- SDG – Philip Rivers 1-yard run (Nate Kaeding kick), 2:14. Jets 17–14. Drive: 7 plays, 63 yards, 1:22.

Top passers

- NYJ – Mark Sanchez – 12/23, 100 yards, TD, INT
- SDG – Philip Rivers – 27/40, 298 yards, TD, 2 INT

Top rushers

- NYJ – Shonn Greene – 23 rushes, 128 yards, TD
- SDG – Darren Sproles – 3 rushes, 33 yards

Top receivers

- NYJ – Braylon Edwards – 2 receptions, 41 yards
- SDG – Vincent Jackson – 7 receptions, 111 yards

Entering the playoffs as the AFC's No. 2 seed, the Chargers began their playoff run at home in the AFC Divisional Round against the No. 5 New York Jets. After a scoreless first quarter, San Diego delivered the game's first strike in the second quarter as quarterback Philip Rivers found tight end Kris Wilson on a 13-yard touchdown pass. The Jets would respond in the third quarter with a 46-yard field goal from kicker Jay Feely. Philip Rivers threw two interceptions and the San Diego Chargers offense failed to get one first down as the Jets defense controlled the third quarter. Then, New York would take the lead in the fourth quarter as quarterback Mark Sanchez completed a 2-yard touchdown pass to tight end Dustin Keller, followed by a 53-yard touchdown run from running back Shonn Greene. The Chargers unsuccessfully tried to rally as struggling quarterback Philip Rivers got a 1-yard touchdown run. However, the Chargers failed to recover the onside kick giving the Jets the ball at the Chargers 28-yard line. The Chargers held the Jets to a 4th and 1 yard to go situation, but the Jets ran the ball converting the first down and kneeled the ball to end the game, finishing the Chargers' season. During the game, Chargers All Pro kicker Nate Kaeding missed field goals from 36, 57 and 40 yards. As it turned out, this would be the last ever playoff game played at Qualcomm Stadium; the Chargers didn't win the AFC West again during their stay in San Diego, and their last two playoff games as a San Diego-based franchise occurred on the road in the 2013 season. The Chargers have yet to host a playoff game as a Los Angeles-based team.

== Awards ==
Six Chargers were named to the 2010 Pro Bowl, and three were named first or second team Associated Press (AP) All-Pros. Rivers received two votes for AP NFL Most Valuable Player and one for AP NFL Offensive Player of the Year, and Turner finished in third place for NFL Coach of the Year with nine of the fifty votes available.

Player	Position	Pro Bowl starter	Pro Bowl reserve	Pro Bowl alternate	AP 1st team All-Pro	AP 2nd team All-Pro
Kris Dielman	Guard		Yes			Yes
Antonio Gates	Tight end			Yes		Yes
Vincent Jackson	Wide receiver			Yes		
Nate Kaeding	Kicker	Yes			Yes	
Kassim Osgood	Special teams	Yes				
Philip Rivers	Quarterback		Yes			
