= Paul Oliver (American football) =

American football player (1984–2013)

- Oliver with the San Diego Chargers

No. 27
- Position: Safety

Personal information
- Born: March 30, 1984; Kennesaw, Georgia, U.S.
- Died: September 24, 2013 (aged 29); Marietta, Georgia, U.S.
- Listed height: 5 ft 11 in (1.80 m)
- Listed weight: 210 lb (95 kg)

Career information
- High school: Harrison (Kennesaw)
- College: Georgia
- Supplemental draft: 2007: 4th round

Career history
- San Diego Chargers (2007–2010); New Orleans Saints (2011); San Diego Chargers (2011)

Career NFL statistics
- Total tackles: 145
- Sacks: 1
- Forced fumbles: 1
- Fumble recoveries: 3
- Interceptions: 4
- Defensive touchdowns: 1
- Stats at Pro Football Reference

Paul J. Oliver (March 30, 1984 – September 24, 2013) was an American professional football safety of the National Football League (NFL) who was selected in the fourth round of the 2007 Supplemental NFL draft by the San Diego Chargers. He was also briefly a member of the New Orleans Saints.

== Early life ==
Oliver was heavily recruited as a Parade High School All-American for the Harrison High School Hoyas. He was also ranked as the #1 cornerback by Rivals.com in 2003, and at 185 pounds timed unofficially with a 4.32 second 40-yard dash and a 37-inch vertical jump.

== College career ==
Oliver decided to stay close to home and committed to playing college football at the University of Georgia. After redshirting for a year, Oliver developed into a key reserve in his first two years playing, earning him preseason third-team All-SEC honors before his 3rd year. Oliver, thrust into a starting role broke out as one of the best corners in the SEC his junior year. In his first game as a starter, filling in for the injured DeMario Minter, Oliver shut down University of Florida star Chad Jackson, holding him to only 2 catches for 22 yards. Oliver was awarded with Georgia's Most Improved Defensive Player Award after the 2005 season.

Oliver had his best game as a Bulldog on November 25, 2006, against Georgia Tech shutting down the 2nd overall pick in the 2007 NFL draft, Calvin Johnson, though not without some help from Georgia Tech quarterback Reggie Ball. Oliver, whose primary role was to contain Johnson, ended up frustrating the All-American by holding him to only 13 yards and 2 receptions, batting away 3 balls intended for Johnson and intercepting another. Reggie Ball threw the pass into heavy traffic on the Yellow Jackets final drive and Oliver came up with the interception sealing a 15–12 Bulldog victory. Oliver finished the day with 4 solo tackles, 3 of which were on third down plays in the red zone, and also forced a fumble. Oliver ended his three-season career at Georgia with 7 interceptions, 8 deflected passes, 94 tackles (74 solo), 8.5 tackles for loss, 3 sacks, 5 forced fumbles, and 2 recovered fumbles.

=== Early departure ===
Oliver was ruled academically ineligible on May 17, 2007, and decided to apply for the 2007 supplemental draft held 2 months later on July 12, 2007. Oliver, who tested well in the Wonderlic Test, was seen as a player who lacked the motivation to succeed in school rather than not having the aptitude or intelligence.

== Professional career ==
=== 2007 supplemental draft ===
Despite not having as much time to train as other prospects who go through the normal draft process, Oliver was able to garner enough interest to be the consensus #1 player in the supplemental draft. The San Diego Chargers ended up bidding their 2008 4th rounder for the rights to select Oliver making him the first of only two players selected in 2007's supplemental draft. The other player was Maryland tackle Jared Gaither selected by the Baltimore Ravens one round after Oliver.

In a statement concerning Oliver, Chargers General Manager, A. J. Smith said, "We had the opportunity to get a good football player today, and we took it. Paul Oliver is a very competitive, aggressive, confident player. He's not cautious about anything he does on the field. You know how we like depth. We'll add Paul to the mix as a Charger and time will tell."

Despite timing poorly at his 2007 Pro Day, Oliver displayed good footwork and also did well in cornerback drills.

Pre-draft measurables
Height	Weight	40-yard dash	Vertical jump
5 ft 10 5/8 in (1.79 m)	198 lb (90 kg)	4.56 s	33 1/2 in (0.85 m)
All values from Pro Day.

=== NFL career ===
Oliver played for the Chargers from 2007 to 2010. He then became a free agent and signed with the Saints, but was released after being injured during training camp. On September 21, 2011, Oliver returned to the Chargers for the 2011 season.

== NFL career statistics ==
Legend
	Led the league
**Bold**	Career high

=== Regular season ===
Year	Team	Games		Tackles					Interceptions					Fumbles			
Year	Team	GP	GS	Cmb	Solo	Ast	Sck	TFL	Int	Yds	TD	Lng	PD	FF	FR	Yds	TD
2008	SDG	12	0	15	13	2	0.0	0	**1**	0	0	0	1	0	0	0	0
2009	SDG	**16**	3	49	38	11	**1.0**	**2**	**1**	**34**	0	**34**	3	0	1	**40**	**1**
2010	SDG	**16**	**8**	**62**	**47**	**15**	0.0	1	**1**	15	0	15	3	**1**	**2**	23	0
2011	SDG	13	1	19	16	3	0.0	0	**1**	7	0	7	**4**	0	0	0	0
		57	12	145	114	31	1.0	3	4	56	0	34	11	1	3	63	1

=== Playoffs ===
Year	Team	Games		Tackles					Interceptions					Fumbles			
Year	Team	GP	GS	Cmb	Solo	Ast	Sck	TFL	Int	Yds	TD	Lng	PD	FF	FR	Yds	TD
2008	SDG	**2**	0	**4**	**3**	**1**	0.0	0	0	0	0	0	0	0	0	0	0
2009	SDG	1	0	2	1	**1**	0.0	0	0	0	0	0	0	0	0	0	0
		3	0	6	4	2	0.0	0	0	0	0	0	0	0	0	0	0

== Death ==
Oliver died by suicide from a self-inflicted gunshot on September 24, 2013. He is survived by his wife Chelsea (née Young), and two children. Police on the incident state that Oliver shot himself in front of his wife and his two young boys.

It was later determined through analysis of Oliver's brain that he suffered from an advanced form of chronic traumatic encephalopathy, or CTE, caused by repeated hits to the head he endured during his football playing career. He is one of at least 345 NFL players to be diagnosed after death with this disease.
