= Brian Bonner =

Brian Bonner may refer to:

- Brian Bonner (racing driver) (born 1959), American driver in the CART Championship Car series
- Brian Bonner (linebacker) (born 1965), former American football linebacker in the National Football League for the San Francisco 49ers and the Washington Redskins
- Brian Bonner (safety) (born 1984), Canadian football safety who playing for the Edmonton Eskimos
