= Joel Gamble =

American football player (born 1982)

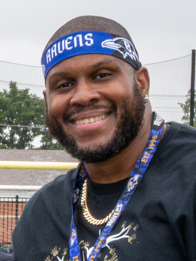
- Gamble in 2025

No. 48, 87
- Position: Fullback/Tight end

Personal information
- Born: December 25, 1982 (age 43); Baltimore, Maryland, U.S.
- Listed height: 6 ft 2 in (1.88 m)
- Listed weight: 265 lb (120 kg)

Career information
- College: Shippensburg
- NFL draft: 2005: undrafted

Career history
- Tennessee Valley Vipers (2007); Oklahoma City Yard Dawgz (2007); Bossier-Shreveport Battle Wings (2008); D.C. Armor (2009); Philadelphia Eagles (2009)*; Cleveland Browns (2010)*; Tennessee Titans (2010)*
- * Offseason or practice squad member only

Awards and highlights
- First-team All-PSAC Western Division honors (2003)

Joel Gamble (born December 25, 1982) is an American former professional football fullback and tight end. He was signed by the Tennessee Valley Vipers as a street free agent in 2007. He played college football at Shippensburg.

Gamble was also a member of the Oklahoma City Yard Dawgz, Bossier-Shreveport Battle Wings, D.C. Armor, Philadelphia Eagles, Cleveland Browns and Tennessee Titans.

== Early life ==
Gamble attended Carver Vocational Technical High School.

== College career ==
Gamble played college football at Shippensburg from 2001-2004. In 2002, his sophomore year, Gamble led the team with 16 receptions for 233 yards. He averaged 14.6 yards per reception. In his junior year, he earned first-team All-PSAC Western Division honors. He caught 20 passes for 229 yards and two touchdowns. He created a streak of nine games in which he had at least one catch. In his senior year, he caught nine passes for 166 yards and three touchdowns. His three touchdowns were ranked second on the team behind Patrick Ferguson, who had seven. Gamble averaged 18.4 yards per catch. He caught a 21-yard touchdown pass against West Chester University in the playoffs to give his team a 28-27 lead. He caught a 61-yard pass from Tony Gomez, a career-long, against Lock Haven, to set up a John Kuhn three-yard touchdown three plays later.

For his career, Gamble totaled 41 catches for 631 yards and five touchdowns. He averaged 15.4 yards per catch.

== Professional career ==
=== Philadelphia Eagles ===
Gamble was signed to the Philadelphia Eagles practice squad on December 9, 2009, after Marcus Mailei was signed off the practice squad by the New Orleans Saints.

=== Cleveland Browns ===
Gamble signed with the Cleveland Browns on July 19, 2010. He was waived on August 13 but was re-signed on August 17. He was waived again on September 3.

=== Tennessee Titans ===
Gamble was signed to the Tennessee Titans' practice squad on October 5, 2010. He was released on November 16.

== Personal ==
Gamble is the son of Ricardo and Michelle Gamble. He earned a degree in criminal justice from Shippensburg University of Pennsylvania. Gamble is the founder of The Joel Gamble Foundation who is dedicated to educating and preparing aspiring Greater Baltimore area student athletes in order to successfully compete. He was also a teacher at Patapsco High School and Center for the Art in Dundalk, Maryland. He currently holds a position in the YMCA.
