= Steve Gera =

American sports executive and coach (born 1978)

Stephen Francis Gera (born July 26, 1978) is an American sports executive and coach. Prior to coaching for the Browns, he was with the San Diego Chargers. He was a decorated officer with the United States Marine Corps, serving two tours in Iraq.
