= 2010 San Diego Chargers season =

NFL team 51st season

- Owner: Alex Spanos
- General manager: A. J. Smith
- Head coach: Norv Turner
- Home stadium: Qualcomm Stadium

Results
- Record: 9–7
- Division place: 2nd AFC West
- Playoffs: Did not qualify
- All-Pros: 2: TE Antonio Gates (2nd team); S Eric Weddle (2nd team)
- Pro Bowlers: 4: OG Kris Dielman; TE Antonio Gates; OLB Shaun Phillips; QB Philip Rivers

The 2010 season was the San Diego Chargers' 41st in the National Football League (NFL) and their 51st overall. The team failed to improve on their 13–3 record the previous season, finishing with a 9–7 record and missing the playoffs for the first time since 2005.

The 2010 Chargers are noted for having both the No. 1-ranked offense and defense, the first team to do so since the 1996 Green Bay Packers. However, a struggling special teams unit caused the Chargers to lose five of their first seven games, each of which was by a one-possession margin. The San Diego Union-Tribune wrote, "no team even came close to having all those special teams foibles in one season." Football Outsiders calculated that the Chargers had the worst special teams in the league in 2010 and the fifth-worst from 1993 to 2010. Although the Chargers won seven of their nine remaining matchups, they were unable to overcome the slow start and missed the postseason by one game. An additional victory would have allowed the Chargers to win the AFC West on a tiebreaker, but they instead finished a game behind the Kansas City Chiefs.

In addition to their statistical performance, the Chargers used an NFL-record tying 74 players during the season due to injuries. The 2010 season also saw the Chargers have their first home blackouts since 2004 and was their first since 2000 not to have future Hall of Fame running back LaDainian Tomlinson on the roster.

== Offseason ==
On February 22, 2010, LaDainian Tomlinson requested his release after nine seasons with the team, and went to the New York Jets.

=== NFL draft ===
After finishing the season with the best record among teams exiting the playoffs in the divisional round, the Chargers picked 28th in the draft. They traded their sixth-round pick in a trade that sent defensive tackle Travis Johnson to the Chargers.

2010 San Diego Chargers draft
Round	Pick	Player	Position	College	Notes
1	12	Ryan Mathews *	RB	Fresno State	from Miami (Note: #12: Miami → San Diego (D). Miami traded this selection, a fourth-round selection (110th overall; San Diego selected Darrell Stuckey), and a sixth-round selection it acquired from Kansas City (173rd overall; traded to San Francisco who selected Anthony Dixon) to San Diego for a first-round selection (28th overall; Miami selected Jared Odrick), a second-round selection it acquired from Seattle (40th overall; Miami selected Koa Misi), a fourth-round selection (126th overall; traded to Dallas who selected Akwasi Owusu-Ansah), and linebacker Tim Dobbins.)
3	79	Donald Butler	LB	Washington	from San Francisco (Note: #79: San Francisco → San Diego (D). San Francisco traded this selection to San Diego for a third-round selection (91st overall; San Francisco selected NaVorro Bowman), a sixth-round selection it acquired from Miami (173rd overall; San Francisco selected Anthony Dixon), and a fourth-round selection.)
4	110	Darrell Stuckey *	S	Kansas	from Miami (Note: #110: Miami → San Diego (D). See #12: Miami → San Diego above.)
5	146	Cam Thomas	DT	North Carolina	from Denver via Detroit, Cleveland and Philadelphia (Note: #146: multiple trades: #146: Denver → Detroit (PD). Denver traded this selection and a 2009 seventh-round selection (235th overall; Detroit selected Zack Follett) to Detroit for a 2009 sixth-round selection (174th overall; Denver selected Tom Brandstater). #146: Detroit → Cleveland (PD). Detroit traded this selection it acquired from Denver to Cleveland for defensive lineman Corey Williams and a seventh-round selection (214th overall; traded to Minnesota, who selected Mickey Shuler, Jr.). #146: Cleveland → Philadelphia (D). See #59: Philadelphia → Cleveland above. #146: Philadelphia → San Diego (D). Philadelphia traded this selection it acquired from Cleveland to San Diego for a fifth-round selection (159th overall; Philadelphia selected Riley Cooper) and a 2011 fifth-round selection.)
5	168	Jonathan Crompton	QB	Tennessee	
7	235	Dedrick Epps	TE	Miami (FL)	
Made roster † Pro Football Hall of Fame * Made at least one Pro Bowl during career

== Coaching staff ==
San Diego Chargers 2010 staff
Front office: Owner – Alex Spanos; President/CEO – Dean Spanos; Executive vice president – Michael Spanos; Executive vice president/executive officer – A. G. Spanos; Executive vice president/general manager – A. J. Smith; Executive vice president of football operations/assistant general manager – Ed McGuire; Senior executive – Randy Mueller; Director of player personnel – Jimmy Raye; Director of pro scouting – Dennis Abraham; Director of college scouting – John Spanos; Assistant director of college scouting – Mike Biehl; Head coaches: Head coach – Norv Turner; Assistant head coach/tight ends – Rob Chudzinski; Assistant to the head coach – Margie Smith; Coaches’ Assistant – Steve Gera; Offensive coaches: Offensive coordinator – Clarence Shelmon; Quarterbacks – John Ramsdell; Running backs – Ollie Wilson; Wide receivers – Charlie Joiner; Offensive line – Hal Hunter; Offensive line – Mike Sullivan	Defensive coaches: Defensive coordinator – Ron Rivera; Defensive line – Don Johnson; Linebackers – John Pagano; Assistant linebackers – Greg Williams; Secondary – Steven Wilks; Assistant secondary – Cris Dishman; Special teams coaches: Special teams – Steve Crosby; Assistant special teams – Carlos Polk; Strength and conditioning: Strength and conditioning – Jeff Hurd; Assistant strength and conditioning – Vernon Stephens

== Final roster ==
2010 San Diego Chargers roster
Quarterbacks (QB): 17 Philip Rivers; 7 Billy Volek; Running backs (RB): 44 Curtis Brinkley; 22 Jacob Hester; 34 Billy Latsko FB; 24 Ryan Mathews; 43 Darren Sproles; Wide receivers (WR): 89 Seyi Ajirotutu; 12 Patrick Crayton; 80 Malcom Floyd; 83 Vincent Jackson; 11 Legedu Naanee; 87 Kelley Washington; Tight ends (TE): 81 Randy McMichael; 82 Kory Sperry; 88 Kris Wilson	Offensive linemen (OL): 66 Jeromey Clary T; 68 Kris Dielman G; 62 Brandyn Dombrowski T; 69 Tyronne Green G; 61 Nick Hardwick C; 73 Marcus McNeill T; 63 Scott Mruczkowski C; 65 Louis Vasquez G; Defensive linemen (DL): 93 Luis Castillo DE; 74 Jacques Cesaire DE; 71 Antonio Garay NT; 96 Travis Johnson DE; 92 Vaughn Martin DE; 91 Ogemdi Nwagbuo NT; 76 Cam Thomas NT	Linebackers (LB): 90 Antwan Applewhite OLB; 98 Antwan Barnes OLB; 46 Darry Beckwith ILB; 99 Kevin Burnett ILB; 52 Larry English OLB; 57 Brandon Lang OLB; 49 Brandon Moore ILB; 95 Shaun Phillips OLB; 59 Brandon Siler ILB; Defensive backs (DB): 31 Tyrone Carter FS; 20 Antoine Cason CB/PR; 28 Steve Gregory SS; 33 Dante Hughes CB; 23 Quentin Jammer CB; 27 Paul Oliver SS; 30 Donald Strickland CB; 25 Darrell Stuckey SS; 36 Quinton Teal SS; 32 Eric Weddle FS; Special teams (ST): 10 Nate Kaeding K; 5 Mike Scifres P; 47 Mike Windt LS	Practice squad: 16 Gary Banks WR; 15 Richard Goodman WR (IR); 58 Jeremy Leman LB; 67 Ryan Otterson T (IR); 79 Nick Richmond T; 37 Traye Simmons CB; 13 Bryan Walters WR; 72 Eric Young G; Reserve: 50 David Binn LS (IR); 51 Donald Butler ILB (IR); 54 Stephen Cooper ILB (IR); 84 Craig Davis WR (IR); -- James Dearth LS (IR); 85 Antonio Gates TE (IR); 53 James Holt ILB (IR); 58 Ryan Neill LS (IR); 35 Mike Tolbert FB (IR); 94 Jyles Tucker OLB (IR); 26 Pat Watkins SS (IR); 42 Kion Wilson ILB (IR); Rookies in italics 53 active, 14 reserve, 6 practice squad

== Preseason ==
Week	Date	Opponent	Result	Record	Game site	NFL.com recap
1	August 14	Chicago Bears	W 25–10	1–0	Qualcomm Stadium	Recap
2	August 21	Dallas Cowboys	L 14–16	1–1	Qualcomm Stadium	Recap
3	August 27	at New Orleans Saints	L 21–36	1–2	Louisiana Superdome	Recap
4	September 2	at San Francisco 49ers	L 14–17	1–3	Candlestick Park	Recap

== Regular season ==
=== Schedule ===
Week	Date	Opponent	Result	Record	Game site	NFL.com recap
1	September 13	at Kansas City Chiefs	L 14–21	0–1	Arrowhead Stadium	Recap
2	September 19	Jacksonville Jaguars	W 38–13	1–1	Qualcomm Stadium	Recap
3	September 26	at Seattle Seahawks	L 20–27	1–2	Qwest Field	Recap
4	October 3	Arizona Cardinals	W 41–10	2–2	Qualcomm Stadium	Recap
5	October 10	at Oakland Raiders	L 27–35	2–3	Oakland–Alameda County Coliseum	Recap
6	October 17	at St. Louis Rams	L 17–20	2–4	Edward Jones Dome	Recap
7	October 24	New England Patriots	L 20–23	2–5	Qualcomm Stadium	Recap
8	October 31	Tennessee Titans	W 33–25	3–5	Qualcomm Stadium	Recap
9	November 7	at Houston Texans	W 29–23	4–5	Reliant Stadium	Recap
10	Bye					
11	November 22	Denver Broncos	W 35–14	5–5	Qualcomm Stadium	Recap
12	November 28	at Indianapolis Colts	W 36–14	6–5	Lucas Oil Stadium	Recap
13	December 5	Oakland Raiders	L 13–28	6–6	Qualcomm Stadium	Recap
14	December 12	Kansas City Chiefs	W 31–0	7–6	Qualcomm Stadium	Recap
15	December 16	San Francisco 49ers	W 34–7	8–6	Qualcomm Stadium	Recap
16	December 26	at Cincinnati Bengals	L 20–34	8–7	Paul Brown Stadium	Recap
17	January 2	at Denver Broncos	W 33–28	9–7	Invesco Field at Mile High	Recap

=== Game summaries ===
==== Week 1: at Kansas City Chiefs ====
Week One: San Diego Chargers at Kansas City Chiefs – Game summary

Quarter	1	2	3	4	Total
Chargers	7	0	7	0	14
Chiefs	7	14	0	0	21

at Arrowhead Stadium, Kansas City, Missouri

- Date: September 13
- Game time: 9:20 p.m. CDT
- Game weather: 78 °F (26 °C), Rain & wind
- Game attendance: 71,297
- Referee: Pete Morelli
- TV announcers (ESPN): Brad Nessler, Trent Dilfer, & Suzy Kolber
- Recap, Gamebook

Game information

First quarter

- SDG – Antonio Gates 3-yard pass from Philip Rivers (Nate Kaeding kick), 1:52. Chargers 7–0. Drive: 9 plays, 60 yards, 4:45.
- KC – Jamaal Charles 56-yard run (Ryan Succop kick), 0:37. Tied 7–7. Drive: 3 plays, 69 yards, 1:15.

Second quarter

- KC – Tony Moeaki 2-yard pass from Matt Cassell (Ryan Succop kick), 5:55. Chiefs 14–7. Drive: 3 plays, 12 yards, 1:26.
- KC – Dexter McCluster 94-yard punt return (Ryan Succop kick), 1:43. Chiefs 21–7.

Third quarter

- SDG – Legedu Naanee 59-yard pass from Philip Rivers (Nate Kaeding kick), 2:23. Chiefs 21–14. Drive: 5 plays, 91 yards, 2:51.

Fourth quarter

- No scoring plays.

Top passers

- SDG – Philip Rivers – 22/39, 298 yards, 2 TD
- KC – Matt Cassel – 10/22, 68 yards, TD

Top rushers

- SDG – Ryan Mathews – 20 rushes, 78 yards
- KC – Jamaal Charles – 11 rushes, 92 yards, TD

Top receivers

- SDG – Legedu Naanee – 5 receptions, 110 yards, TD
- KC – Tony Moeaki – 3 receptions, 21 yards, TD

Top tacklers

- SDG – Steve Gregory – 7 tackles
- KC – Derrick Johnson – 11 tackles, 1 assist, 1 forced fumble

The Chargers began their season at Arrowhead Stadium for a division rivalry match against the Kansas City Chiefs. In the first quarter the Chargers took the early lead as QB Philip Rivers completed a 3-yard TD pass to TE Antonio Gates. The Chiefs replied when RB Jamaal Charles made a 56-yard TD run. In the 2nd quarter the Chargers fell behind when QB Matt Cassel completed a 2-yard TD pass to TE Tony Moeaki. This was followed by WR Dexter McCluster returning a punt 94 yards to the endzone for a touchdown. In the third quarter the Chargers cut the lead when QB Philip Rivers threw a 59-yard TD pass to WR Legedu Naanee. In the 4th quarter the Chiefs defense prevented any more scoring from the Chargers.

With the loss, San Diego began at 0–1.

==== Week 2: vs. Jacksonville Jaguars ====
Week Two: Jacksonville Jaguars at San Diego Chargers – Game summary

Quarter	1	2	3	4	Total
Jaguars	3	3	0	7	13
Chargers	7	14	3	14	38

at Qualcomm Stadium, San Diego, California

- Date: September 19
- Game time: 1:15 p.m. PDT
- Game weather: 76 °F (24 °C) (Sunny)
- Game attendance: 62,691
- Referee: Terry McAulay
- TV announcers (CBS): Gus Johnson and Steve Tasker (blacked out locally)
- Game Recap

Game information

First quarter

- SDG – Mike Tolbert 2-yard run (Nate Kaeding kick), 11:42. Chargers 7–0. Drive: 6 plays, 74 yards, 3:18.
- JAC – Josh Scobee 44-yard field goal, 5:29. Chargers 7–3. Drive: 6 plays, 18 yards, 2:33.

Second quarter

- SDG – Antonio Gates 9-yard pass from Philip Rivers (Nate Kaeding kick), 11:32. Chargers 14–3. Drive: 5 plays, 30 yards, 2:10.
- JAC – Josh Scobee 48-yard field goal, 1:55. Chargers 14–6. Drive: 6 plays, 14 yards, 3:42.
- SDG – Antonio Gates 4-yard pass from Philip Rivers (Nate Kaeding kick), 0:10. Chargers 21–6. Drive: 8 plays, 87 yards, 1:45.

Third quarter

- SDG – Nate Kaeding 41-yard field goal, 4:55. Chargers 24–6. Drive: 9 plays, 44 yards, 4:21.

Fourth quarter

- SDG – Mike Tolbert 1-yard run (Nate Kaeding kick), 13:18. Chargers 31–6. Drive: 5 plays, 58 yards, 2:18.
- SDG – Malcom Floyd 54-yard pass from Philip Rivers (Nate Kaeding kick), 8:06. Chargers 38–6. Drive: 4 plays, 63 yards, 2:08.
- JAC – Mike Sims-Walker 24-yard pass from David Garrard (Josh Scobee kick), 0:37. Chargers 38–13. Drive: 8 plays, 53 yards, 2:34.

Top passers

- JAC – David Garrard – 15/23, 173 yards, TD, 4 INT
- SDG – Philip Rivers – 22/29, 334 yards, 3 TD, 2 INT

Top rushers

- JAC – Rashad Jennings – 6 rushes, 38 yards
- SDG – Mike Tolbert – 16 rushes, 82 yards, 2 TD

Top receivers

- JAC – Mike Sims-Walker – 10 receptions, 105 yards, TD
- SDG – Antonio Gates – 5 receptions, 57 yards, 2 TD

Top tacklers

- JAC – Courtney Greene – 8 tackles, 3 assists, 1 forced fumble, 1 recovered fumble
- SDG – Steve Gregory – 8 tackles, 5 assists

Hoping to rebound from their loss to the Chiefs, the Chargers returned home for an AFC duel with the Jaguars. In the 1st quarter, San Diego took the early lead as FB Mike Tolbert made a 2-yard TD run. The Jaguars replied with kicker Josh Scobee hitting a 44-yard field goal. The Chargers increased their lead as QB Philip Rivers completed a 9-yard TD pass to TE Antonio Gates. The Jaguars tried to cut the lead with Scobee nailing a 48-yard field goal. The Chargers continued to score with Rivers making a 4-yard TD pass to Gates; followed in the 3rd quarter by kicker Nate Kaeding getting a 41-yard field goal. In the 4th quarter the Chargers continued to dominate with FB Mike Tolbert getting a 1-yard TD run, followed by Rivers completing a 54-yard TD pass to WR Malcolm Floyd. The lead was slightly narrowed when QB David Garrard made a 3-yard TD pass to WR Mike Sims-Walker.

With the win, the Chargers improved to 1–1.

==== Week 3: at Seattle Seahawks ====
Week Three: San Diego Chargers at Seattle Seahawks – Game summary

Quarter	1	2	3	4	Total
Chargers	0	0	12	8	20
Seahawks	0	10	7	10	27

at Qwest Field, Seattle, Washington

- Date: September 26
- Game time: 1:15 p.m. PDT
- Game weather: 68 °F (20 °C) (Cloudy)
- Game attendance: 67,106
- Referee: Ron Winter
- TV announcers (CBS): Ian Eagle and Dan Fouts
- Recap

Game information

First quarter

- No scoring plays.

Second quarter

- SEA – Olindo Mare 23-yard field goal, 11:28. Seahawks 3–0. Drive: 9 plays, 80 yards, 4:38.
- SEA – John Carlson 9-yard pass from Matt Hasselbeck (Olindo Mare kick), 0:53. Seahawks 10–0. Drive: 3 plays, 41 yards, 0:22.

Third quarter

- SEA – Leon Washington 101-yard kickoff return (Olindo Mare kick), 14:47. Seahawks 17–0. Drive: 0 plays, 0 yards, 0:13.
- SDG – Malcom Floyd 3-yard pass from Philip Rivers (Nate Kaeding kick), 12:33. Seahawks 17–7. Drive: 4 plays, 80 yards, 2:14.
- SDG – Safety, Matt Hasselbeck sacked by Brandon Siler in end zone, 4:31. Seahawks 17–9.
- SDG – Nate Kaeding 29-yard field goal, 0:37. Seahawks 17–12. Drive: 9 plays, 44 yards, 3:54.

Fourth quarter

- SEA – Olindo Mare 23-yard field goal, 11:27. Seahawks 20–12. Drive: 4 plays, 6 yards, 0:59.
- SDG – Antonio Gates 12-yard pass from Philip Rivers (Legedu Naanee pass from Philip Rivers), 6:39. Tied 20–20. Drive: 9 plays, 65 yards, 4:48.
- SEA – Leon Washington 99-yard kickoff return (Olindo Mare kick), 6:24. Seahawks 27–20. Drive: 0 plays, 0 yards, 0:15.

Top passers

- SDG – Philip Rivers – 29/53, 455 yards, 2 TD, 2 INT
- SEA – Matt Hasselbeck – 19/32, 220 yards, TD, INT

Top rushers

- SDG – Mike Tolbert – 17 rushes, 73 yards
- SEA – Justin Forsett – 17 rushes, 63 yards

Top receivers

- SDG – Antonio Gates – 7 receptions, 109 yards, TD
- SEA – John Carlson – 5 receptions, 61 yards, TD

Top tacklers

- SDG – Eric Weddle – 6 tackles
- SEA – Lawyer Milloy – 6 tackles, 5 assists

Coming off their win over the Jaguars the Chargers flew to Qwest Field where they played their former division rival, the Seattle Seahawks. In the second quarter San Diego trailed early when kicker Olindo Mare made a 23-yard field goal. Then QB Matt Hasselbeck completed a 9-yard TD pass to TE John Carlson. This was followed in the third quarter by RB Leon Washington returning the 2nd-half kickoff 101 yards to the endzone for a touchdown. The Chargers cut the lead with QB Philip Rivers getting a 3-yard TD pass to WR Malcolm Floyd, followed by Hasselbeck getting sacked by ILB Brandon Siler in the endzone for a safety. Then kicker Nate Kaeding made a 29-yard field goal. The Seahawks increased their lead when Mare made a 23-yard field goal, but the Chargers replied and tied the game when Rivers found TE Antonio Gates on a 12-yard TD pass. (With a successful 2-point conversion as Rivers found WR Legedu Naanee). Before the clock struck zero Seattle took the winning score as RB Leon Washington returned his second kickoff of the game into the endzone running 99 yards for a touchdown, giving the Chargers the loss.

With the loss, San Diego fell to 1–2.

==== Week 4: vs. Arizona Cardinals ====
Week Four: Arizona Cardinals at San Diego Chargers – Game summary

Quarter	1	2	3	4	Total
Cardinals	0	7	0	3	10
Chargers	7	21	10	3	41

at Qualcomm Stadium, San Diego, California

- Date: October 3
- Game time: 1:15 p.m. PDT
- Game weather: 72 °F (22 °C) (Sunny)
- Game attendance: 62,189
- Referee: Gene Steratore
- TV announcers (Fox): Sam Rosen, Tim Ryan and Chris Myers (blacked out locally)
- Recap

Game information

First quarter

- SDG – Antonio Gates 33-yard pass from Philip Rivers (Nate Kaeding kick), 4:45. Chargers 7–0. Drive: 8 plays, 89 yards, 4:45.

Second quarter

- ARI – Kerry Rhodes 42-yard fumble return (Jay Feely kick), 13:34. Tied 7–7.
- SDG – Mike Tolbert 5-yard run (Nate Kaeding kick), 10:31. Chargers 14–7. Drive: 5 plays, 63 yards, 3:03.
- SDG – Antonio Gates 26-yard pass from Philip Rivers (Nate Kaeding kick), 3:30. Chargers 21–7. Drive: 9 plays, 65 yards, 4:14.
- SDG – Shaun Phillips 31-yard interception return (Nate Kaeding kick), 2:30. Chargers 28–7.

Third quarter

- SDG – Nate Kaeding 48-yard field goal, 3:55. Chargers 31–7. Drive: 6 plays, 32 yards, 3:41.
- SDG – Ryan Mathews 15-yard run (Nate Kaeding kick), 1:31. Chargers 38–7. Drive: 1 play, 15 yards, 0:07.

Fourth quarter

- SDG – Nate Kaeding 47-yard field goal, 10:49. Chargers 41–7. Drive: 8 plays, 35 yards, 4:11.
- ARI – Jay Feely 53-yard field goal, 3:17. Chargers 41–10. Drive: 8 plays, 29 yards, 4:05.

Top passers

- ARI – Max Hall – 8/14, 82 yards
- SDG – Philip Rivers – 15/20, 241 yards, 2 TD

Top rushers

- ARI – Tim Hightower – 7 rushes, 24 yards
- SDG – Mike Tolbert – 16 rushes, 100 yards, TD

Top receivers

- ARI – Larry Fitzgerald – 7 receptions, 56 yards
- SDG – Antonio Gates – 7 receptions, 144 yards, 2 TD

Top tacklers

- ARI – Paris Lenon – 8 tackles, 3 assists
- SDG – Kevin Burnett – 7 tackles, 1 assist, 2 sacks, 1 forced fumble

Hoping to rebound from their loss to the Seahawks the Chargers played on home ground for an inter-conference duel with the Cardinals. In the 1st quarter the Chargers took the early lead as QB Philip Rivers completed a 33-yard TD pass to TE Antonio Gates, but had a problem maintaining this lead in the 2nd quarter when FS Kerry Rhodes recovered a fumble and ran 2 yards to the endzone for a touchdown. After that, the Chargers went on a scoring rally with FB Mike Tolbert making a 5-yard TD run, followed by Rivers making a 26-yard TD pass to TE Antonio Gates. Then OLB Shaun Phillips successfully caught an interception and ran 31 yards to the endzone for a touchdown. This was followed in the 3rd quarter by kicker Nate Kaeding making a 48-yard field goal. Then RB Ryan Mathews got a 15-yard TD run. This was followed in the 4th quarter by Kaeding nailing a 47-yard field goal. The Cardinals tried to cut the lead, but only came away with kicker Jay Feely's 53-yard field goal.

With the win, San Diego improved to 2–2.

==== Week 5: at Oakland Raiders ====
Week Five: San Diego Chargers at Oakland Raiders – Game summary

Quarter	1	2	3	4	Total
Chargers	0	17	7	3	27
Raiders	12	3	7	13	35

at Oakland–Alameda County Coliseum, Oakland, California

- Date: October 10
- Game time: 1:15 p.m. PDT
- Game weather: (Clear)
- Game attendance: 48,279
- Referee: Clete Blakeman
- TV announcers (CBS): Kevin Harlan and Solomon Wilcots
- Recap

Game information

First quarter

- OAK – Safety, Rock Cartwright blocked punt through end zone, 13:56. Raiders 2–0.
- OAK – Sebastian Janikowski 50-yard field goal, 12:03. Raiders 5–0. Drive: 5 plays, 18 yards, 1:53.
- OAK – Hiram Eugene 5-yard return of blocked punt (Sebastian Janikowski kick), 10:33. Raiders 12–0.

Second quarter

- SDG – Antonio Gates 19-yard pass from Philip Rivers (Nate Kaeding kick), 10:07. Raiders 12–7. Drive: 8 plays, 77 yards, 4:01.
- SDG – Mike Tolbert 4-yard run (Nate Kaeding kick), 4:49. Chargers 14–12. Drive: 8 plays, 81 yards, 4:08.
- OAK – Sebastian Janikowski 30-yard field goal, 0:58. Raiders 15–14. Drive: 12 plays, 55 yards, 3:51.
- SDG – Nate Kaeding 43-yard field goal, 0:01. Chargers 17–15. Drive: 6 plays, 45 yards, 0:57.

Third quarter

- SDG – Malcom Floyd 41-yard pass from Philip Rivers (Nate Kaeding kick), 7:38. Chargers 24–15. Drive: 2 plays, 63 yards, 0:42.
- OAK – Zach Miller 1-yard pass from Jason Campbell (Sebastian Janikowski kick), 1:12. Chargers 24–22. Drive: 12 plays, 97 yards, 6:26.

Fourth quarter

- SDG – Nate Kaeding 34-yard field goal, 12:00. Chargers 27–22. Drive: 9 plays, 63 yards, 4:12.
- OAK – Michael Bush 3-yard run (pass failed), 3:39. Raiders 28–27. Drive: 14 plays, 73 yards, 8:21.
- OAK – Tyvon Branch 64-yard fumble return (Sebastian Janikowski kick), 0:58. Raiders 35–27.

Top passers

- SDG – Philip Rivers – 27/42, 431 yards, 2 TD
- OAK – Jason Campbell – 13/18, 159 yards, TD

Top rushers

- SDG – Ryan Mathews – 9 rushes, 59 yards
- OAK – Michael Bush – 26 rushes, 104 yards, TD

Top receivers

- SDG – Malcom Floyd – 8 receptions, 213 yards, TD
- OAK – Zach Miller – 6 receptions, 62 yards, TD

Top tacklers

- SDG – Paul Oliver – 6 tackles, 2 assists
- OAK – Michael Huff – 9 tackles, 2 assists, 1 sack, 1 forced fumble

Coming off their win over the Cardinals the Chargers flew to Oakland–Alameda County Coliseum for an AFC West division rivalry match against the Raiders. In the first quarter the Chargers' offense had problems when after a three-and-out Mike Scifres' punt was blocked by RB Rock Cartwright out of bounds in the end zone for a safety. Then kicker Sebastian Janikowski made a 50-yard field goal. Then Scifres' punt was blocked again and returned by FS Hiram Eugene 5 yards to the endzone for a touchdown. The Chargers then fought back and took the lead with QB Philip Rivers completing a 19-yard TD pass to TE Antonio Gates. Then RB Mike Tolbert got a 4-yard TD run. Then the Chargers trailed with Janikowski making a 30-yard field goal. But they responded and got the lead back with kicker Nate Kaeding making a 43-yard field goal, followed in the third quarter by Rivers making a 41-yard TD pass to WR Malcolm Floyd. The Raiders replied with QB Jason Campbell completing a 1-yard TD pass to TE Zach Miller. Followed in the 4th quarter by Kaeding making a 34-yard field goal. The Chargers fell behind when RB Michael Bush got a 3-yard touchdown run (with a failed 2-point conversion), followed by SS Tyvon Branch recovering a fumble and running 64 yards to the endzone for a touchdown to ice the game.

With the loss, San Diego fell to 2–3 for the 4th straight season. It was also the first time the Chargers had lost to the Raiders since 2003, ending a 13-game winning streak in the rivalry between the teams.

==== Week 6: at St. Louis Rams ====
Week Six: San Diego Chargers at St. Louis Rams – Game summary

Quarter	1	2	3	4	Total
Chargers	0	3	7	7	17
Rams	10	7	0	3	20

at Edward Jones Dome, St. Louis, Missouri

- Date: October 17
- Game time: 12:00 p.m. CDT
- Game weather: None (dome stadium)
- Game attendance: 52,472
- Referee: Scott Green
- TV announcers (CBS): Don Criqui and Steve Beuerlein
- Recap

Game information

First quarter

- STL – Josh Brown 39-yard field goal, 9:31. Rams 3–0. Drive: 8 plays, 30 yards, 2:39.
- STL – Danario Alexander 38-yard pass from Sam Bradford (Josh Brown kick), 0:43. Rams 10–0. Drive: 5 plays, 80 yards, 2:31.

Second quarter

- STL – Steven Jackson 7-yard run (Josh Brown kick), 1:39. Rams 17–0. Drive: 17 plays, 67 yards, 7:58.
- SDG – Nate Kaeding 41-yard field goal, 0:23. Rams 17–3. Drive: 8 plays, 53 yards, 1:16.

Third quarter

- SDG – Mike Tolbert 1-yard run (Nate Kaeding kick), 4:41. Rams 17–10. Drive: 11 plays, 68 yards, 5:48.

Fourth quarter

- STL – Josh Brown 48-yard field goal, 3:56. Rams 20–10. Drive: 8 plays, 32 yards, 4:15.
- SDG – Buster Davis 5-yard pass from Philip Rivers (Nate Kaeding kick), 3:16. Rams 20–17. Drive: 5 plays, 76 yards, 0:40.

Top passers

- SDG – Philip Rivers – 22/37, 249 yards, TD, INT
- STL – Sam Bradford – 18/31, 198 yards, TD

Top rushers

- SDG – Ryan Mathews – 12 rushes, 64 yards
- STL – Steven Jackson – 29 rushes, 109 yards

Top receivers

- SDG – Patrick Crayton – 6 receptions, 117 yards
- STL – Danario Alexander – 4 receptions, 72 yards, TD

Top tacklers

- SDG – Eric Weddle – 11 tackles, 1 assist
- STL – Bradley Fletcher – 7 tackles

Hoping to rebound from their loss to the Raiders the Chargers flew to Edward Jones Dome for an Interconference duel with the Rams. In the first quarter San Diego trailed early as kicker Josh Brown made a 39-yard field goal, followed by QB Sam Bradford completing a 38-yard TD pass to WR Danario Alexander. The Chargers struggled further in the 2nd quarter when RB Steven Jackson got a 7-yard TD run. The Chargers replied with kicker Nate Kaeding nailing a 41-yard field goal, followed in the third quarter by FB Mike Tolbert getting a 1-yard TD run. In the 4th quarter the Rams' lead increased when Josh Brown hit a 48-yard field goal, but was cut when QB Philip Rivers made a 5-yard TD pass to WR Buster Davis.

With the loss, San Diego fell to 2–4 and surpassed their 2009 loss total.

==== Week 7: vs. New England Patriots ====
Week Seven: New England Patriots at San Diego Chargers – Game summary

Quarter	1	2	3	4	Total
Patriots	7	6	7	3	23
Chargers	3	0	0	17	20

at Qualcomm Stadium, San Diego, California

- Date: October 24
- Game time: 1:15 p.m. PDT
- Game weather: 63 °F (17 °C) (Sunny)
- Game attendance: 68,836
- Referee: Tony Corrente
- TV announcers (CBS): Jim Nantz and Phil Simms
- Recap

Game information

First quarter

- SDG – Kris Brown 32-yard field goal, 5:23. Chargers 3–0. Drive: 11 plays, 36 yards, 1:45.
- NE – Rob Gronkowski 1-yard pass from Tom Brady (Stephen Gostkowski kick), 1:00. Patriots 7–3. Drive: 5 plays, 22 yards, 2:24.

Second quarter

- NE – Stephen Gostkowski 40-yard field goal, 6:51. Patriots 10–3. Drive: 4 plays, −14 yards, 1:54.
- NE – Stephen Gostkowski 35-yard field goal, 0:23. Patriots 13–3. Drive: 8 plays, 35 yards, 1:36.

Third quarter

- NE – BenJarvus Green-Ellis 1-yard run (Stephen Gostkowski kick), 6:25. Patriots 20–3. Drive: 17 plays, 79 yards, 8:35.

Fourth quarter

- SDG – Kris Brown 28-yard field goal, 14:56. Patriots 20–6. Drive: 12 plays, 64 yards, 6:29.
- NE – Stephen Gostkowski 35-yard field goal, 11:27. Patriots 23–6. Drive: 9 plays, 59 yards, 3:29.
- SDG – Antonio Gates 4-yard pass from Philip Rivers (Kris Brown kick), 7:21. Patriots 23–13. Drive: 11 plays, 67 yards, 4:06.
- SDG – Mike Tolbert 1-yard run (Kris Brown kick), 4:01. Patriots 23–20. Drive: 9 plays, 60 yards, 3:20.

Top passers

- NE – Tom Brady – 19/32, 159 yards, TD
- SDG – Philip Rivers – 34/50, 336 yards, TD, INT

Top rushers

- NE – BenJarvus Green-Ellis – 11 rushes, 24 yards, TD
- SDG – Ryan Mathews – 8 rushes, 15 yards

Top receivers

- NE – Aaron Hernandez – 5 receptions, 54 yards
- SDG – Patrick Crayton – 7 receptions, 82 yards

Top tacklers

- NE – Jerod Mayo – 10 tackles, 1 assist
- SDG – Stephen Cooper – 9 tackles

Hoping to break their current losing streak the Chargers played on home ground for an AFC duel with the Patriots. In the 1st quarter the Chargers took the lead as kicker Kris Brown made a 32-yard field goal, but they fell behind with QB Tom Brady making a 1-yard TD pass to TE Rob Gronkowski; followed in the second quarter by kicker Stephen Gostkowski getting a 40 and a 35-yard field goal. In the third quarter the Chargers continued to struggle with RB BenJarvus Green-Ellis getting a 1-yard TD run. In the fourth quarter the Chargers replied with Brown making a 28-yard field goal, but the Patriots continued to score with a 35-yard field goal from Gostkowski. The Chargers tried to cut the lead with QB Philip Rivers making a 4-yard TD pass to TE Antonio Gates, and with FB Mike Tolbert making a 1-yard TD run, but the Chargers got called for false start which turned a 45yd FG into a 50yd, and Kris Brown missed on the final play.

With the loss, San Diego fell to 2–5.

==== Week 8: vs. Tennessee Titans ====
Week Eight: Tennessee Titans at San Diego Chargers – Game summary

Quarter	1	2	3	4	Total
Titans	5	14	0	6	25
Chargers	7	7	10	9	33

at Qualcomm Stadium, San Diego, California

- Date: October 31
- Game time: 1:05 p.m. PDT
- Game weather: 65 °F (18 °C) (Sunny)
- Game attendance: 59,260
- Referee: Bill Leavy
- TV announcers (CBS): Ian Eagle and Dan Fouts
- Recap

Game information

First quarter

- TEN – Safety, Nick Schommer blocked punt through end zone, 13:31. Titans 2–0.
- SDG – Mike Tolbert 1-yard run (Kris Brown kick), 4:33. Chargers 7–2. Drive: 15 plays, 83 yards, 7:27.
- TEN – Rob Bironas 21-yard field goal, 0:17. Chargers 7–5. Drive: 10 plays, 68 yards, 4:16.

Second quarter

- TEN – Craig Stevens 1-yard pass from Vince Young (Rob Bironas kick), 8:08. Titans 12–7. Drive: 8 plays, 80 yards, 4:10.
- TEN – Chris Johnson 29-yard run (Rob Bironas kick), 4:43. Titans 19–7. Drive: 3 plays, 74 yards, 1:38.
- SDG – Ryan Mathews 7-yard run (Kris Brown kick), 1:55. Titans 19–14. Drive: 5 plays, 72 yards, 2:48.

Third quarter

- SDG – Kris Brown 34-yard field goal, 7:45. Titans 19–17. Drive: 11 plays, 47 yards, 6:04.
- SDG – Antonio Gates 48-yard pass from Philip Rivers (Kris Brown kick), 4:20. Chargers 24–19. Drive: 4 plays, 91 yards, 1:52.

Fourth quarter

- SDG – Kris Brown 36-yard field goal, 12:01. Chargers 27–19. Drive: 9 plays, 73 yards, 5:51.
- TEN – Nate Washington 71-yard pass from Vince Young (pass failed), 11:43. Chargers 27–25. Drive: 1 play, 71 yards, 0:18.
- SDG – Darren Sproles 13-yard pass from Philip Rivers (kick aborted), 6:51. Chargers 33–25. Drive: 8 plays, 52 yards, 4:52.

Top passers

- TEN – Vince Young – 10/21, 253 yards, 2 TD
- SDG – Philip Rivers – 27/36, 305 yards, 2 TD, INT

Top rushers

- TEN – Chris Johnson – 15 rushes, 59 yards, TD
- SDG – Mike Tolbert – 11 rushes, 63 yards, TD

Top receivers

- TEN – Nate Washington – 4 receptions, 117 yards, TD
- SDG – Antonio Gates – 5 receptions, 123 yards, TD

Top tacklers

- TEN – Gerald McRath – 10 tackles
- SDG – Eric Weddle – 10 tackles, 1 assist

Hoping to break their current losing streak the Chargers played on home ground for an AFC duel with the Titans. In the first quarter the Chargers trailed early when the Chargers' punt was blocked by Nick Schommer out of bounds for a safety. The Chargers replied with FB Mike Tolbert getting a 1-yard TD run. The Chargers fell behind with kicker Rob Bironas nailing a 21-yard field goal, followed in the second quarter by QB Vince Young completing a 1-yard TD pass to TE Craig Stevens. The Chargers struggled further with RB Chris Johnson getting a 29-yard TD run. The Chargers then went on a scoring rally with RB Ryan Mathews making a 7-yard TD run, followed in the third quarter by kicker Kris Brown making a 34-yard field goal. Then QB Philip Rivers completed a 48-yard TD pass to TE Antonio Gates, and then Brown made a 36-yard field goal. The lead was narrowed with Young finding WR Nate Washington on a 71-yard TD pass (with a failed 2-point conversion), but couldn't do anything after Rivers got a 13-yard TD pass to RB Darren Sproles (PAT aborted).

With the win, the Chargers improve to 3–5.

==== Week 9: at Houston Texans ====
Week Nine: San Diego Chargers at Houston Texans – Game summary

Quarter	1	2	3	4	Total
Chargers	14	0	7	8	29
Texans	10	10	3	0	23

at Reliant Stadium, Houston, Texas

- Date: November 7
- Game time: 12:00 p.m. CST
- Game weather: 63 °F (17 °C) (Sunny)
- Game attendance: 70,886
- Referee: Mike Carey
- TV announcers (CBS): Ian Eagle and Dan Fouts
- Recap

Game information

First quarter

- HOU – Arian Foster 8-yard run (Neil Rackers kick), 13:06. Texans 7–0. Drive: 1 play, 8 yards, 0:04.
- SDG – Seyi Ajirotutu 55-yard pass from Philip Rivers (Kris Brown kick), 9:28. Tied 7–7. Drive: 6 plays, 78 yards, 3:38.
- HOU – Neil Rackers 27-yard field goal, 4:47. Texans 10–7. Drive: 10 plays, 64 yards, 4:41.
- SDG – Randy McMichael 11-yard pass from Philip Rivers (Kris Brown kick), 1:08. Chargers 14–10. Drive: 6 plays, 80 yards, 3:39.

Second quarter

- HOU – Arian Foster 2-yard run (Neil Rackers kick), 10:23. Texans 17–14. Drive: 8 plays, 44 yards, 3:49.
- HOU – Neil Rackers 21-yard field goal, 0:22. Texans 20–14. Drive: 12 plays, 87 yards, 6:16.

Third quarter

- HOU – Neil Rackers 25-yard field goal, 8:55. Texans 23–14. Drive: 11 plays, 66 yards, 6:05.
- SDG – Randy McMichael 12-yard pass from Philip Rivers (Kris Brown kick), 5:48. Texans 23–21. Drive: 7 plays, 74 yards, 3:07.

Fourth quarter

- SDG – Seyi Ajirotutu 28-yard pass from Philip Rivers (Mike Tolbert run), 5:17. Chargers 29–23. Drive: 7 plays, 65 yards, 4:14.

Top passers

- SDG – Philip Rivers – 17/23, 295 yards, 4 TD, INT
- HOU – Matt Schaub – 21/32, 267 yards, INT

Top rushers

- SDG – Ryan Mathews – 9 rushes, 42 yards
- HOU – Arian Foster – 27 rushes, 127 yards, 2 TD

Top receivers

- SDG – Seyi Ajirotutu – 4 receptions, 111 yards, 2 TD
- HOU – Arian Foster – 4 receptions, 70 yards

Top tacklers

- SDG – Antoine Cason, Eric Weddle – 7 tackles, 1 assist
- HOU – Bernard Pollard – 8 tackles, 1 forced fumble

Hoping to increase their winning streak the Chargers moved to Reliant Stadium for an AFC duel with the Texans. In the first quarter the Chargers trailed early as RB Arian Foster got an 8-yard TD run. They soon replied with QB Philip Rivers making a 55-yard TD pass to WR Seyi Ajirotutu. They trailed again with kicker Neil Rackers nailed a 27-yard field goal, but took the lead after Rivers got an 11-yard TD pass to TE Randy McMichael. They fell behind again in the second quarter as Foster made a 2-yard TD run, followed by Rackers hitting a 21 and a 25-yard field goal. The Chargers eventually pulled themselves in front again, with Rivers finding McMichael again on a 12-yard TD pass. This was followed in the 4th quarter by Rivers' 28-yard TD pass to Ajirotutu (With a successful 2-point conversion as FB Mike Tolbert ran to the endzone).

With the win, the Chargers went into their bye week at 4–5.

==== Week 11: Denver Broncos ====
Week Eleven: Denver Broncos at San Diego Chargers – Game summary

Quarter	1	2	3	4	Total
Broncos	7	0	0	7	14
Chargers	7	14	7	7	35

at Qualcomm Stadium, San Diego, California

- Date: November 22
- Game time: 5:30 p.m. PST
- Game weather: 55 °F (13 °C), partly cloudy
- Game attendance: 68,482
- Referee: Jeff Triplette
- TV announcers (ESPN): Mike Tirico, Ron Jaworski, Jon Gruden, Michele Tafoya and Suzy Kolber
- Game Book, Recap

Game information

First quarter

- DEN – Knowshon Moreno 4-yard run (Matt Prater kick), 12:05. Broncos 7–0. Drive: 6 plays, 69 yards, 2:55.
- SDG – Malcom Floyd 6-yard pass from Philip Rivers (Nate Kaeding kick), 2:14. Tied 7–7. Drive: 12 plays, 70 yards, 6:26.

Second quarter

- SDG – Mike Tolbert 1-yard run (Nate Kaeding kick), 7:58. Chargers 14–7. Drive: 6 plays, 87 yards, 2:38.
- SDG – Patrick Crayton 40-yard pass from Philip Rivers (Nate Kaeding kick), 2:05. Chargers 21–7. Drive: 2 plays, 54 yards, 0:54.

Third quarter

- SDG – Darren Sproles 57-yard pass from Philip Rivers (Nate Kaeding kick), 12:36. Chargers 28–7. Drive: 5 plays, 72 yards, 2:24.

Fourth quarter

- SDG – Jacob Hester 3-yard pass from Philip Rivers (Nate Kaeding kick), 14:16. Chargers 35–7. Drive: 11 plays, 53 yards, 6:29.
- DEN – Brandon Lloyd 13-yard pass from Kyle Orton (Matt Prater kick), 8:48. Chargers 35–14. Drive: 6 plays, 39 yards, 2:39.

Top passers

- DEN – Kyle Orton – 24/38, 217 yards, TD, INT
- SDG – Philip Rivers – 15/24, 233 yards, 4 TD, INT

Top rushers

- DEN – Knowshon Moreno – 13 rushes, 58 yards, TD
- SDG – Mike Tolbert – 25 rushes, 111 yards, TD

Top receivers

- DEN – Brandon Lloyd – 6 receptions, 78 yards, TD
- SDG – Patrick Crayton – 3 receptions, 105 yards, TD

Top tacklers

- DEN – Joe Mays – 6 tackles, 3 assists
- SDG – Antoine Cason – 7 tackles, 2 assists, 1 interception

Coming off their bye week, the Chargers went home for a Week 11 AFC West duel with the Denver Broncos on Monday night. San Diego trailed early in the first quarter as Broncos running back Knowshon Moreno got a 4-yard touchdown run. The Chargers answered with quarterback Philip Rivers finding wide receiver Malcolm Floyd on a 6-yard touchdown pass. San Diego took the lead in the second quarter with a 1-yard touchdown run from fullback Mike Tolbert, followed by Rivers finding wide receiver Patrick Crayton on a 40-yard touchdown pass.

The Chargers added onto their lead in the third quarter as Rivers connected with running back Darren Sproles on a 57-yard touchdown pass. San Diego continued its dominating night with Rivers' 3-yard touchdown pass to fullback Jacob Hester. Denver would close out the game with quarterback Kyle Orton completing a 13-yard touchdown pass to wide receiver Brandon Lloyd.

With the win, the Chargers improved to 5–5.

==== Week 12: at Indianapolis Colts ====
Week Twelve: San Diego Chargers at Indianapolis Colts – Game summary

Quarter	1	2	3	4	Total
Chargers	10	6	10	10	36
Colts	7	7	0	0	14

at Lucas Oil Stadium; Indianapolis, Indiana

- Date: November 28
- Game time: 8:30 p.m. EST
- Game weather: Roof closed, retractable roof stadium
- Game attendance: 67,471
- Referee: Pete Morelli
- TV announcers (NBC): Al Michaels, Cris Collinsworth, & Andrea Kremer
- Recap

Game information

First quarter

- IND – Jacob Tamme 4-yard reception from Peyton Manning (Adam Vinatieri kick), 9:16. Colts 7–0. Drive: 12 plays, 78 yards, 5:44.
- SDG – Nate Kaeding 28-yard field goal, 3:22. Colts 7–3. Drive: 10 plays, 45 yards, 5:54.
- SDG – Kevin Burnett 29-yard interception return (Nate Kaeding kick), 2:00. Chargers 10–7.

Second quarter

- SDG – Nate Kaeding 33-yard field goal, 10:04. Chargers 13–7. Drive: 9 plays, 45 yards, 4:46.
- SDG – Nate Kaeding 50-yard field goal, 4:39. Chargers 16–7. Drive: 5 plays, 26 yards, 2:27.
- IND – Blair White 6-yard reception from Peyton Manning (Adam Vinatieri kick), 0:22. Chargers 16–14. Drive: 5 plays, 65 yards, 1:14.

Third quarter

- SDG – Nate Kaeding 30-yard field goal, 9:18. Chargers 19–14. Drive: 10 plays, 55 yards, 5:42.
- SDG – Eric Weddle 41-yard interception return (Nate Kaeding kick), 8:21. Chargers 26–14.

Fourth quarter

- SDG – Mike Tolbert 3-yard run (Nate Kaeding kick), 11:26. Chargers 33–14. Drive: 10 plays, 61 yards, 6:01.
- SDG – Nate Kaeding 20-yard field goal, 5:25. Chargers 36–14. Drive: 8 plays, 31 yards, 5:12.

Top passers

- SDG – Philip Rivers – 19/23, 185 yards
- IND – Peyton Manning – 31/48, 285 yards, 2 TD, 4 INT

Top rushers

- SDG – Mike Tolbert – 26 rushes, 103 yards, TD
- IND – Donald Brown – 11 rushes, 24 yards

Top receivers

- SDG – Antonio Gates – 4 receptions, 46 yards
- IND – Pierre Garçon – 5 receptions, 72 yards

Top tacklers

- SDG – Kevin Burnett – 9 tackles, 1 assist, 1 interception
- IND – Pat Angerer – 7 tackles, 4 assists

The Chargers' eleventh game was an AFC duel against the Colts at Lucas Oil Stadium. They trailed early in the first quarter after QB Peyton Manning made a 4-yard TD pass to TE Jacob Tamme. They eventually pulled ahead after kicker Nate Kaeding made a 28-yard field goal, followed by ILB Kevin Burnett returning an interception 29 yards for a touchdown, and then with Kaeding hitting a 33 and a 50-yard field goal. Their lead was narrowed when Manning made a 6-yard TD pass to WR Blair White, but the Chargers controlled the second half with Kaeding getting a 30-yard field goal, which was shortly followed by FS Eric Weddle returning an interception 41 yards for a touchdown, then with FB Mike Tolbert getting a 3-yard TD run, and Kaeding making a 20-yard field goal, settling both teams records to 6–5.

==== Week 13: vs. Oakland Raiders ====
Week Thirteen: Oakland Raiders at San Diego Chargers – Game summary

Quarter	1	2	3	4	Total
Raiders	14	7	0	7	28
Chargers	0	3	3	7	13

at Qualcomm Stadium, San Diego, California

- Date: December 5
- Game time: 1:05 p.m. PST
- Game weather: 67 °F (19 °C) (Cloudy and Sun)
- Game attendance: 68,163
- Referee: John Parry
- TV announcers (CBS): Jim Nantz and Dan Fouts
- Gamebook Recap

Game information

First quarter

- OAK – Jason Campbell 9-yard run (Sebastian Janikowski kick) 8:35. Raiders 7–0. Drive:4 plays, 18 yards, 2:10.
- OAK – Jacoby Ford 4-yard pass from Jason Campbell (Sebastian Janikowski kick), 0:30. Raiders 14–0. Drive: 11 plays, 41 yards, 6:36.

Second quarter

- SDG – Nate Kaeding 39-yard field goal, 11:05. Raiders 14–3. Drive: 9 plays, 48 yards, 4:25.
- OAK – Michael Bush 7-yard run (Sebastian Janikowski kick), 4:07. Raiders 21–3. Drive: 11 plays, 80 yards, 6:58.

Third quarter

- SDG – Nate Kaeding 33-yard field goal, 0:44. Raiders 21–6. Drive: 9 plays, 68 yards, 3:21.

Fourth quarter

- SDG – Antonio Gates 4-yard pass from Philip Rivers (Nate Kaeding kick), 9:59. Raiders 21–13.Drive: 6 plays, 80 yards, 2:45.
- OAK – Darren McFadden 7-yard run (Sebastian Janikowski kick), 4:35. Raiders 28–13. Drive: 7 plays, 62 yards, 5:24.

Top passers

- OAK – Jason Campbell – 10/16, 117 yards, TD
- SDG – Philip Rivers – 23/39, 280 yards, TD, INT

Top rushers

- OAK – Darren McFadden – 19 rushes, 97 yards, TD
- SDG – Mike Tolbert – 7 rushes, 16 yards

Top receivers

- OAK – Marcel Reece – 3 receptions, 42 yards
- SDG – Antonio Gates – 6 receptions, 73 yards, TD

Top tacklers

- OAK – Rolando McClain – 7 tackles
- SDG – Brandon Siler – 9 tackles, 3 assists

Coming off their win over the Colts the Chargers played on home ground for a rematch against the Raiders. The Chargers trailed early as QB Jason Campbell scrambled 9 yards for a touchdown, followed by his 4-yard TD pass to WR Jacoby Ford. They replied in the second quarter as kicker Nate Kaeding nailed a 39-yard field goal, but trailed further with RB Michael Bush getting a 7-yard TD run. The Chargers cut the lead with Kaeding hitting a 33-yard field goal, followed by QB Philip Rivers completing a 4-yard TD pass to TE Antonio Gates. The Raiders would finish off with Darren McFadden making a 7-yard TD run.

With the loss, San Diego fell to 6–6 and were swept by the Raiders for the first time since 2001.

==== Week 14: vs. Kansas City Chiefs ====
Week Fourteen: Kansas City Chiefs at San Diego Chargers – Game summary

Quarter	1	2	3	4	Total
Chiefs	0	0	0	0	0
Chargers	7	14	0	10	31

at Qualcomm Stadium, San Diego, California

- Date: December 12
- Game time: 1:15 p.m. PST
- Game weather: 86 °F (30 °C) (Sunny)
- Game attendance: 66,780
- Referee: Walt Anderson
- TV announcers (CBS): Gus Johnson and Steve Tasker
- Recap

Game information

First quarter

- SDG – Malcom Floyd 17-yard pass from Philip Rivers (Nate Kaeding kick), 5:33. Chargers 7–0. Drive: 10 plays, 67 yards, 6:10.

Second quarter

- SDG – Mike Tolbert 8-yard run (Nate Kaeding kick), 6:47. Chargers 14–0. Drive: 9 plays, 69 yards, 5:04.
- SDG – Malcom Floyd 9-yard pass from Philip Rivers (Nate Kaeding kick), 0:40. Chargers 21–0. Drive: 9 plays, 81 yards, 2:58.

Third quarter

- No scoring plays.

Fourth quarter

- SDG – Nate Kaeding 48-yard field goal, 8:25. Chargers 24–0. Drive: 10 plays, 42 yards, 5:38.
- SDG – Ryan Mathews 15-yard run (Nate Kaeding kick), 3:15. Chargers 31–0. Drive: 6 plays, 36 yards, 3:47.

Top passers

- KC – Brodie Croyle – 7/17, 40 yards
- SDG – Philip Rivers – 18/24, 226 yards, 2 TD, INT

Top rushers

- KC – Jamaal Charles – 10 rushes, 40 yards
- SDG – Mike Tolbert – 16 rushes, 66 yards, TD

Top receivers

- KC – Terrance Copper – 2 receptions, 15 yards
- SDG – Malcom Floyd – 4 receptions, 51 yards, 2 TD

Top tacklers

- KC – Derrick Johnson – 8 tackles, 1 assist
- SDG – Antwan Barnes – 4 tackles, 1 sack

Hoping to rebound from their loss to the Raiders the Chargers played on home ground for an AFC West rivalry rematch against the Chiefs. The Chargers took control of the game with QB Philip Rivers throwing a 17-yard TD pass to WR Malcolm Floyd, followed by FB Mike Tolbert getting an 8-yard TD run. The lead was increased with Rivers finding Floyd again on a 9-yard TD pass. This was followed in the fourth quarter by kicker Nate Kaeding nailing a 48-yard field goal, and then by RB Ryan Mathews getting a 15-yard TD run.

With the shutout win over Kansas City, San Diego improved to 7–6.

==== Week 15: vs. San Francisco 49ers ====
Week Fifteen: San Francisco 49ers at San Diego Chargers – Game summary

Quarter	1	2	3	4	Total
49ers	0	0	0	7	7
Chargers	7	10	7	10	34

at Qualcomm Stadium, San Diego, California

- Date: December 16
- Game time: 5:20 p.m. PST
- Game weather: 56 °F (13 °C) (Partly Cloudy)
- Game attendance: 67,820
- Referee: Clete Blakeman
- TV announcers (NFLN): Bob Papa, Matt Millen and Joe Theismann
- Recap

Game information

First quarter

- SDG – Vincent Jackson 58-yard pass from Philip Rivers (Nate Kaeding kick), 12:53. Chargers 7–0. Drive: 4 plays, 74 yards, 2:07.

Second quarter

- SDG – Nate Kaeding 25-yard field goal, 6:03. Chargers 10–0. Drive: 13 plays, 90 yards, 7:00.
- SDG – Vincent Jackson 11-yard pass from Philip Rivers (Nate Kaeding kick), 1:19. Chargers 17–0. Drive: 7 plays, 87 yards, 2:49.

Third quarter

- SDG – Mike Tolbert 1-yard run (Nate Kaeding kick), 4:52. Chargers 24–0.Drive: 14 plays, 58 yards, 8:12.

Fourth quarter

- SDG – Vincent Jackson 21-yard pass from Philip Rivers (Nate Kaeding kick), 12:06. Chargers 31–0. Drive: 10 plays, 69 yards, 6:16.
- SDG – Nate Kaeding 39-yard field goal, 7:38. Chargers 34–0. Drive: 5 plays, 14 yards, 1:56.
- SF – Brian Westbrook 3-yard run (Jeff Reed kick), 4:26. Chargers 34–7. Drive: 6 plays, 70 yards, 3:12.

Top passers

- SF – Alex Smith – 19/29, 165 yards, INT
- SDG – Philip Rivers – 19/25, 273 yards, 3 TD

Top rushers

- SF – Anthony Dixon – 6 rushes, 33 yards
- SDG – Ryan Mathews – 17 rushes, 56 yards

Top receivers

- SF – Josh Morgan – 7 receptions, 106 yards
- SDG – Vincent Jackson – 5 receptions, 112 yards, 3 TD

Top tacklers

- SF – Takeo Spikes – 7 tackles, 5 assists
- SDG – Kevin Burnett – 8 tackles, 1 sack

The Chargers' fourteenth game was an interconference duel with the 49ers which was played on Thursday Night. The Chargers took a quick lead with QB Philip Rivers throwing a 58-yard TD pass to WR Vincent Jackson. The lead was extended in the second quarter by kicker Nate Kaeding nailing a 25-yard field goal, followed by Rivers finding Jackson on an 11-yard touchdown pass. The Chargers continued to dominate with FB Mike Tolbert getting a 1-yard TD run, followed by Rivers connecting to Jackson on a 48-yard TD pass, then with Kaeding hitting a 39-yard field goal. The 49ers made their only score of the game with RB Brian Westbrook getting a 1-yard TD run.

This game was also a blowout and San Diego improved to 8–6.

==== Week 16: at Cincinnati Bengals ====
Week Sixteen: San Diego Chargers at Cincinnati Bengals – Game summary

Quarter	1	2	3	4	Total
Chargers	0	3	7	10	20
Bengals	7	6	0	21	34

at Paul Brown Stadium, Cincinnati, Ohio

- Date: December 26
- Game time: 4:05 p.m. EST
- Game weather: 25 °F (−4 °C) (Cloudy with flurries)
- Game attendance: 54,194
- Referee: Gene Steratore
- TV announcers (CBS): Gus Johnson and Steve Tasker
- Recap

Game information

First quarter

- CIN – Jermaine Gresham 3-yard pass from Carson Palmer (Clint Stitser kick), 10:19. Bengals 7–0. Drive: 5 plays, 32 yards, 2:40.

Second quarter

- CIN – Jerome Simpson 10-yard pass from Carson Palmer (kick failed), 12:54. Bengals 13–0. Drive: 8 plays, 59 yards, 4:47.
- SDG – Nate Kaeding 20-yard field goal, 1:15. Bengals 13–3. Drive: 12 plays, 73 yards, 6:19.

Third quarter

- SDG – Ryan Mathews 23-yard run (Nate Kaeding kick), 5:45. Bengals 13–10. Drive: 8 plays, 86 yards, 4:47.

Fourth quarter

- CIN – Jordan Shipley 3-yard pass from Carson Palmer (Clint Stitser kick), 13:00. Bengals 20–10. Drive: 4 plays, 21 yards, 2:00.
- SDG – Nate Kaeding 28-yard field goal, 7:18. Bengals 20–13. Drive: 12 plays, 47 yards, 5:42.
- CIN – Jerome Simpson 59-yard pass from Carson Palmer (Clint Stitser kick), 6:25. Bengals 27–13. Drive: 3 plays, 62 yards, 0:53.
- CIN – Bernard Scott 10-yard run (Clint Stitser kick), 3:54. Bengals 34–13. Drive: 3 plays, 26 yards, 1:33.
- SDG – Kelley Washington 5-yard pass from Philip Rivers (Nate Kaeding kick), 1:27. Bengals 34–20. Drive: 9 plays, 72 yards, 2:27.

Top passers

- SDG – Philip Rivers – 27/40, 256 yards, TD, INT
- CIN – Carson Palmer – 16/21, 269 yards, 4 TD

Top rushers

- SDG – Ryan Mathews – 12 rushes, 55 yards, TD
- CIN – Cedric Benson – 24 rushes, 52 yards

Top receivers

- SDG – Legedu Naanee – 4 receptions, 59 yards
- CIN – Jerome Simpson – 6 receptions, 124 yards, 2 TD

Top tacklers

- SDG – Eric Weddle – 11 tackles, 5 assists
- CIN – Dhani Jones – 5 tackles, 3 assists

Hoping to make it three straight the Chargers flew to Paul Brown Stadium for an AFC duel with the Bengals. In the first quarter the Chargers trailed early with QB Carson Palmer throwing a 3-yard TD pass to TE Jermaine Gresham. Then Palmer found WR Jerome Simpson on a 10-yard TD pass (PAT failed, wide left). The Chargers got on the board with kicker Nate Kaeding hitting a 20-yard field goal, followed by RB Ryan Mathews getting a 23-yard TD run, but went into more trouble as Palmer completed a 3-yard TD pass to WR Jordan Shipley. The Chargers cut the lead with Kaeding making a 28-yard field goal, but struggled to hold on after Palmer connected to Simpson on a 59-yard TD pass, followed by RB Bernard Scott getting a 10-yard TD run. The Chargers tried to come back after QB Philip Rivers made a 5-yard TD pass to WR Kelley Washington, but the Bengals defense prevented any more scoring chances.

With the loss, the Chargers fell to 8–7. With Kansas City winning earlier in the day, the loss prevented the Chargers from making their sixth playoff appearance in seven years.

==== Week 17: at Denver Broncos ====
Week Seventeen: San Diego Chargers at Denver Broncos – Game summary

Quarter	1	2	3	4	Total
Chargers	0	16	10	7	33
Broncos	7	0	7	14	28

at INVESCO Field at Mile High, Denver, Colorado

- Date: January 2
- Game time: 2:15 p.m. MST
- Game attendance: 74,155
- Referee: Walt Coleman
- TV announcers (CBS): Don Criqui and Steve Beuerlein
- Box score

Game information

First quarter

- DEN – Brandon Lloyd 14-yard pass from Tim Tebow (Stephen Hauschka kick), 2:57. Broncos 7–0. Drive: 6 plays, 40 yards, 2:42.

Second quarter

- SDG – Ryan Mathews 27-yard run (Nate Kaeding kick), 13:52. Tied 7–7. Drive: 8 plays, 76 yards, 4:05.
- SDG – Nate Kaeding 42-yard field goal, 9:59. Chargers 10–7. Drive: 7 plays, 26 yards, 2:11.
- SDG – Nate Kaeding 45-yard field goal, 3:45. Chargers 13–7. Drive: 10 plays, 56 yards, 5:05.
- SDG – Nate Kaeding 47-yard field goal, 0:09. Chargers 16–7. Drive: 10 plays, 54 yards, 1:33.

Third quarter

- SDG – Ryan Mathews 12-yard run (Nate Kaeding kick), 11:10. Chargers 23–7. Drive: 5 plays, 71 yards, 2:34.
- SDG – Nate Kaeding 37-yard field goal, 8:31. Chargers 26–7. Drive: 4 plays, 0 yards, 0:58.
- DEN – Eric Decker 6-yard pass from Tim Tebow (Stephen Hauschka kick), 3:15. Chargers 26–14. Drive: 11 plays, 83 yards, 5:16.

Fourth quarter

- SDG – Ryan Mathews 31-yard run (Nate Kaeding kick), 7:55. Chargers 33–14. Drive: 7 plays, 52 yards, 4:13.
- DEN – Cassius Vaughn 97-yard kickoff return (Stephen Hauschka kick), 7:42. Chargers 33–21. Drive: 0 plays, 0 yards, 0:13.
- DEN – Tim Tebow 6-yard run (Stephen Hauschka kick), 0:26. Chargers 33–28. Drive: 12 plays, 92 yards, 2:23.

Top passers

- SDG – Philip Rivers – 21/37, 313 yards, INT
- DEN – Tim Tebow – 16/36, 205 yards, 2 TD, 2 INT

Top rushers

- SDG – Ryan Mathews – 26 rushes, 120 yards, 3 TD
- DEN – Tim Tebow – 13 rushes, 94 yards, TD

Top receivers

- SDG – Legedu Naanee – 4 receptions, 79 yards
- DEN – Brandon Lloyd – 5 receptions, 73 yards, TD

Top tacklers

- SDG – Kevin Burnett – 7 tackles, 1 assist
- DEN – Mario Haggan – 9 tackles

The Chargers' final game was a division rivalry rematch against the Broncos. In the first quarter the Chargers trailed early as QB Tim Tebow threw a 14-yard TD pass to WR Brandon Lloyd. They eventually overcame this deficit with RB Ryan Mathews getting a 27-yard TD run, followed by kicker Nate Kaeding nailing a 42, 45 and 47-yard field goal to put the Chargers up 16–7. They extended their lead in the third quarter with Mathews getting a 12-yard TD run, followed by Kaeding hitting a 37-yard field goal. The lead was narrowed with QB Tim Tebow completing a 6-yard TD pass to WR Eric Decker, but the Chargers increased their lead with Mathews getting a 31-yard TD run. The lead was narrowed further with Cassius Vaughn returning the kickoff 97 yards for a touchdown, followed by Tebow scrambling 6 yards for a touchdown, but the Chargers still managed to hold on for the win. The Chargers finished the 2010–11 NFL season as the only team ever to rank first in overall offense (396 yds/g) and overall defense (272 yds/g), in terms of total yards gained and allowed, and not make the playoffs the same year. Since 1970 the previous four NFL teams to accomplish that statistical feat all qualified for the post-season in those respective years.

With the win against the Broncos, San Diego finished with a 9–7 record.

=== Standings ===
AFC West
	W	L	T	PCT	DIV	CONF	PF	PA	STK
^{(4)} Kansas City Chiefs	10	6	0	.625	2–4	6–6	366	326	L1
San Diego Chargers	9	7	0	.563	3–3	7–5	441	322	W1
Oakland Raiders	8	8	0	.500	6–0	6–6	410	371	W1
Denver Broncos	4	12	0	.250	1–5	3–9	344	471	L1

== Legacy ==
In 2019 SB Nation deemed the 2010 Chargers to be one of the greatest NFL teams of all time, despite missing the playoffs, if the special teams unit was excluded.
