= Legedu Naanee =

American football player (born 1983)

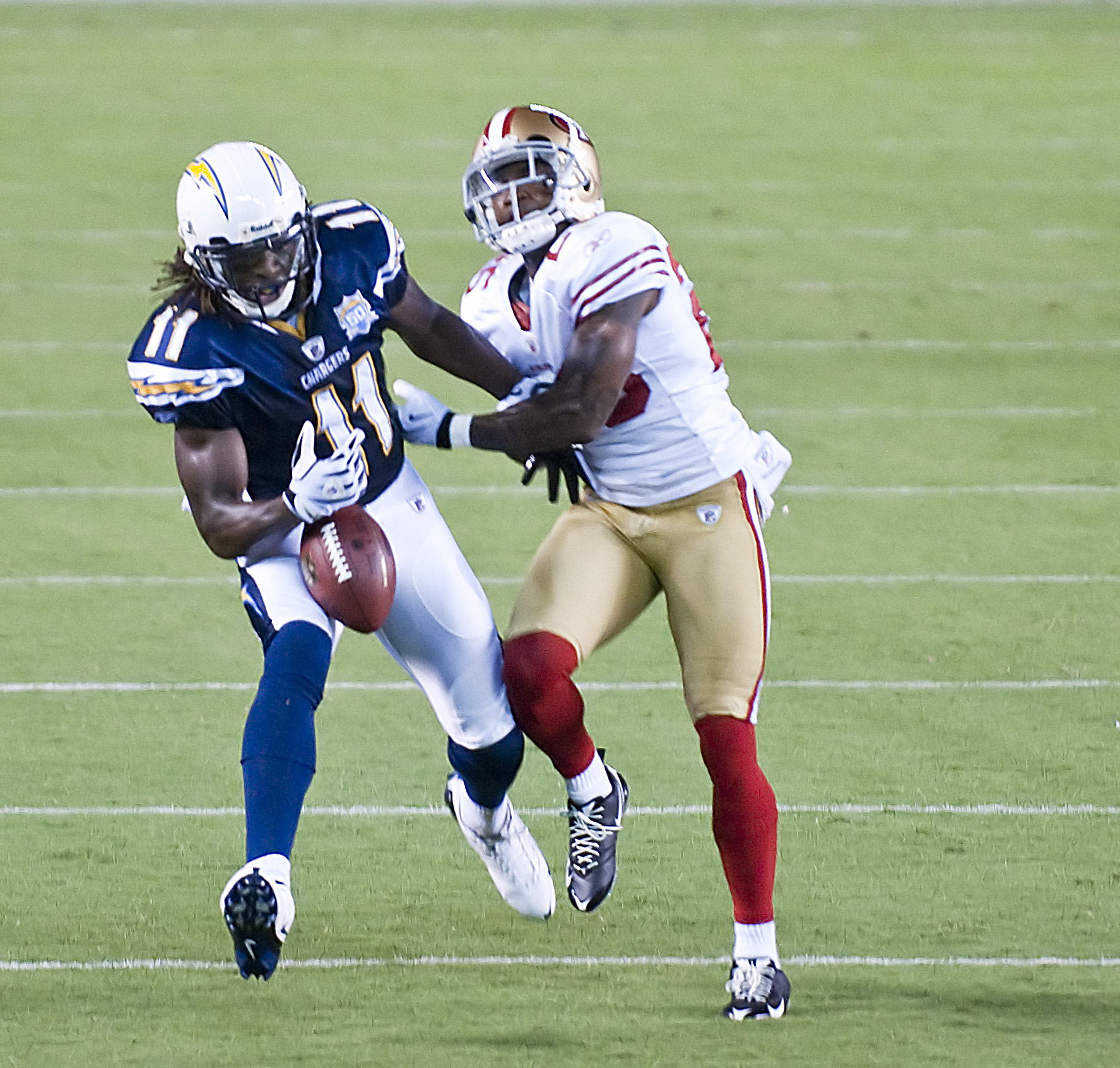
- Naanee (left) during the 2009 NFL preseason

No. 40, 11, 17, 19
- Position: Wide receiver

Personal information
- Born: September 16, 1983 (age 43); Portland, Oregon, U.S.
- Listed height: 6 ft 2 in (1.88 m)
- Listed weight: 225 lb (102 kg)

Career information
- High school: Franklin (Portland)
- College: Boise State
- NFL draft: 2007: 5th round, 172nd overall pick

Career history
- San Diego Chargers (2007–2010); Carolina Panthers (2011); Miami Dolphins (2012)

Career NFL statistics
- Receptions: 108
- Receiving yards: 1,232
- Receiving touchdowns: 4
- Stats at Pro Football Reference

Legedu A. Naanee (pronounced LEG-a-doo Nah-NAY, born September 16, 1983) is an American former professional football player who was a wide receiver in the National Football League (NFL). He played college football for the Boise State Broncos and was selected by the San Diego Chargers in the fifth round of the 2007 NFL draft. Naanee also played for the Carolina Panthers and the Miami Dolphins.

== Early life ==
Naanee attended Franklin High School in Portland, Oregon and was a student and a letterman in football, basketball, and baseball. In football, he was a four-year starter earning awards at quarterback and defensive back. In basketball, he won All-League honors as a junior.

== College career ==
Although Naanee received scholarship offers from many Pac-10 and Big 12 schools, such as Oregon and Oregon State, Naanee chose to play college football at Boise State University because they were the only major program to offer him a chance to play quarterback, a position he cherished and played in high school. After Jared Zabransky won the starting job in 2004, Naanee realized that if he wanted to play, it had to be at another position.

Naanee filled in at receiver and although the transition and failure at quarterback was difficult, he said being able to "feel like you were part of things and contributing, that went out the window". He remarked, "maybe it was something that was meant to be, for me to go through something like that and then to switch."

== Professional career ==
Pre-draft measurables
Height	Weight	40-yard dash	10-yard split	20-yard split	20-yard shuttle	Three-cone drill	Vertical jump	Broad jump	Bench press
6 ft 2 1/4 in (1.89 m)	225 lb (102 kg)	4.41 s	1.50 s	2.53 s	4.20 s	6.73 s	40 in (1.02 m)	9 ft 11 in (3.02 m)	19 reps
Shuttle and cone drill from Pro Day, all other values from NFL Combine.

=== San Diego Chargers ===
With Naanee playing most of his football career at receiver, the Chargers selected Naanee with the 172nd overall selection in the fifth round of the 2007 NFL draft.

Naanee was targeted by Norv Turner to become the next star for the Chargers to become his F-Back project, much like Delanie Walker and Michael Robinson were when Turner was the offensive coordinator of the San Francisco 49ers. The F-Back is much like the H-back in other offenses in the sense it is a hybrid position (WR/TE/FB) purposely versatile to take advantage of mismatches.

Naanee was the starting number two receiver for the Chargers behind Malcom Floyd for much of the 2010 season. This is due to a holdout by the usual starter Vincent Jackson. Naanee caught a touchdown pass in his first start of the 2010 season on a 59-yard pass from quarterback Philip Rivers in the season opener against the Kansas City Chiefs.

Regarding his versatility, head coach Norv Turner said, "We're going to continue to move him. He's going to be a guy who's versatile enough to move around. That's going to help him be put in position to make some plays." On December 6, 2009, Naanee completed a pass on a flea flicker to LaDainian Tomlinson.

==== Arrest ====
He was arrested for public intoxication and resisting arrest at the scene of a homicide in Indianapolis on February 12, 2011.

=== Carolina Panthers ===
Naanee signed with the Carolina Panthers on August 4, 2011. He played the whole season as the number 3 receiver behind Steve Smith and Brandon LaFell. He caught 1 touchdown pass from Quarterback Cam Newton. At the end of the season the Panthers did not renew his contract.

=== Miami Dolphins ===
Naanee signed a one-year deal with the Miami Dolphins on April 17. He was cut on October 2, 2012 after posting only one catch for 19 yards in his four-game tenure with the team.

== Career statistics ==
Year	Team	GP	GS	Receiving					Rushing					Fumbles	
Year	Team	GP	GS	Rec	Yds	Avg	Lng	TD	Att	Yds	Avg	Lng	TD	Fum	Lost
2007	SD	13	0	8	69	8.6	22	0	--	--	--	--	--	--	--
2008	SD	16	0	8	64	8.0	18	0	--	--	--	--	--	--	-
2009	SD	15	1	24	242	10.1	23	2	3	7	2.3	10	0	--	--
2010	SD	10	9	23	271	16.1	59	1	3	-2	-0.7	6	0	1	1
2011	CAR	15	10	44	467	10.6	28	1	--	--	--	--	--	--	--
2012	MIA	4	1	1	19	19.0	19	0							
Total		69	20	108	1,232	11.3	59	4	6	5	0.8	10	0	1	1
