= Ryan Otterson =

American football player (born 1986)

No. 67
- Position: Offensive tackle

Personal information
- Born: November 29, 1986 (age 39); Albert Lea, Minnesota
- Listed height: 6 ft 5 in (1.96 m)
- Listed weight: 291 lb (132 kg)

Career information
- College: Wyoming
- NFL draft: 2010: undrafted

Career history
- San Diego Chargers (2010–2011)*
- * Offseason or practice squad member only
- Stats at Pro Football Reference

Ryan Otterson (born November 29, 1986, in Albert Lea, Minnesota) is an American former football offensive tackle. He attended Wyoming University, as a member of the 2010 graduating class. Shortly after the draft ended, Otterson joined the San Diego Chargers as an undrafted free agent.

== College career ==
Otterson redshirted in his freshman year at the University of Wyoming. He served as a backup left tackle in 2006. He took over as the starting left tackle as redshirted sophomore in 2007. He would go on to start every game of his sophomore, junior and senior years at Wyoming.

== Professional career ==
After going undrafted in the 2010 NFL draft, Otterson signed with the San Diego Chargers as a rookie free agent on May 10, 2010, he was later cut and signed to the practice squad before the regular season. He was waived again in 2011 after re-signing with San Diego, on August 30.

== Personal life ==
Otterson currently works as a World History teacher at Timnath Middle High School in Timnath, Colorado. He also coaches the Timnath High School Football team as the Offensive Line Coach.
