= Nick Richmond =

American football player (born 1987)

Profile
- Position: Offensive tackle

Personal information
- Born: May 1, 1987 (age 39); Garland, Texas, U.S.
- Listed height: 6 ft 8 in (2.03 m)
- Listed weight: 309 lb (140 kg)

Career information
- College: TCU
- NFL draft: 2010: undrafted

Career history
- San Diego Chargers (2010–2011)*
- * Offseason or practice squad member only
- Stats at Pro Football Reference

Nick Richmond (born May 1, 1987) is an American former professional football offensive tackle. He attended Texas Christian, as a member of the 2010 graduating class. Shortly after the draft ended, Richmond joined the San Diego Chargers as an undrafted free agent.
