= Malcolm Floyd =

American football player (born 1972)

No. 83, 82
- Position: Wide receiver

Personal information
- Born: December 19, 1972 (age 53); San Francisco, California, U.S.
- Listed height: 6 ft 0 in (1.83 m)
- Listed weight: 194 lb (88 kg)

Career information
- High school: Sacramento (CA) McClatchy
- College: Fresno State
- NFL draft: 1994: 3rd round, 101st overall pick

Career history
- Houston/Tennessee Oilers (1994–1997); St. Louis Rams (1997); New Orleans Saints (1999)*
- * Offseason or practice squad member only

Career NFL statistics
- Receptions: 26
- Receiving yards: 351
- Receiving touchdowns: 2
- Stats at Pro Football Reference

Malcolm Gregory Ali Floyd (né Seabron; born December 19, 1972) is an American former professional football player who was a wide receiver in the National Football League (NFL) for the Houston/Tennessee Oilers (1994–1997) and St. Louis Rams (1997). He was selected by the Oilers in the third round of the 1994 NFL draft with the 101st overall pick.

From 2011 to 2013, Floyd had been the varsity football coach and had taught mathematics at C. K. McClatchy High School in Sacramento, California.

Floyd's younger brother, Malcom, was also a wide receiver in the NFL. Floyd was allowed to name his younger sibling, and he named him after himself—their father introduced the spelling difference.

== See also ==
- List of family relations in American football
