= Malcom Floyd =

American football player (born 1981)

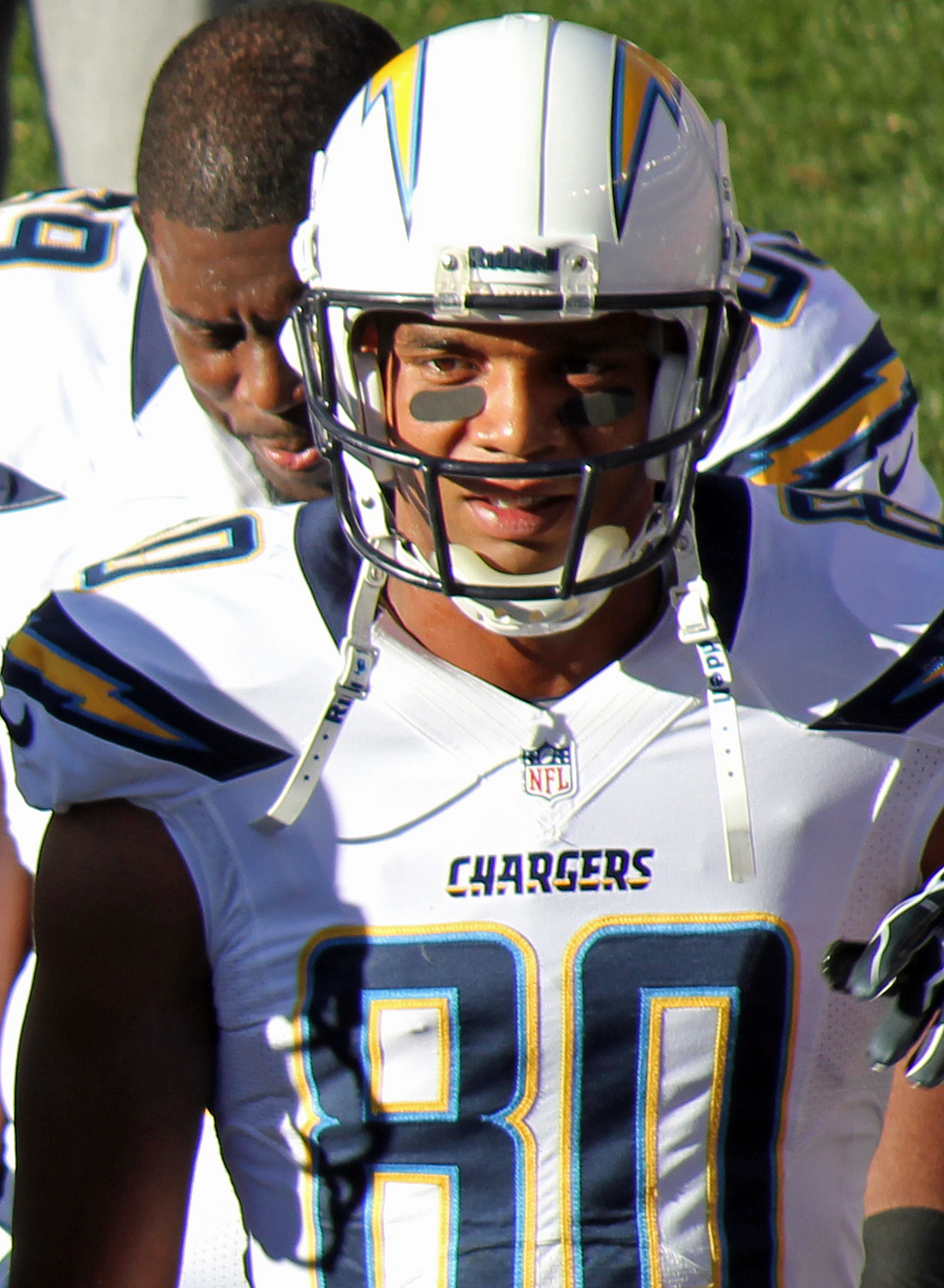
- Floyd with the San Diego Chargers in 2012

No. 13, 80
- Position: Wide receiver

Personal information
- Born: September 8, 1981 (age 45); Sacramento, California, U.S.
- Listed height: 6 ft 5 in (1.96 m)
- Listed weight: 225 lb (102 kg)

Career information
- High school: River City (West Sacramento, California)
- College: Wyoming (1999–2003)
- NFL draft: 2004: undrafted

Career history
- San Diego Chargers (2004–2015)

Career NFL statistics
- Receptions: 321
- Receiving yards: 5,550
- Receiving touchdowns: 34
- Stats at Pro Football Reference

Malcom Maiuu Floyd (born September 8, 1981) is an American former professional football player who was a wide receiver for the San Diego Chargers in the National Football League (NFL). He played his entire NFL career with San Diego after signing with them as an undrafted free agent in 2004. He played college football for the Wyoming Cowboys.

== Early life ==
Born Malcom Floyd Maiuu Seabron in Sacramento, California, Floyd played at River City High School in West Sacramento, California, where he was an All-Metro and Offensive MVP of the league. He was also a First-team all-league selection in basketball.

== College career ==
Floyd attended the University of Wyoming (1999–2004). While there, he majored in health sciences. As a freshman with the Cowboys, he redshirted in 1999. Floyd was a First-team all-conference selection by Football News and Sporting News as a sophomore. Floyd finished his career with 186 catches for 2,411 yards and 14 touchdowns. He was an Honorable mention All-Mountain West Conference as senior.

== Professional career ==
As an NFL prospect in 2004, Floyd was not invited to the NFL Scouting Combine. He was signed by the San Diego Chargers as an undrafted free agent after the 2004 NFL draft.

In 2004, Floyd was signed by the San Diego Chargers as an undrafted rookie soon after the draft on April 30. He was waived on September 5 and signed to the practice squad two days later, and then re-signed to the active roster on December 11.

Floyd started against the Kansas City Chiefs on January 2, 2005, and caught his first NFL touchdown, a 13-yard pass from Philip Rivers which also happened to be Rivers’s own first career touchdown. Floyd helped set up a second-quarter touchdown catch by Ryan Krause with a 27-yard catch down to Chiefs’ 10-yard line, leading to a touchdown three plays later. Floyd played as a back-up in the Wild Card playoff game against the New York Jets.

In 2005, Floyd was released on September 3 and re-signed to the practice squad two days later. He spent the first 12 weeks of the season on the Chargers’ practice squad. He was then signed to the main roster on December 7 but remained inactive for the rest of the season.

In 2006, Floyd caught a 31-yard touchdown pass against the Baltimore Ravens, on a play in which Samari Rolle slipped and fell in coverage. He caught a touchdown pass for the second time in two weeks with a nine-yard tip-toe catch in the back corner of the end zone against Pittsburgh. Floyd caught a career-long 46-yard touchdown pass in the third quarter of the win against the Cincinnati Bengals. He was selected as the Chargers Alumni Player of the Week following the game in Cincinnati, after substituting for Eric Parker who was out with a neck injury. Floyd left Cincinnati with his first career 100-yard game, making five catches for 109 yards and a touchdown. He was inactive for Week 13 game against the Denver Broncos with an ankle injury. Floyd was placed on injured reserve due to the ankle injury on December 14.

In 2007, Floyd made a 25-yard catch on a 3rd-and-13 play during the opening drive of the second half against Green Bay Packers that helped set up 21-yard touchdown catch-and-run by LaDainian Tomlinson. He helped extend the Chargers' touchdown drive on the opening series of the Week 6 game against the Oakland Raiders with a 16-yard catch on 3rd down.

In 2008, Floyd was re-signed by the Chargers as a restricted free agent. He went on to play in 13 games with three starts. He ended the season with 27 receptions good for 465 yards and four touchdowns.

In 2009, following the release of Chris Chambers, Floyd became the Chargers' number two starting receiver. Floyd played in 16 games, with 45 receptions for 776 yards, a 17.2 YPR, and one touchdown.

In 2010, Floyd signed a one-year RFA tender contract on June 7. He played 11 games with 37 receptions for 717 yards, despite missing five games with a groin injury. Floyd averaged 19.4 yards per catch as he emerged as an elite downfield threat.

After the end of the 2011 NFL Lockout, Floyd was courted by the Ravens before re-signing for two years with the San Diego Chargers on August 5.

Again playing in limited games due to injury, Floyd missed 4 games, but still put up a career-high 856 receiving yards. For the second straight year he averaged over 19 yards per catch, this year averaging 19.9. Floyd's average was also the ninth highest average in team history among players with at least 40 catches.

Floyd also performed a rather impressive feat in 2011 when 41 of his 43 catches went for first downs. The 95.3 percent clip was the second-highest in NFL history (min. 32 catches). Only Henry Ellard, who totaled 71 first downs on 74 catches (95.9%) for the Washington Redskins in 1994, posted a higher percentage.

In 2012, Floyd was on his way to a 1,000-yard season when his campaign was cut short by two games as result of an ankle injury. He still managed to lead the team with a career-high 56 catches and score five touchdowns.

In 2013, Floyd was carted off the practice field on August 12 with a potentially serious right knee injury. An MRI brought good news as Floyd avoided a ligament tear.

On September 15, 2013, during a Week 2 game against the Philadelphia Eagles, Floyd was again carted off the field after an undisclosed head injury. He had feeling in all limbs and was awake and alert in the hospital, and it was announced he would fly to back to San Diego with his team, not needing to stay overnight at the hospital. He was placed on injured reserve on October 1, 2013, as a result of this neck injury.

In 2014, Floyd returned from his injury to play against the Arizona Cardinals in Week 1. He caught 4 passes for 50 yards including a six-yard touchdown reception. After missing the final 14 games the prior season, Floyd played in all 16 games for just the second time in his career. He had 52 catches and six touchdowns; his receiving yards (856) tied his career high and also led the team for the second time in three years. He and teammate Jarret Johnson were named by the Chargers as their most inspirational players.

On June 9, 2015, the San Diego Chargers announced that Floyd would retire after the 2015 season.

== NFL career statistics ==
Legend
	Led the league
**Bold**	Career high

Year	Team	GP	Receiving							Fumbles	
Year	Team	GP	Rec	Tgt	Yds	Avg	Lng	TD	FD	Fum	Lost
2004	SD	4	3	9	49	16.3	27	1	2	0	0
2005	SD	0	DNP								
2006	SD	12	15	32	210	14.0	46	3	9	0	0
2007	SD	6	7	13	97	13.9	25	0	4	0	0
2008	SD	13	27	37	465	17.2	49	4	21	0	0
2009	SD	**16**	45	76	776	17.2	53	1	36	0	0
2010	SD	11	37	77	717	19.4	55	**6**	33	**1**	0
2011	SD	12	43	70	**856**	19.9	52	5	41	0	0
2012	SD	14	**56**	84	814	14.5	39	5	**47**	0	0
2013	SD	2	6	11	149	**24.8**	47	0	5	0	0
2014	SD	**16**	52	**92**	**856**	16.5	59	**6**	39	0	0
2015	SD	15	30	69	561	18.7	**70**	3	19	**1**	**1**
Career		121	321	570	5,550	17.3	70	34	256	2	1

== Personal life ==
Floyd's older brother, Malcolm, played wide receiver for the Houston Oilers from 1994–1997. The older brother was allowed to name his sibling, and he named him after himself—their father introduced the spelling difference.

Floyd’s mother, Leataata, resided in Sacramento where she volunteered as a mentor, tutor, counselor and ambassador, who taught Polynesian dancing after school each day at one of the poorest schools in the city. In 2012, the Sacramento School District paid tribute to Floyd by changing the name of the school where she had given so much of her time from Jedediah Smith Elementary to Leataata Floyd Elementary.

Floyd and his wife, Daphne, have two sons, Maiu and Malc. In his spare time, Malcom enjoys playing basketball, bodyboarding at Mission Beach and spending time grilling out with his family. An all-conference hoopster in high school, Floyd’s team won the school’s intramural championship while he was an undergrad at Wyoming.

== See also ==
- List of family relations in American football
