= History of the Denver Broncos =

The history of the Denver Broncos American football club began when the team was chartered a member of the American Football League in 1960. The Broncos have played in the city of Denver, Colorado throughout their entire history. The Broncos did not win any titles as members of the AFL. Since the 1970 AFL–NFL merger, the Broncos have won 15 division titles, and played in eight Super Bowls, following the 1977, 1986, 1987, 1989, 1997, 1998, 2013, and 2015 seasons. They won Super Bowl XXXII, Super Bowl XXXIII and Super Bowl 50. Their most famous player is former quarterback John Elway, starting quarterback in five Super Bowls and holder of many NFL records. The Broncos currently play in the National Football League's AFC West division.

For much of their first 3 decades, excluding teams in Texas, they were the only major pro football team between Kansas City and California (and the only team in the Interior West). This distinction ended in 1988, when the Cardinals moved from St. Louis to Phoenix. The Broncos remain the only current AFC West (formerly AFL West) team to never relocate or change its name.

== Origins ==
In the summer of 1959, Bob Howsam, owner of minor league baseball's Denver Bears, the Triple-A affiliate of the New York Yankees, had a problem. He'd expanded the team's home, Bears Stadium, to 23,100 seats after Denver was named a charter member of the Continental League, a proposed third major league. However, the league died when the established major leagues granted expansion franchises to two of its cities (New York and Houston) and moved the Washington Senators to the Twin Cities to head off the CL's overtures in Minnesota, but left the Mile High City and Colorado out of the expansion. Howsam was now saddled with a massive debt load and a stadium far too large for a Triple-A team.

Howsam concluded the only realistic way to service the debt was to extend Bears Stadium's season by bringing football to Denver. To that end, he added just under 12,000 more seats to better accommodate the sport. He first tried to get an expansion NFL franchise to Denver, but he was denied a team by NFL owners under the leadership of Chicago Bears owner George Halas. The snub led Howsam and four others to start up a rival to the NFL. The new league, the American Football League, announced its formation on August 14, 1959, with Howsam's Denver team as a charter member. A 1960 "name-the-team" contest yielded the nickname "Broncos." The first general manager of the new team was Dean Griffing, and the first head coach was Frank Filchock.

== The AFL years ==
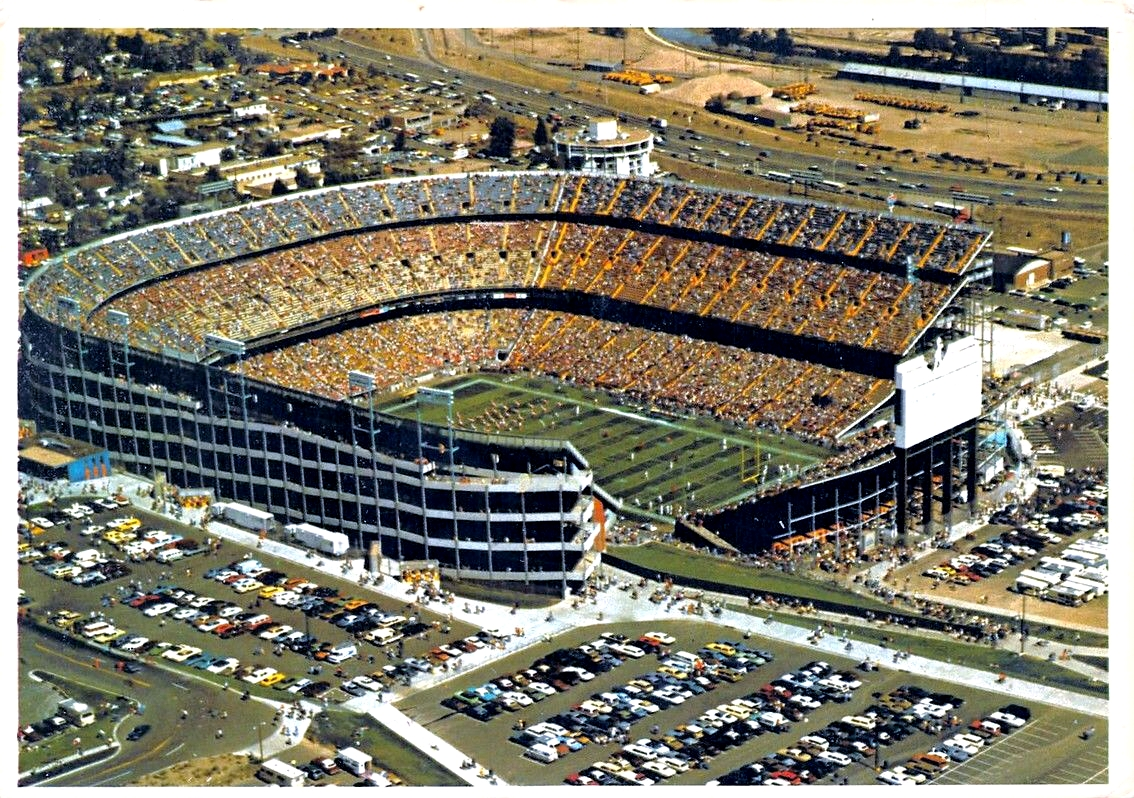
Denver Mile High Stadium was the home of the Broncos from 1960–2000

Denver had the worst record of any original AFL team, with a record of 39–97–4 in the league. They were the only original AFL team never to have played in the title game during the upstart league's 10-year history. Indeed, they were the only team to never have a winning season, never winning more than five games.

Despite their lack of early success, the Broncos produced some memorable games, such as the 38–38 tie against the Buffalo Bills in 1960. They were the first AFL team ever to defeat an NFL team, on August 5, 1967 when they beat the Detroit Lions 13–7 in a preseason game. The Broncos were also the first American professional football team to have an African-American placekicker, Gene Mingo, the first to have a receiver with 100 receptions in a season, Lionel Taylor, and the first starting African-American quarterback of the modern era, Marlin Briscoe.

=== The Filchock era ===
The Broncos began play in 1960, the AFL's inaugural season, at Bears Stadium. Their head coach was Frank Filchock, who choose Frank Tripucka as the Broncos' first starting quarterback. The Broncos won their first game, also the first AFL game, 13–10 over the Boston Patriots. However, the Broncos would end the season with a 4–9–1 record. After the season, Howsam, looking to sell his holdings in the Broncos, nearly made a deal with a San Antonio syndicate, but eventually a group led by Calvin Kunz purchased Howsam's shares. At this point, Gerald Phipps became the Broncos largest stockholder.

=== The Faulkner era ===
Following a 3–11 campaign in 1961, the Broncos replaced Filchock with Jack Faulkner, who ritualistically burned the Broncos vertically-striped socks prior to the new season. Faulkner led them to a 7–7 record in 1962, their best record in the AFL. This .500 season was not, however, a prelude to success, as the Broncos would lose at least 10 games each of the next five years, during which they were led by four coaches and over half a dozen starting quarterbacks.

=== The Speedie/Malavasi era ===
Mac Speedie replaced Faulkner five games into the 1964 season, breaking an eleven-game losing streak by beating Kansas City 37–33. However, the Broncos would only win one more game in 1964, ending the season with a 2–11–1 record. The team improved only marginally in 1965, finishing with a 4–10 record. In the first game of the 1966 season, a 45–7 loss to Houston, the Broncos failed to record a first down and finished with only 26 yards of total offense, including −7 yards passing. After the 2nd game, Speedie resigned and was replaced by interim head coach Ray Malavasi, under whom the Broncos finished the season 4–10.

Denver came close to losing the Broncos in 1965, when a group of minority partners joined together with the intent to sell the team to interests based in Atlanta. However, a different pair of owners, Alan and Gerald Phipps, bought the team (along with Bears Stadium) and kept them in Denver (with Atlanta then claimed by the NFL for the expansion Falcons). In the aftermath of the near loss of what was Denver's only professional sports team at the time, season ticket sales nearly tripled the following year.

=== The Saban era begins ===
In 1967, the Broncos hired Lou Saban, coach of the two-time defending AFL champion Buffalo Bills, as head coach. Saban's first order of business was to generate interest in the team to keep them in Denver. The NFL and AFL had agreed to merge a year earlier, and the Broncos needed to expand Bears Stadium to 50,000 in order to meet the merged league's capacity requirements. This required raising funds from businesses and the people of Denver. If unsuccessful, the team would target Birmingham, Alabama for a move, or even try to be a second Chicago team.

Saban decided to use his #1 pick for an impact player. With the 6th pick, he chose Syracuse All-America Floyd Little, the first 3-time All-America since Doak Walker. With the Broncos' past #1 picks, such as Dick Butkus and Merlin Olsen, choosing the other side in the AFL-NFL bidding wars, Little became the first #1 pick to sign with the team. His signing created a landslide of enthusiasm for the Broncos. Little and other Broncos went door-to-door to solicit funds for the stadium, and he even rode buses to Wyoming, Nebraska and other nearby states to bring in money. In doing so, Little became known as "The Franchise" for his tireless efforts to keep the team in Denver.

Little proved to be every ounce as valuable on the field for the Broncos as well. Saban kept 26 rookies his first season including Little, along with numerous 2nd and 3rd year players. Little was the only bright spot in a dismal 3–11 season. He led the AFL and NFL in punt returns with a blistering 17-yard average. He also led the league in combined yards (rushing, receiving and returns). In 1968, he led the league again in combined yards and became the only player in either league to return a punt for a touchdown in both seasons. That same year, the city of Denver bought Bears Stadium from the Broncos, renamed it Mile High Stadium, and leased it back to the Broncos and Bears. The purchase made it possible to finish the required expansion.

In 1969, Little was clearly the best back in the AFL or NFL. After just six games, he was more than 300 yards ahead of all running backs, piling up 700 yards when he tore up his knee and missed most of the season. He was named All-AFL for his efforts. In 1970, despite playing with a broken bone in his back and having a record 5 starting quarterbacks, Little led the AFC in rushing.

In 1971, Little did it again. He not only led the AFC in rushing, but also out-rushed any NFL player with 1,133 yards. However, even with Little's superb prowess and the likes of defensive end Rich Jackson creating havoc on defense, Saban could not bring the Broncos success. He finished in fourth place in the division in all 5 years of his tenure.

== The 1970s ==
=== The Saban/Smith/Ralston era ===
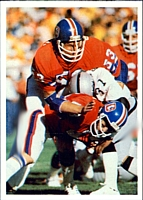
The Broncos defeated the Raiders in the 1977–78 AFC Championship Game to earn their first trip to the Super Bowl.

In 1970, the Broncos began a home sellout streak (not including games using replacement players) which has lasted to the present. During their first season as part of the NFL, the Broncos finished 5–8–1 and 4–9–1 in 1971. The team then went 5–9 in 1972, but continued to sell games out. In 1973, John Ralston coached the now-mature Broncos to a 7–5–2 record, the franchise's first winning season, including a dramatic tie with Oakland in Denver's first-ever Monday Night Football appearance that is still remembered as a pivotal game in Broncos history. During the game, announcer Don Meredith famously told the audience: "Welcome to the Mile High City and I really am!" The second game of the 1974 season was a 35–35 tie with the Steelers, the first to take place under the NFL's new overtime rules. The year ended at 7–6–1, for another winning record. In 1975, the Broncos dropped to 6–8, the final season for running back Floyd Little. Otis Armstrong took his place, and despite finishing 9–5 in 1976, the playoffs still eluded them.

=== Broncomania and the first Super Bowl appearance ===
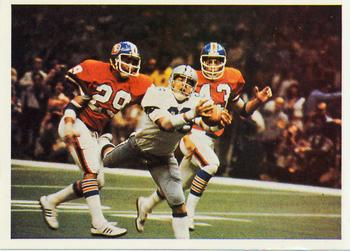
The Broncos could not overcome the Cowboys in their inaugural Super Bowl appearance.

Rookie coach Red Miller, along with the Orange Crush Defense (a nickname popularized in 1977) and aging quarterback Craig Morton, led the Broncos to a miracle season in 1977. The team won the division with a 12–2 record, beating an injury-plagued Steelers team 34–21. In the conference championship, they faced their division rival and defending Super Bowl champion Raiders, winning a close game 20–17 and sending them to Super Bowl XII. Facing the Cowboys in the New Orleans Superdome, the Broncos played sloppily the entire game, turning the ball over eight times. They were crushed 27–10 by the Cowboys. Despite the disappointing loss to Dallas, their season catapulted the franchise out of the basement and they since have enjoyed four decades of consistency that few teams have matched. The successful season also brought the phenomena of "Broncomania" to a fever pitch, with the team the talk of the town, selling 65,000 Super Bowl T-shirts in 48 hours. Earlier that year, superfan Tim McKernan, better known as the Barrel Man, began wearing only an orange-colored aluminum barrel, boots and a cowboy hat to games, a ritual he repeated for 30 years. The 1978 season saw the Broncos finish 10–6 (the season having been extended to 16 games) and win the division again, but they were routed out of the playoffs by the Steelers 33–10. Another 10–6 season and a playoff appearance followed in 1979, but three division losses reduced the Broncos to a wild card team. They lost to the Oilers 13–7 in the Astrodome.

== The early 1980s/The John Elway years ==
=== 1980–1982 ===
The Broncos lost a step to begin the 1980s, finishing with a middling 8–8 record in 1980. Dan Reeves was named the new Bronco head coach in 1981. That same year, American/Canadian financier Edgar Kaiser, Jr. purchased the Broncos from the Gerald Phipps family. The team did post a two-game improvement, but after winning their first five out of six games to start the season, the team went 5-5 the rest of the way, and their 10–6 mark was not enough for a playoff berth. The 1982 season would be shortened due to a player's strike, and the Broncos struggled mightily, finishing with their worst season record in team history, and first losing season since 1975 with a 2–7 mark. However, the following season would mark a turnaround for the team.

=== 1983–1999 ===
The Bowlen family, including Pat and his two brothers John Bowlen and Bill Bowlen, and sister Marybeth Bowlen, purchased the team from Kaiser in 1984. Quarterback John Elway arrived in 1983. Originally drafted by the Baltimore Colts as the first pick of the draft, Elway proclaimed that he would shun football in favor of baseball (he was drafted by the New York Yankees to play center field) unless he was traded to one of a selected list of other teams, which included Denver. During the 23 seasons prior to Elway's arrival, Denver used over 24 starting quarterbacks.

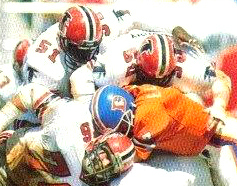
Elway (center) getting tackled by the Atlanta Falcons in 1985.

Under Elway and head coach Dan Reeves (hired in 1981), the Broncos became one of the most dominant AFC teams of the 1980s, winning 3 AFC championships (1986, 1987, 1989), with Elway winning the NFL MVP Award in 1987. The first two Super Bowl appearances were preceded by storied victories over the Cleveland Browns in the AFC Championship game, each acquiring its own nickname: The Drive in 1987, in which the Broncos drove 98 yards to score a late game-tying touchdown, and The Fumble in 1988, in which Brown Earnest Byner lost the ball and a game-tying touchdown late in the game. However, the Broncos lost all three Super Bowls during this period by at least three touchdowns. In fact, Super Bowl XXIV against the San Francisco 49ers was the most lopsided Super Bowl in NFL history.

During the 1980s, the Broncos played in at least two storied Monday Night Football games. On October 15, 1984, the Broncos played a famed game against the Packers during a major blizzard. The following season, on November 11, 1985, the Broncos won a Monday Night Football home game when a fan threw a snowball onto the field during 49ers kicker Ray Wersching's field goal attempt. 49ers holder Matt Cavanaugh picked up the ball and threw it incomplete, losing 3 decisive points in a 17–16 loss. In the late 1980s and early 1990s, Elway's strong receiving corps of Mark Jackson, Vance Johnson and Ricky Nattiel was nicknamed the "Three Amigos" after the popular movie. Early in the 1980s, the Broncos were the first NFL team to play the song "Rock and Roll, Pt. 2" (AKA "the Hey Song"), during games.

Coming off their Super Bowl XXIV appearance, the Denver Broncos began the 1990s on a sour note, finishing in last place in the AFC West with a 5–11 record. It didn't take long for the Broncos to make another turnaround, making a 7-game improvement in the 1991 season, finishing 12-4 and winning another AFC West crown. John Elway made another 4th quarter comeback against the Houston Oilers in the Divisional Playoff round, guiding the Broncos to a 26–24 win. However, their 1991 season came to an end the next week at the hands of the Buffalo Bills in a largely defensive matchup, 10–7.

=== 1990s ===
Reeves was fired following an 8–8 1992 campaign and replaced with Wade Phillips, a move often attributed to Reeves' stormy relationship with Elway. Following campaigns of 9–7 and 7–9 in 1993 and 1994 respectively, Phillips was fired and the Broncos named former Broncos quarterbacks coach Mike Shanahan Head Coach.

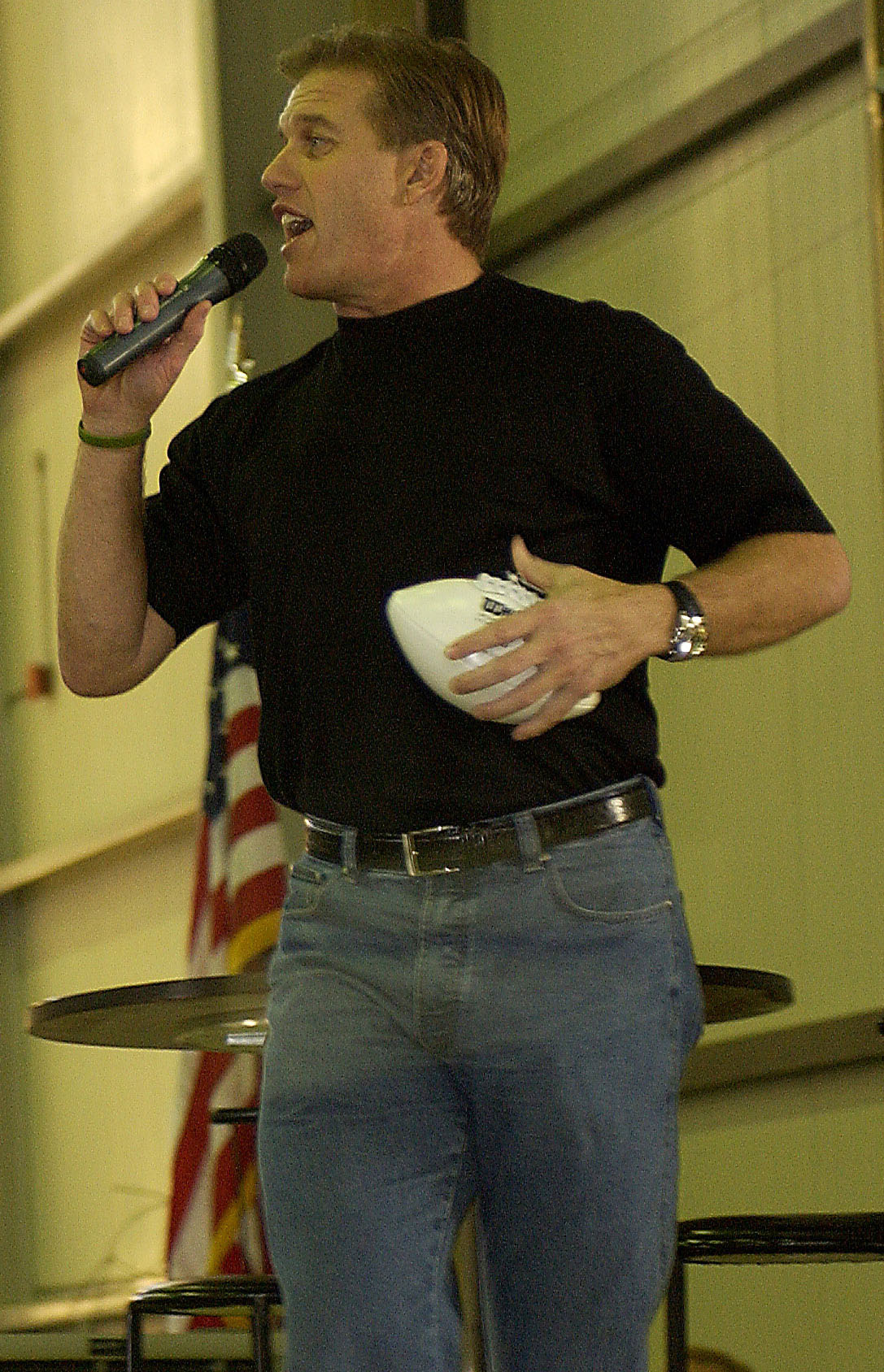
John Elway won two Super Bowls for Denver

In 1995, the Broncos debuted a new Zone blocking schemeunder Mike Shanahan and rookie running back Terrell Davis, who would quickly emerge as an All-Pro running back. The Broncos established a tradition in 1996 where the offensive linemen do not talk with the media as a form of bonding. This was evident during the player introductions for the starting lineup on nationally televised prime time games as the linemen would not introduce themselves. How they were introduced has varied over the years as sometimes, another offensive player introduces them and during other times, the announcers introduce the offensive linemen. Due to a rule change within the NFL in 2007, this tradition came to an end. For the 2007 season each player is required to make themselves available for media interviews. On a Sunday Night Football game against the Steelers, the linemen introduced themselves.

In 1996, Shanahan's second season, the Broncos went 13–3 and appeared on their way to another Super Bowl appearance. However, they were defeated by the Jacksonville Jaguars in a stunning 30–27 divisional round loss. In 1997, the Broncos went 12–4, securing a wild card spot in the playoffs. Following playoff wins over the Jaguars, Chiefs and Steelers, the Broncos faced the heavily favored Packers in Super Bowl XXXII. Davis led the Broncos to their first Super Bowl victory, 31–24. Although Elway completed only 12 of his 22 passes, throwing one interception and no touchdowns, he executed what was perhaps the game's best-known play, known as The Helicopter, when he boldly ran for a crucial first down while surviving strong hits from two safeties as he jumped through the air like a propeller. Terrell Davis was able to overcome a severe migraine headache that caused him blurred vision and rush for 157 yards and three touchdowns to earn Super Bowl MVP honors.

The following season, the Broncos began the year by winning their first 13 games. The first loss of the season came at the hands of the Giants, as Kent Graham hit Amani Toomer late in the fourth quarter to steal a 20–16 victory. The loss took the wind from the sails of what would have been a highly anticipated Monday Night Football matchup on the road against the Miami Dolphins for two primary reasons. First, the Broncos would have had a chance at reaching perfection against the only franchise to achieve such a goal. Second, Elway would have gone head-to-head against Dan Marino for only the second time, an oddity of scheduling since both quarterbacks were drafted the same year and both played in the same conference. Elway would play his worst game of the season in a 31–21 loss, and the Broncos would finish the season 14–2. Adding levity to an intense quest for a perfect season, one week normally gregarious tight end Shannon Sharpe refused to speak to the media, leading Shanahan to add to the injury report: "TE Shannon Sharpe (laryngitis) probable." Terrell Davis became the fourth back to rush for 2,000 yards (he would finish with 2,008) during the regular season and won the NFL MVP award. In the playoffs, the Broncos defeated the Dolphins and Jets in the AFC Championship Game to advance to Super Bowl XXXIII. Following the win against the Jets, Elway took one final lap around the field in what would be his final game at Mile High Stadium. Two weeks later in the Super Bowl, Denver defeated the Falcons, led by former coach Dan Reeves, 34–19 to win Super Bowl XXXIII and defend their title. Elway, playing in his final NFL game, won the Super Bowl MVP award.

== The post-John Elway years ==
Since Elway's retirement following the 1998 season, until 2016, Denver had only three losing seasons (1999, 2007 and 2010 and has made the playoffs as a wild card three times (in 2000, 2003 and 2004), and as a division champion six times (2005, 2011, 2012, 2013, 2014, 2015). The Broncos only won 3 playoff games from 1999 to 2012. Since 2012 and the signing of free agent Peyton Manning, they have won five playoff games, including the 2013 and 2015 AFC Championship Games and Super Bowl 50. However, Super Bowl 50 remains their last playoff game as of the end of the 2022 season.

Edgar Kaiser, Jr. sued Pat Bowlen, claiming that the 1984 sale of his shares in the team included an agreement which he contended granted him right of first purchase of any sale of shares in the team. Kaiser claimed Bowlen violated this agreement by offering Elway a 10% stake of the company that holds ownership of the team. In 2004, a jury ruled in favor of Kaiser and a Federal judge decreed that Kaiser was entitled to purchase back 10% of the Broncos using the identical purchase terms offered to Elway. Bowlen appealed and won, as an appellate court ruled that the structure of the Bowlen-Elway deal did not violate the original agreement. It was not the only financial controversy the team faced during the time, as a multi-year investigation revealed they had been giving additional money outside of the team’s salary cap to Elway and Davis during the 1996 season and their first two Super Bowl-winning seasons. Denver claimed they didn’t think it gave them a competitive advantage, but they were stripped of two third-round picks and fined nearly two million dollars.

Original owner Bob Howsam, who went on to more fame as the highly successful general manager and club president of the Cincinnati Reds and the "Big Red Machine" dynasty of the 1970s, died in 2008, and his Broncos successor Gerald Phipps died in 1993. Kaiser died in 2012.

=== The Griese era ===
Brian Griese, son of former Miami Dolphins quarterback Bob Griese, took over as quarterback upon Elway's retirement. Griese led the team from 1999–2002, compiling a record of 34–30. Though the team made the playoffs in the 2000 season under Griese, he never took a snap in the postseason for the Broncos. A shoulder injury he suffered during a gutty Monday Night performance against the arch-rival Raiders (in what would be, ironically, the final Monday Night affair at Mile High Stadium), shelved him for most of the remainder of the season. Thus, Gus Frerotte started the playoff game against the Baltimore Ravens, a 21–3 defeat. The Broncos would finish with winning records under Griese but miss the playoffs in 2001 and 2002.

=== The Plummer era ===
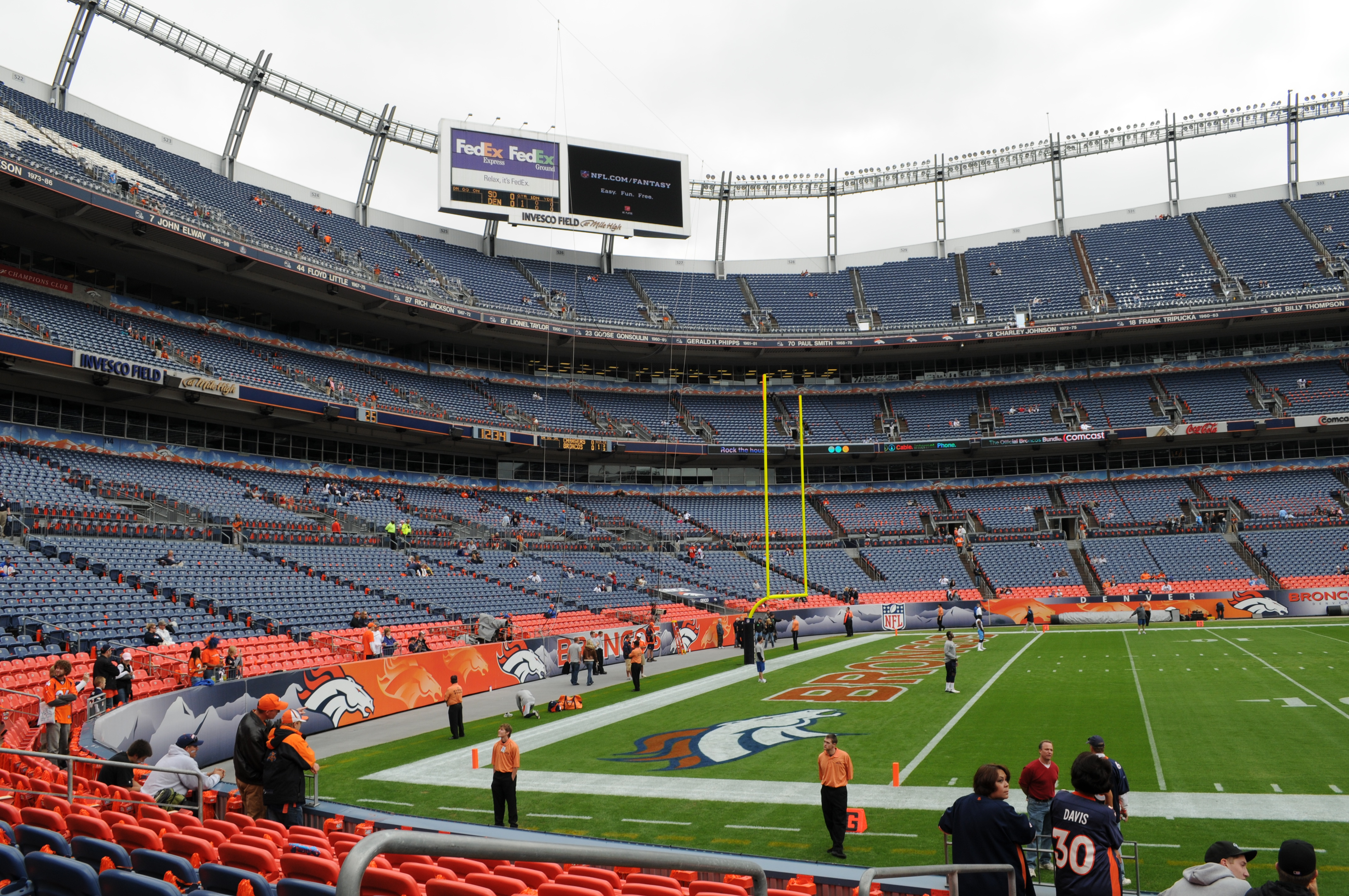
INVESCO Field at Mile High set up for a Broncos game in 2008

Former Arizona Cardinals quarterback Jake Plummer replaced Griese as quarterback prior to the 2003 season. He would lead the team to a 49–26 record and a 1–3 playoff record from 2003 to 2006. Prior to the 2005 season, the Broncos were plagued by early season success followed by late season flops. In both 2003 and 2004 they started the season 5–1 and ended 10–6.

After losing the 2005 season opener, the Broncos won five straight games, defeating the Chargers 20–17, Chiefs 30–10, Jaguars 20–7, Redskins 21–19, and the two-time defending champion Patriots 28–20, on October 16. Denver lost the next game to the Giants on October 23 by a final score of 24–23, in the game's final minute. The following week, the Broncos routed the defending NFC champion Eagles, 49–21, on October 30. In that game, the Broncos became the first team in NFL history to have two players, Mike Anderson and Tatum Bell, rush for over 100 yards and another player, Jake Plummer, pass for over 300 yards in a single game. Denver then defeated the Raiders on November 13, 31–17. The next game, the Broncos shut out the Jets 27–0 in Denver on November 20. It was the Broncos' first shutout win since 1997 (when the team blanked the Panthers that season). Denver then went on to defeat the Cowboys on Thanksgiving Day, November 24, winning in overtime, 24–21, on a Jason Elam 24-yard game-winning field goal. One of the key plays prior to the field goal was a 55-yard run by Ron Dayne, who filled in for the injured Tatum Bell. Denver lost to the Chiefs in the next game, 31–27, on December 4, but won against the Ravens the following week, 12–10. On December 17, the Broncos defeated the Bills, 28–17. On Christmas Eve 2005, the Broncos clinched the AFC West division title, as they finished with a record 8–0 at INVESCO Field at Mile High by defeating the Raiders, 22–3. On December 31, 2005, the Broncos got season-win #13 in a season-sweeping on the road against their division rivals, the Chargers, with a final score of 23–7.

The Broncos entered the playoffs for the third consecutive year with the momentum of a four-game winning streak. Denver finished the regular season with a record of 13–3, tying them with the Seattle Seahawks for second best overall record in the league, behind the 14–2 Indianapolis Colts. Denver was seeded number two in the AFC behind the Colts. On January 14, 2006, the Broncos defeated the two-time defending champion New England Patriots, 27–13, in the divisional round – denying the Patriots from becoming the first NFL team ever to win three consecutive Super Bowl championships. The last team with an opportunity of winning three consecutive Super Bowls before the Patriots were the Broncos themselves. The Broncos' playoff run came to an end after losing to the Pittsburgh Steelers in the AFC Championship, 34–17, on January 22, 2006. Denver turned the ball over four times and were outscored in the first half, 24–3. The Steelers went on to win Super Bowl XL.

=== The Cutler era ===
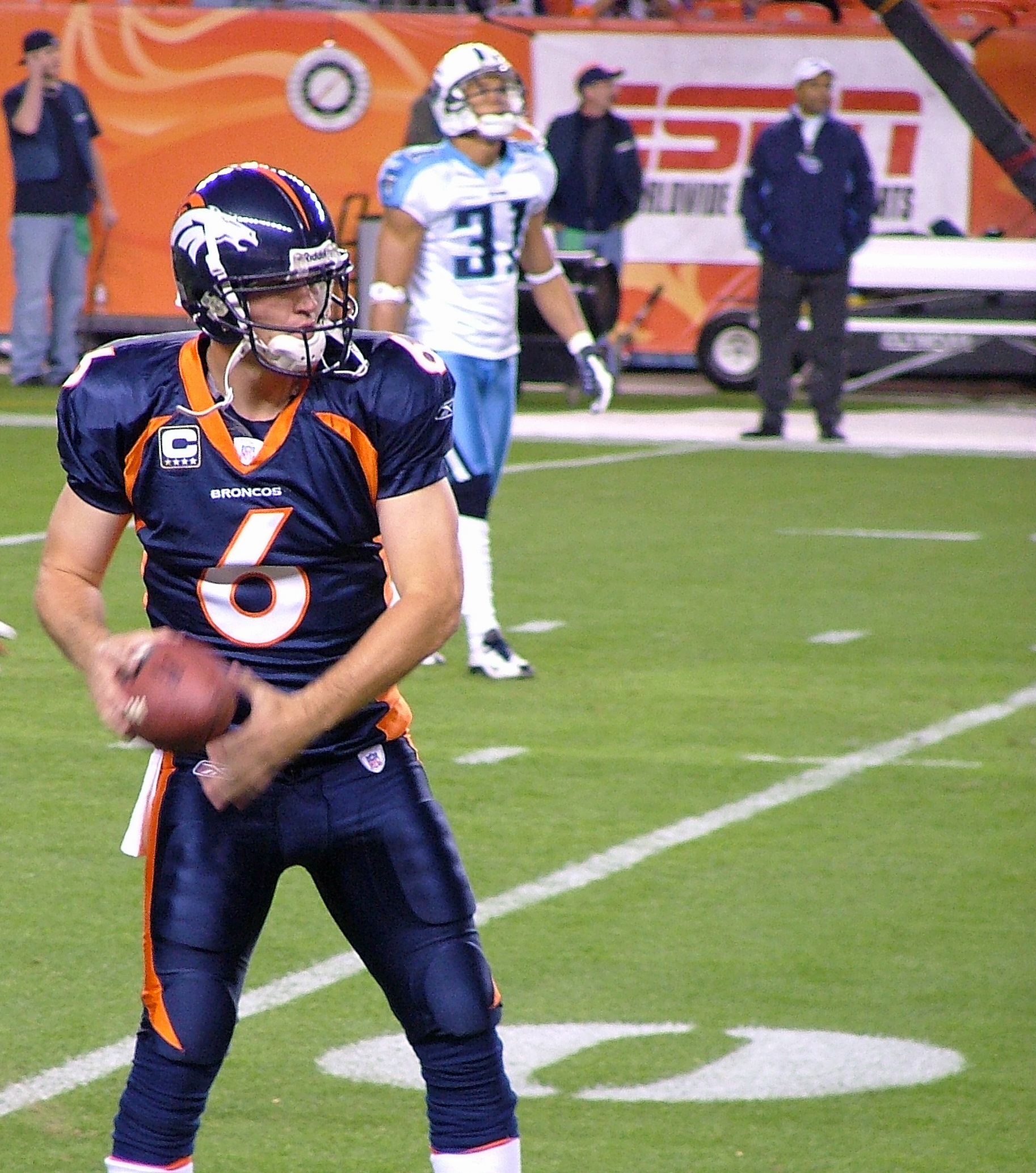
Jay Cutler

The Broncos surprisingly drafted a quarterback, Jay Cutler, following the season in which Plummer nearly led them to the Super Bowl. Plummer's erratic 2006 performance led to his benching in favor of Cutler 12 games into the season. Cutler would go on to lead the Broncos to a 2–3 record in the team's last five games. The Broncos finished the 2006 season tied for the last Wild Card spot with the Chiefs, with a 9–7 record, but lost the tiebreaker due to the Chiefs owning the better AFC West record (4–2 to the Broncos 3–3).

The 2006 season marked longtime wide receiver Rod Smith's last season as a Bronco after 13 seasons. A hip injury that required two hip replacement surgeries effectively ended Smith's career prior to the 2007 season, and Smith officially retired in July 2008.

2007 marked Jay Cutler's first full season as the Broncos' starting quarterback. However, the team suffered through several injuries to key players, including Rod Smith, Tom Nalen, Ben Hamilton, Javon Walker, Jarvis Moss and Ebenezer Ekuban, and finished the season with a 7–9 record, the team's first losing season since 1999. Perhaps the most notable event was a Monday Night Football home loss to the Green Bay Packers, in which the team set a franchise record for tickets distributed for the game, with 77,160 tickets (76,645 fans attended the game). 2007 also marked longtime placekicker Jason Elam's last season in a Broncos uniform after 15 seasons. Elam played with the Atlanta Falcons from 2008–2009, before retiring as a Bronco in March 2010.

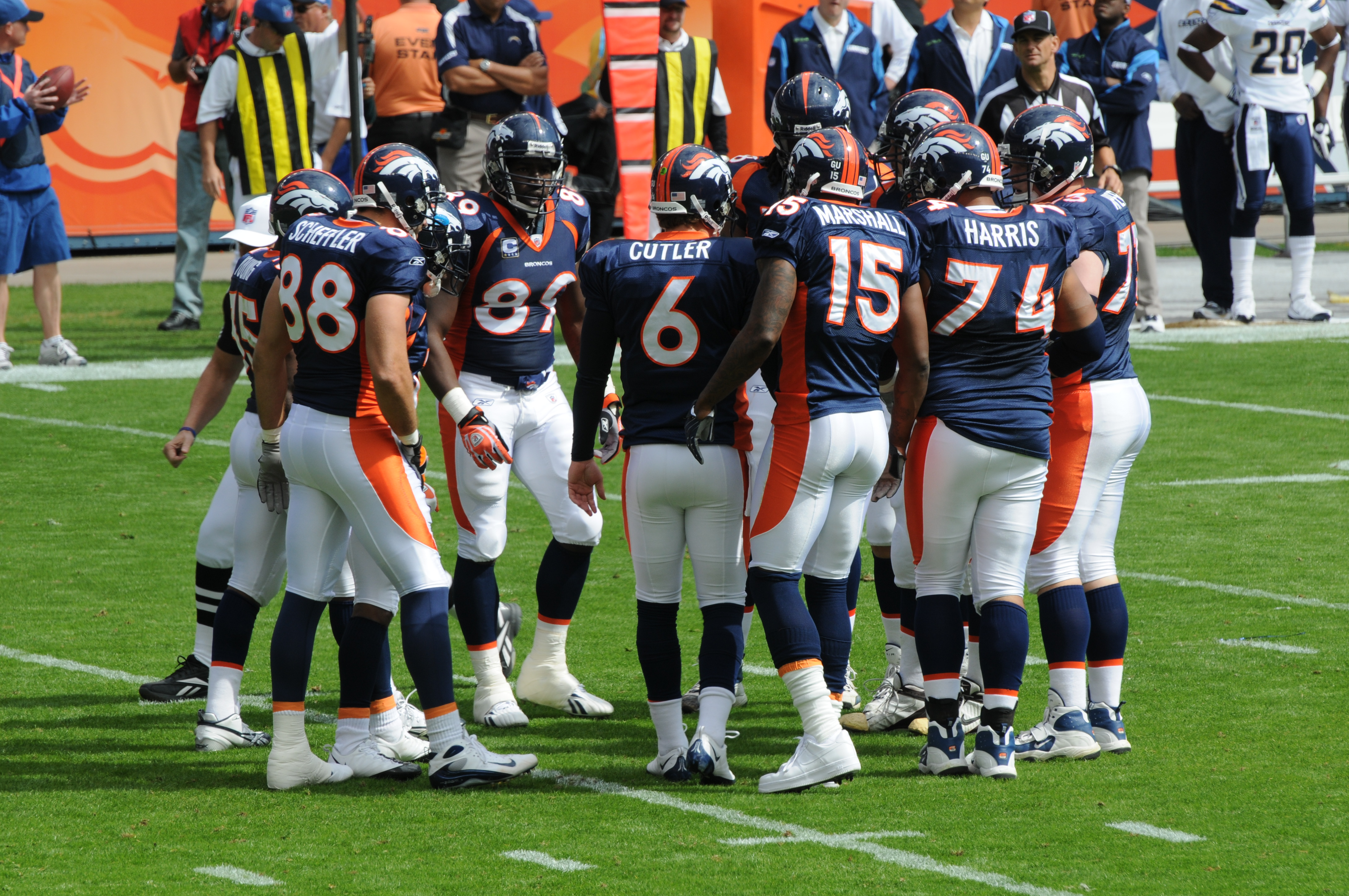
2008 Denver Broncos offense including Selvin Young, Jay Cutler and Brandon Marshall

In 2008, Cutler passed for 4,526 yards, breaking Plummer's Broncos record for passing yardage in a single season. However, 2008 was the third consecutive year the Broncos failed to make the playoffs, this time in spite of holding a three-game lead over the Chargers with three games left to play.

In 2008, the Broncos got off to a 4–1 start, which included a controversial home win against division rival San Diego Chargers, but struggled through a mediocre stretch in the middle of the season. After 13 games, the team was sitting in first place in the AFC West, with an 8–5 record, three games ahead of the Chargers, who were 5–8. However, in the next two weeks, the Broncos suffered back-to-back losses to the Panthers and Bills, while the Chargers won two straight. This set the stage for the 2008 season finale, when the Broncos and Chargers met at San Diego's Qualcomm Stadium to decide the AFC West division title. The Broncos were blown out 52–21 by the Chargers, and would become the first team in NFL history to enter the final quarter of a regular season with a three-game lead and squander the division lead. The Broncos and Chargers finished the season tied at 8–8, but the Chargers won the AFC West based on a better division record (5–1 to the Broncos 3–3). The Broncos missed the playoffs for a third consecutive season.

On December 30, 2008, two days after the disastrous season-ending collapse in San Diego, Mike Shanahan, the longest-tenured and winningest head coach in Broncos' franchise history, was fired after 14 seasons.Two weeks later, on January 11, 2009, the Broncos hired former New England Patriots' offensive coordinator Josh McDaniels as the team's new head coach. Three months later, following a turbulent transition from the Mike Shanahan era to Josh McDaniels, the team traded Pro Bowl quarterback Jay Cutler to the Chicago Bears for quarterback Kyle Orton.

=== The Orton era ===
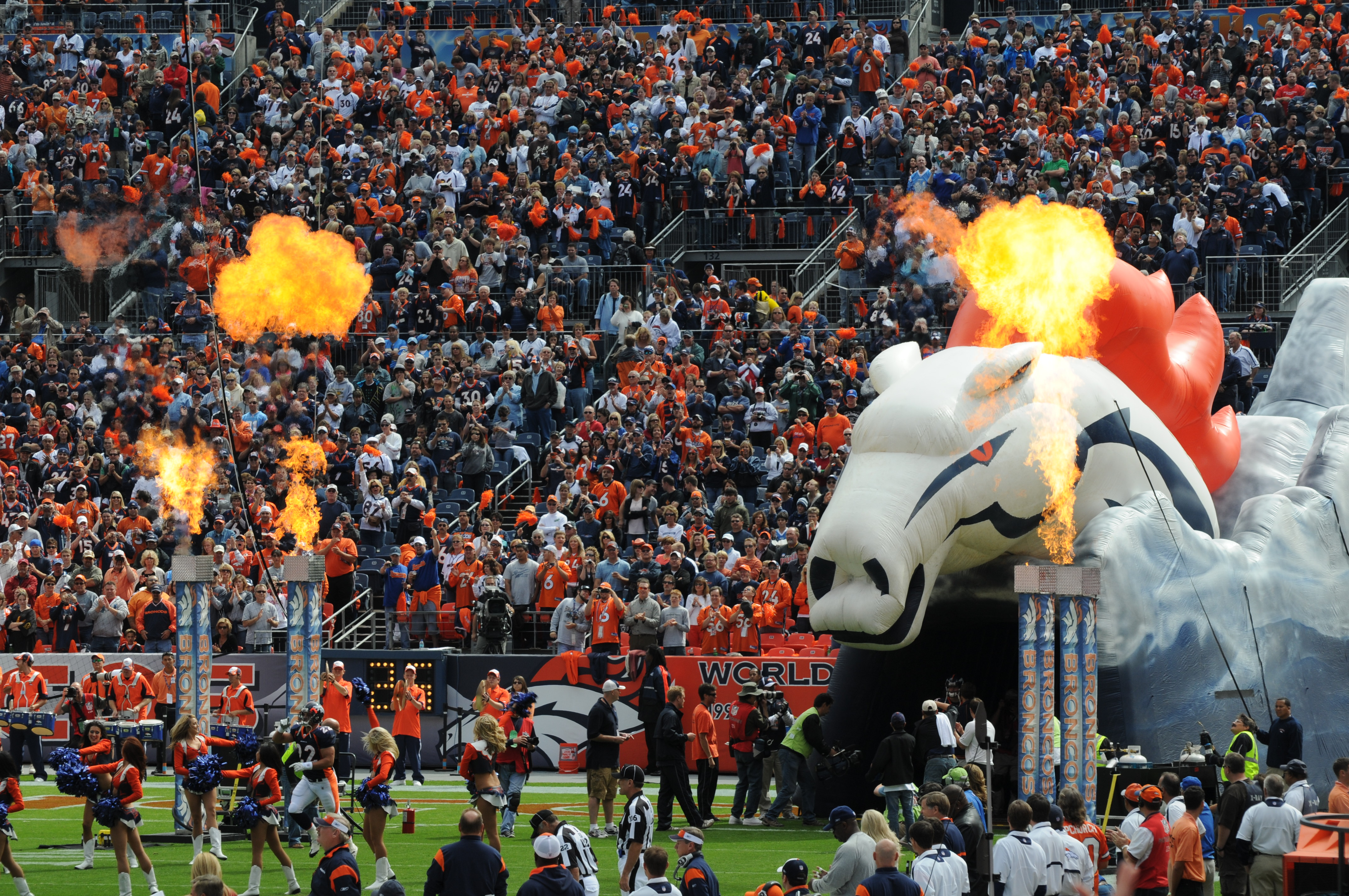
Denver Broncos entrance

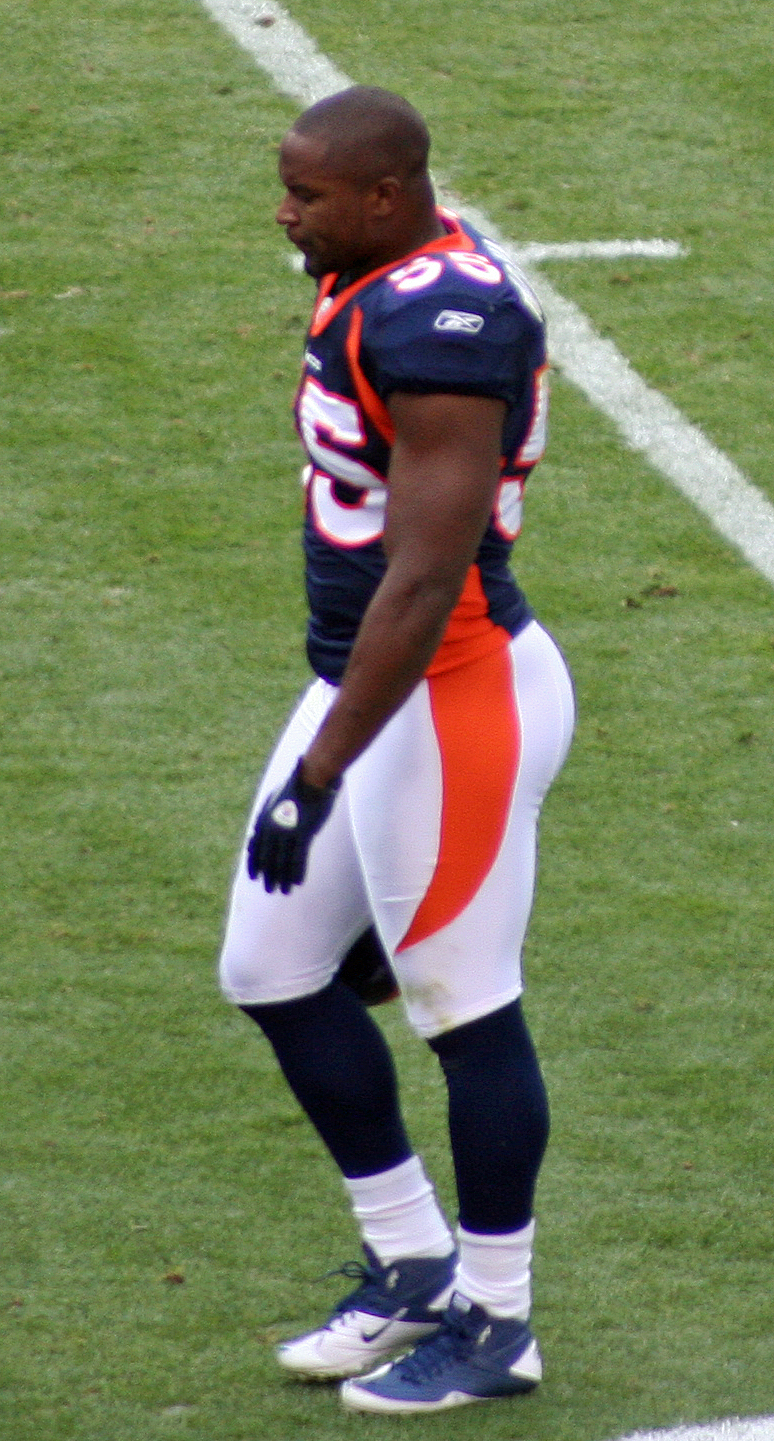
Broncos' linebacker D. J. Williams, October 24, 2010

With their new quarterback, Denver began 2009 well by winning the first six games. The first three wins included a rally at the Bengals, 12–7, as well as relatively easy wins vs. the Browns, 27–6, and Raiders, 23–3. The next three wins came against a tougher stretch of opponents, vs. the Cowboys, 17–10, vs. the Patriots, 20–17 in overtime, and Chargers, 34–23. The Broncos' revamped defense played a huge role in each of the six wins.

But after the bye week, the team suddenly collapsed, losing four in a row. They managed to break their losing streak, with back-to-back routs of the Giants and Chiefs. Those would be the Broncos' last wins, as they dropped their remaining four matches, including a one-point loss to the Raiders at home followed by a close 30–27 defeat at the Eagles. Denver's last hope of getting into the playoffs ended with a 44–24 home loss to Kansas City. Ending the season with an 8–8 team record, Kyle Orton had 21 touchdowns, 12 interceptions, 3,802 yards and a quarterback rating of 86.8.

While starting out with a 6–0 record, an ankle injury against the Washington Redskins and injuries to the offensive line caused Orton to struggle late in the season. Despite putting up 431 yards in the regular season finale against the Kansas City Chiefs, it was two interceptions from Orton that brought the Broncos' season to a close and ended Denver's chance of a playoff appearance.

With a potentially uncapped 2010 NFL season, Orton became a restricted free agent, but later signed a tender on April 16, 2010.

Notable offseason roster moves included the trades of fullback Peyton Hillis (to the Cleveland Browns for quarterback Brady Quinn), wide receiver Brandon Marshall (to the Miami Dolphins for draft picks) and tight end Tony Scheffler (three-team trade with the Detroit Lions and Philadelphia Eagles), as well as the draft selections of Georgia Tech wide receiver Demaryius Thomas and All-American Florida quarterback Tim Tebow. Tebow was a heavily hyped draft pick, partly because Denver traded three draft picks to select him.

On August 4, shortly after the start of training camp, the Broncos suffered a devastating blow to their defense, when outside linebacker/defensive end Elvis Dumervil suffered a torn pectoral muscle in practice. Though there was speculation that Dumervil would be able to return as early as November, he was placed on Injured Reserve on September 3, and missed the entire 2010 season. Also on August 4, the Broncos added free-agent running back and Denver native LenDale White to their roster. However, on September 2, during the team's last preseason game (at the Vikings), White suffered a torn Achilles tendon, and missed the entire 2010 season. On September 4, wide receiver Brandon Stokley was placed on injured reserve, and later released.

The Broncos opened the 2010 season with a 24–17 loss to the Jaguars, in which the teams alternated scores, but the Broncos never led in the game. On September 14, two days after the loss to the Jaguars, the Broncos acquired running back Laurence Maroney in a trade from the New England Patriots (for a 2011 fourth-round selection). In Week 2, the Broncos cruised to a relatively easy 31–14 win against the Seattle Seahawks, in the team's home opener. On September 20, just a day after the win over the Seahawks, tragedy struck the Broncos organization, when wide receiver Kenny McKinley was found dead in his Centennial, Colorado home of an apparent suicide, at the age of 23. In Week 3, the Broncos lost 27–13 at home to the Indianapolis Colts. Kyle Orton threw for a career-high 476 yards, but the Broncos were plagued by red-zone miscues. In Week 4, the Broncos rallied for a 26–20 win at the Tennessee Titans. In Week 5, the Broncos lost 31–17 to the Baltimore Ravens at M&T Bank Stadium, a venue that has been none too kind to the Broncos. In Week 6, the Broncos suffered a heartbreaking 24–20 loss at home to the Jets, aided by a costly pass interference penalty on safety Renaldo Hill that enabled the Jets to rally for the win in the game's final two minutes. In Week 7, the Broncos were annihilated 59–14 at home by the Raiders for their worst loss since 1963. In Week 8, the Broncos lost 24–16 to the 49ers. The game was played at Wembley Stadium in London, as part of the International Series.

Following the team's Week 9 bye, the Broncos cruised to a relatively easy 49–29 home win over the Chiefs in Week 10. Kyle Orton had a career-high four touchdown passes and threw for 296 yards. His passer rating was 131.5 earning him the title of AFC offensive player of the week. In Week 11, the Broncos were no match for the Chargers on Monday Night Football, losing 35–14 at Qualcomm Stadium.

On November 27, 2010, just a day before the team's 36–33 home loss to the St. Louis Rams in Week 12, the Broncos and head coach Josh McDaniels were fined $50,000 each as a result of a videotaping scandal, during the team's aforementioned Week 8 game against the San Francisco 49ers in London. In Week 13, the Broncos fell 10–6 to the Chiefs, clinching the team's third losing season since 1999 and removing them from playoff contention. Afterwards, Josh McDaniels was fired and running backs coach Eric Studesville took his place for the remainder of the season. McDaniels's tenure as head coach, which had gotten off to a good beginning with the team's 6–0 start to the 2009 season, ultimately turned into a total fiasco with a win–loss record of 11–17 before his firing, combined with the Raiders disaster, the expenditure of first-round draft picks on Tim Tebow (who could have been taken in the second or third round), the videotaping episode, and the trading away of key players such as Brandon Marshall. In Week 14, the Broncos were crushed 43–13 at the Arizona Cardinals. In Week 15, the Broncos lost 39–23 to the Raiders, in Tim Tebow's first career start. In Week 16, the Broncos rallied for a 24–23 win over the Texans, on the strength of Tim Tebow throwing for 308 yards and a touchdown, as well as rushing for another touchdown. In Week 17, the Broncos fell 33–28 at home to the Chargers to finish 4–12.

=== Tebow Time ===
In 2011, for the first time in 12 years, former Broncos quarterback John Elway returned to his old team, as general manager, a position he would maintain until 2020. McDaniels' replacement as head coach was (surprisingly enough), John Fox, who wasn't re-signed from Carolina after that team finished 2–14. After taking linebacker Von Miller from Texas A&M with the 2nd pick in the 2011 draft, the Broncos' offseason was marked by waffling over the fate of Kyle Orton. It was widely expected that he would be traded to Miami where he could be reunited with Brandon Marshall, but negotiations broke down and he remained a Bronco.

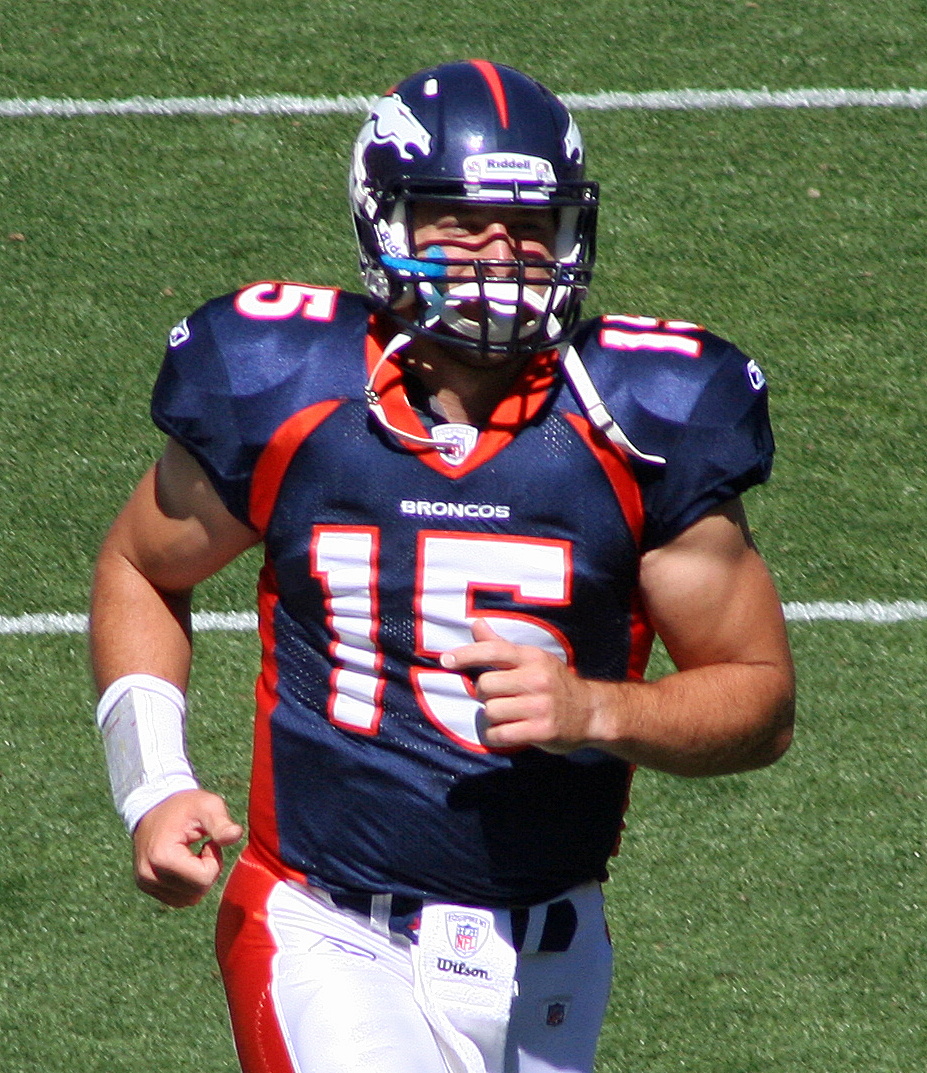
Tim Tebow was the Broncos starting quarterback in 2011.

Tim Tebow was relegated to third-string quarterback behind Orton and Brady Quinn as the Broncos opened on Monday Night Football against their rival, the Oakland Raiders. There was no repeat of the 59–14 blowout, but an extraordinarily sloppy game ensued as both teams racked up penalties. In the third quarter, Orton threw an interception that the Raiders used to set up a 63-yard field goal by Sebastian Janikowski (only the third of this length in league history) and eventually won 23–20.

Kyle Orton's playing suffered under repeated fan calls to switch to Tim Tebow as their starter and the Broncos entered their bye week at 1–4. Tebow was then installed as starting quarterback and Orton cut loose as a free agent. At this point, the Broncos' fortunes quickly turned around. They beat the struggling Dolphins in what was described as Tebow's triumphant return to his home town of Miami. The Broncos won their next six games all in spite of numerous controversies over Tebow's playing style (an overwhelmingly run-based quarterback in a season where quarterbacks like Drew Brees set record passing stats). In Week 15, the Patriots arrived in Denver and rolled over the Broncos. They lost their two remaining games to Buffalo and Kansas City, but were still able to clinch the AFC West title and host a playoff game. For the second time in four seasons, the AFC Western Division was a tie among teams with an 8–8 record, the title being decided by tie-breakers.

Hosting their first playoff game since 2005, the Broncos battled the Pittsburgh Steelers in the wild card round. The game went into overtime and on the opening drive, Tebow threw Demaryius Thomas a 20-yard pass and Thomas took it 80 yards to the house winning 29–23. Denver's improbable season came to an end when they headed to New England and were again buried by the Patriots 45–10.

== 2012–2015: Arrival of Peyton Manning ==
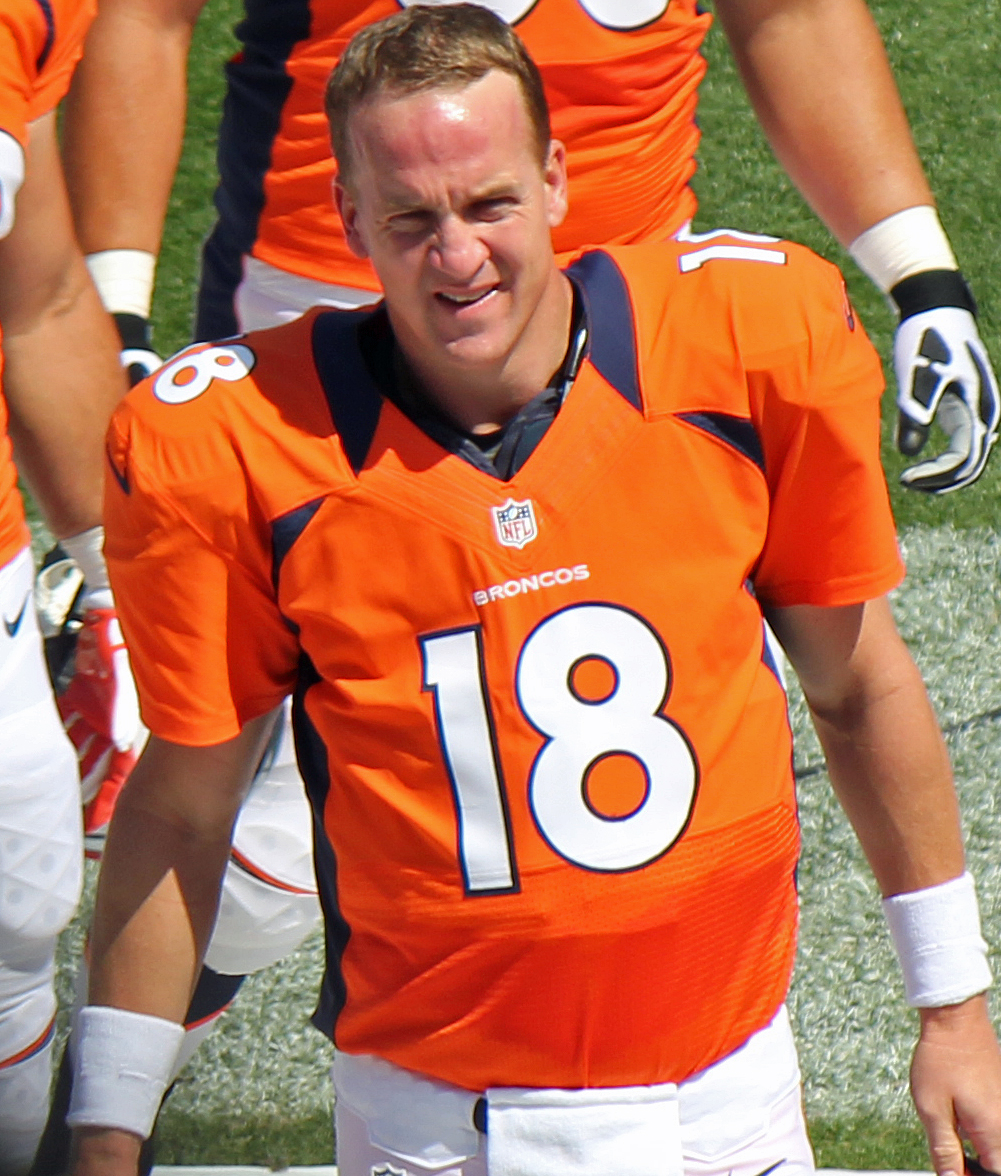
Star quarterback Peyton Manning signed with the Broncos in 2012, leading the team to two Super Bowl appearances with one win.

Most football analysts dismissed the Broncos' playoff run as a fluke resulting from bad luck and a weak AFC West division. Thus, on March 20, the Broncos signed Peyton Manning, who had just been released by the Indianapolis Colts. The following day, Tebow, despite being extremely popular with most of the Bronco fanbase, was traded to the New York Jets in exchange for a fourth-round draft selection.

=== 2012 ===
Despite widespread skepticism about Manning's age, injuries, and rustiness, he delivered an impressive performance in the season opener at home against the Pittsburgh Steelers (a rematch of the previous season's wild-card game), throwing for 253 yards and two touchdown passes in a 31–19 Broncos' victory. Manning also threw his 400th touchdown pass in that game, the third quarterback to do so after Dan Marino and Brett Favre (Manning did it faster than either, however). Knowshon Moreno ran for another touchdown and cornerback Tracy Porter intercepted Ben Roethlisberger in a mirror image of his celebrated interception returns during the 2009 postseason.

Following that, however, the Broncos lost two straight, to the Atlanta Falcons (27–21), and the Houston Texans (31–25). In Week 4, the Denver Broncos faced their most hated rival, the Oakland Raiders; the Broncos dominated the game from the start and won 37–6. In Week 5, they traveled to New England, rekindling the Brady-Manning rivalry of seasons prior. Despite being blown out twice last year, Manning and the Broncos managed to keep it close, but ultimately lost 31–21. In Week 6, the Broncos faced another division rival, the San Diego Chargers; the Broncos were 2–3 at the time while the Chargers were 3–2. At half-time, the Broncos were being blown out 24–0. However, in the second half, Manning threw for three touchdown passes, cornerbacks Tony Carter and Chris Harris intercepted Philip Rivers, and the Chargers were held scoreless. In a comeback victory, the Broncos topped the Chargers 35–24 and tied for first in the AFC West.

What the Broncos did not know at the time, however, was that their victory over the Chargers would be the start of a complete turnaround. Following a Week 7 bye, the Broncos won their final ten games to compile an 11-game win streak. Throughout all of this, Manning silenced his critics by playing at an MVP-caliber level and the Broncos' offensive and defensive numbers rose in the rankings along with him. The Broncos ended the season at 13–3, clinching both the AFC West (their first consecutive division title since 1986–1987) and the AFC's #1 seed. On January 12, 2013, the Broncos made their 2013 playoff debut against the Baltimore Ravens in Denver, only to lose 38–35 in double overtime. Baltimore went on to win Super Bowl XLVII.

=== 2013: Record-breaking offense ===
In 2013, the Broncos went 13–3, and scored a record 606 points in the season, including an NFL-record 55 touchdown passes from Manning, in completing the first division title three-peat in their history. This time, they lived up to preseason expectations, defeating San Diego 24–17 (after leading 17–0) in the AFC Divisional, and New England 26–16 (after leading 20–3) in the AFC Championship to advance to face the NFC champion Seattle Seahawks in Super Bowl XLVIII, at MetLife Stadium in East Rutherford, New Jersey. Coming into the game, the team was a 2.5-point favorite, but on the opening play, Manning missed an errant snap, resulting in a Seahawks' safety. This was the start of a miserable game for the Broncos, as they were drilled 43–8 by the Seahawks, the third-largest blowout in Super Bowl history (the largest, ironically, was the 1989 Broncos' losing Super Bowl XXIV 55–10). The game was never in doubt, as the Seahawks led 36–0 at one point. The Broncos were one of the few teams ever to attempt (and complete) a 2-point conversion in the Super Bowl. The 8-point play was scored when the game was already out of reach. The Broncos' team that scored an NFL-record 606 points in the regular season, along with another 50 in the playoffs, was held to just 8 points in the game by the No. 1-ranked Seahawks' defense.

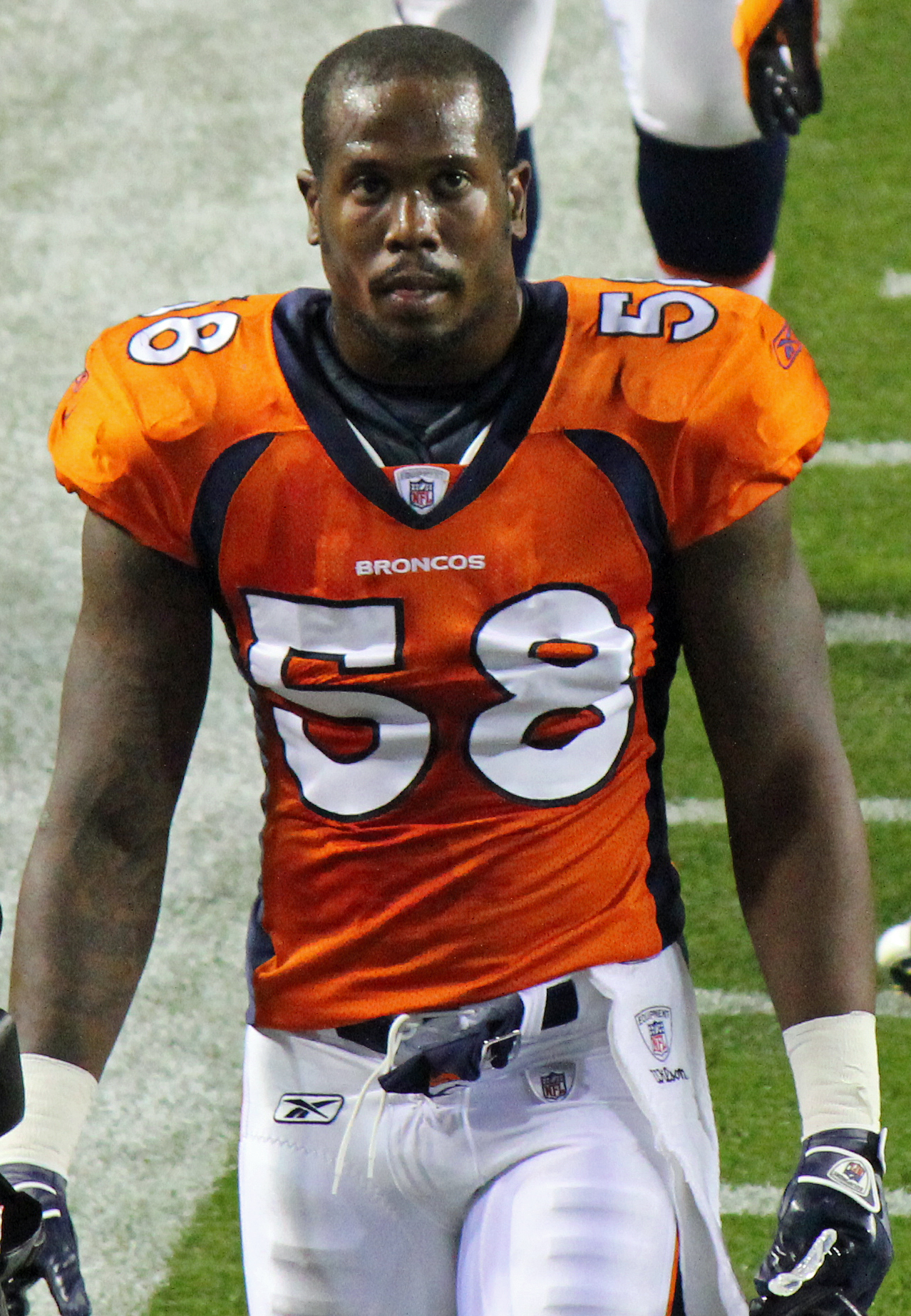
Linebacker Von Miller, drafted 2nd overall in 2011, anchored the Broncos defense while with the team.

=== 2014–2015: Manning's final years and Super Bowl victory ===
In 2014, the Broncos attempted to return to the Super Bowl and win. They beat Manning's previous team, the Indianapolis Colts, and then defeated the Kansas City Chiefs. Their week 3 game was billed as a Super Bowl rematch against the Seahawks. The Seahawks seemed to have the game won in the fourth quarter, however Manning led the Broncos on a late-game comeback to tie the game 20–20. Ultimately, however, the Seahawks were the victors with a 26–20 win. Later on in the season, Manning threw for his 509th touchdown against the San Francisco 49ers, the most by any NFL quarterback in NFL history. Denver finished the season at 12–4 and at first place in the AFC West, but lost in the divisional round of the playoffs in a rematch against the Colts, who would go on to lose to the Patriots in the AFC Championship game. The Broncos and head coach John Fox mutually decided to part ways following this season, and Gary Kubiak was hired to replace him.

In 2015, the Broncos, sporting the NFL's top-ranked defense (including the vaunted "No Fly Zone" defensive secondary), completed a 12-4 regular season en route to the franchise's NFL-record-tying eighth Super Bowl at Levi's Stadium in Santa Clara, California. The season began with a seven-game winning streak interrupted by a road loss to Manning's old team. Peyton Manning broke the all-time passing yardage record previously held by Brett Favre in a week nine home loss to the Kansas City Chiefs. However, the day's celebration was hollow as Manning was intercepted four times and ultimately benched during the game in favor of backup quarterback Brock Osweiler due to injury and a decline in performance. Osweiler helped the Broncos to five wins in seven starts in relief of the injured Manning, including overtime triumphs over eventual playoff teams Cincinnati and New England. Manning returned to the lineup during the final week of the regular season, helping the Broncos rally to a victory over the San Diego Chargers. A Patriots loss to Miami coupled with the Broncos' win, allowed Denver to enjoy the AFC's top seed and home-field advantage for the playoffs.

Denver defeated the Pittsburgh Steelers 23–16 in the divisional round and got a second victory over the Patriots in the AFC Championship game by the score of 20–18. The Broncos' victory was sealed when cornerback Bradley Roby intercepted a 2-point conversion attempt with less than a minute to go in the game. Super Bowl 50 pitted the Broncos against the favored Carolina Panthers. The Broncos' defense created three lost fumbles and an interception and scored a defensive touchdown to power the team to a 24–10 victory, the third NFL title for the franchise. Von Miller, who had 2.5 sacks and two forced fumbles, was named the game's Most Valuable Player. Peyton Manning made history as the first quarterback to start and win a Super Bowl for two teams. Gary Kubiak became the fourth coach to win a Super Bowl in his first year with a new team. The Broncos' third championship tied them for seventh-most Super Bowl wins all-time, along with the Washington Redskins and Oakland Raiders.

== 2016–2021: Post-Peyton Manning struggles ==
=== Quarterback carousel and Vance Joseph ===
One month after the Super Bowl win, Manning announced his retirement from professional football after 18 seasons, and Brock Osweiler left the Broncos for the Houston Texans in free agency, signing a lucrative 4-year deal worth up to $72 million. This left a wide-open competition for the quarterback position, with former third-string quarterback Trevor Siemian beating out trade acquisition Mark Sanchez and rookie Paxton Lynch. Siemian led the Broncos to a 9–7 record in 2016, their fifth straight winning season and sixth over .500, but the Broncos barely missed out on the playoffs, ending their string of five consecutive division titles. Following the season, Gary Kubiak stepped down as head coach due to health issues, and he was replaced by Miami Dolphins defensive coordinator Vance Joseph.

The 2017 season saw the Broncos fall to 5–11, their first losing season since 2010. Siemian began struggling with poor play and injury, allowing Lynch and Brock Osweiler, who returned to the Broncos after brief stints with the Texans and Cleveland Browns, to see playing time. A notable incident occurred during a week 12 game against the Oakland Raiders, when cornerback Aqib Talib got into a fight with Raiders receiver Michael Crabtree for the second year in a row, resulting in both players getting suspended. The following season, the Broncos signed quarterback Case Keenum, who had helped the Minnesota Vikings reach the NFC championship game. Keenum won the starting job over Lynch, who was subsequently waived, and the Broncos also saw the emergence of two rookies: running back Phillip Lindsay and linebacker Bradley Chubb. However, the Broncos finished at 6–10, marking only the second time they had back-to-back losing seasons since the 1971/72 seasons, leading to the firing of Vance Joseph after only two seasons.

=== 2019–2021: Vic Fangio years ===
On January 10, 2019, the Broncos hired former Bears defensive coordinator Vic Fangio as their head coach. The Broncos once again shook up their quarterback room, acquiring longtime Ravens starter Joe Flacco in a trade and subsequently sending away Case Keenum to the Washington Redskins. Joe Flacco's season was ended after a back injury that landed him on injured reserve. Flacco led the Broncos to a 2–6 record before being placed on injured reserve and second-year quarterback Brandon Allen was named the starter. Notable drafted players included tight end Noah Fant and quarterback Drew Lock. On June 13, 2019, longtime owner Pat Bowlen died at age 75 after a long battle with Alzheimer's disease. The 2019 Broncos finished 7–9 for their third consecutive losing season, the longest such stretch of losing seasons since a nine-year stretch from 1963 to 1972.

In 2020, with Lock established as the team's starting quarterback, the team regressed even further, finishing with a 5–11 record, their fourth straight year with a losing record. Notably in the offseason, the team drafted wide receiver Jerry Jeudy in the first round of that year's draft. Jeudy would go on to have a respectable rookie season, with 856 yards receiving and three touchdowns.

In the offseason, the Broncos would make a change at quarterback by trading for Teddy Bridgewater from the Carolina Panthers, which relegated Lock to a backup role. The 2021 Broncos would start off well with a 3–0 record by the end of September, which included a 26–0 shutout win against the New York Jets to make it the team's best start since 2016 season. However, the team from there would struggle massively, and finished the season on a 4–10 run despite at one point being 7–6 and in contention for a wild card spot. The slump was capped off by a 4-game losing streak to end the season at 7–10, which prompted changes. On January 9, 2022, Vic Fangio (along with most of his coaching staff) was dismissed as head coach after three seasons under his leadership.

== 2022–present: Walton–Penner ownership group ==
=== 2022: Hackett–Wilson tandem ===
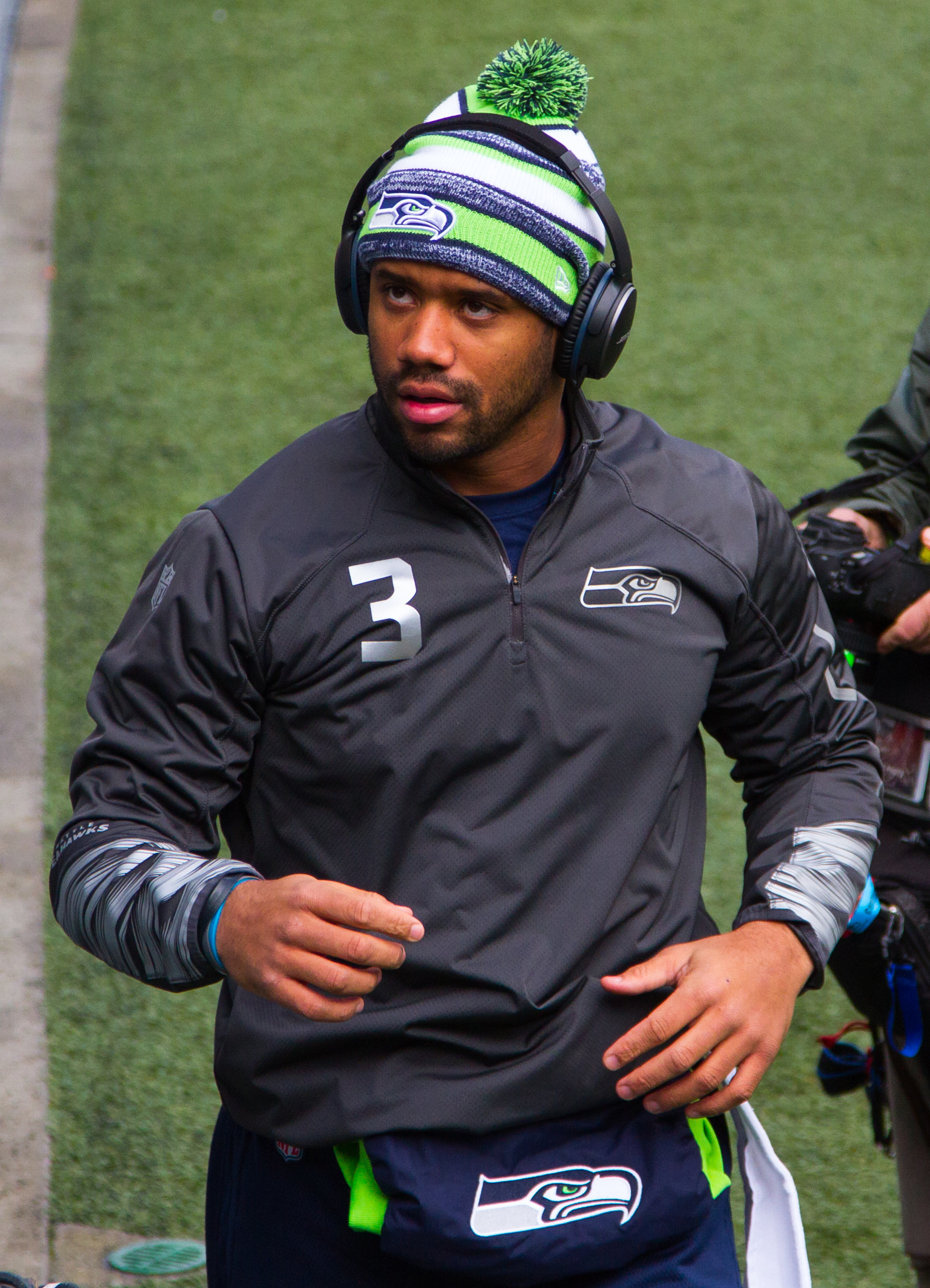
In the offseason, the Broncos completed a blockbuster trade to land Seattle Seahawks quarterback Russell Wilson.

Following the firing of Fangio, the Broncos hired Green Bay Packers offensive coordinator Nathaniel Hackett as head coach on January 27. Less than two months later, the Broncos completed arguably the biggest trade of the 2022 offseason. In a deal with the Seattle Seahawks, the Broncos sent Drew Lock, Noah Fant, Shelby Harris, and five draft picks to the Seahawks in exchange for star quarterback Russell Wilson and a fourth-round selection. Wilson, a nine-time Pro Bowler, had spent the last ten seasons with the Seahawks before being traded to the Broncos.

In early June, the Broncos, after being owned by the Pat Bowlen estate for the last three seasons, were approached by a consortium led by former Walmart chairman Rob Walton to purchase the team. On August 9, the sale of the team was unanimously approved by the NFL's team owners for a price of $4.65 billion, the largest-ever value of a professional sports team at the time of a sale. In addition, Walton brought along several high-ranking individuals to be a part of the ownership group, most notably former United States Secretary of State Condoleezza Rice and 7-time Formula One champion Lewis Hamilton. Walton delegated most of his authority to his successor as Walmart chairman, Greg Penner, who became CEO and operating head of the franchise as well as the public face of the Walton-Penner Group. Penner is recognized as the team's controlling owner by the NFL, and represents the Broncos at league meetings.

The team entered the 2022 season with high expectations, however, the season began with a loss to Wilson's former team in the Seahawks. The Broncos struggled during their next two games but won them both to hold a share of first place in their division. From that point, the team performed very poorly; they fell into a 4-game losing streak to fall to 2–5. The team defeated the Jacksonville Jaguars to improve to 3–5, but again fell into another losing streak, losing 5 straight games to fall to 3–10. Notably, the offense was criticized for their poor performances, including a 9–12 overtime loss to the Indianapolis Colts, a 9–16 loss to the New York Jets, and a 9–10 loss to the Baltimore Ravens. They defeated the Arizona Cardinals to snap their 5-game losing streak, but were defeated the following week in blowout fashion by the severely shorthanded Los Angeles Rams on Christmas Day to fall to 4–11. Following the loss, head coach Nathaniel Hackett was fired and replaced with senior assistant Jerry Rosburg.

=== 2023: Sean Payton era begins ===
Following the team's disastrous 2022 season, the Broncos acquired Super Bowl-winning head coach Sean Payton from the New Orleans Saints and named him the new head coach of the Broncos. The Payton era began inauspiciously, as the Broncos began the 2023 season by losing five of their first six games, with one of those losses being a humiliating defeat in which the Broncos' once vaunted defense surrendered a historic 70 points to the Miami Dolphins. However, the team experienced a midseason turnaround and went on a five-game winning streak to improve to 6-5. The winning streak included a two-possession victory over the powerhouse Kansas City Chiefs, which was Denver's first victory over Kansas City since 2015. However, the team stumbled after the win streak and lost three of their next four games. One of those losses came at the hands of the AFC-worst New England Patriots and effectively ended Denver's season. The Broncos would win the next week but were eliminated from playoff contention for the eighth consecutive season thanks to a Kansas City victory on the same day.

=== 2024: First playoff berth since Super Bowl 50 ===
On March 4, 2024, Payton and general manager George Paton announced that the organization would release Wilson at the beginning of the 2024 NFL league year. Wilson's release resulted in an NFL record $85 million dead cap hit.

2024 would be an improvement from the last season as they not only they finished at 10–7, they would clinch a playoff spot for the first time since their Super Bowl winning season since 2015, good enough to finish at 3rd place in the AFC West and the 7th seed of the playoffs. However, their season would come to an end as they got crushed by the Buffalo Bills 31–7.

== Team records ==
- The Broncos all-time regular season record (as of the conclusion of the 2024 season) including AFL games is 518-472-10. Their record since joining the NFL in 1970 is 479–375–6.
- Their all-time playoff record is 23–20.
- John Elway is the Broncos all-time leading passer, with 300 touchdowns and 51,475 yards passing.
- Peyton Manning holds the Broncos records for single-season passing yards (5477) and passing touchdowns (55). Both of these records were set in 2013, and both are also NFL records.
- Terrell Davis is the Broncos all-time leading rusher, with 60 touchdowns and 7,607 yards rushing.
- Rod Smith is the Broncos all-time leading receiver, with 68 touchdowns, 11,389 yards receiving.
- Jason Elam is the Broncos all-time leading scorer, with 1,786 points. He also holds the record for games played as a Bronco, with 236. The Broncos have won 3 Super Bowls to date.

== Books ==
- Larry Gordan, "Barely Audible: A History of the Denver Broncos" (Graphic Impressions, 1975) ISBN 978-0-914628-01-9
- Woodrow "Woody" Paige, "Orange Madness: The Incredible Odyssey of the Denver Broncos" (Crowell, 1978) ISBN 978-0-690-01776-2
- Terry Frei, "'77: Denver, The Broncos, and a Coming of Age" (Taylor Trade Publishing, 2007) ISBN 978-1-58979-213-5
- Larry Zimmer, "Stadium Stories: Colorful Tales of the Blue and Orange" (The Globe Pequot Press, 2004) ISBN 978-0-7627-2766-7
