= Edgar Kaiser =

Edgar Kaiser may refer to:

- Edgar Kaiser Sr. (1908–1981), American industrialist, son of Henry J. Kaiser and father of Edgar Kaiser, Jr
- Edgar Kaiser Jr. (1942–2012), financier and owner of the Denver Broncos football team
