= Kaiser Foundation =

Canadian mental health organization

The Kaiser Foundation is a mental health organization based in Canada. Its stated mission is to assist individuals and communities in preventing and reducing the harm associated with problem substance use and addictive behaviours. Although founded by a related person, it is not the same organisation as the Kaiser Family Foundation based in the United States. It was founded in 1985 by Edgar Kaiser Jr.
