= Henry J. Kaiser =

American industrialist (1882–1967)

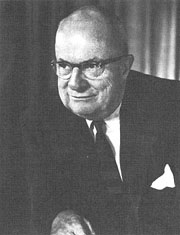
- Born: Henry John Kaiser; May 9, 1882; Sprout Brook, New York, U.S.
- Died: August 24, 1967 (aged 85); Honolulu, Hawaii, U.S.
- Occupations: Industrialist, shipbuilder
- Children: Edgar Kaiser Sr. Henry Kaiser, Jr.
- Relatives: Edgar Kaiser Jr. (grandson); Henry Kaiser (grandson)

Henry John Kaiser (May 9, 1882 – August 24, 1967) was an American industrialist who became known for his shipbuilding and construction projects, then later for his involvement in fostering modern American health care. Prior to World War II, Kaiser was involved in the construction industry; his company was one of those that built the Hoover Dam. He established the Kaiser Shipyards, which built Liberty ships during World War II, after which he formed Kaiser Aluminum and Kaiser Steel. Kaiser organized Kaiser Permanente health care for his workers and their families. He led Kaiser-Frazer followed by Kaiser Motors, automobile companies known for the safety of their designs. Kaiser was involved in large construction projects such as civic centers and dams, and invested in real estate, later moving into television broadcasting with Kaiser Broadcasting.

== Early life, family and education ==
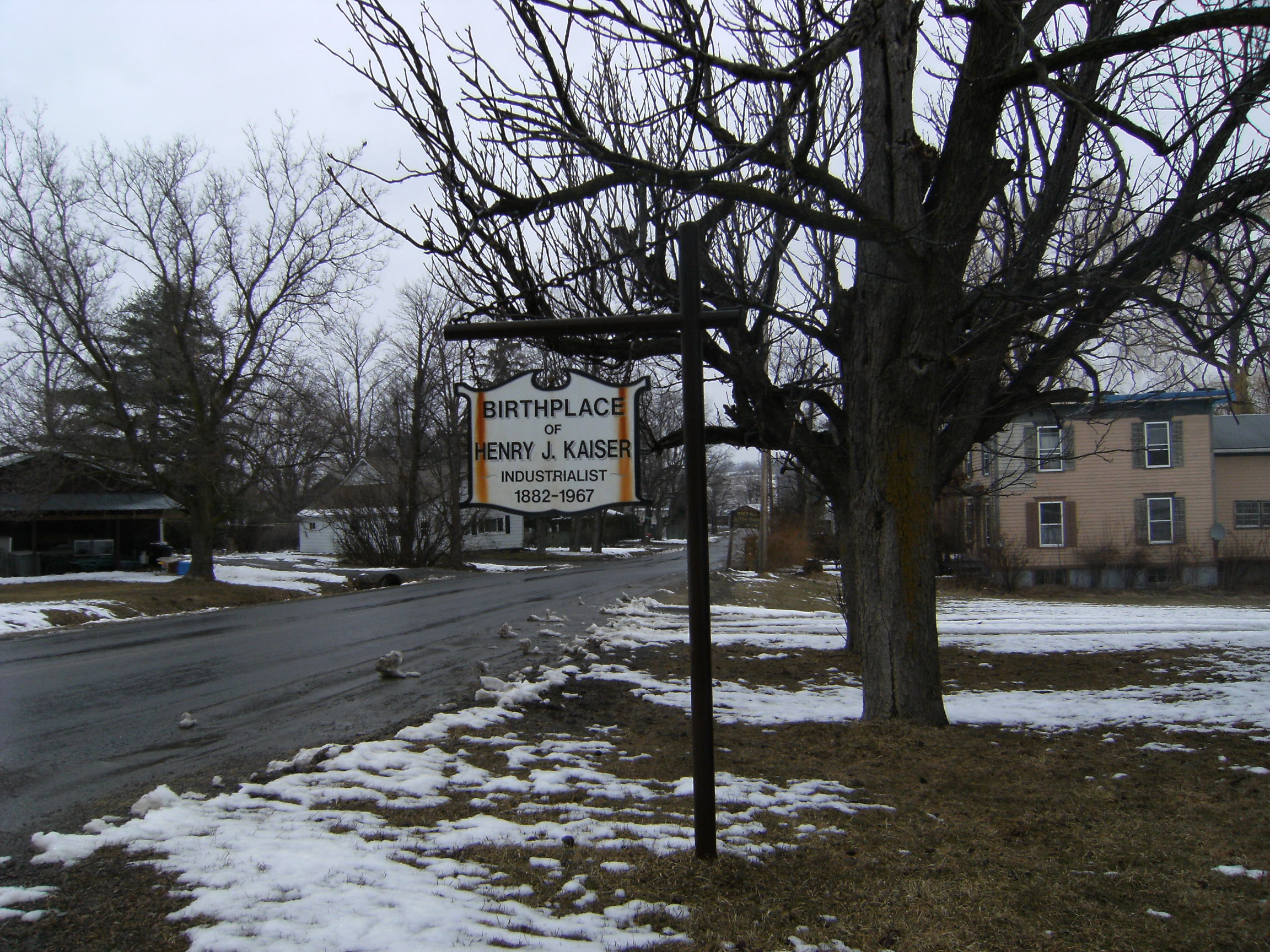
Historical marker outside Kaiser's childhood home

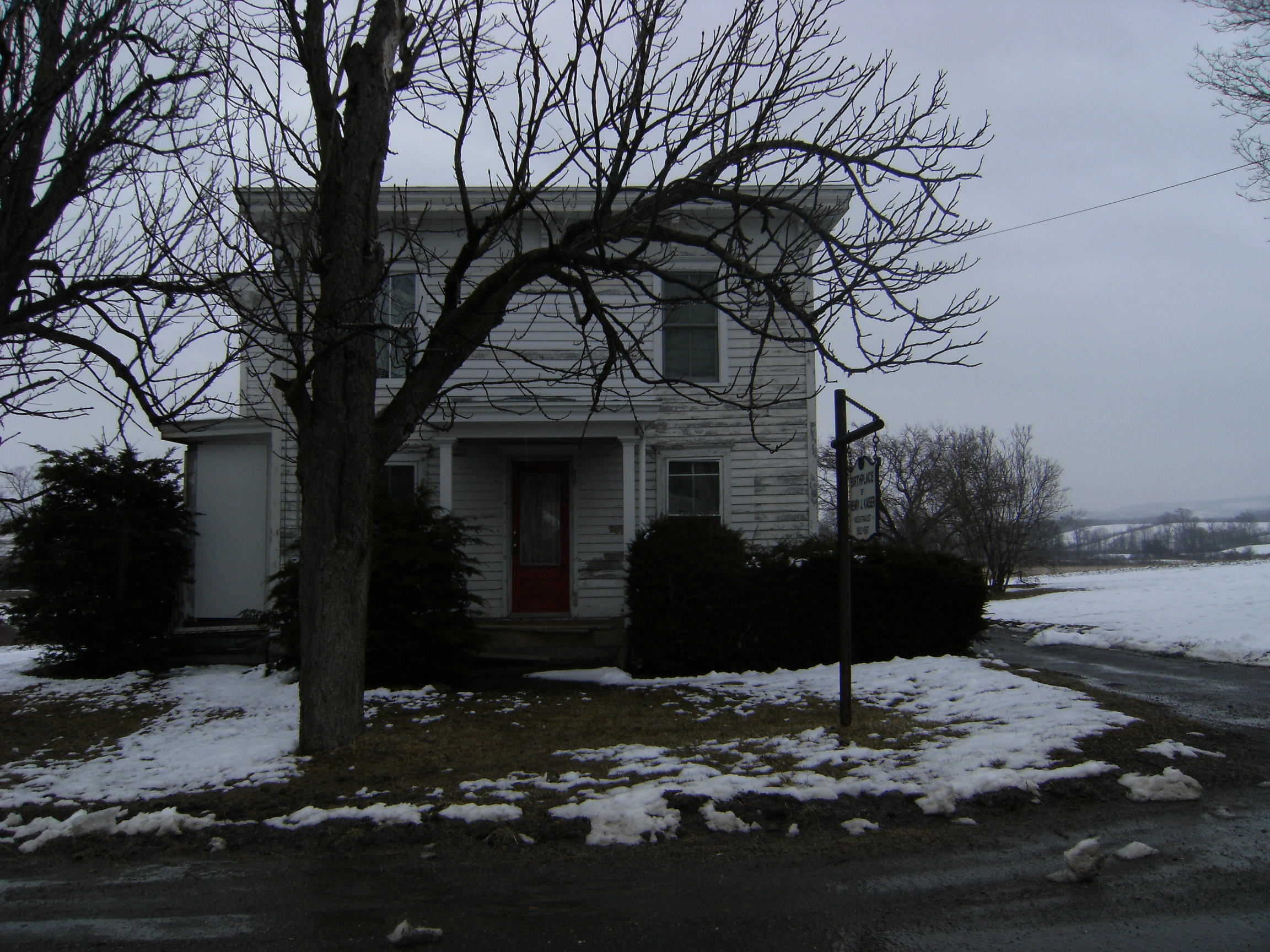
Kaiser was born in this house near Canajoharie, New York.

Kaiser was born on May 9, 1882, in Sprout Brook, New York, the youngest of four children and the only son of Franz (a shoemaker) and Anna Marie (née Yops) Kaiser, ethnic German immigrants. His father, who later anglicized his name to Frank, came from Hanau in Hesse and emigrated to the United States in 1872, at about the age of thirty. He settled in Canajoharie, in upstate New York, where he was taken in by the Yops family—fellow emigrants from Steinheim who farmed in the area—and there met their daughter Anna Marie, later known as Mary. The couple married on January 5, 1873, and settled a few miles away in Sprout Brook, where Frank kept a cobbler's shop; they had three daughters—Elizabeth, Anna, and Augusta—before Henry's birth.

Kaiser was baptized two years after his birth as Heinrich Kaiser. The middle name "John" does not appear in the baptismal record, and Kaiser himself adopted both it and the anglicized form "Henry" in later years. The family was of modest means, and around 1889, apparently for economic reasons, it moved west to Whitesboro, a town of about 1,600 residents near Utica on the Erie Canal. Kaiser was especially close to his mother and his three older sisters. His mother died in 1899, a loss that some accounts cite as an early influence on his later interest in health care.

Although his father was Roman Catholic, Kaiser was raised in his mother's Protestant faith, attending the Methodist church in Sprout Brook. He later became a Presbyterian and in 1939 was confirmed in the Episcopal Church, in which he served as a lay reader. He left school after the eighth grade, at about age thirteen and without a diploma, a step generally attributed to the family's financial circumstances.

== Early career ==
Kaiser's first job was as a cash boy in a Utica, New York, department store at the age of 16. He worked as an apprentice photographer early in life, and was running the studio in Lake Placid by the age of 20.

Kaiser relocated to Spokane and became a top salesman at a hardware company. He used his savings and started a construction company in 1906 which fulfilled government contracts.

In 1914 Kaiser founded a paving company, Henry J. Kaiser Co., Ltd., one of the first to use heavy construction machinery. His firm expanded significantly in 1927 when it received an $18-million contract to build roads in Camagüey Province, Cuba. In 1931 his firm was one of the prime contractors in building the Hoover Dam on the Colorado River, and subsequently the Bonneville and Grand Coulee Dams on the Columbia River.

While doing business among the Six Companies, Inc. and remotely related to his interest in motor boat racing, he set up shipyards in Seattle and Tacoma, where he began using mass-production techniques, such as using welding instead of rivets.

== World War II ==
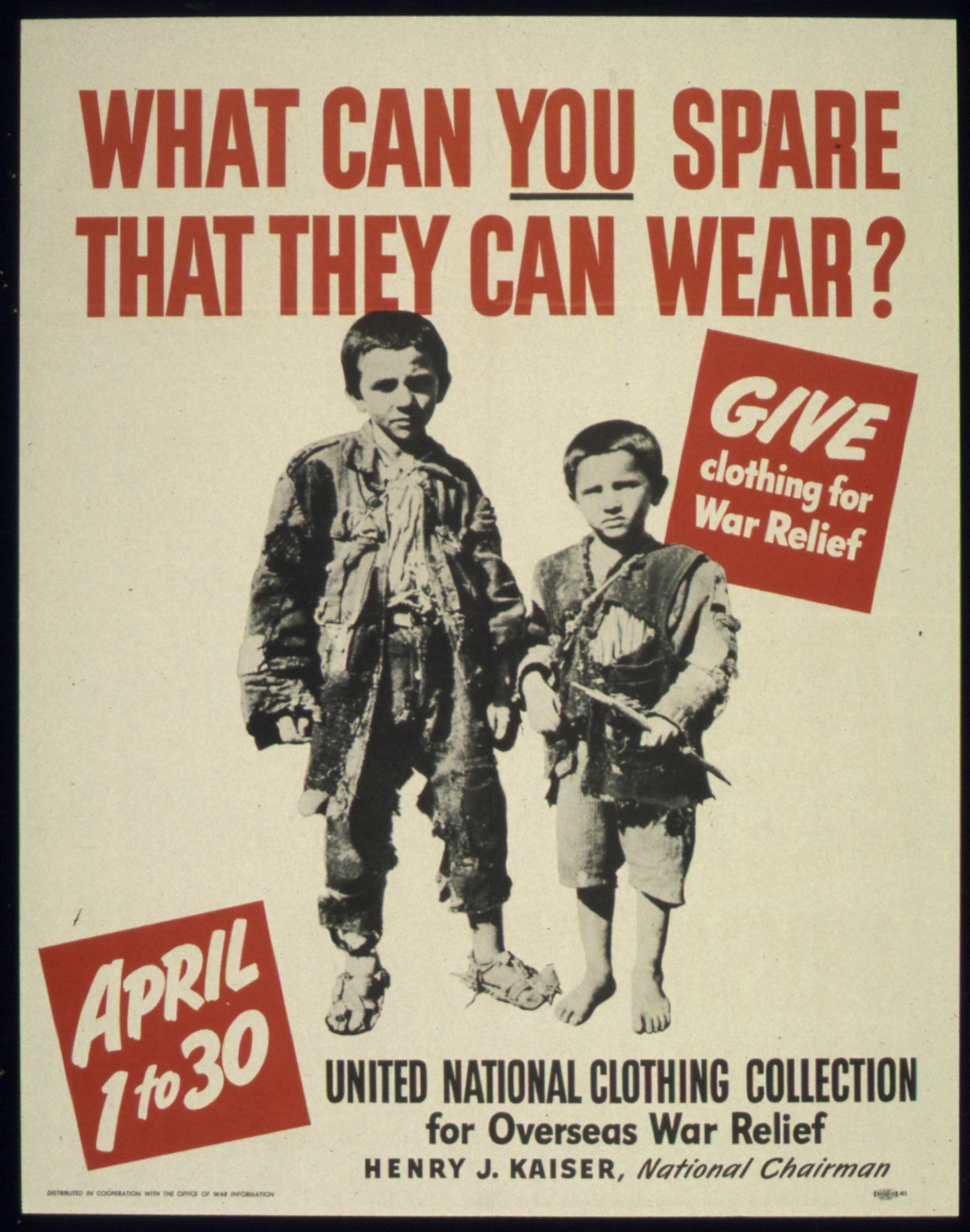
Poster designating Kaiser as national chairman of the United National Clothing Collection

Henry Kaiser was an early advocate of bringing American aid to those suffering from German aggression in Europe. In 1940, a full year before the US had entered World War II, Kaiser served as National Chairman of United Clothing Collection for International War Relief to provide much-needed clothing for the refugees from Hitler's conquests in Europe.

=== Kaiser Shipbuilding ===
Kaiser fought Hitler far more directly with what he is most famous for: the Kaiser Shipyard in Richmond, California; during World War II adapting production techniques to enable building cargo ships with an average construction time of 45 days. These ships became known as Liberty ships and were later supplemented in the mid-war period by improved, larger and faster Victory ships. He became world-renowned when his teams built a ship in four days. The keel for the 10,500-ton SS Robert E. Peary was laid on Sunday, November 8, 1942, and the ship was launched in California from the Richmond Shipyard#2 on Thursday, November 12, four days and 15 1/2 hours later. The previous record had been ten days for the Liberty ship Joseph M. Teal.

A visit to a Ford assembly plant by one of his associates led to a decision to use welding instead of riveting for shipbuilding. Welding was advantageous because it took less strength to do and it was easier to teach to thousands of employees, who were mostly unskilled laborers and many women. Kaiser adopted the use of sub-assemblies in ship construction. Formerly, hundreds of laborers crowded together to complete a ship. Though that practice had been tried on the East Coast and in Britain, Kaiser was able to take full advantage of the process by constructing new shipyards using this concept.

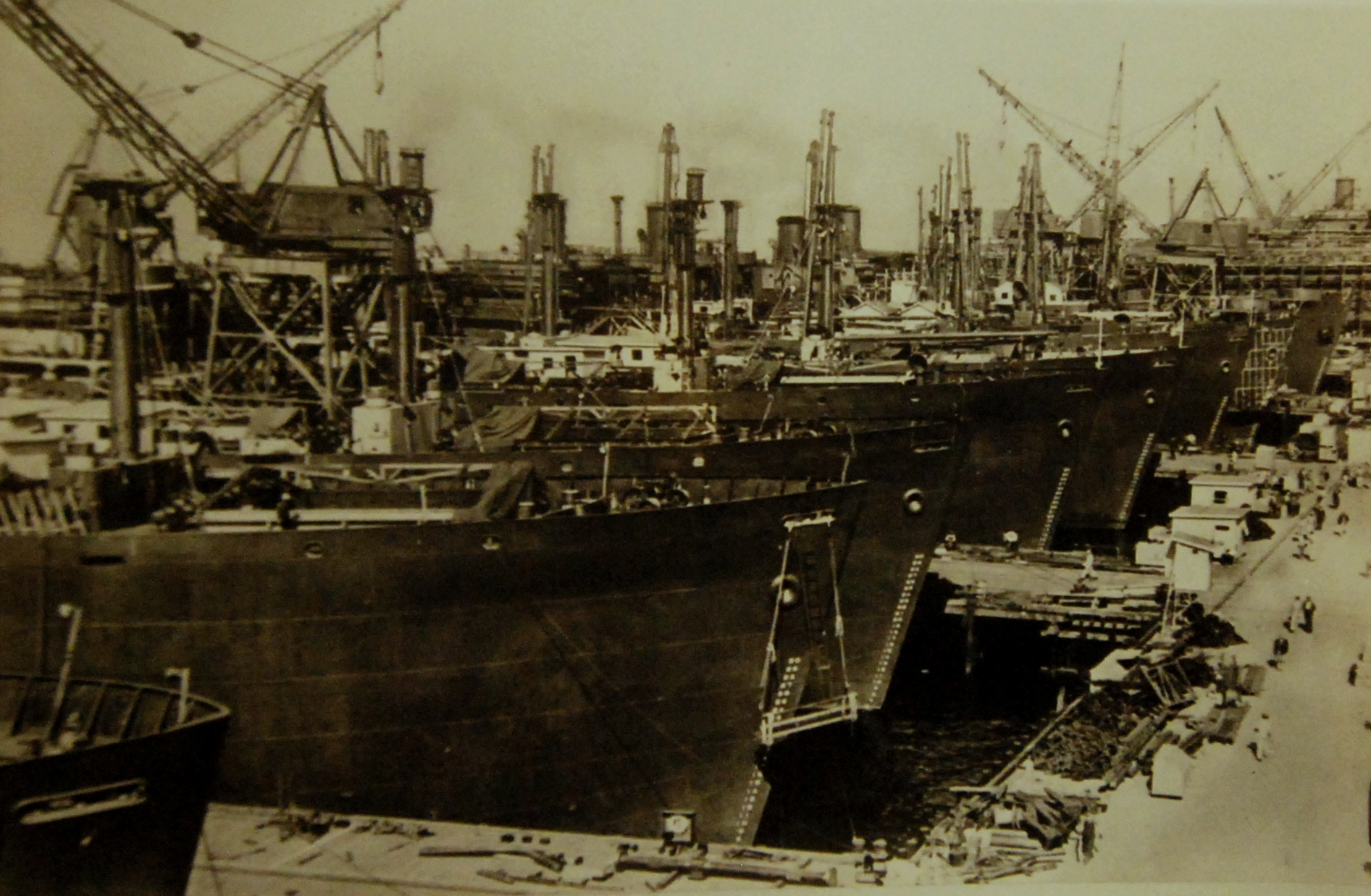
Kaiser-built Liberty ships being outfitted, 1942

Other Kaiser shipyards were located in Ryan Point (Vancouver) on the Columbia River in Washington state and on Swan Island in Portland, Oregon. A smaller vessel was completed in 71 hours and 40 minutes from the Vancouver yard on November 16, 1942. The Kaiser hulls also became America's smaller, more numerous "escort carriers", over 100 small aircraft carriers employed in both the Pacific and the Atlantic theaters. The concepts that he developed for the mass production of commercial and naval ships are still in use.

One problem with welded hulls that was unknown is the issue of brittle fracture. That caused the loss of some Liberty ships in cold seas as the welds failed and the hulls would crack, sometimes completely into two. Constance Tipper was one of the first people to discover why the Liberty ships were breaking into two. Minor changes in design and more rigid welding control implemented in 1947 eliminated Liberty ship losses until 1955. By his membership in a group called the Six Companies, Kaiser also had a major role in the Joshua Hendy Iron Works of Sunnyvale, California, which built the EC-2 triple expansion steam engines for the Liberty ships. Kaiser and his associates organized the California Shipbuilding Corporation.

=== Kaiser Permanente ===
At Kaiser Shipyards in Richmond, California, Kaiser implemented the pioneering idea of Sidney Garfield for a prepaid hospital financing plan. Opened on August 10, 1942, Kaiser Richmond Field Hospital for Kaiser Shipyards was financed by the US Maritime Commission, sponsored by Henry J. Kaiser's Permanente Foundation, and run by Garfield. In part because of wartime materials rationing, the Field Hospital was a single-story wood-frame structure designed in a simple modernist mode. Originally intended for use primarily as an emergency facility, the Field Hospital opened with only 10 beds. Later additions had increased its capacity to 160 beds by 1944.

Kaiser's Richmond Field Hospital served as the mid-level component of a three-tier medical care system that included six well-equipped First Aid Stations at the shipyards and the main Permanente Hospital in Oakland, where the most critical cases were treated. By August 1944, 92.2% of all Richmond shipyard employees had joined Kaiser Permanente, the first voluntary group plan in the country to feature group medical practice, prepayment, and substantial medical facilities on such a large scale. After the war, the Health Plan was expanded to include workers' families. To serve employees at his diverse businesses, Kaiser opened Permanente facilities in Walnut Creek, California; Honolulu, Hawaii; and many other locations. Since then, locations have opened in Hawaii; Dublin, California; Livermore, California; Pleasanton, California; Martinez, California; Santa Clara, California; and Antioch, California.

== Postwar ==
=== Kaiser Automobiles ===
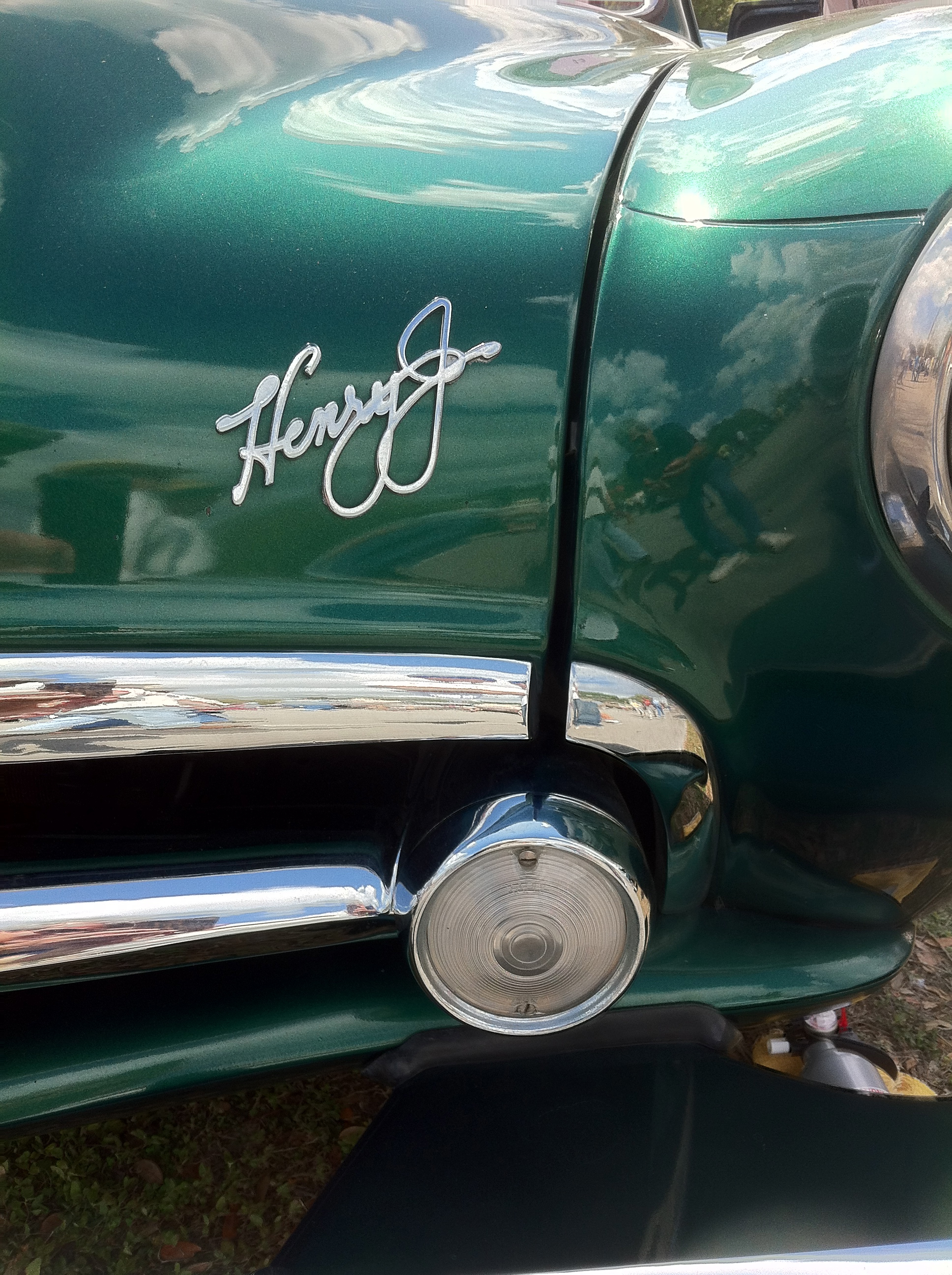
Kaiser's name in script on the front of a 1951 Henry J automobile

==== Kaiser-Frazer ====
In 1945, Kaiser partnered with veteran automobile executive Joseph Frazer to establish a new automobile company from the remnants of Graham-Paige, of which Frazer had been president. Frazer was a respected auto sales executive and was noted for Chrysler's market penetration during the 1930s. The new company was named Kaiser-Frazer. It used a surplus Ford Motor Company defense plant at Willow Run, Michigan originally built for WWII aircraft production by Ford. Kaiser-Frazer (later Kaiser Motors) produced cars under the Kaiser and Frazer names until 1955, when it abandoned the U.S. market and moved production to Argentina. The first K-F models were designed by Howard "Dutch" Darrin and these went from non-existent to number eight in new car sales within two years. Although still producing Jeep vehicles, Kaiser-Willys ceased production of passenger cars in the U.S. after the 1955 model year. They continued producing Kaiser Carabela sedans, identical to the 1955 Kaiser U.S. sedans, in Argentina until 1961.

==== Kaiser Superbus ====
He built the Kaiser Superbus (1946, scrapped 1951) 60 feet in length with room for 63 seated passengers, and two restrooms, was constructed using magnesium, and aluminum. Only one prototype would be built. A small model used by Kaiser's sales team was reconstructed in 2016. It was a highway bus meant to go from train station to train station within the Santa Fe Railway. It was built for Santa Fe Trailways (later Continental Trailways, part of National Trailways Bus System) to run on longer routes, not entirely inside urban areas. Construction took place at the Kaiser Permanente Metals Corporation plant in Los Altos. The first, and only route, was between Los Angeles and San Francisco. Santa Fe Railway had to petition The California State Railroad Commission to operate the bus on state highways as it used a trailer, which were forbidden to use.

==== Henry J. ====
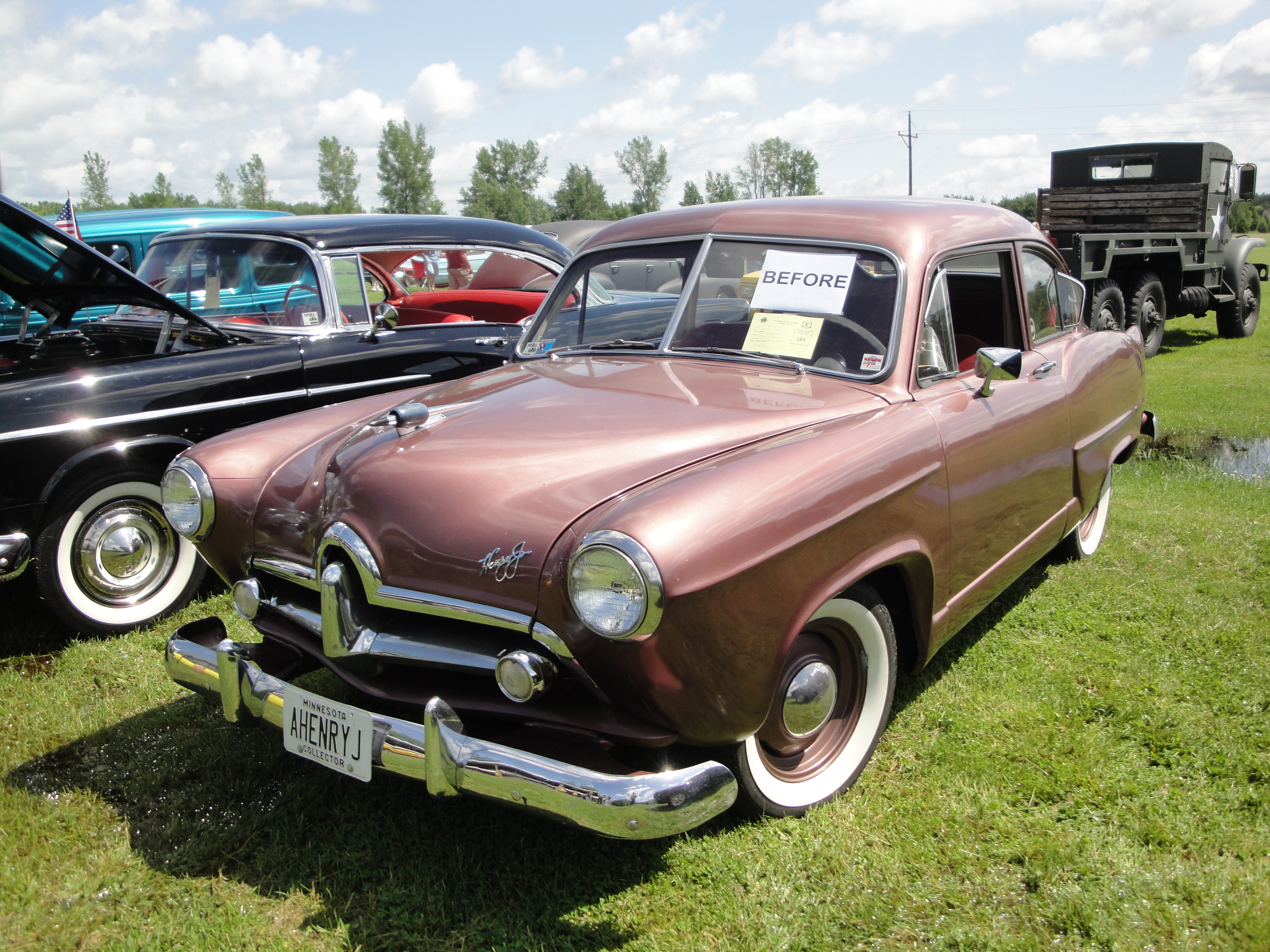
A 1951 Henry J automobile

The Henry J was built by the Kaiser-Frazer Corporation and named after its chairman, Henry J. Kaiser. Production of six-cylinder models began in July 1950, and four-cylinder production started shortly after Labor Day, 1950. Official public introduction was September 28, 1950. The car was marketed through 1954.

Kaiser-Frazer held a contest to name their new car, with Henry J being the winning name. A lawsuit by a shareholder in the company alleged that "The name is so ridiculous that it can be justified on no other ground than to satisfy a deep ingrained megalomanic desire for personal publicity". It is unknown the outcome of the suit and in the end, the car was named after Kaiser.

==== Jeep and South America ====
In 1953, Kaiser purchased Willys-Overland, manufacturer of the Jeep line of utility vehicles, changing its name to Willys Motors. In the late 1960s, Kaiser's South American operations were sold to a Ford-Renault combination. In 1963, the name was changed again to Kaiser-Jeep, which was ultimately sold to American Motors Corporation in 1970. As part of the transaction, Kaiser acquired a 22% interest in AMC, which was later divested.

==== Private projects ====
In the mid-1950s, Kaiser asked William Besler to convert his 1953 Kaiser Manhattan to steam. Besler completed this in either 1957 or 1958. Kaiser did not like the remodeled car and left it with Besler.

=== Kaiser Aluminum ===
Kaiser founded Kaiser Aluminum in 1946 by leasing and later purchasing aluminum facilities in Washington state from the U.S. government. The original facilities included reduction plants at Mead and Tacoma, and a rolling mill at Trentwood. Kaiser Aluminum expanded to become an integrated aluminum company, mining and refining bauxite and creation of alumina, the production of primary aluminum from alumina, and manufacturing fabricated and semi-fabricated aluminum products.

=== Kaiser Family Foundation ===
In 1948, Kaiser established the Henry J. Kaiser Family Foundation (also known as Kaiser Family Foundation), a U.S.-based, nonprofit, private operating foundation focusing on health care issues. Originally based in Oakland, California, it later moved to Menlo Park, California. At Kaiser's death, half of his fortune was left to the foundation. It was reorganized and restructured in 1991, under CEO Drew Altman. The Foundation, not associated with Kaiser Permanente or Kaiser Industries, operates independently as a think tank, making facts and analysis available to policymakers, health care groups, the media and the general public.

=== Real estate ===
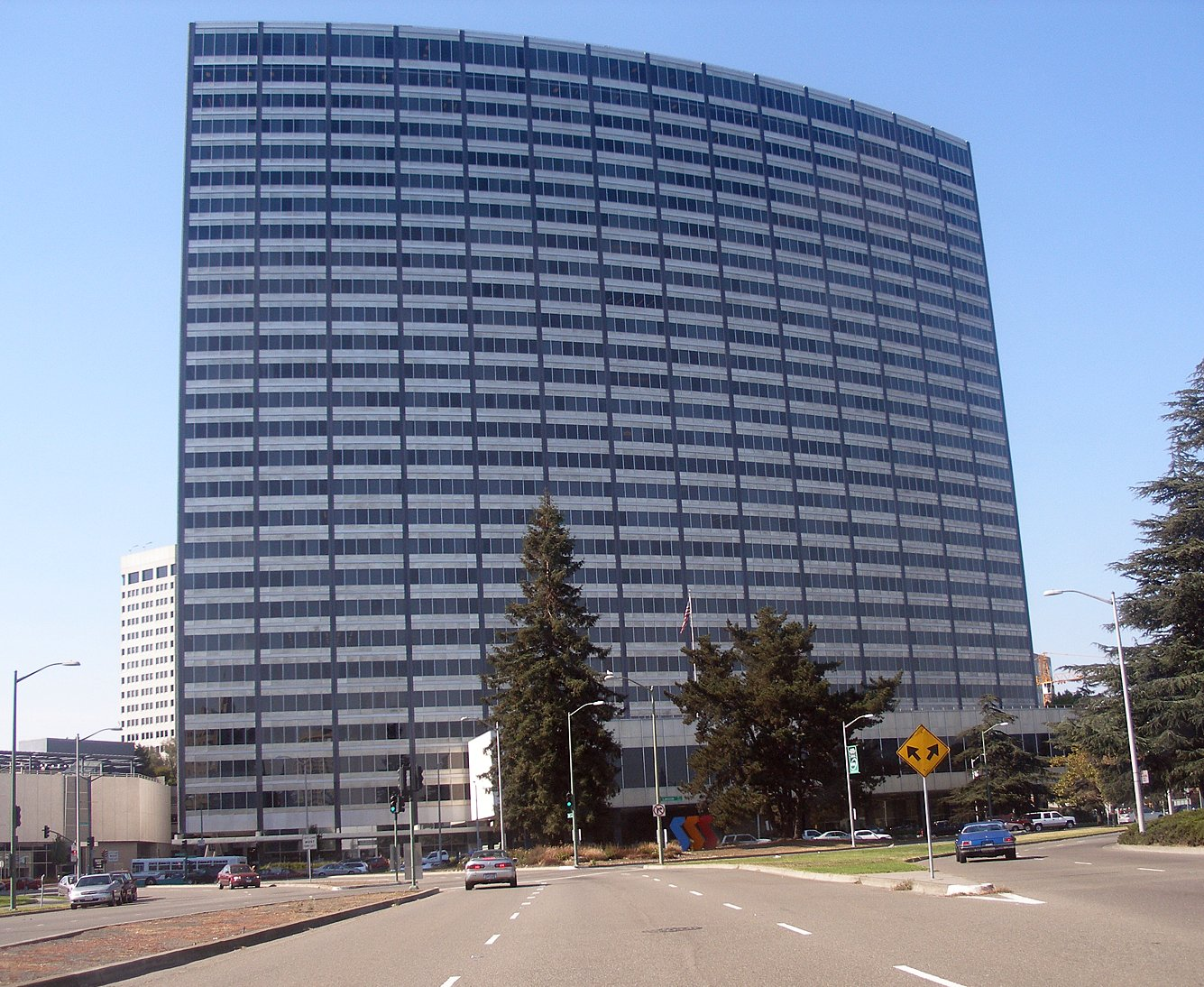
The Kaiser Center in downtown Oakland served as the headquarters of Kaiser Industries. Up to that time, it was Oakland's tallest building, as well as "the largest office tower west of Chicago".

As a real-estate magnate, Kaiser founded the Honolulu suburban community of Hawaiʻi Kai in Hawaiʻi. Kaiser also financed the development of Panorama City, a planned community in the San Fernando Valley portion of Los Angeles. Schools were named in his honor in Hawaii, West Virginia, and California.

==== Hawaii Village Hotel ====
Kaiser spent many of his later years in Honolulu and developed an obsession with perfecting its urban landscape. He built the Kaiser Hawaiian Village Hotel, today known as the Hilton Hawaiian Village, and used bright pink Jeeps as resort transportation. Kaiser constructed one of the first commercially practical geodesic domes in the United States at this resort and used it as a theater.

=== Television ===
In the mid-1950s, Kaiser was convinced that television could make Kaiser brand products known to the public. In 1957 Kaiser partnered with Warner Brothers and ABC to sponsor the television series Maverick, promoting household products including Kaiser aluminum foil and Kaiser Jeep vehicles. In support of his Hawaii ventures, Kaiser induced Warner Brothers to copy the formula of its popular series 77 Sunset Strip as new TV series Hawaiian Eye. Though actually filmed at WB studios in Burbank, California, the show featured private detectives based at Kaiser's Hilton Hawaiian Village. (The Hilton Hawaiian Village was featured in Hawaii 5-0 with many scenes filmed at the resort.) Kaiser eventually bought and built a chain of radio and television stations which became known as Kaiser Broadcasting. Some call signs included his initials "HK", beginning in 1957 in Honolulu with KHVH-TV 13 and KHVH AM 1040.

== Personal life ==
Kaiser met his future wife, Bess Fosburgh, the daughter of a Virginia lumberman, when she came into his photographic shop in Lake Placid, New York, to buy film. Fosburgh's father demanded that Kaiser show that he was financially stable before he would consent to their marriage. Kaiser became a top salesman at a hardware company in Spokane, Washington, returning ten months later with enough money to placate his future father-in-law. They married on April 8, 1907, and had two children, Edgar Kaiser, Sr. and Henry Kaiser, Jr.

Fosburgh died on March 14, 1951. Kaiser married her nurse Alyce Chester (reportedly with his wife's blessing) on April 10, 1951. He adopted her son, who as Michael Kaiser, attended Lafayette Public Vallecito School. Kaiser moved his family to Hawaii in 1955.

On August 24, 1967, Kaiser died at age 85 in Honolulu. He is interred in Mountain View Cemetery in the Main Mausoleum, in Oakland, California.

He was outlived by his second wife, Alyce Chester Kaiser, who inherited half his fortune, and the other half went to "the Henry J. Kaiser Family Foundation, which was created to support the Kaiser medical program." His elder son, Edgar, who had been president of the Kaiser Industries Corporation since 1956, was substantially wealthy even though it was a fraction of his father's.

One of Kaiser's grandsons, Edgar Kaiser Jr., became president of Kaiser Steel from 1981 to 1984, and briefly owned the Denver Broncos professional football franchise. Another grandson, Henry, is an Antarctic diver and experimental guitarist.

== Legacy ==
Kaiser Industries was dissolved in the late 1970s. Koppers acquired Kaiser Sand & Gravel. Raymond International of Houston acquired Kaiser Engineers, and Kaiser Broadcasting was sold to Field Communications. Kaiser Aerospace & Electronics was sold to its managers. Kaiser Aluminum, Kaiser Cement, and Kaiser Steel remained as independent companies. Hanson Cement acquired Kaiser Cement for $200 million in 1986.

Kaiser was involved in building civic centers, roads, and schools. He was part of the consortium that constructed the Hoover Dam and Grand Coulee Dam. Kaiser is also noted for advancing medicine with the development and construction of hospitals, medical centers and medical schools. The mining town of Eagle Mountain, California, built as part of the West Coast's first integrated mining/processing operation, and linked by rail to his mill in Fontana, California, was an early user of Kaiser Permanente, the first health maintenance organization.

A class of 18 United States Navy fleet replenishment oilers built in the 1980s and 1990s is named the Henry J. Kaiser class. Its lead unit, USNS Henry J. Kaiser, the first U.S. Navy ship named for Kaiser, entered service with the Military Sealift Command on December 19, 1986.

In 1990, Kaiser was made a member of the Labor Hall of Fame of the U.S. Department of Labor in Washington, D.C., supported by the Friends of the Department of Labor.

On December 1, 2009, Governor Arnold Schwarzenegger and First Lady Maria Shriver inducted Kaiser posthumously into the California Hall of Fame in the California Museum, Sacramento, California.

== See also ==
- KaiserAir, an airline and charter company divested from Kaiser Steel
