= Gerald Phipps =

American sports executive (1915–1993)

Gerald H. Phipps (March 4, 1915 – August 6, 1993) was a businessman and sports executive. He was president of Gerald H. Phipps, Inc., a construction company and owner of the Denver Broncos American football club from 1961 to 1981.

== Early life ==
Gerald Phipps was born on March 4, 1915, in Denver, Colorado. He was the son of Lawrence Phipps, who would serve as a senator for Colorado from 1919 to 1931. He was educated in various schools as a child that ranged from Washington, D.C., to California. He studied at Williams College in Williamstown, Massachusetts, where he graduated in 1936 with a bachelor's degree with a major in English literature. Later that year, he began work at the Denver and Rio Grande Western Railroad, working as a clerk in its transportation department. He later worked as a secretary to the superintendent of transportation, a special apprentice, and later the traffic department. World War II brought him into working for the Naval Reserve. His knowledge of transportation led to him being given a commission in the Navy through the Bureau of Ordinance, which mainly dealt with him handling correspondence. He later did work with his uncle Platte Rogers at his construction company in Pueblo, Colorado, which dealt with building construction, both heavy and highway. Phipps was asked to be president of the Denver division, which paid off into purchasing the division years later. When his uncle retired and closed every operation in the company but the aforementioned Denver office, Phipps was inspired to expand to the Pikes Peak Region for what became Gerald H. Phipps General Contractors in 1952, taking the lessons of his father to heart in wanting to put people to work for projects that would help the community.

== Sports ownership ==
In 1961, a syndicate was formed by Calvin Kunz to help buy Rocky Mountain Empire Sports, which operated the expansion Denver Broncos, who were created by founder Bob Howsam. They bought it for less than $1 million. Gerald and Allan Phipps were part of the syndicate, with Gerald being chairman of the board; the Phipps brothers held 42% of the stock. Phipps was chairman of the National Football League Finance Committee from 1970 to 1981. Kunz served as team president. In 1965, the Broncos were close to moving out of Denver, spurred by a lack of ticket sales (7,996 season tickets were sold the prior year). Kunz was seen talking with Barron Hilton (owner of the San Diego Chargers) about moving the team in a January meeting of American Football League executives. Various cities were interested in the team from Chicago to Philadelphia to Atlanta. Gerald Phipps was later approached by Sonny Werblin of the New York Jets and Ralph Wilson of the Buffalo Bills to move for the benefit of the league. However, the Phipps brothers instead made an offer to Kunz and the rest of the trust in February 1965 with a set deadline. Before the deadline, Phipps was approached with a deal to sell to Atlanta (represented by J. Leonard Reinsch), but he declined. He was cited as saying that if the community had the "right kind of operation", they would support the team.

Phipps then approached Kunz and the voting trust to offer to buy the share. They came to an agreement in which they would buy it with a down payment of $250,000 and an offer of $1.25 million to be paid by June 1. The announcement on February 16 that the Phipps family had over 90% of the team led to public fanfare that saw season tickets sales double from the prior year. In 1967, Phipps and the team tried pushing a bond issue to voters of the area to help increase the size of Bears Stadium (renamed to Mile High Stadium in 1968) from 34,000 to 50,000 to be in line with the stipulation set out by the AFL to have a stadium of 50,000 seats. Supposedly, if the bond issue failed, the team would have moved to Birmingham, Alabama. The bond did fail, but a civic group called "The Doers" helped raise $1.8 million to buy the stadium from the Phipps brothers and then deed it over to the City and County of Denver, which meant that true revenue bonds could be issue by city government to expand the stadium. However, the bonds were still not paid off by 1974 by revenues of the stadium, which needed further expansion; a general obligation bond proposal had to be put up and passed by the Denver voters, which in fact passed.

During Phipps's tenure as owner, the Broncos earned their first trip to the Super Bowl (in 1978) participating in Super Bowl XII and saw a significant rise in Denver Broncos popularity, called "Broncomania". In 1985, Phipps became the first non-player to be inducted into the Broncos Ring of Fame. He sold the Broncos in February 1981 to Edgar Kaiser, Jr for $40 million.

He is also a member of the Colorado Sports Hall of Fame. Phipps was also the owner of the Denver Bears minor league baseball team alongside owner the stadium that housed both the Bears and Broncos. He was a director of Rocky Mountain Empire Sports, which owned the Denver Bears minor league baseball team from 1947 to 1984. Gerald served as board chairman while Allen served as president.

Gerald Phipps graduated with a BA in English from Williams College. He and his brother Allan were inducted into the Colorado Business Hall of Fame.

== Personal life ==
Phipps married Janet Alice Smith in 1937, and they had three children, Sandra Dennehy, Karen Sass, and Marta Talman. He also had eight grand children. Phipps died on August 6, 1993, of cancer at the age of 78.
