= Pat Bowlen =

American football executive (1944–2019)

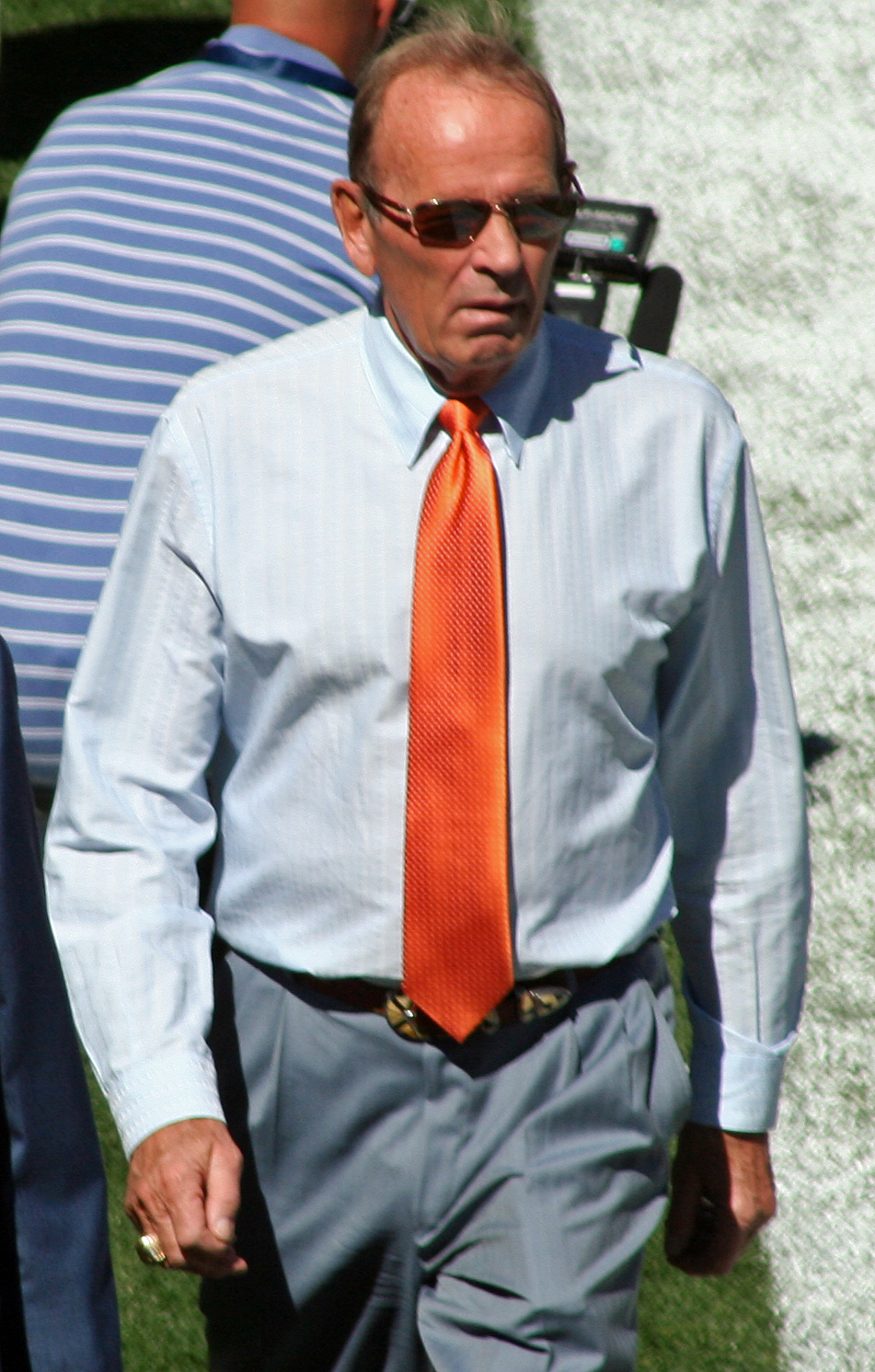
- Bowlen in Denver in 2010

Personal information
- Born: February 18, 1944; Prairie du Chien, Wisconsin, U.S.
- Died: June 13, 2019 (aged 75); Englewood, Colorado, U.S.

Career information
- High school: Campion Jesuit (Prairie du Chien, Wisconsin)
- College: Oklahoma

Career history
- Denver Broncos (1984–2014) Principal owner & chief executive officer; Denver Broncos (2014–2019) Principal owner; Denver Outlaws (2006–2019) Principal owner; Colorado Crush (2003–2008) Minority owner

Awards and highlights
- 3× Super Bowl champion (XXXII, XXXIII, 50); ArenaBowl champion (XIX); 3× Steinfeld Cup champion (2014, 2016, 2018); 3× Leader Post Trophy champion (1962, 1963, 1964); Denver Broncos Ring of Fame
- Pro Football Hall of Fame

Patrick Dennis Bowlen (February 18, 1944 – June 13, 2019) was an American lawyer, executive and the majority owner of the Denver Broncos of the National Football League (NFL), winning three Super Bowls. He was inducted in the Pro Football Hall of Fame for the class of 2019. Bowlen owned other professional sports franchises in the Colorado region. Bowlen served as the Broncos CEO from 1984 until July 2014, when he stepped down as Broncos' CEO due to the onset and progression of Alzheimer's disease.

== Early life ==
Bowlen was born in Prairie du Chien, Wisconsin to American mother Arvella (née Woods) and Canadian father Paul Dennis Bowlen, who became a millionaire in the Canadian oil business, founding Regent Drilling as a wildcatter. The oil company is now owned by his brother John. Bowlen was Catholic and spent his childhood in Alberta. He then attended Campion High School, a Catholic Jesuit boarding school in his native Wisconsin. Bowlen later earned degrees in business (1965) and law (1968) from the University of Oklahoma. During his time at Oklahoma he played for the Oklahoma Sooners freshman football team as a wide receiver, as well as for the Edmonton Huskies junior football team, where he was part of three Canadian Junior Football League Championship teams from 1962 to 1964.

The younger Bowlen became wealthier by becoming a successful lawyer in Edmonton, Alberta. Bowlen also worked as an executive for his father's company and as a real estate developer and had major investments in the mining industry. During his business career in Edmonton his construction company, Batoni-Bowlen Enterprises, built the Northlands Coliseum, which would become home to the WHA/NHL's Edmonton Oilers for 42 years.

Bowlen was an initiated member of the Pi Kappa Alpha International Fraternity. Bowlen was initiated by the University of Oklahoma, Beta Omicron chapter in 1963. Bowlen received bar admission in 1969 and was a member of the Law Society of Alberta and the Canadian Bar Association.

== Denver Broncos ownership ==
Bowlen bought a majority interest in the Denver Broncos of the National Football League in March 1984 from Vancouver industrialist Edgar Kaiser Jr. The purchase price was said to be $70 million, making the Broncos the highest-priced franchise in the league at the time.

From 1999 to 2008, Bowlen and the Broncos were involved in several legal battles against former owner Edgar Kaiser Jr. In 1998, Bowlen agreed to sell retired football legend John Elway a share in the team. When Bowlen let the existence of the offer slip out to Kaiser while both were at the 1999 Bohemian Grove, Kaiser sued, claiming a breach of contract. Kaiser asserted that he had the right of first refusal if any deal was made involving franchise ownership. In 2004, a jury ruled in favor of Kaiser and a federal judge decreed that Kaiser was entitled to purchase back 10% of the Broncos using the identical purchase terms offered to Elway. Bowlen appealed the original verdict that ruled in favor of Kaiser and won in 2008, as the appellate court ruled that the structure of the Bowlen-Elway deal did not violate the original right of first refusal agreement.

On December 30, 2008, Broncos head coach and vice president of football operations Mike Shanahan was fired by Bowlen after a 14-year tenure as the head coach. Bowlen stated he wanted his team to go in a different direction. Bowlen searched for a new head coach over a two-week period and eventually chose Josh McDaniels, who at the time was the offensive coordinator of the New England Patriots. Subsequently, after a losing streak in the 2010 season, McDaniels was fired as head coach of the Broncos. On February 12, 2009, Bowlen appointed Brian Xanders as the team's sole general manager and fired Jim and Jeff Goodman.

Within two weeks of the end of the 2010–11 regular season, Bowlen and the Broncos had hired former Carolina Panthers' coach John Fox to be their new head coach. Although Bowlen had discussions with Fox before the hiring, new front-office executive John Elway was mostly responsible for the hiring. By late 2009, rumors had begun to emerge that Bowlen had stepped out of the spotlight because of short-term memory loss. He told The Denver Post columnist Woody Paige that his memory wasn't what it used to be and that he couldn't recall details of the Broncos back-to-back Super Bowl titles in the late 1990s. Starting in 2010, Bowlen no longer played a major role in the Broncos' decision making, and Executive VP John Elway and President Joe Ellis assumed control. On July 23, 2014, due to complications with Alzheimer's disease, he officially relinquished control of the team to Joe Ellis.

On November 1, 2015, Bowlen was inducted into the Broncos' Ring of Fame, earning him a bronze plaque that stands on the south side of Empower Field at Mile High. Later that season, the Broncos would win Super Bowl 50, their third Super Bowl championship. When Elway, now the general manager for the team, received the Lombardi Trophy, he held it in the air and honored the Alzheimer-stricken Bowlen by exclaiming "this one's for Pat!" Bowlen had saluted Elway in the same fashion by saying "this one's for John!" after the Broncos won their first championship in Super Bowl XXXII eighteen years earlier.

After Bowlen acquired the team in 1984, the Broncos briefly held the highest winning percentage of any franchise in the National Football League (334 wins, 212 losses, and 1 tie, for a .612 winning percentage), passing the San Francisco 49ers after the 2015 season. At the time of Bowlen's death, the New England Patriots had surpassed that figure.

== Colorado Crush ownership ==
Besides being owner and CEO of the Broncos, Bowlen was also part-owner of the Arena Football League's Colorado Crush. He shared ownership with Denver-based sports mogul Stan Kroenke and legendary Broncos quarterback John Elway. The Crush entered the AFL as an expansion franchise in 2003. After going through a 2–14 season in 2003, the team became a perennial playoff contender and one of the league's top franchises. The Crush won the Arena Football League Championship in 2005.

== Denver Outlaws ownership ==
In 2006, Major League Lacrosse decided to expand adding the Denver Outlaws to its league of teams. The Denver Outlaws have been the most winning franchise that Bowlen has ever owned, boasting a regular-season win percentage of 69.0% since their creation. The Outlaws have been to the playoffs every year of their existence except one (2015) and advanced to the championship game eight times (2006, 2008, 2009, 2012, 2014, 2016, 2017, and 2018), winning the championship in 2014, 2016, and 2018.

== Philanthropy ==
Bowlen was a member of the University of Denver Board of Trustees and contributed to the funding of the Pat Bowlen Athletic Training Center located on the school's campus. He also contributed significantly to the local Denver Boys & Girls Club chapters.

== Awards and honors ==
- Inducted to the Pro Football Hall of Fame (class of 2019)
- Three-time Super Bowl champion (as owner of the Denver Broncos)
- ArenaBowl XIX champion (as part owner of the Colorado Crush)
- Three-time Steinfeld Cup champion (as owner of the Denver Outlaws)
- Broncos Ring of Fame (class of 2015)
- Colorado Business Hall of Fame (class of 2015)

== Death ==
On June 13, 2019, Bowlen died of a pulmonary embolism. Under terms set prior to Bowlen's death, Joe Ellis led a three-person trust representing his estate. Bowlen's intent was for his seven children to inherit the franchise, though he did not specify which of them would have first right.

Sporting positions
Preceded by Edgar Kaiser Jr.	Denver Broncos principal owner 1984–2019	Succeeded by Pat Bowlen's Trust
