= Edgar Kaiser Sr. =

American industrialist (1908–1981)

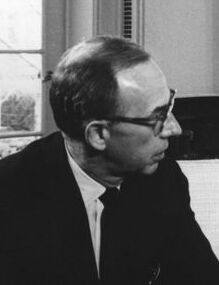
- Born: Edgar Fosburgh Kaiser; July 29, 1908; Seattle, Washington, U.S.
- Died: December 7, 1981 (aged 73); Oakland, California, U.S.
- Education: University of California, Berkeley
- Spouses: Susan Mead; Nina McCormick
- Children: 6 (including Edgar) with Mead
- Relatives: Henry J. Kaiser (Father)
- Awards

Edgar Fosburgh Kaiser Sr. (July 29, 1908 – December 7, 1981) was an American industrialist, who was Chairman of Kaiser Aluminum and Chemical Corporation, the Kaiser Cement Corporation and the Kaiser Steel Corporation.

Kaiser was born in Seattle and spent his youth growing up in construction camps of his father Henry J. Kaiser. He gained experience fulfilling junior roles in the associated construction sites, but opted to study economics when he attended the University of California, Berkeley. In 1930 he left in his final year without graduating, but with his father's approval. He went to work on pipeline construction. Then in 1932 he moved on to work on the Boulder Dam. Here he started as a shovel foreman before being promoted to superintendent of canyon excavation. He then moved on to Bonneville Dam construction.

In 1941 Kaiser was appointed vice-president and general manager of Kaiser Shipyards, responsible for building ships from prefabricated parts during the Second World War as part of the Emergency Shipbuilding program. In 1947, he was appointed general manager of his father's auto manufacturer, the Kaiser-Frazer Corporation.

Kaiser received the Award of Excellence from Engineering News-Record for his service under President Lyndon Johnson on the Committee on Urban Housing. His work on this committee to increase the availability of housing for low- and moderate-income families earned him the Medal of Freedom. He died in Oakland, California, on December 7, 1981.
