= J. Leonard Reinsch =

American radio executive

Personal details
- Born: June 28, 1908 Streator, Illinois, U.S.
- Died: May 9, 1991 (aged 82) Baltimore, Maryland, U.S.

James Leonard Reinsch (June 28, 1908 – May 9, 1991) (Note: According to one source, his name was pronounced as "wrench") was a broadcasting executive. He was president and CEO of Cox Communications. Behind the scenes, he gave advice to four Presidents. He assisted the White House Press Secretary office in 1945, during the transition from President Franklin D. Roosevelt to President Harry Truman and advised Winston Churchill on his 1946 "Iron Curtain" speech.

== Career ==
Reinsch was born in Streator, Illinois in 1908. He majored in Advertising at Northwestern University, where he won the D.F. Keller prize for this thesis. He took over the development of what was then WHIO for James M. Cox. Reinsch was sent to Atlanta, in 1939, when Cox purchased the Atlanta Journal and Georgian and the radio stations. He was put in charge of WSB radio. In 1942 he was put in charge of the three radio stations; WIOD Miami, WSB Atlanta, WHIO in Dayton. Reinsch was called on by Cox to assist in communications at the White House during the transition from the Roosevelt to Truman administrations in 1946.

In the 1960 presidential campaign, he suggested that the two opponents stand for the hour-long debate, knowing that Richard Nixon had injured a knee when he struck it on a car door. To Mr. Reinsch's surprise, Nixon agreed. He also served as a key advisor to Presidents Franklin Roosevelt and Harry Truman.

Reinsch narrowly avoided being the first owner of an Atlanta football team. In the summer of 1965, he reached a tenantive deal to purchase the Denver Broncos from the Phipps family and move them to Atlanta. However, in the time between the deal (where he left for New Zealand right after due to having to travel for his wife's surgery) and June 30, 1965, the National Football League (as led by Pete Rozelle) announced that Rankin Smith, among a few others, would be part of an expansion team in Atlanta that would begin play in 1966.

In 1973, Reinsch retired from Cox Broadcasting. In March of that same year, Reinsch was presented the coveted Gold Medal award from the International Radio and Television Society. He was a member of the Peabody Awards Board of Jurors from 1979 to 1985.

Reinsch died on May 9, 1991 of heart failure at Johns Hopkins Hospital in Baltimore.[. In September 2003, the Library of American Broadcasting named Reinsch as one of the "First Fifty Giants of Broadcasting".
