= Edgar Kaiser Jr. =

American-Canadian financier (1942-2012)

- Born: Edgar Fosburgh Kaiser Jr. July 5, 1942; Portland, Oregon, U.S.
- Died: January 11, 2012 (aged 69); Toronto, Ontario, Canada
- Citizenship: United States, Canada
- Occupation: Financier
- Parent: Edgar Kaiser Sr.
- Relatives: Henry J. Kaiser (grandfather); Henry Kaiser (cousin)

Edgar Fosburgh Kaiser Jr. (July 5, 1942 – January 11, 2012) was an American-Canadian financier and a former owner of the Denver Broncos American football team.

== Early life and education ==
Kaiser was born in Portland, Oregon, on July 5, 1942, and was the grandson of shipbuilding industrialist Henry J. Kaiser.

He earned a BA degree from Stanford University and an MBA degree from Harvard University.

== Career ==
Kaiser held several corporate positions during his life, including chief executive officer of Vancouver-based Kaiser Resources Ltd, the family holding company. Kaiser Resources' coal assets were sold to British Columbia Resources Investment Corporation and Ashland Oil Canada to Dome Petroleum.

Kaiser was chairman and CEO of the Bank of British Columbia from 1984 until the bank's 1986 demise. He also was on the board of directors of several large Canadian companies.

Kaiser was a White House Fellow and as a Special Assistant to President Lyndon B. Johnson, President Richard M. Nixon, and as a Special Assistant to U.S. Secretary of the Interior Walter J. Hickel.

== Denver Broncos ==
Kaiser purchased the Broncos from the Gerald Phipps family in February 1981 for $29 million. He sold his 60.8% share of the Broncos to Pat Bowlen in March 1984 for $78 million. He then sued Bowlen for violating the original sales’ agreement, which he contended granted him right of first purchase of any sale of shares in the team. Kaiser claimed Bowlen violated this agreement by offering former Broncos quarterback John Elway a 10% stake of the company that holds ownership of the team. In 2004, a jury ruled in favor of Kaiser, and a federal judge decreed that Kaiser was entitled to purchase back 10% of the Broncos using the identical purchase terms offered to Elway. Bowlen appealed the original verdict that ruled in favor of Kaiser and won the appeal, as the appellate court ruled that the structure of the Bowlen-Elway deal did not violate the original agreement.

== The Kaiser Foundation ==
In 1985, Edgar Kaiser Jr. established the Kaiser Foundation (unrelated to the American Henry J. Kaiser Family Foundation). It is a North Vancouver, British Columbia-based organization established as a Canadian national organization, operated separately from other ventures of the Kaiser family, with the goal of promoting the understanding and importance of mental health and addictions as health issues. It has also established the Kaiser Mental Health and Addictions Awareness Foundation and the Aboriginal Peoples' Health Initiative.

== Personal life ==
He became a Canadian citizen in 1980.

He died on January 11, 2012.
