= Keanu Neal =

American football player (born 1995)

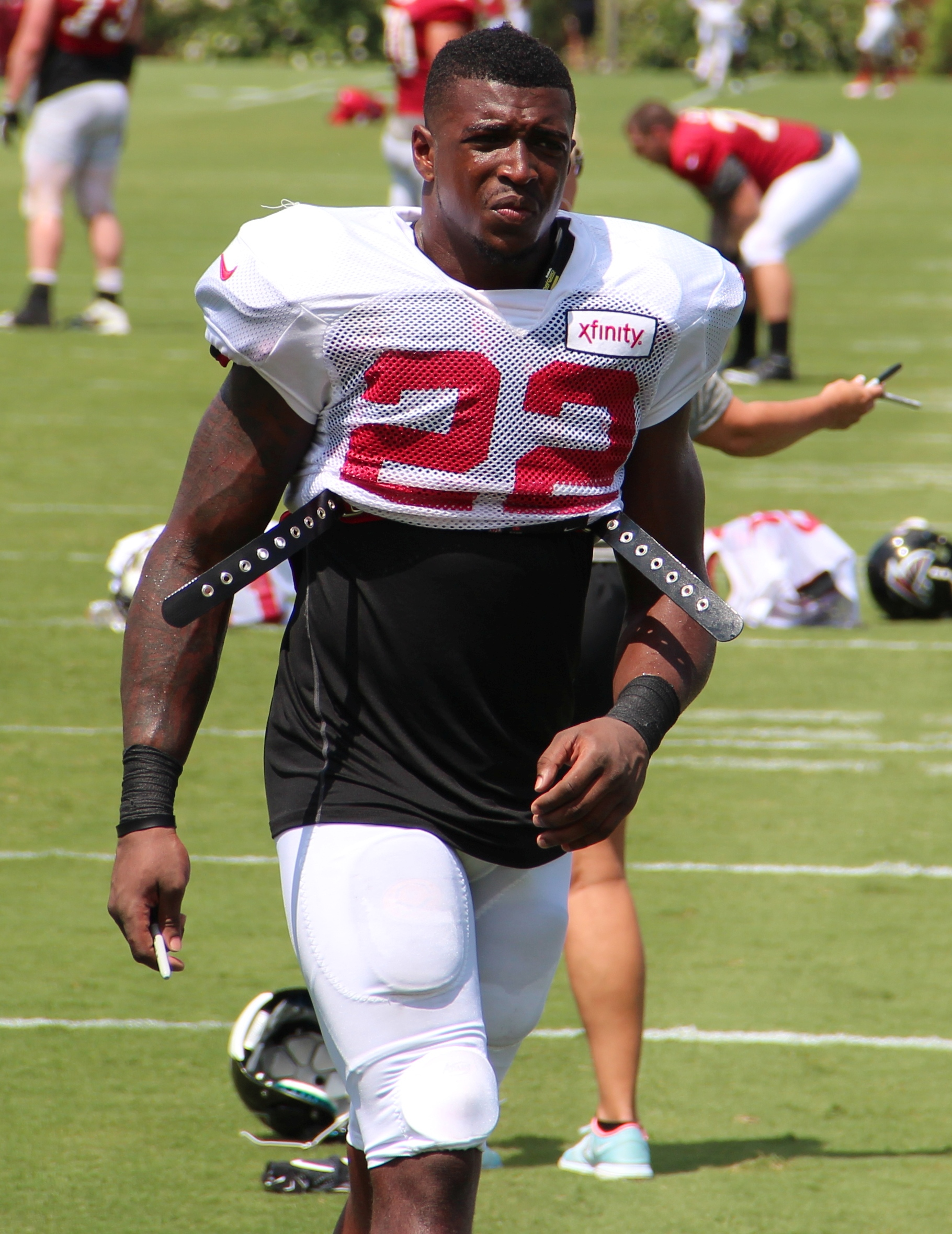
- Neal with the Atlanta Falcons in 2016

No. 22, 42, 31
- Position: Safety

Personal information
- Born: July 26, 1995 (age 31); Webster, Florida, U.S.
- Listed height: 6 ft 0 in (1.83 m)
- Listed weight: 211 lb (96 kg)

Career information
- High school: South Sumter (Bushnell, Florida)
- College: Florida (2013–2015)
- NFL draft: 2016: 1st round, 17th overall pick

Career history
- Atlanta Falcons (2016–2020); Dallas Cowboys (2021); Tampa Bay Buccaneers (2022); Pittsburgh Steelers (2023)

Awards and highlights
- Pro Bowl (2017); PFWA All-Rookie Team (2016)

Career NFL statistics
- Total tackles: 523
- Sacks: 2.5
- Forced fumbles: 8
- Fumble recoveries: 5
- Pass deflections: 22
- Interceptions: 4
- Stats at Pro Football Reference

Keanu Neal (born July 26, 1995) is an American former professional football player who was a safety for eight seasons in the National Football League (NFL), primarily with the Atlanta Falcons. He played college football for the Florida Gators and was selected by the Atlanta Falcons with the 17th overall pick in the 2016 NFL draft.

== Early life ==
Neal attended South Sumter High School in Bushnell, Florida. He began playing as a linebacker before being switched to safety. As a junior, he tallied 151 tackles, 4 interceptions, one of which he returned 20 yards for a touchdown, as well as four forced fumbles, five pass deflections and one offensive touchdown as a goal-line fullback. He received All-conference and All-state honors.

As a senior, he had over 70 tackles and four interceptions. He committed to the University of Florida to play college football under head coach Will Muschamp.

== College career ==
As a true freshman in 2013, he appeared in all 12 games as a reserve player, focusing mostly on special teams. He collected five special teams tackles.

As a sophomore in 2014, he played in 10 games with eight starts at safety. He was injured in the fifth game against the University of Georgia and was forced to miss the next 2 contests. He posted 45 tackles and three interceptions. He had 10 tackles, one forced fumble, and one fumble recovery with a 45-yard return against the University of Alabama. He made 10 tackles against the University of Missouri. He had 8 tackles against East Carolina University.

As a junior in 2015, he started 11 of 12 games at safety under new head coach Jim McElwain. He missed the first 2 contests of the season with an injury. He recorded 96 tackles (third on the team), 51 solo tackles (led the team), 3.5 tackles for loss, one interception and 2 sacks. He has 14 tackles against the University of Tennessee and Louisiana State University. He declared for the 2016 NFL draft at the end of the season.

== Professional career ==
Pre-draft measurables
Height	Weight	Arm length	Hand span	40-yard dash	10-yard split	20-yard split	20-yard shuttle	Three-cone drill	Vertical jump	Broad jump	Bench press
6 ft 0 1/2 in (1.84 m)	211 lb (96 kg)	32 3/4 in (0.83 m)	10 5/8 in (0.27 m)	4.62 s	1.62 s	2.69 s	4.20 s	7.09 s	38 in (0.97 m)	11 ft 0 in (3.35 m)	17 reps
All values from NFL Combine/Pro Day

=== Atlanta Falcons ===
==== 2016 season ====
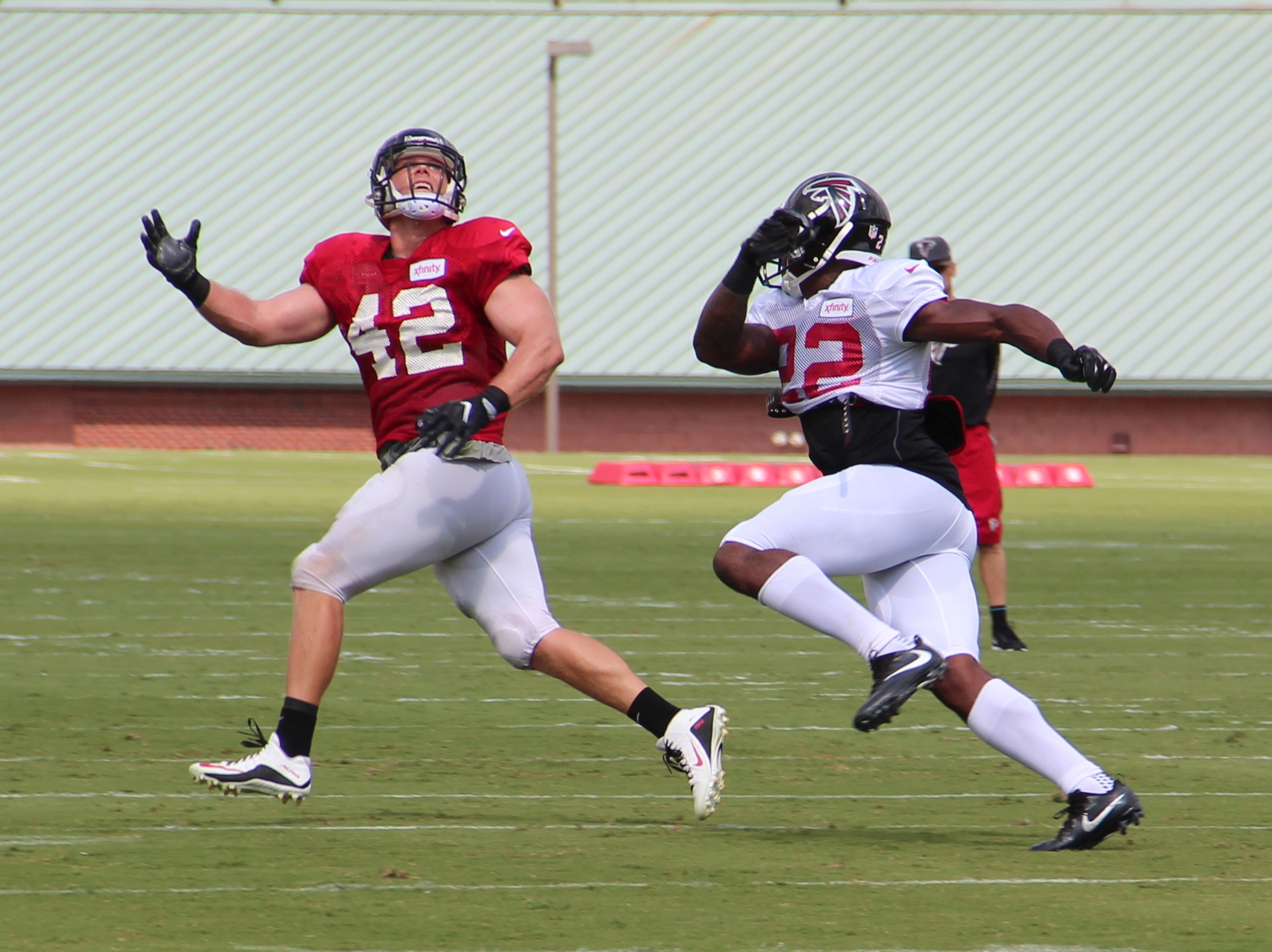
Neal (right) covering Patrick DiMarco at Falcons training camp in 2016

Neal was selected by the Atlanta Falcons in the first round (17th overall) of the 2016 NFL draft. He was the second safety selected in 2016 behind West Virginia's Karl Joseph (12th overall). On May 4, 2016, the Falcons signed Neal to a fully guaranteed four-year, $10.73 million contract that includes a signing bonus of $6 million.

Throughout training camp, he competed for the job as the starting strong safety after it was left vacant due to the Falcons opting not to re-sign William Moore. He competed for the job against Kemal Ishmael and Charles Godfrey. On August 25, 2016, Neal recorded five solo tackles before leaving the Falcons' 17–6 loss at the Miami Dolphins in the second quarter after sustaining an injury. Neal sustained a knee injury after receiving a stiff arm while attempting to tackle Dolphins' running back Arian Foster during a 17-yard reception. The injury required surgery and sidelined him for the first two regular season games. Head coach Dan Quinn named Neal the starting strong safety to begin the regular season, alongside free safety Ricardo Allen.

He made his professional regular season debut and first career start in the Falcons' Week 3 matchup at the New Orleans Saints and recorded four combined tackles and a pass deflection during their 45–32 victory. He made his first career tackle on the Saints' first offensive snap and tackled running back Mark Ingram II after a three-yard gain. On October 23, 2016, Neal recorded a season-high 11 combined tackles (five solo) in and a pass deflection during a 26–24 loss at the Seattle Seahawks. In Week 10, he made a season-high nine solo tackles and broke up a pass in the Falcons' 24–15 loss at the Philadelphia Eagles. On December 18, 2016, Neal tied his season-high with 11 combined tackles (five solo) and had a season-high two pass deflections during their 41–13 victory against the San Francisco 49ers. He finished his rookie season in 2016 with 105 total tackles (72 solo), nine passes defended, five forced fumbles, and one fumble recovery in 14 games and 14 starts. He was named to the PFWA All-Rookie Team.

The Atlanta Falcons finished first in the National Football Conference (NFC) South with an 11–5 record, while also clinching the number 2 seed in the NFC, and a first round bye in the playoffs. On January 13, 2017, Neal started his first career playoff game and led both teams with 11 combined tackles (ten solo) during the Falcons' 36–20 win against the Seattle Seahawks in the NFC Divisional Round. The following week, the Falcons defeated the Green Bay Packers 44–21 in the NFC Championship. On February 6, 2017, Neal collected 13 combined tackles (nine solo) during the Falcons' 34–28 overtime loss to the New England Patriots in Super Bowl LI. Defensive coordinator Richard Smith was fired after the Falcons' defense experienced a fourth quarter collapse and let the Patriots come back from a 19-point deficit in the fourth quarter.

==== 2017 season ====
New Falcons' defensive coordinator Marquand Manuel opted to retain Neal and Allen as the starting safety duo to begin the regular season. In Week 7, Neal recorded a season-high ten combined tackles (six solo) and deflected a pass during a 23–7 loss at the Patriots. In Week 9, he collected eight combined tackles and forced two fumbles in Atlanta's 20–17 loss at the Carolina Panthers. On December 24, 2016, he tied his season-high with ten combined tackles (eight solo) and a pass deflection in the Falcons' 23–13 loss at the Saints. The following week, Neal made five combined tackles, deflected a pass, and made his first career interception off a pass by quarterback Cam Newton during a 22–10 victory against the Panthers.

He finished the 2017 season with 116 combined tackles (83 solo), six pass deflections, three forced fumbles, and an interception in 16 games and 16 starts. He finished second in tackles for the Falcons, behind linebacker Deion Jones, and finished second in tackles among safeties behind Reshad Jones.

The Falcons finished third in the NFC South with a 10–6 record. They received a wild card spot, but were eliminated from the playoffs after being defeated 15–10 by the eventual Super Bowl LII Champions the Eagles in the NFC Divisional Round. Neal recorded six combined tackles during their loss and had 14 combined total in both playoff games. On January 22, 2018, Neal was named to his first Pro Bowl as a replacement for safety Malcolm Jenkins due to his participation in Super Bowl LII with the Eagles.

==== 2018 season ====
During the season opener against the Eagles, Neal left the game with a knee injury. He came back to the game only to leave the game again on a non-contact play. The next day, it was confirmed that Neal tore his ACL, and would miss the remainder of the season. He was placed on injured reserve on September 10, 2018.

==== 2019 season ====
On April 24, 2019, the Falcons exercised the fifth-year option on Neal's contract. In third preseason game against the Washington Redskins, Neal dealt an illegal helmet-to-helmet hit against tight end Jordan Reed that ended Reed's season before it began. Neal was fined $28,075 by the NFL for his hit on Reed. Against the Indianapolis Colts in Week 3, Neal suffered a torn Achilles tendon just before halftime, ending his season prematurely for the second year in a row. He was placed on injured reserve on September 24, 2019.

==== 2020 season ====
In Week 7 against the Detroit Lions, Neal led the team with 11 tackles (10 solo) and sacked Matthew Stafford once during the 23–22 loss. In Week 16 against the Kansas City Chiefs, Neal recorded his first interception of the season off a pass thrown by wide receiver Sammy Watkins on a trick play during the 17–14 loss.

=== Dallas Cowboys ===
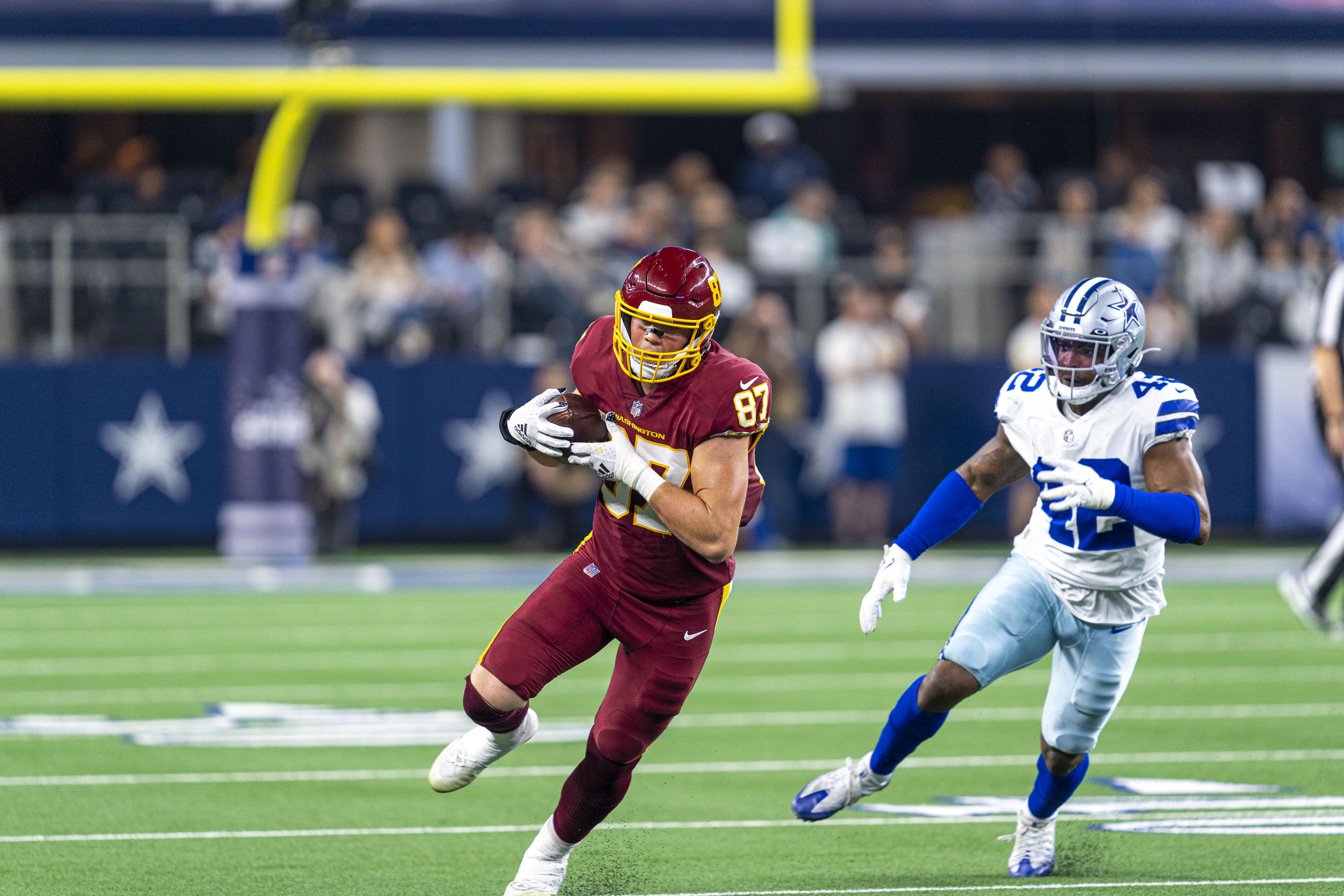
Neal (right) playing for the Cowboys in 2021.

On April 14, 2021, Neal signed a one-year, $5 million contract with the Dallas Cowboys, reuniting with defensive coordinator Dan Quinn, who was his head coach with the Falcons. He was switched to weakside linebacker during organized team activities in May. He appeared in 14 games with 5 starts, while missing 3 contests on the Reserve/COVID-19 list. He registered 79 tackles (tied for third on the team), one sack and 2 special teams tackles. He had 13 tackles against the Las Vegas Raiders.

=== Tampa Bay Buccaneers ===
On April 6, 2022, Neal signed a one-year, $1.272 million contract with the Tampa Bay Buccaneers, switching back to a more traditional role at strong safety. He appeared in 17 games with 8 starts, after being thrust into action following Logan Ryan's foot injury in Week Four. He posted 63 tackles (2 for loss), a half sack, one interception and 4 passes defensed.

=== Pittsburgh Steelers ===
On April 4, 2023, Neal signed with the Pittsburgh Steelers. On November 18, the Steelers placed him on injured reserve.

On March 7, 2024, the Steelers released Neal after a failed physical.

=== Retirement ===
On February 23, 2025, Neal announced his retirement from the NFL after not playing the entire 2024 season.

== NFL career statistics ==
=== Regular season ===
Year	Team	Games		Tackles					Interceptions						Fumbles			
Year	Team	GP	GS	Cmb	Solo	Ast	Sck	TfL	PD	Int	Yds	Avg	Lng	TD	FF	FR	Yds	TD
2016	ATL	14	14	106	72	34	0.0	2	8	0	0	0.0	0	0	5	1	0	0
2017	ATL	16	16	116	83	33	0.0	4	6	1	19	19.0	19	0	3	2	0	0
2018	ATL	1	1	2	1	1	0.0	0	0	0	0	0.0	0	0	0	0	0	0
2019	ATL	3	3	14	11	3	0.0	0	0	0	0	0.0	0	0	0	0	0	0
2020	ATL	15	14	100	76	24	1.0	9	2	1	0	0.0	0	0	0	1	0	0
2021	DAL	14	5	72	44	28	1.0	4	0	0	0	0.0	0	0	0	0	0	0
2022	TB	17	8	63	41	22	0.5	2	4	1	0	0.0	0	0	0	0	0	0
2023	PIT	9	8	50	33	17	0.0	1	2	1	32	32.0	32	0	0	1	0	0
Career		89	69	523	361	162	2.5	22	22	4	51	12.8	32	0	8	5	0	0

=== Postseason ===
Year	Team	Games		Tackles					Interceptions						Fumbles		
Year	Team	GP	GS	Cmb	Solo	Ast	Sck	PD	Int	Yds	Avg	Lng	TD	FF	FR	Yds	TD
2016	ATL	3	3	30	24	6	0.0	0	0	0	0.0	0	0	0	0	0	0
2017	ATL	2	2	14	11	3	0.0	1	0	0	0.0	0	0	0	1	0	0
Career		5	5	44	35	9	0.0	1	0	0	0.0	0	0	0	1	0	0

== Personal life ==
Keanu Neal is named after actor Keanu Reeves. His brother, Clinton Hart, played safety in the NFL. Neal’s mentor is former Seahawks safety Kam Chancellor. Neal kept a signed Chancellor jersey in his locker to pay respect.
