= 2008 San Diego Chargers season =

NFL team 49th season

- Owner: Alex Spanos
- General manager: A. J. Smith
- Head coach: Norv Turner
- Offensive coordinator: Clarence Shelmon
- Defensive coordinator: Ted Cottrell (fired on October 28, 2008); Ron Rivera (interim)
- Home stadium: Qualcomm Stadium

Results
- Record: 8–8
- Division place: 1st AFC West
- Playoffs: Won Wild Card Playoffs (vs. Colts) 23–17 (OT); Lost Divisional Playoffs (at Steelers) 24–35
- All-Pros: 1: G Kris Dielman (2nd team)
- Pro Bowlers: 2: G Kris Dielman; TE Antonio Gates

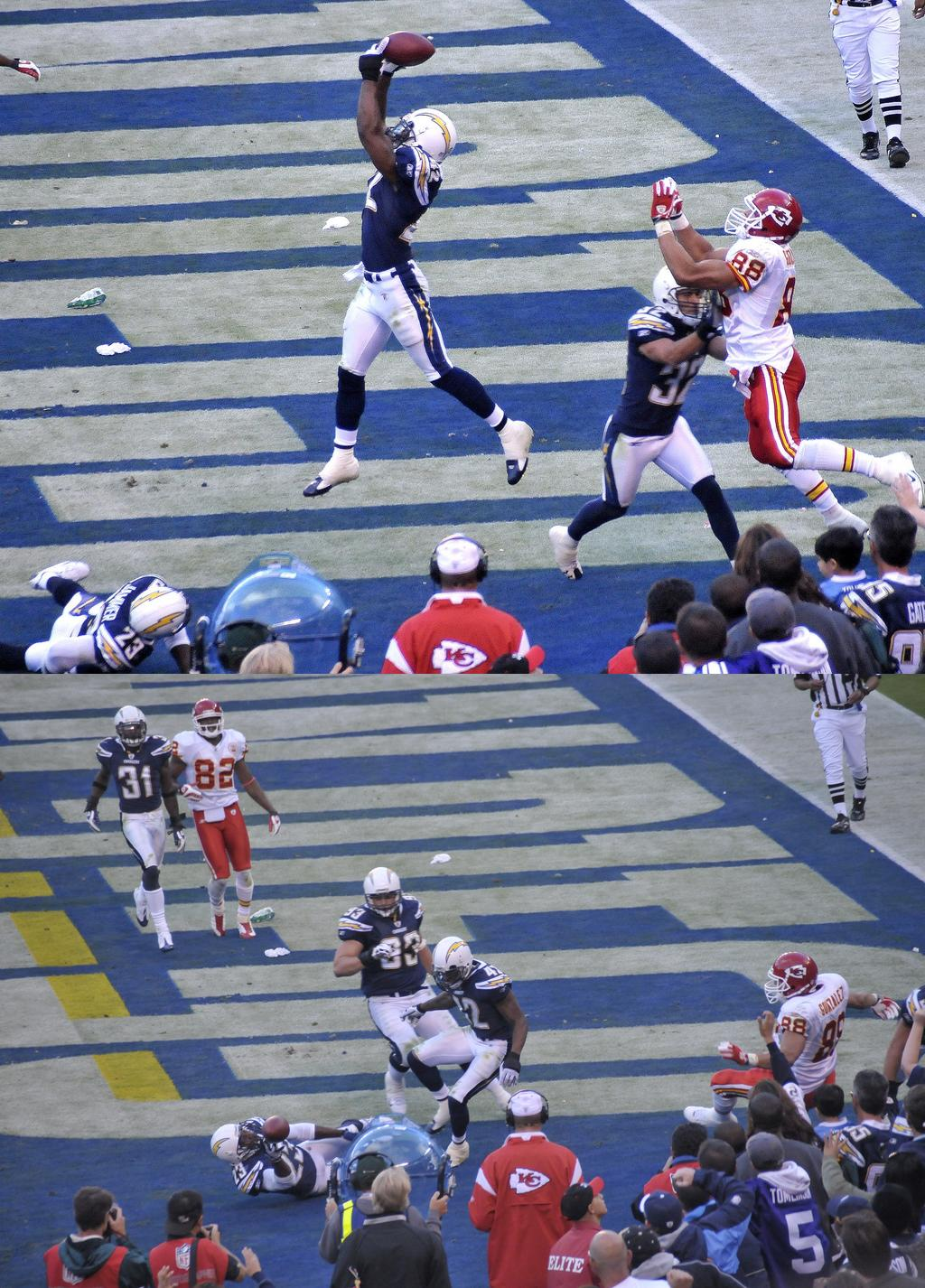
A dramatic conclusion in week 10: Clinton Hart stops the Kansas City Chiefs' last attempt at winning the game by knocking the ball into Quentin Jammer's arms

The 2008 season was the San Diego Chargers' 39th in the National Football League (NFL) and their 49th overall. While they completed the regular season with only an 8–8 record, they nonetheless captured their third consecutive AFC West championship. In the first round of the playoffs, the Chargers defeated the Indianapolis Colts 23–17. But they were eliminated the following week during their divisional round game on the road against the eventual Super Bowl champion Pittsburgh Steelers 35–24.

The Chargers became the first team to go 8–8 and win their division since the 1985 Cleveland Browns, and by winning their Wild Card playoff game against the Indianapolis Colts, became the first team in NFL history to actually go an entire season without having a winning record until after the first round of the playoffs. They also became the first team in NFL history to start a season 4–8 and make the playoffs, (Note: The 2022 Jacksonville Jaguars would become the second team to begin 4–8 and make the playoffs; however, the Jaguars played a 17-game regular season.) and the only team to do so in a 16-game schedule.

== Contract negotiations ==
- DB Clinton Hart was signed to a 5-year extension in April after being ranked 2nd on the team in Interceptions in his first full year as a starter.
- LS David Binn was signed to a 4-year extension in May. He was the only remaining member of the Chargers’ 1994 Super Bowl team.

== Notable roster additions ==
- LB Derek Smith – Signed as a free agent.
- OL L. J. Shelton – Signed as a free agent.
- RB Michael Bennett – Signed off waivers.

== Notable roster losses ==
- CB Drayton Florence – Left as a free agent. Signed with the Jacksonville Jaguars.
- RB Michael Turner – Left as a free agent. Signed with the Atlanta Falcons.
- SS Marlon McCree – Signed with the Denver Broncos.
- RT Shane Olivea – Signed with the New York Giants.
- FB Lorenzo Neal – Released. Signed with the Baltimore Ravens.
- LB Derek Smith – Released after Michael Bennett (American football) was signed.

== NFL draft ==
2008 San Diego Chargers draft
| Round | Pick | Player | Position | College | Notes |
| 1 | 27 | Antoine Cason | CB | Arizona | |
| 3 | 69 | Jacob Hester | FB | LSU | |
| 5 | 166 | Marcus Thomas | RB | UTEP | |
| 6 | 192 | DeJuan Tribble | CB | Boston College | |
| 7 | 234 | Corey Clark | OT | Texas A&M | |
Made roster † Pro Football Hall of Fame * Made at least one Pro Bowl during career

== Undrafted free agents ==
- Mike Tolbert, FB, Coastal Carolina
- Brandon Jackson, WR, North Texas
- Gary Banks, WR, Troy
- Greg Bracey, WR, Missouri
- Billy Pittman, WR, Texas
- Roy Betschart, H-back, Wyoming
- John Tereshinski, TE, Wake Forest
- Brandyn Dombrowski, G, San Diego State
- Andrew Crummey, G, Maryland
- Tyler Luellen, T, Missouri
- Keith Shologan, DT, Central Florida
- Lamar Divens, DT, Tennessee State
- Eric Bakhtiari, OLB, University of San Diego
- Josh Bell, CB, Baylor
- Stanley Franks, CB, Idaho
- Brian Bonner, S, TCU
- Billy Vinnedge, P/K, Wyoming

== Staff ==
San Diego Chargers 2008 staff
| Front office: Owner – Alex Spanos; President/CEO – Dean Spanos; Executive vice president – Michael Spanos; Executive vice president/executive officer – A. G. Spanos; Executive vice president/general manager – A. J. Smith; Executive vice president of football operations/assistant general manager – Ed McGuire; Senior executive – Randy Mueller; Director of player personnel – Jimmy Raye; Director of pro scouting – Dennis Abraham; Director of college scouting – John Spanos; Assistant director of college scouting – Mike Biehl; Head coaches: Head coach – Norv Turner; Assistant to the Head Coach – Margie Smith; Coaches Assistant/Football Analyst – Steve Gera; Offensive coaches: Offensive coordinator – Clarence Shelmon; Quarterbacks – John Ramsdell; Running backs – Ollie Wilson; Wide receivers – Charlie Joiner; Tight ends - Clancy Barone; Offensive line – Hal Hunter; Offensive line – Jack Henry | Defensive coaches: Defensive coordinator – Ted Cottrell; Defensive line – Wayne Nunnely; Inside linebackers - Ron Rivera; Outside linebackers – John Pagano; Secondary – Bill Bradley; Assistant secondary/Defensive quality control – Kevin Ross; Special teams coaches: Special teams – Steve Crosby; Strength and conditioning: Strength and conditioning – Jeff Hurd; Assistant strength and conditioning – Vernon Stephens |

== Roster ==
2008 San Diego Chargers roster
| Quarterbacks (QB): 17 Philip Rivers; 7 Billy Volek; 6 Charlie Whitehurst; Running backs (RB): 29 Michael Bennett; 22 Jacob Hester; 34 Billy Latsko FB; 43 Darren Sproles KR/PR; 35 Mike Tolbert FB; 21 LaDainian Tomlinson; Wide receivers (WR): 89 Chris Chambers; 80 Malcom Floyd; 83 Vincent Jackson; 11 Legedu Naanee; 81 Kassim Osgood; Tight ends (TE): 85 Antonio Gates; 86 Brandon Manumaleuna; 88 Kris Wilson | Offensive linemen (OL): 75 Corey Clark T; 66 Jeromey Clary T; 68 Kris Dielman G; 67 Kynan Forney G; 79 Mike Goff G; 61 Nick Hardwick C; 73 Marcus McNeill T; 63 Scott Mruczkowski G; 62 Jeremy Newberry C; 70 L. J. Shelton T; Defensive linemen (DL): 97 Ryon Bingham DE; 93 Luis Castillo DE; 74 Jacques Cesaire DE; 99 Igor Olshansky DE; 98 Ian Scott NT; 76 Jamal Williams NT | Linebackers (LB): 90 Antwan Applewhite OLB; 54 Stephen Cooper ILB; 51 Tim Dobbins ILB; 92 Marques Harris OLB; 95 Shaun Phillips OLB; 59 Brandon Siler ILB; 94 Jyles Tucker OLB; 53 Anthony Waters ILB; 57 Matt Wilhelm ILB; Defensive backs (DB): 20 Antoine Cason CB; 31 Antonio Cromartie CB; 24 Cletis Gordon CB; 28 Steve Gregory SS; 42 Clinton Hart SS; 23 Quentin Jammer CB; 27 Paul Oliver FS; 32 Eric Weddle FS; Special teams (ST): 50 David Binn LS; 10 Nate Kaeding K; 5 Mike Scifres P | Practice squad: 12 Gary Banks WR; 30 Eldra Buckley RB; 78 Andre Coleman DE; 69 Brandyn Dombrowski T; 36 Travis Key CB; 48 Grant Mason CB (IR); 91 Ogemdi Nwagbuo NT; 3 Marco Thomas WR; 29 DeJuan Tribble CB; Reserve: 87 Scott Chandler TE (IR); 84 Craig Davis WR (IR); 96 Keith Grennan DE (IR); 56 Shawne Merriman LB (IR); Rookies in italics 53 active, 5 reserve, 8 practice squad |

== Preseason ==
| Week | Date | Opponent | Result | Record | Venue | Recap |
|---|---|---|---|---|---|---|
| 1 | August 9 | Dallas Cowboys | W 31–17 | 1–0 | Qualcomm Stadium | Recap |
| 2 | August 16 | at St. Louis Rams | L 6–7 | 1–1 | Edward Jones Dome | Recap |
| 3 | August 25 | Seattle Seahawks | W 18–17 | 2–1 | Qualcomm Stadium | Recap |
| 4 | August 29 | at San Francisco 49ers | W 20–17 | 3–1 | Candlestick Park | Recap |

== Regular season ==
=== Schedule ===
In addition to their regular games with AFC West rivals, the Chargers played teams from the AFC East and NFC South as per the schedule rotation, and also played intraconference games against the Colts and the Steelers based on divisional positions from 2007.

On October 26, the Chargers had a game against the New Orleans Saints in London, England, where the Saints were the designated home team. i.e. They were playing their home game in London. This was the second NFL game played in London in as many years.

| Week | Date | Opponent | Result | Record | Venue | Recap |
|---|---|---|---|---|---|---|
| 1 | September 7 | Carolina Panthers | **L** 24–26 | 0–1 | Qualcomm Stadium | Recap |
| 2 | September 14 | at **Denver Broncos** | **L** 38–39 | 0–2 | Invesco Field | Recap |
| 3 | September 22 | New York Jets | **W** 48–29 | 1–2 | Qualcomm Stadium | Recap |
| 4 | September 28 | at **Oakland Raiders** | **W** 28–18 | 2–2 | Oakland–Alameda County Coliseum | Recap |
| 5 | October 5 | at Miami Dolphins | **L** 10–17 | 2–3 | Dolphin Stadium | Recap |
| 6 | October 12 | New England Patriots | **W** 30–10 | 3–3 | Qualcomm Stadium | Recap |
| 7 | October 19 | at Buffalo Bills | **L** 14–23 | 3–4 | Ralph Wilson Stadium | Recap |
| 8 | October 26 | at New Orleans Saints | **L** 32–37 | 3–5 | Wembley Stadium (Note: NFL overseas game in England. New Orleans is the designated home team.) | Recap |
| 9 | Bye | | | | | |
| 10 | November 9 | **Kansas City Chiefs** | **W** 20–19 | 4–5 | Qualcomm Stadium | Recap |
| 11 | November 16 | at Pittsburgh Steelers | **L** 10–11 | 4–6 | Heinz Field | Recap |
| 12 | November 23 | Indianapolis Colts | **L** 20–23 | 4–7 | Qualcomm Stadium | Recap |
| 13 | November 30 | Atlanta Falcons | **L** 16–22 | 4–8 | Qualcomm Stadium | Recap |
| 14 | December 4 | **Oakland Raiders** | **W** 34–7 | 5–8 | Qualcomm Stadium | Recap |
| 15 | December 14 | at **Kansas City Chiefs** | **W** 22–21 | 6–8 | Arrowhead Stadium | Recap |
| 16 | December 21 | at Tampa Bay Buccaneers | **W** 41–24 | 7–8 | Raymond James Stadium | Recap |
| 17 | December 28 | **Denver Broncos** | **W** 52–21 | 8–8 | Qualcomm Stadium (Note: Game time changed due to NBC's flex scheduling.) | Recap |
Note: Intra-division opponents are in **bold** text.

.

=== Game summaries ===
==== Week 1: vs. Carolina Panthers ====
Week 1: Carolina Panthers at San Diego Chargers

| Quarter | 1 | 2 | 3 | 4 | Total |
|---|---|---|---|---|---|
| **Panthers** | 0 | 9 | 7 | 10 | **26** |
| Chargers | 0 | 7 | 3 | 14 | **24** |

at Qualcomm Stadium, San Diego, California

- Date: September 7
- Game time: 1:15 p.m. PDT
- Game weather: 81 °F (27.2 °C) (Sunny)
- Game attendance: 67,115
- Referee: Walt Anderson
- TV announcers (FOX): Dick Stockton, Brian Baldinger and Laura Okmin
- Box score

Game information

**First quarter**

- No scoring plays.

**Second quarter**

- CAR – John Kasay 44-yard field goal, 12:35. Panthers 3–0. **Drive: 10 plays, 58 yards, 4:57.**
- SDG – Chris Chambers 44-yard pass from Philip Rivers (Nate Kaeding kick), 9:34. Chargers 7–3. **Drive: 6 plays, 80 yards, 3:01.**
- CAR – John Kasay 33-yard field goal, 4:23. Chargers 7–6. **Drive: 11 plays, 56 yards, 5:11.**
- CAR – John Kasay 30-yard field goal, 0:08. Panthers 9–7. **Drive: 11 plays, 55 yards, 2:45.**

**Third quarter**

- SDG – Nate Kaeding 27-yard field goal, 5:10. Chargers 10–9. **Drive: 12 plays, 51 yards, 7:10.**
- CAR – Chris Gamble 31-yard fumble return (John Kasay kick), 1:29. Panthers 16–10.

**Fourth quarter**

- CAR – John Kasay 24-yard field goal, 10:09. Panthers 19–10. **Drive: 7 plays, 16 yards, 4:34.**
- SDG – Antonio Gates 17-yard pass from Philip Rivers (Nate Kaeding kick), 6:45. Panthers 19–17. **Drive: 6 plays, 80 yards, 3:24.**
- SDG – Vincent Jackson 5-yard pass from Philip Rivers (Nate Kaeding kick), 2:27. Chargers 24–19. **Drive: 6 plays, 28 yards, 2:29.**
- CAR – Dante Rosario 14-yard pass from Jake Delhomme (John Kasay kick), 0:00. Panthers 26–24. **Drive: 11 plays, 68 yards, 2:27.**

**Top passers**

- CAR – Jake Delhomme – 23/41, 247 yards, TD
- SDG – Philip Rivers – 17/27, 217 yards, 3 TD

**Top rushers**

- CAR – DeAngelo Williams – 18 rushes, 86 yards
- SDG – LaDainian Tomlinson – 21 rushes, 97 yards

**Top receivers**

- CAR – Dante Rosario – 7 receptions, 96 yards, TD
- SDG – Antonio Gates – 4 receptions, 61 yards, TD

The Chargers began their 2008 campaign at home against the Carolina Panthers. After a scoreless first quarter, the Panthers pounced first as kicker John Kasay got a 44-yard field goal. The Chargers would take the lead with QB Philip Rivers completing a 44-yard TD pass to WR Chris Chambers, yet Carolina would take the halftime lead as Kasay nailed a 33-yard and a 30-yard field goal. In the third quarter, San Diego got the lead with kicker Nate Kaeding getting a 27-yard field goal, yet the Panthers regained the lead with CB Chris Gamble returning a fumble 31 yards for a touchdown. In the fourth quarter, Carolina increased its lead with Kasay nailing a 49-yard field goal. Afterwards, the Chargers got the lead again with Rivers completing a 24-yard TD pass to TE Antonio Gates and a 5-yard TD pass to WR Vincent Jackson. Unfortunately for San Diego, Panthers QB Jake Delhomme threw the game-winning 14-yard TD pass to TE Dante Rosario as time expired.

==== Week 2: at Denver Broncos ====
Week 2: San Diego Chargers at Denver Broncos

| Quarter | 1 | 2 | 3 | 4 | Total |
|---|---|---|---|---|---|
| Chargers | 3 | 14 | 10 | 11 | **38** |
| **Broncos** | 7 | 24 | 0 | 8 | **39** |

at Invesco Field at Mile High, Denver, Colorado

- Date: September 14
- Game time: 2:15 p.m. MDT
- Game weather: 59 °F (15 °C) (Partly Cloudy)
- Game attendance: 75,915
- Referee: Ed Hochuli
- TV announcers (CBS): Dick Enberg and Randy Cross
- Box score

Game information

**First quarter**

- DEN – Michael Pittman 1-yard run (Matt Prater kick), 8:41. Broncos 7–0. **Drive: 5 plays, 29 yards, 2:39.**
- SDG – Nate Kaeding 34-yard field goal, 3:47. Broncos 7–3. **Drive: 10 plays, 66 yards, 4:54.**

**Second quarter**

- DEN – Tony Scheffler 3-yard pass from Jay Cutler (Matt Prater kick), 13:48. Broncos 14–3. **Drive: 12 plays, 80 yards, 4:59.**
- DEN – Tony Scheffler 14-yard pass from Jay Cutler (Matt Prater kick), 10:42. Broncos 21–3. **Drive: 2 plays, 48 yards, 0:33.**
- SDG – Darren Sproles 103-yard kickoff return (Nate Kaeding kick), 10:28. Broncos 21–10. **Drive: 0 plays, 0 yards, 0:14.**
- DEN – Matt Prater 52-yard field goal, 5:53. Broncos 24–10. **Drive: 8 plays, 46 yards, 4:35.**
- SDG – Chris Chambers 48-yard pass from Philip Rivers (Nate Kaeding kick), 2:25. Broncos 24–17. **Drive: 6 plays, 80 yards, 3:28.**
- DEN – Brandon Marshall 6-yard pass from Jay Cutler (Matt Prater kick), 0:02. Broncos 31–17. **Drive: 11 plays, 80 yards, 2:23.**

**Third quarter**

- SDG – Chris Chambers 15-yard pass from Philip Rivers (Nate Kaeding kick), 10:44. Broncos 31–24. **Drive: 8 plays, 59 yards, 4:16.**
- SDG – Nate Kaeding 21-yard field goal, 7:29. Broncos 31–27. **Drive: 6 plays, 75 yards, 2:01.**

**Fourth quarter**

- SDG – Nate Kaeding 28-yard field goal, 14:08. Broncos 31–30. **Drive: 14 plays, 75 yards, 6:15.**
- SDG – Darren Sproles 66-yard pass from Philip Rivers (Legedu Naanee pass from Philip Rivers), 4:22. Chargers 38–31. **Drive: 3 plays, 91 yards, 1:07.**
- DEN – Eddie Royal 4-yard pass from Jay Cutler (Eddie Royal pass from Jay Cutler), 0:24. Broncos 39–38. **Drive: 12 plays, 80 yards, 3:58.**

**Top passers**

- SDG – Philip Rivers – 21/33, 377 yards, 3 TD, INT
- DEN – Jay Cutler – 36/50, 350 yards, 4 TD, INT

**Top rushers**

- SDG – Darren Sproles – 7 rushes, 53 yards
- DEN – Selvin Young – 8 rushes, 78 yards

**Top receivers**

- SDG – Chris Chambers – 4 receptions, 83 yards, 2 TD
- DEN – Brandon Marshall – 18 receptions, 166 yards, TD

Hoping to rebound from their last-second home loss to the Panthers, the Chargers flew to Invesco Field at Mile High for a Week 2 AFC West duel with the Denver Broncos. In the first quarter, San Diego trailed early as FB Michael Pittman getting a 1-yard TD run, after a Philip Rivers pass to Chris Chambers was ruled an interception on the field. The Chargers challenged the ruling, but the replay system was inoperative to the officials, so the ruling on the field stood. The 'Bolts would respond with kicker Nate Kaeding getting a 34-yard field goal. In the second quarter, Denver increased its lead with QB Jay Cutler completing a 3-yard and a 14-yard TD pass to TE Tony Scheffler. San Diego would immediately respond with RB Darren Sproles returning a kickoff 103-yard for a touchdown, yet the Broncos replied with kicker Matt Prater getting a 52-yard field goal. The Chargers would strike at Denver's lead as QB Philip Rivers completing a 48-yard TD pass to WR Chris Chambers, yet the Broncos would end the half with Cutler completing a 6-yard TD pass to WR Brandon Marshall.

In the third quarter, the 'Bolts began to rally as Rivers completed a 15-yard TD pass to Chambers, along with Kaeding nailing a 21-yard field goal. In the fourth quarter, San Diego took the lead with Kaeding's 28-yard field goal and Rivers’ 66-yard TD pass to Sproles. However, Denver responded with a 12-play, 80-yard drive (which included a second controversial officiating call that turned a game-winning fumble into an incomplete pass) that concluded with Cutler completing a 4-yard TD pass to WR Eddie Royal, including Cutler's 2-point conversion pass to Royal.

==== Week 3: vs. New York Jets ====
Week 3: New York Jets at San Diego Chargers

| Quarter | 1 | 2 | 3 | 4 | Total |
|---|---|---|---|---|---|
| Jets | 7 | 7 | 0 | 15 | **29** |
| **Chargers** | 10 | 21 | 7 | 10 | **48** |

at Qualcomm Stadium, San Diego, California

- Date: September 22
- Game time: 5:40 p.m. PDT
- Game weather: 71 °F (22 °C) (Sunny)
- Game attendance: 68,922
- Referee: Peter Morelli
- TV announcers (ESPN): Mike Tirico, Ron Jaworski, Tony Kornheiser, Michele Tafoya and Suzy Kolber
- Box score

Game information

**First quarter**

- NYJ – David Barrett 25-yard interception return (Jay Feely kick), 11:27. Jets 7–0.
- SDG – Nate Kaeding 36-yard field goal, 5:40. Jets 7–3. **Drive: 12 plays, 53 yards, 5:47.**
- SDG – Mike Tolbert 1-yard pass from Philip Rivers (Nate Kaeding kick), 2:03. Chargers 10–7. **Drive: 5 plays, 16 yards, 1:54.**

**Second quarter**

- SDG – Antonio Cromartie 52-yard interception return (Nate Kaeding kick), 14:48. Chargers 17–7.
- NYJ – Laveranues Coles 3-yard pass from Brett Favre (Jay Feely kick), 13:50. Chargers 17–14. **Drive: 2 plays, 5 yards, 0:58.**
- SDG – Chris Chambers 27-yard pass from Philip Rivers (Nate Kaeding kick), 11:17. Chargers 24–14. **Drive: 5 plays, 44 yards, 2:33.**
- SDG – Antonio Gates 6-yard pass from Philip Rivers (Nate Kaeding kick), 3:17. Chargers 31–14. **Drive: 10 plays, 45 yards, 5:50.**

**Third quarter**

- SDG – LaDainian Tomlinson 2-yard run (Nate Kaeding kick), 10:36. Chargers 38–14. **Drive: 7 plays, 79 yards, 4:24.**

**Fourth quarter**

- NYJ – Chansi Stuckey 4-yard pass from Brett Favre (run failed), 10:30. Chargers 38–20. **Drive: 15 plays, 83 yards, 5:28.**
- NYJ – Jay Feely 32-yard field goal, 8:21. Chargers 38–23. **Drive: 6 plays, 43 yards, 2:09.**
- SDG – LaDainian Tomlinson 2-yard run (Nate Kaeding kick), 3:55. Chargers 45–23. **Drive: 7 plays, 80 yards, 4:26.**
- NYJ – Dustin Keller 13-yard pass from Brett Favre (pass failed), 3:09. Chargers 45–29. **Drive: 2 plays, 19 yards, 0:46.**
- SDG – Nate Kaeding 49-yard field goal, 2:03. Chargers 48–29. **Drive: 4 plays, 8 yards, 1:06.**

**Top passers**

- NYJ – Brett Favre – 30/42, 271 yards, 3 TD, 2 INT
- SDG – Philip Rivers – 19/25, 250 yards, 3 TD, INT

**Top rushers**

- NYJ – Thomas Jones – 10 rushes, 37 yards
- SDG – LaDainian Tomlinson – 26 rushes, 67 yards, 2 TD

**Top receivers**

- NYJ – Jerricho Cotchery – 10 receptions, 76 yards
- SDG – Vincent Jackson – 3 receptions, 74 yards

Hoping to avoid an 0–3 start, the Chargers went home for a Week 3 Monday night duel with the New York Jets. In the first quarter, San Diego trailed early as Jets CB David Barrett returned an interception 25 yards for a touchdown on QB Philip Rivers' first attempted pass of the game. The Chargers responded with kicker Nate Kaeding’s 36-yard field goal and a Rivers 1-yard TD pass to rookie FB Mike Tolbert. In the second quarter, the 'Bolts increased their lead as CB Antonio Cromartie returned an interception 52 yards for a touchdown. New York tried to answer as QB Brett Favre completed a 3-yard TD pass to WR Laveranues Coles, yet the Chargers replied with Rivers completing a 27-yard TD pass to WR Chris Chambers and a 6-yard TD pass to TE Antonio Gates.

In the third quarter, San Diego continued its march as RB LaDainian Tomlinson got a 2-yard TD run. In the fourth quarter, the Jets tried to rally as Favre completed a 4-yard TD pass to WR Chansi Stuckey (with a failed 2-point conversion) and kicker Jay Feely got a 32-yard field goal. San Diego would answer with Tomlinson's 2-yard TD run. New York tried to make another rally as Favre completed a 13-yard TD pass to TE Dustin Keller (with another failed 2-point conversion), yet the 'Bolts pulled away as Kaeding nailed a 49-yard field goal.

==== Week 4: at Oakland Raiders ====
Week 4: San Diego Chargers at Oakland Raiders

| Quarter | 1 | 2 | 3 | 4 | Total |
|---|---|---|---|---|---|
| **Chargers** | 0 | 0 | 3 | 25 | **28** |
| Raiders | 5 | 10 | 0 | 3 | **18** |

at Oakland–Alameda County Coliseum, Oakland, California

- Date: September 28
- Game time: 1:05 p.m. PDT
- Game weather: 78 °F or 25.6 °C (Sunny)
- Game attendance: 61,808
- Referee: Alberto Riveron
- TV announcers (CBS): Jim Nantz & Phil Simms
- Box score

Game information

**First quarter**

- OAK – Sebastian Janikowski 22-yard field goal, 10:57. Raiders 3–0. **Drive: 5 plays, 37 yards, 0:38.**
- OAK – Safety, Gibril Wilson sacked Philip Rivers in end zone, 7:17. Raiders 5–0. **Drive: 3 plays, 35 yards, 1:14.**

**Second quarter**

- OAK – Zach Miller 63-yard pass from JaMarcus Russell (Sebastian Janikowski kick), 11:22. Raiders 12–0. **Drive: 5 plays, 37 yards, 0:38.**
- OAK – Sebastian Janikowski 28-yard field goal, 5:26. Raiders 15–0. **Drive: 5 plays, 37 yards, 0:38.**

**Third quarter**

- SDG – Nate Kaeding 28-yard field goal, 7:34. Raiders 15–3. **Drive: 6 plays, 16 yards, 2:09.**

**Fourth quarter**

- SDG – Antonio Gates 9-yard pass from Philip Rivers (Nate Kaeding kick), 14:12. Raiders 15–10. **Drive: 9 plays, 47 yards, 4:55.**
- SDG – LaDainian Tomlinson 13-yard run (Darren Sproles pass from Philip Rivers), 12:47. Chargers 18–15. **Drive: 9 plays, 47 yards, 4:55.**
- OAK – Sebastian Janikowski 32-yard field goal, 2:47. Tied 18–18. **Drive: 5 plays, 37 yards, 0:38.**
- SDG – Nate Kaeding 47-yard field goal, 1:51. Chargers 21–18. **Drive: 6 plays, 32 yards, 2:43.**
- SDG – LaDainian Tomlinson 41-yard run (Nate Kaeding kick), 1:04. Chargers 28–18. **Drive: 9 plays, 47 yards, 4:55.**

**Top passers**

- SDG – Philip Rivers – 14/25, 180 yards, TD, 2 INT
- OAK – JaMarcus Russell – 22/37, 277 yards, TD, INT

**Top rushers**

- SDG – LaDainian Tomlinson – 20 rushes, 106 yards, 2 TD
- OAK – Michael Bush – 14 rushes, 48 yards

**Top receivers**

- SDG – Antonio Gates – 5 receptions, 58 yards, TD
- OAK – Zach Miller – 5 receptions, 95 yards, TD

Coming off their home win over the Jets, the Chargers flew to Oakland–Alameda County Coliseum for a Week 4 AFC West duel with the Oakland Raiders. In the first quarter, the 'Bolts trailed early as Raiders kicker Sebastian Janikowski got a 22-yard field goal, along with safety Gibril Wilson sacking QB Philip Rivers in his endzone for a safety. In the second quarter, San Diego continued to trail as QB JaMarcus Russell completed a 63-yard TD pass to TE Zach Miller, along with Janikowski's 28-yard field goal.

In the third quarter the Chargers began to rally as kicker Nate Kaeding made a 28-yard field goal. In the fourth quarter, the 'Bolts continued their rally as Rivers completed a 9-yard TD pass to TE Antonio Gates, along with RB LaDainian Tomlinson getting a 13-yard TD run (with a successful 2-point conversion pass from Rivers to RB Darren Sproles). Oakland tried to respond as Janikowski got a 32-yard field goal, yet San Diego completed its comeback with Kaeding making a 47-yard field goal and Tomlinson rushing for a 41-yard TD run.

Through 15 games against a single opponent, LaDainian Tomlinson set a new record in touchdowns and yards against an opponent previously held by Barry Sanders, 1,763 yards, and Marcus Allen, 20 touchdowns, respectively, by totaling 1,815 yards and 21 touchdowns. In this game, Janikowski attempted and failed a 76-yard field goal.

==== Week 5: at Miami Dolphins ====
Week 5: San Diego Chargers at Miami Dolphins

| Quarter | 1 | 2 | 3 | 4 | Total |
|---|---|---|---|---|---|
| Chargers | 3 | 0 | 7 | 0 | **10** |
| **Dolphins** | 3 | 14 | 0 | 0 | **17** |

at Dolphin Stadium, Miami Gardens, Florida

- Date: October 5
- Game time: 1:03 p.m. EDT
- Game weather: 86 °F (30 °C) (Partly Cloudy)
- Game attendance: 65,063
- Referee: Walt Coleman
- TV announcers (CBS): Gus Johnson and Steve Tasker
- Box score

Game information

**First quarter**

- SDG – Nate Kaeding 34-yard field goal, 7:42. Chargers 3–0. **Drive: 14 plays, 61 yards, 7:18.**
- MIA – Dan Carpenter 47-yard field goal, 2:48. Tied 3–3. **Drive: 9 plays, 44 yards, 4:54.**

**Second quarter**

- MIA – Greg Camarillo 17-yard pass from Chad Pennington (Dan Carpenter kick), 5:25. Dolphins 10–3. **Drive: 9 plays, 65 yards, 5:13.**
- MIA – Ronnie Brown 5-yard run (Dan Carpenter kick), 0:41. Dolphins 17–3. **Drive: 11 plays, 79 yards, 3:40.**

**Third quarter**

- SDG – Chris Chambers 17-yard pass from Philip Rivers (Nate Kaeding kick), 3:13. Dolphins 17–10. **Drive: 7 plays, 68 yards, 2:52.**

**Fourth quarter**

- No scoring plays.

**Top passers**

- SDG – Philip Rivers – 13/28, 159 yards, TD
- MIA – Chad Pennington – 22/29, 228 yards, TD

**Top rushers**

- SDG – LaDainian Tomlinson – 12 rushes, 35 yards
- MIA – Ronnie Brown – 24 rushes, 125 yards, TD

**Top receivers**

- SDG – Vincent Jackson – 2 receptions, 56 yards
- MIA – Greg Camarillo – 6 receptions, 68 yards, TD

Coming off their divisional road win over the Raiders, the Chargers flew to Dolphin Stadium for a Week 5 duel with the Miami Dolphins. In the first quarter, the 'Bolts struck first with kicker Nate Kaeding getting a 34-yard field goal. The Dolphins would respond with kicker Dan Carpenter nailing a 47-yard field goal. In the second quarter, Miami took the lead as QB Chad Pennington completing a 17-yard TD pass to WR Greg Camarillo, along with RB Ronnie Brown getting a 5-yard TD run. In the third quarter, San Diego tried to rally as QB Philip Rivers completed a 17-yard TD pass to WR Chris Chambers (a former Dolphin). However, Miami's defense prevented the 'Bolts from striking again.

==== Week 6: vs. New England Patriots ====
Week 6: New England Patriots at San Diego Chargers

| Quarter | 1 | 2 | 3 | 4 | Total |
|---|---|---|---|---|---|
| Patriots | 0 | 3 | 0 | 7 | **10** |
| **Chargers** | 10 | 7 | 10 | 3 | **30** |

at Qualcomm Stadium, San Diego, California

- Date: October 12
- Game time: 5:15 p.m. PDT
- Game weather: 69 °F or 20.6 °C (Sunny)
- Game attendance: 68,704
- Referee: Bill Leavy
- TV announcers (NBC): Al Michaels (play-by-play), John Madden (color commentator), & Andrea Kremer (sideline reporter)
- Box score

Game information

**First quarter**

- SDG – Nate Kaeding 25-yard field goal, 10:41. Chargers 3–0. **Drive: 10 plays, 73 yards, 4:19.**
- SDG – Malcom Floyd 49-yard pass from Philip Rivers (Nate Kaeding kick), 3:58. Chargers 10–0. **Drive: 4 plays, 62 yards, 1:55.**

**Second quarter**

- NE – Stephen Gostkowski 47-yard field goal, 7:13. Chargers 10–3. **Drive: 7 plays, 14 yards, 3:30.**
- SDG – Vincent Jackson 4-yard pass from Philip Rivers (Nate Kaeding kick), 1:07. Chargers 17–3. **Drive: 4 plays, 31 yards, 1:15.**

**Third quarter**

- SDG – Antonio Gates 1-yard pass from Philip Rivers (Nate Kaeding kick), 7:07. Chargers 24–3. **Drive: 4 plays, 98 yards, 2:05.**
- SDG – Nate Kaeding 35-yard field goal, 4:20. Chargers 27–3. **Drive: 4 plays, 9 yards, 2:35.**

**Fourth quarter**

- SDG – Nate Kaeding 23-yard field goal, 10:50. Chargers 30–3. **Drive: 13 plays, 77 yards, 6:50.**
- NE – Sammy Morris 1-yard run (Stephen Gostkowski kick), 5:18. Chargers 30–10. **Drive: 8 plays, 46 yards, 3:41.**

**Top passers**

- NE – Matt Cassel – 22/38, 203 yards, INT
- SDG – Philip Rivers – 18/27, 306 yards, 3 TD

**Top rushers**

- NE – Kevin Faulk – 8 rushes, 48 yards
- SDG – LaDainian Tomlinson – 20 rushes, 74 yards

**Top receivers**

- NE – Wes Welker – 9 receptions, 73 yards
- SDG – Vincent Jackson – 5 receptions, 134 yards, TD

Hoping to rebound from their road loss to the Dolphins, the Chargers went home, donned their alternate uniforms, and played a Week 6 Sunday night duel with the New England Patriots, in a rematch of last year's AFC Championship game.

In the first quarter, the 'Bolts struck first as kicker Nate Kaeding got a 25-yard field goal, along with QB Philip Rivers completing a 49-yard TD pass to WR Malcom Floyd. In the second quarter, the Patriots got on the board as kicker Stephen Gostkowski got a 47-yard field goal. San Diego closed out the half with Rivers completing a 4-yard TD pass to WR Vincent Jackson.

In the third quarter, the Chargers continued its victory march as Rivers completed a 1-yard TD pass to TE Antonio Gates, along with Kaeding kicking a 35-yard field goal. In the fourth quarter, the 'Bolts closed out the night with Kaeding nailing a 35-yard field goal. New England would respond with RB Sammy Morris getting a 1-yard TD run, yet San Diego was too much for them.

==== Week 7: at Buffalo Bills ====
Week 7: San Diego Chargers at Buffalo Bills

| Quarter | 1 | 2 | 3 | 4 | Total |
|---|---|---|---|---|---|
| Chargers | 7 | 0 | 7 | 0 | **14** |
| **Bills** | 3 | 10 | 7 | 3 | **23** |

at Ralph Wilson Stadium, Orchard Park, New York

- Date: October 19
- Game time: 1:00 p.m. EDT
- Game weather: 51 °F or 10.6 °C (Sunny)
- Game attendance: 71,602
- Referee: Jeff Triplette
- TV announcers (CBS): Greg Gumbel and Dan Dierdorf
- Box score

Game information

**First quarter**

- BUF – Rian Lindell 38-yard field goal, 6:46. Bills 3–0. **Drive: 9 plays, 52 yards, 5:44.**
- SDG – Malcom Floyd 14-yard pass from Philip Rivers (Nate Kaeding kick), 0:21. Chargers 7–3. **Drive: 11 plays, 78 yards, 6:25.**

**Second quarter**

- BUF – Lee Evans 2-yard pass from Trent Edwards (Rian Lindell kick), 5:20. Bills 10–7. **Drive: 7 plays, 38 yards, 4:05.**
- BUF – Rian Lindell 27-yard field goal, 0:16. Bills 13–7. **Drive: 10 plays, 59 yards, 3:17.**

**Third quarter**

- SDG – Vincent Jackson 12-yard pass from Philip Rivers (Nate Kaeding kick), 6:28. Chargers 14–13. **Drive: 12 plays, 80 yards, 6:17.**
- BUF – Marshawn Lynch 9-yard run (Rian Lindell kick), 0:33. Bills 20–14. **Drive: 9 plays, 78 yards, 5:55.**

**Fourth quarter**

- BUF – Rian Lindell 44-yard field goal, 3:17. Bills 23–14. **Drive: 7 plays, 43 yards, 2:48.**

**Top passers**

- SDG – Philip Rivers – 22/29, 208 yards, 2 TD, INT
- BUF – Trent Edwards – 25/30, 261 yards, TD

**Top rushers**

- SDG – LaDainian Tomlinson – 14 rushes, 41 yards
- BUF – Marshawn Lynch – 19 rushes, 70 yards, TD

**Top receivers**

- SDG – Malcom Floyd – 4 receptions, 65 yards, TD
- BUF – Lee Evans – 8 receptions, 89 yards, TD

==== Week 8: at New Orleans Saints ====
Week 8: San Diego Chargers at New Orleans Saints

| Quarter | 1 | 2 | 3 | 4 | Total |
|---|---|---|---|---|---|
| Chargers | 3 | 14 | 3 | 12 | **32** |
| **Saints** | 3 | 20 | 7 | 7 | **37** |

at Wembley Stadium, London, England

- Date: October 26
- Game time: 5:00 p.m. GMT
- Game weather: 54 °F (12 °C) (Mostly Cloudy)
- Game attendance: 83,226
- Referee: Tony Corrente
- TV announcers (CBS): Jim Nantz and Phil Simms
- Box score

Game information

**First quarter**

- NO – Taylor Mehlhaff 23-yard field goal, 6:34. Saints 3–0. **Drive: 14 plays, 69 yards, 8:26.**
- SDG – Nate Kaeding 33-yard field goal, 3:30. Tied 3–3. **Drive: 7 plays, 51 yards, 3:04.**

**Second quarter**

- NO – Devery Henderson 12-yard pass from Drew Brees (kick failed), 11:02. Saints 9–3. **Drive: 10 plays, 89 yards, 4:06.**
- NO – Deuce McAllister 1-yard run (Taylor Mehlhaff kick), 8:52. Saints 16–3. **Drive: 6 plays, 25 yards, 2:00.**
- SDG – LaDainian Tomlinson 12-yard pass from Philip Rivers (Nate Kaeding kick), 5:35. Saints 16–10. **Drive: 7 plays, 66 yards, 3:17.**
- NO – Lance Moore 30-yard pass from Drew Brees (Taylor Mehlhaff kick), 3:29. Saints 23–10. **Drive: 4 plays, 76 yards, 2:06.**
- SDG – Antonio Gates 12-yard pass from Philip Rivers (Nate Kaeding kick), 1:08. Saints 23–17. **Drive: 5 plays, 64 yards, 2:21.**

**Third quarter**

- NO – Mark Campbell 1-yard pass from Drew Brees (Taylor Mehlhaff kick), 10:15. Saints 30–17. **Drive: 8 plays, 87 yards, 3:43.**
- SDG – Nate Kaeding 24-yard field goal, 3:25. Saints 30–20. **Drive: 12 plays, 64 yards, 6:50.**

**Fourth quarter**

- NO – Mike Karney 1-yard run (Taylor Mehlhaff kick), 14:49. Saints 37–20. **Drive: 7 plays, 77 yards, 3:36.**
- SDG – Nate Kaeding 31-yard field goal, 9:35. Saints 37–23. **Drive: 12 plays, 63 yards, 5:14.**
- SDG – Vincent Jackson 14-yard pass from Philip Rivers (Nate Kaeding kick), 7:21. Saints 37–30. **Drive: 5 plays, 57 yards, 2:14.**
- SDG – Safety, Drew Brees fumbled out of end zone, 0:08. Saints 37–32.

**Top passers**

- SDG – Philip Rivers – 25/40, 341 yards, 3 TD, INT
- NO – Drew Brees – 30/41, 339 yards, 3 TD

**Top rushers**

- SDG – LaDainian Tomlinson – 19 rushes, 105 yards
- NO – Deuce McAllister – 18 rushes, 55 yards, TD

**Top receivers**

- SDG – Antonio Gates – 6 receptions, 96 yards, TD
- NO – Lance Moore – 6 receptions, 90 yards, TD

Hoping to rebound from their road loss to the Bills, the Chargers flew to Wembley Stadium for the 2008 International Series game with the New Orleans Saints.

In the first quarter, San Diego trailed early as kicker Taylor Mehlhaff got a 23-yard field goal. The 'Bolts would respond with kicker Nate Kaeding getting a 33-yard field goal. In the second quarter, New Orleans regained the lead as QB Drew Brees (a former Charger) completed a 12-yard TD pass to WR Devery Henderson (with a failed PAT) and RB Deuce McAllister getting a 1-yard TD run. San Diego answered as QB Philip Rivers completed a 12-yard TD pass to RB LaDainian Tomlinson, but the Saints replied with Brees completing a 30-yard TD pass to WR Lance Moore. The Chargers closed out the half with Rivers completing a 12-yard TD pass to TE Antonio Gates.

In the third quarter, New Orleans increased its lead Brees completing a 1-yard TD pass to TE Mark Campbell, after a very controversial pass interference call on cornerback Cletis Gordon put the Saints on the 1-yard line. The 'Bolts would answer with Kaeding getting a 24-yard field goal. In the fourth quarter, the Saints continued to build its lead as FB Mike Karney got a 1-yard TD run. San Diego tried to rally as Kaeding nailed a 31-yard field goal, Rivers completed a 14-yard TD pass to WR Vincent Jackson, and Brees giving the 'Bolts a safety via an incomplete pass thrown into the back of his own endzone. However, New Orleans’ defense stiffened for the win.

==== Week 10: vs. Kansas City Chiefs ====
Week 10: Kansas City Chiefs at San Diego Chargers

| Quarter | 1 | 2 | 3 | 4 | Total |
|---|---|---|---|---|---|
| Chiefs | 7 | 6 | 0 | 6 | **19** |
| **Chargers** | 0 | 6 | 7 | 7 | **20** |

at Qualcomm Stadium, San Diego, California

- Date: November 9
- Game time: 1:15 p.m. PST
- Game weather: 62 °F (17 °C) (Cloudy)
- Game attendance: 67,510
- Referee: Ron Winter
- TV announcers (CBS): Gus Johnson and Steve Tasker
- Box score

Game information

**First quarter**

- KAN – Mark Bradley 30-yard pass from Tyler Thigpen (Connor Barth kick), 3:15. Chiefs 7–0. **Drive: 7 plays, 19 yards, 3:41.**

**Second quarter**

- SDG – Nate Kaeding 34-yard field goal, 14:03. Chiefs 7–3. **Drive: 12 plays, 66 yards, 6:41.**
- SDG – Nate Kaeding 26-yard field goal, 6:47. Chiefs 7–6. **Drive: 4 plays, 3 yards, 2:20.**
- KAN – Tony Gonzalez 34-yard pass from Tyler Thigpen (pass failed), 3:11. Chiefs 13–6. **Drive: 7 plays, 41 yards, 2:55.**

**Third quarter**

- SDG – Malcom Floyd 5-yard pass from Philip Rivers (Nate Kaeding kick), 3:43. Tied 13–13. **Drive: 4 plays, 3 yards, 2:20.**

**Fourth quarter**

- SDG – Antonio Gates 8-yard pass from Philip Rivers (Nate Kaeding kick), 6:55. Chargers 20–13. **Drive: 4 plays, 3 yards, 2:20.**
- KAN – Tony Gonzalez 3-yard pass from Tyler Thigpen (pass failed), 0:23. Chargers 20–19. **Drive: 7 plays, 41 yards, 2:55.**

**Top passers**

- KAN – Tyler Thigpen – 27/41, 266 yards, 3 TD
- SDG – Philip Rivers – 27/36, 316 yards, 2 TD, 2 INT

**Top rushers**

- KAN – Dantrell Savage – 12 rushes, 44 yards
- SDG – LaDainian Tomlinson – 22 rushes, 78 yards

**Top receivers**

- KAN – Tony Gonzalez – 10 receptions, 113 yards, 2 TD
- SDG – Vincent Jackson – 5 receptions, 83 yards

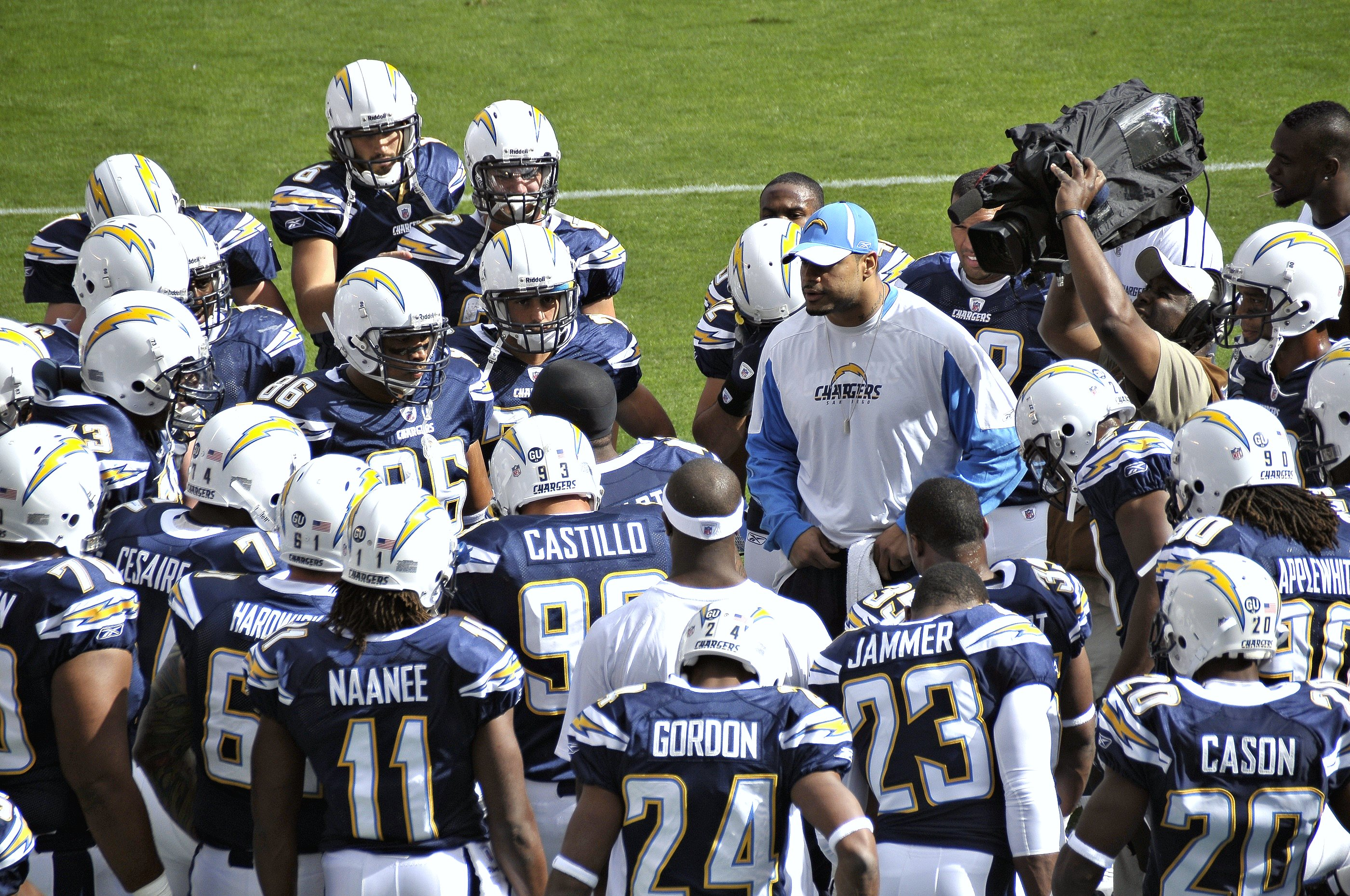
Shawne Merriman participates in the Chargers’ pregame huddle at Kansas City, week 10

Coming off their bye week, the Chargers went home for a Week 10 AFC West duel with the Kansas City Chiefs. In the first quarter, San Diego trailed early as Chiefs QB Tyler Thigpen completed a 30-yard TD pass to WR Mark Bradley. In the second quarter, the 'Bolts got on the board as kicker Nate Kaeding got a 34-yard and a 26-yard field goal. Kansas City would close out the half as Thigpen completed a 34-yard TD pass to TE Tony Gonzalez (with a failed 2-point conversion).

In the third quarter, the Chargers tied the game as QB Philip Rivers completed a 5-yard TD pass to WR Malcom Floyd. In the fourth quarter, San Diego took the lead as Rivers completed an 8-yard TD pass to TE Antonio Gates. The Chiefs tried to rally as Thigpen completed a 3-yard TD pass to Gonzalez after a controversial pass interference call on safety Clinton Hart. Fortunately, the Chargers’ defense stopped both the 2-point conversion and the ensuing onside kick to preserve their much-needed victory.

==== Week 11: at Pittsburgh Steelers ====
Week 11: San Diego Chargers at Pittsburgh Steelers

| Quarter | 1 | 2 | 3 | 4 | Total |
|---|---|---|---|---|---|
| Chargers | 7 | 0 | 0 | 3 | **10** |
| **Steelers** | 0 | 5 | 3 | 3 | **11** |

at Heinz Field, Pittsburgh, Pennsylvania

- Date: November 16
- Game time: 4:15 p.m. EST
- Game weather: 35 °F (2 °C) (Snowy)
- Game attendance: 62,051
- Referee: Scott Green
- TV announcers (CBS): Jim Nantz and Phil Simms
- Box score

Game information

**First quarter**

- SDG – LaDainian Tomlinson 3-yard run (Nate Kaeding kick), 6:46. Chargers 7–0. **Drive: 6 plays, 59 yards, 3:30.**

**Second quarter**

- PIT – Safety, Marcus McNeill tackled in the end zone by James Harrison, 14:46. Chargers 7–2.
- PIT – Jeff Reed 21-yard field goal, 0:00. Chargers 7–5. **Drive: 8 plays, 54 yards, 1:23.**

**Third quarter**

- PIT – Jeff Reed 41-yard field goal, 8:41. Steelers 8–7. **Drive: 14 plays, 54 yards, 6:19.**
- SDG – Nate Kaeding 22-yard field goal, 6:41. Chargers 10–8. **Drive: 17 plays, 78 yards, 7:34.**

**Fourth quarter**

- PIT – Jeff Reed 32-yard field goal, 0:11. Steelers 11–10. **Drive: 13 plays, 73 yards, 6:30.**

**Top passers**

- SDG – Philip Rivers – 15/26, 164 yards, 2 INT
- PIT – Ben Roethlisberger – 31/41, 308 yards

**Top rushers**

- SDG – LaDainian Tomlinson – 18 rushes, 57 yards, TD
- PIT – Willie Parker – 25 rushes, 115 yards

**Top receivers**

- SDG – LaDainian Tomlinson – 3 receptions, 45 yards
- PIT – Hines Ward – 11 receptions, 124 yards

Coming off their divisional home win over the Chiefs, the Chargers flew to Heinz Field for a Week 11 duel with the Pittsburgh Steelers. In the first quarter, the 'Bolts struck first as RB LaDainian Tomlinson got a 3-yard TD run. In the second quarter, the Steelers slowly responded as LB James Harrison forced a fumble from QB Philip Rivers in his own endzone, which was picked up by OT Marcus McNeill, who got tackled by Harrison in the endzone for a safety. Pittsburgh would end the half as kicker Jeff Reed got a 21-yard field goal.

In the third quarter, the Steelers took the lead as Reed made a 22-yard field goal. In the fourth quarter, San Diego regained the lead as kicker Nate Kaeding made a 22-yard field goal. However, Pittsburgh got the lead as Reed nailed a 32-yard field goal.

==== Week 12: vs. Indianapolis Colts ====
Week 12: Indianapolis Colts at San Diego Chargers

| Quarter | 1 | 2 | 3 | 4 | Total |
|---|---|---|---|---|---|
| **Colts** | 3 | 7 | 7 | 6 | **23** |
| Chargers | 0 | 10 | 0 | 10 | **20** |

at Qualcomm Stadium, San Diego, California

- Date: November 23
- Game time: 5:20 p.m. PST
- Game weather: 58 °F (14 °C) (Clear)
- Game attendance: 68,428
- Referee: Gene Steratore
- TV announcers (NBC): Al Michaels (play-by-play), John Madden (color commentator), and Andrea Kremer (field reporter)
- Box score

Game information

**First quarter**

- IND – Adam Vinatieri 23-yard field goal, 1:42. Colts 3–0. **Drive: 12 plays, 62 yards, 5:40.**

**Second quarter**

- SDG – Nate Kaeding 35-yard field goal, 11:43. Tied 3–3. **Drive: 9 plays, 66 yards, 4:59.**
- SDG – Vincent Jackson 39-yard pass from Philip Rivers (Nate Kaeding kick), 4:56. Chargers 10–3. **Drive: 9 plays, 89 yards, 4:35.**
- IND – Anthony Gonzalez 13-yard pass from Peyton Manning (Adam Vinatieri kick), 0:38. Tied 10–10. **Drive: 9 plays, 71 yards, 4:18.**

**Third quarter**

- IND – Dominic Rhodes 1-yard pass from Peyton Manning (Adam Vinatieri kick), 3:51. Colts 17–10. **Drive: 13 plays, 66 yards, 7:10.**

**Fourth quarter**

- IND – Adam Vinatieri 38-yard field goal, 11:48. Colts 20–10. **Drive: 13 plays, 62 yards, 4:10.**
- SDG – Jacob Hester 1-yard pass from Philip Rivers (Nate Kaeding kick), 5:36. Colts 20–17. **Drive: 12 plays, 70 yards, 6:12.**
- SDG – Nate Kaeding 47-yard field goal, 1:30. Tied 20–20. **Drive: 8 plays, 58 yards, 1:45.**
- IND – Adam Vinatieri 51-yard field goal, 0:00. Colts 23–20. **Drive: 8 plays, 37 yards, 1:30.**

**Top passers**

- IND – Peyton Manning – 32/44, 255 yards, 2 TD, INT
- SDG – Philip Rivers – 24/31, 288 yards, 2 TD

**Top rushers**

- IND – Joseph Addai – 16 rushes, 70 yards
- SDG – LaDainian Tomlinson – 21 rushes, 84 yards

**Top receivers**

- IND – Anthony Gonzalez – 6 receptions, 95 yards, TD
- SDG – Chris Chambers – 6 receptions, 61 yards

Hoping to rebound from their road loss to the Steelers, the Chargers went home for a Week 12 Sunday Night game with the Indianapolis Colts. In the first quarter, San Diego trailed early as Colts kicker Adam Vinatieri made a 23-yard field goal. In the second quarter, the 'Bolts took the lead as kicker Nate Kaeding got a 35-yard field goal, while QB Philip Rivers completed a 39-yard TD pass to WR Vincent Jackson. Indianapolis would tie the game with QB Peyton Manning completing a 13-yard TD pass to WR Anthony Gonzalez.

In the third quarter, the Colts took the lead with Manning's 1-yard TD pass to RB Dominic Rhodes. In the fourth quarter, Indianapolis increased their lead as Vinatieri got a 38-yard field goal. San Diego would rally to tie the game as Rivers completed a 1-yard TD pass to rookie FB Jacob Hester, while Kaeding made a 47-yard field goal. However, the Colts came out on top as Vinatieri nailed the game-winning 51-yard field goal.

==== Week 13: vs. Atlanta Falcons ====
Week 13: Atlanta Falcons at San Diego Chargers

| Quarter | 1 | 2 | 3 | 4 | Total |
|---|---|---|---|---|---|
| **Falcons** | 6 | 9 | 0 | 7 | **22** |
| Chargers | 7 | 0 | 6 | 3 | **16** |

at Qualcomm Stadium, San Diego

- Date: November 30
- Game time: 1:05 p.m. PST
- Game weather: 73 °F (23 °C) (Sunny)
- Game attendance: 67,200
- Referee: Mike Carey
- TV announcers (FOX): Matt Vasgersian, J. C. Pearson and Nischelle Turner
- Box score

Game information

**First quarter**

- ATL – Jason Elam 35-yard field goal, 5:56. Falcons 3–0. **Drive: 7 plays, 79 yards, 4:24.**
- SDG – LaDainian Tomlinson 3-yard run (Nate Kaeding kick), 1:41. Chargers 7–3. **Drive: 4 plays, 20 yards, 1:28.**
- ATL – Jason Elam 40-yard field goal, 0:00. Chargers 7–6. **Drive: 5 plays, 42 yards, 1:41.**

**Second quarter**

- ATL – Justin Peelle 18-yard pass from Matt Ryan (Jason Elam kick), 9:24. Falcons 13–7. **Drive: 8 plays, 46 yards, 3:31.**
- ATL – Safety, Philip Rivers penalized for intentional grounding in end zone, 7:54. Falcons 15–7.

**Third quarter**

- SDG – Eric Weddle 86-yard defensive fumble return (run failed), 12:08. Falcons 15–13.

**Fourth quarter**

- ATL – Harry Douglas 5-yard pass from Matt Ryan (Jason Elam kick), 14:56. Falcons 22–13. **Drive: 11 plays, 72 yards, 5:46.**
- SDG – Nate Kaeding 28-yard field goal, 5:15. Falcons 22–16. **Drive: 10 plays, 35 yards, 3:50.**

**Top passers**

- ATL – Matt Ryan – 17/23, 207 yards, 2 TD
- SDG – Philip Rivers – 17/30, 149 yards

**Top rushers**

- ATL – Michael Turner – 31 rushes, 120 yards
- SDG – Jacob Hester – 1 rush, 28 yards

**Top receivers**

- ATL – Roddy White – 6 receptions, 112 yards
- SDG – Malcom Floyd – 5 receptions, 59 yards

Hoping to rebound from their last-second loss to the Colts, the Chargers stayed at home for a Week 13 interconference duel with the Atlanta Falcons. In the first quarter, San Diego trailed early as Falcons kicker Jason Elam got a 35-yard field goal. The 'Bolts would strike back as RB LaDainian Tomlinson got a 3-yard TD run (which was his 136th career TD, tying him with Marshall Faulk for fifth all-time). Atlanta answered with Elam making a 40-yard field goal. In the second quarter, the Falcons took the lead as QB Matt Ryan completed an 18-yard TD pass to former Chargers TE Justin Peelle, along with Atlanta's defense forcing QB Philip Rivers to commit intentional grounding from his own endzone, giving the Falcons a safety.

In the third quarter, San Diego began to charge back as safety Eric Weddle returned a fumble 86 yards for a touchdown (with a failed two-point conversion). In the fourth quarter, Atlanta began to pull away as Ryan completed a 5-yard TD pass to WR Harry Douglas. The Chargers tried to come back as kicker Nate Kaeding nailed a 28-yard field goal. However, the Falcons’ defense prevented any possible comeback.

==== Week 14: vs. Oakland Raiders ====
Week 14: Oakland Raiders at San Diego Chargers

| Quarter | 1 | 2 | 3 | 4 | Total |
|---|---|---|---|---|---|
| Raiders | 0 | 7 | 0 | 0 | **7** |
| **Chargers** | 10 | 17 | 0 | 7 | **34** |

at Qualcomm Stadium, San Diego, California

- Date: December 4
- Game time: 5:15 p.m. PDT
- Game weather: 62 °F (17 °C) (Clear)
- Game attendance: 68,097
- Referee: Tony Corrente
- TV announcers (NFLN): Bob Papa and Cris Collinsworth
- Box score

Game information

**First quarter**

- SDG – Nate Kaeding 20-yard field goal, 11:47. Chargers 3–0. **Drive: 7 plays, 59 yards, 3:13.**
- SDG – LaDainian Tomlinson 3-yard run (Nate Kaeding kick), 8:43. Chargers 10–0. **Drive: 3 plays, 12 yards, 1:24.**

**Second quarter**

- SDG – Darren Sproles 8-yard pass from Philip Rivers (Nate Kaeding kick), 12:58. Chargers 17–0. **Drive: 15 plays, 96 yards, 8:29.**
- SDG – Vincent Jackson 59-yard pass from Philip Rivers (Nate Kaeding kick), 9:02. Chargers 24–0. **Drive: 3 plays, 63 yards, 0:49.**
- SDG – Nate Kaeding 39-yard field goal, 0:23. Chargers 27–0. **Drive: 7 plays, 16 yards, 1:19.**
- OAK – Justin Miller 92-yard kickoff return (Sebastian Janikowski kick), 0:10. Chargers 27–7. **Drive: 0 plays, 0 yards, 0:13.**

**Third quarter**

- No scoring plays.

**Fourth quarter**

- SDG – Darren Sproles 18-yard pass from Philip Rivers (Nate Kaeding kick), 7:19. Chargers 34–7. **Drive: 8 plays, 53 yards, 4:50.**

**Top passers**

- OAK – JaMarcus Russell – 9/13, 68 yards, 2 INT
- SDG – Philip Rivers – 10/22, 214 yards, 3 TD

**Top rushers**

- OAK – Justin Fargas – 12 rushes, 50 yards
- SDG – LaDainian Tomlinson – 25 rushes, 91 yards, TD

**Top receivers**

- OAK – Zach Miller – 8 receptions, 54 yards
- SDG – Vincent Jackson – 5 receptions, 148 yards, TD

Trying to snap a three-game losing streak, the Chargers stayed at home, donned their alternate uniforms again, and played a Week 14 AFC West rematch with the Oakland Raiders. In the first quarter, the 'Bolts struck first as kicker Nate Kaeding got a 20-yard field goal, along with RB LaDainian Tomlinson getting a 3-yard TD run. In the second quarter, San Diego increased their lead as QB Philip Rivers completed an 8-yard TD pass to RB Darren Sproles and a 59-yard TD pass to WR Vincent Jackson, while Kaeding made a 39-yard field goal. Oakland would close out the half with CB Justin Miller returning a kickoff 98 yards for a touchdown. After a scoreless third quarter, the 'Bolts pulled away in the fourth quarter as Rivers hooked up with Sproles again on an 18-yard TD pass.

==== Week 15: at Kansas City Chiefs ====
Week 15: San Diego Chargers at Kansas City Chiefs

| Quarter | 1 | 2 | 3 | 4 | Total |
|---|---|---|---|---|---|
| **Chargers** | 0 | 3 | 7 | 12 | **22** |
| Chiefs | 7 | 7 | 7 | 0 | **21** |

at Arrowhead Stadium, Kansas City, Missouri

- Date: December 14
- Game time: 12:00 p.m. CDT
- Game weather: 36 °F (2 °C) (Cloudy)
- Game attendance: 72,842
- Referee: Carl Cheffers
- TV announcers (CBS): Ian Eagle and Solomon Wilcots
- Box score

Game information

**First quarter**

- KAN – Tony Gonzalez 4-yard pass from Larry Johnson (Connor Barth kick), 4:59. Chiefs 7–0. **Drive: 15 plays, 96 yards, 7:56.**

**Second quarter**

- KAN – Dwayne Bowe 1-yard pass from Tyler Thigpen (Connor Barth kick), 2:53. Chiefs 14–0. **Drive: 9 plays, 54 yards, 5:09.**
- SDG – Nate Kaeding 25-yard field goal, 0:11. Chiefs 14–3. **Drive: 3 plays, 38 yards, 2:42.**

**Third quarter**

- KAN – Tyler Thigpen 3-yard run (Connor Barth kick), 12:35. Chiefs 21–3. **Drive: 1 play, 3 yards, 0:04.**
- SDG – LaDainian Tomlinson 6-yard run (Nate Kaeding kick), 8:29. Chiefs 21–10. **Drive: 10 plays, 65 yards, 4:06.**

**Fourth quarter**

- SDG – Malcom Floyd 4-yard pass from Philip Rivers (pass failed), 1:13. Chiefs 21–16. **Drive: 15 plays, 89 yards, 3:42.**
- SDG – Vincent Jackson 10-yard pass from Philip Rivers (pass failed), 0:36. Chargers 22–21. **Drive: 4 plays, 61 yards, 0:37.**

**Top passers**

- SDG – Philip Rivers – 34/48, 346 yards, 2 TD, INT
- KAN – Tyler Thigpen – 19/28, 171 yards, TD, INT

**Top rushers**

- SDG – LaDainian Tomlinson – 15 rushes, 39 yards, TD
- KAN – Larry Johnson – 17 rushes, 55 yards

**Top receivers**

- SDG – Vincent Jackson – 6 receptions, 89 yards, TD
- KAN – Tony Gonzalez – 6 receptions, 62 yards, TD

Hoping to get a second straight win and stay alive for the playoffs, the Chargers went to Kansas City for a divisional road game vs. the Chiefs. The 'Bolts trailed early as RB Larry Johnson threw a 4-yard TD pass to TE Tony Gonzalez. The Chiefs extended the lead to 14–0 when QB Tyler Thigpen completed a 1-yard TD pass to WR Dwayne Bowe. The 'Bolts closed out the half with Nate Kaeding getting a 32-yard field goal. The Chiefs started the second half by Thigpen scrambling for a 3-yard TD. The Chargers started to rally as RB LaDainian Tomlinson ran for a 6-yard touchdown, while QB Philip Rivers completed a 4-yard TD pass to Malcom Floyd (with a failed 2-pt conversion) with 1:19 left in the game. The 'Bolts recovered the onside kick and Rivers threw a 10-yard TD to WR Vincent Jackson with 40 seconds left (with another failed 2-pt try) to take a 22–21 lead. The Chiefs’ only answer was kicker Connor Barth's 50-yard field goal try sailing wide left as time expired.

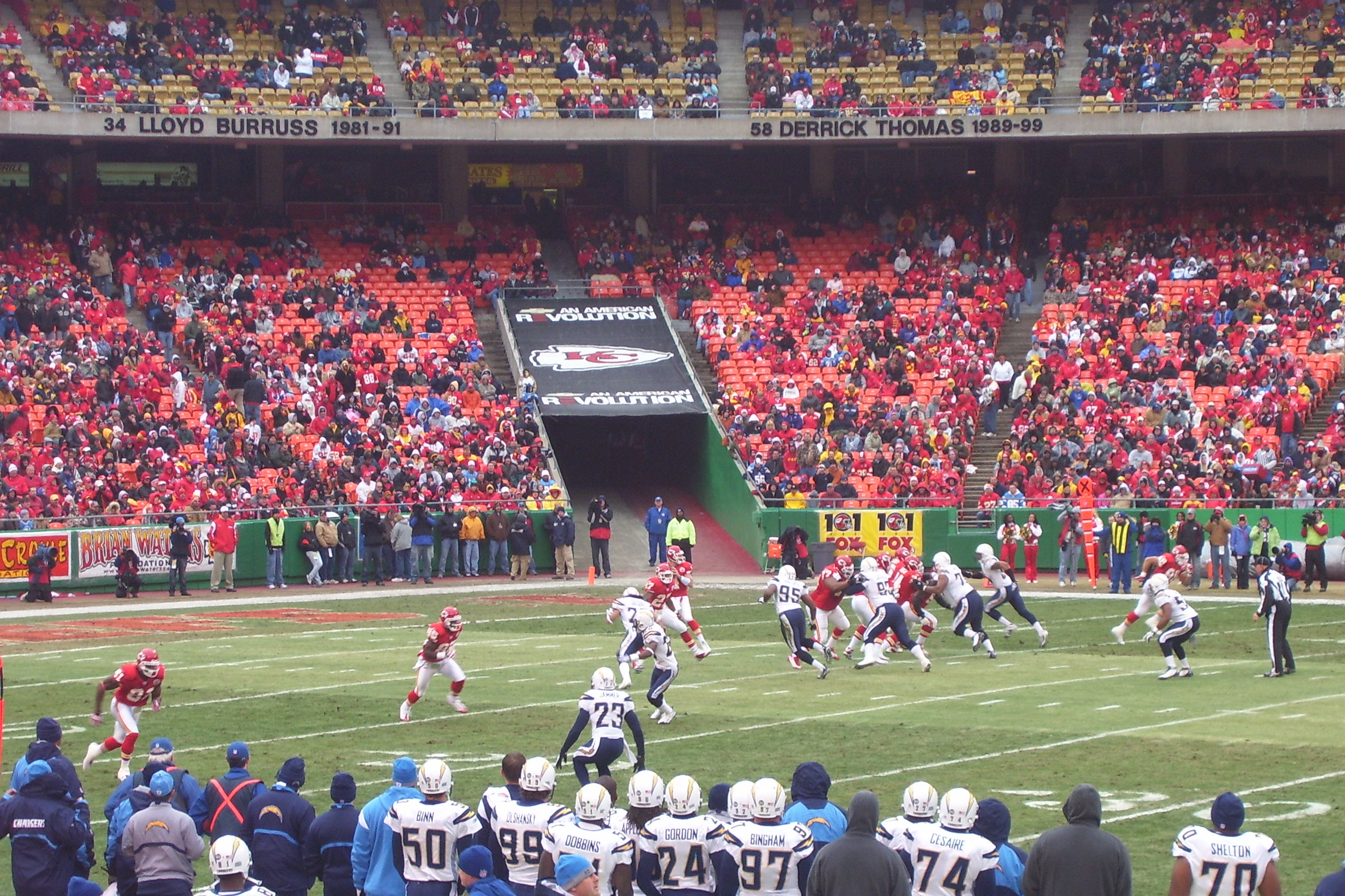
Action in the week 15 clash

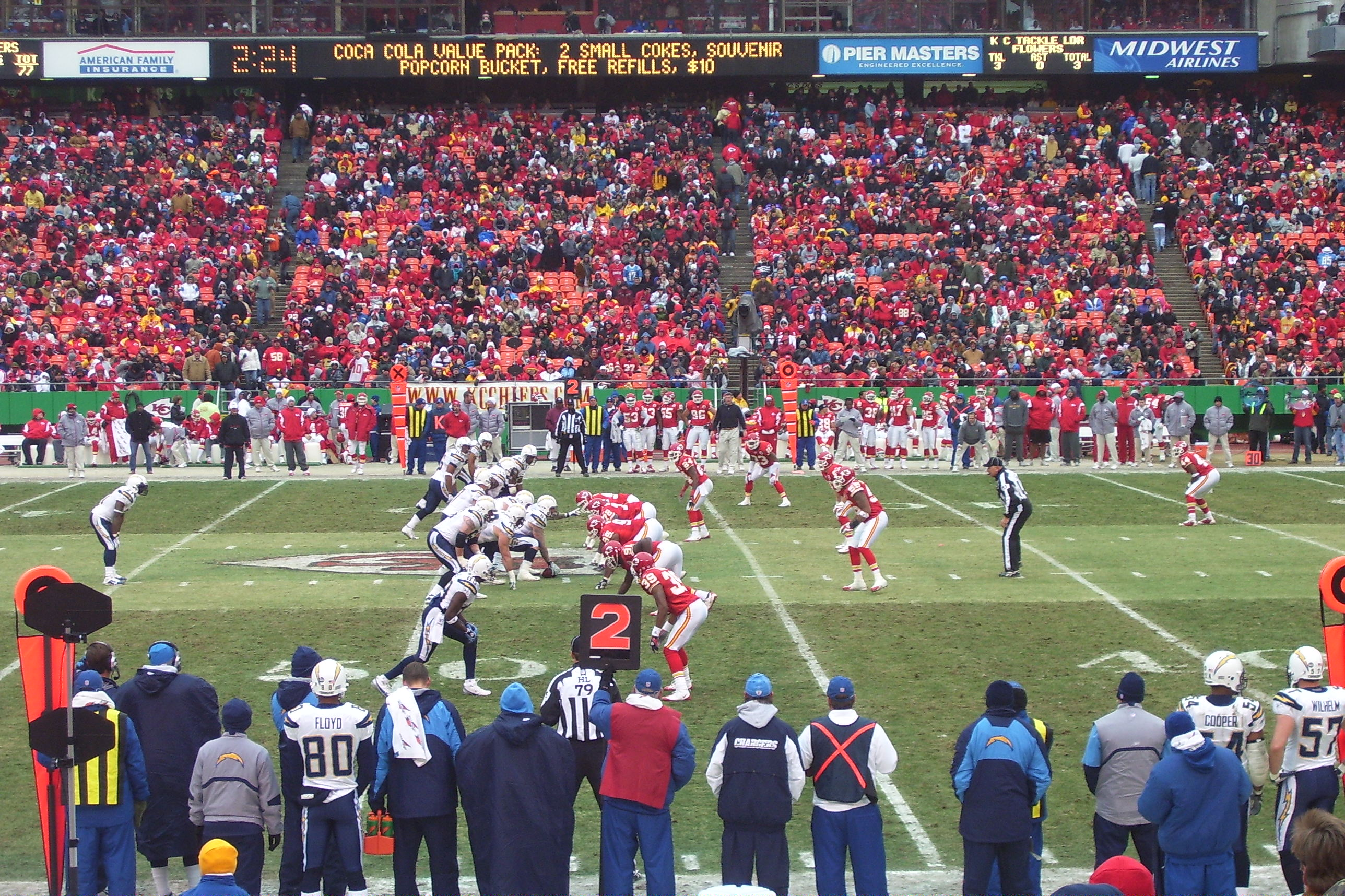
The Chiefs’ defense takes on the Chargers offense

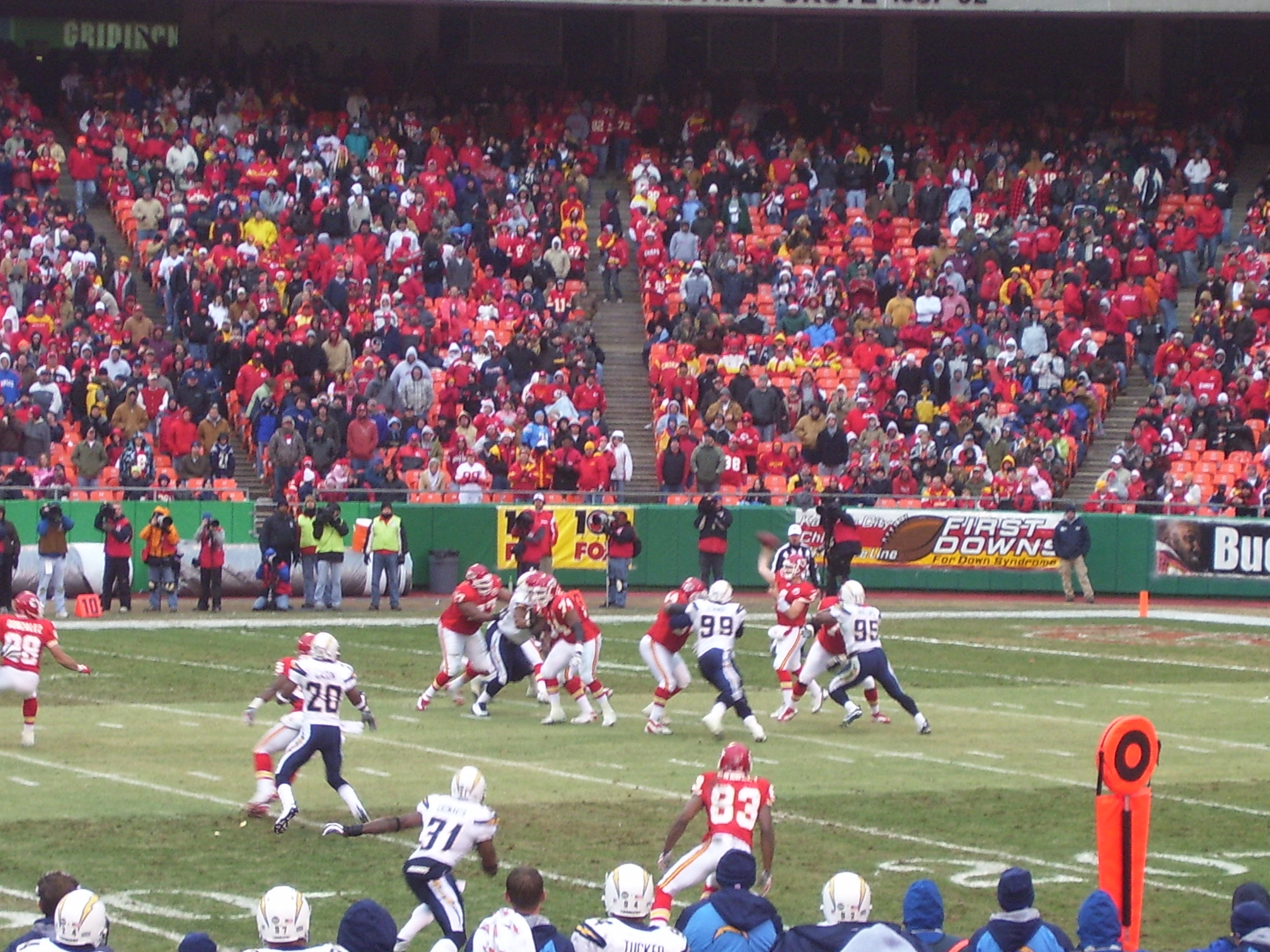
A passing play by Kansas City

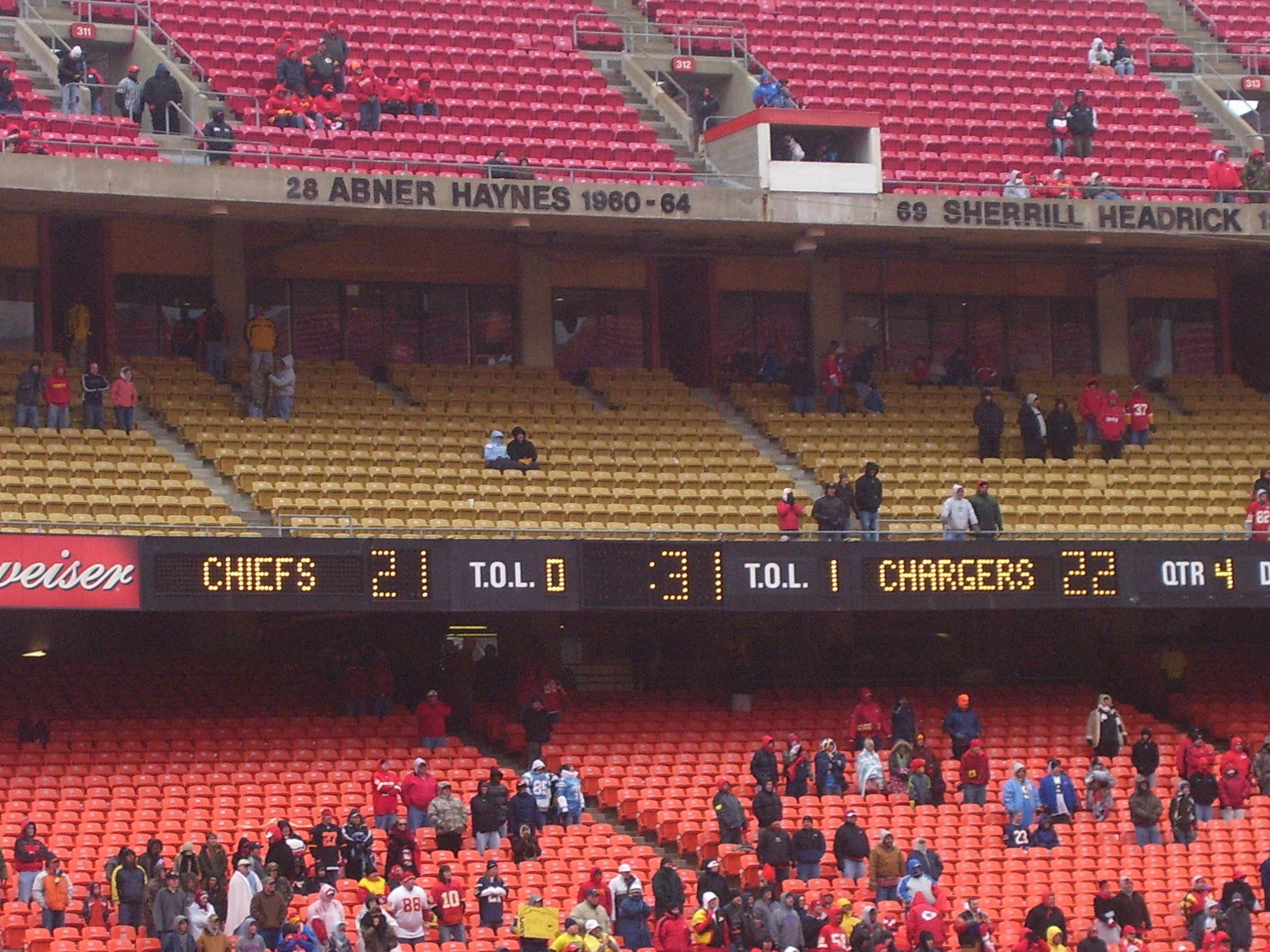
Empty seats at Arrowhead Stadium

==== Week 16: at Tampa Bay Buccaneers ====
Week 16: San Diego Chargers at Tampa Bay Buccaneers

| Quarter | 1 | 2 | 3 | 4 | Total |
|---|---|---|---|---|---|
| **Chargers** | 7 | 13 | 0 | 21 | **41** |
| Buccaneers | 7 | 3 | 14 | 0 | **24** |

at Raymond James Stadium, Tampa, Florida

- Date: December 21
- Game time: 1:00 p.m. EST
- Game weather: 72 °F (22 °C), relative humidity 82%, wind 10 mph
- Game attendance: 64,778
- Referee: Peter Morelli
- TV announcers (CBS): Greg Gumbel & Dan Dierdorf
- Box score

Game information

**First quarter**

- SDG – Brandon Manumaleuna 11-yard pass from Philip Rivers (Nate Kaeding kick), 5:04. Chargers 7–0. **Drive: 8 plays, 59 yards, 3:56.**
- TB – B. J. Askew 1-yard run (Matt Bryant kick), 2:39. Tied 7–7. **Drive: 4 plays, 11 yards, 2:25.**

**Second quarter**

- SDG – Antonio Gates 15-yard pass from Philip Rivers (Nate Kaeding kick), 13:26. Chargers 14–7. **Drive: 7 plays, 69 yards, 4:13.**
- SDG – Nate Kaeding 28-yard field goal, 5:32. Chargers 17–7. **Drive: 12 plays, 75 yards, 6:13.**
- TB – Matt Bryant 49-yard field goal, 0:17. Chargers 17–10. **Drive: 8 plays, 49 yards, 1:39.**
- SDG – Nate Kaeding 57-yard field goal, 0:00. Chargers 20–10. **Drive: 2 plays, 25 yards, 0:17.**

**Third quarter**

- TB – Jeff Garcia 7-yard run (Matt Bryant kick), 7:41. Chargers 20–17. **Drive: 13 plays, 78 yards, 7:19.**
- TB – Antonio Bryant 71-yard pass from Jeff Garcia (Matt Bryant kick), 5:05. Buccaneers 24–20. **Drive: 3 plays, 82 yards, 1:15.**

**Fourth quarter**

- SDG – Antonio Gates 5-yard pass from Philip Rivers (Nate Kaeding kick), 14:53. Chargers 27–24. **Drive: 11 plays, 63 yards, 5:12.**
- SDG – Darren Sproles 32-yard pass from Philip Rivers (Nate Kaeding kick), 7:18. Chargers 34–24. **Drive: 4 plays, 46 yards, 2:06.**
- SDG – Antoine Cason 59-yard interception return (Nate Kaeding kick), 3:00. Chargers 41–24.

**Top passers**

- SDG – Philip Rivers – 21/31, 287 yards, 4 TD
- TB – Jeff Garcia – 21/34, 232 yards, TD, 2 INT

**Top rushers**

- SDG – LaDainian Tomlinson – 21 rushes, 90 yards
- TB – Jeff Garcia – 6 rushes, 45 yards, TD

**Top receivers**

- SDG – Vincent Jackson – 7 receptions, 111 yards
- TB – Antonio Bryant – 6 receptions, 127 yards, TD

Coming off their season-sweep of the Chiefs, the Chargers flew to Raymond James Stadium for a Week 16 interconference duel with the Tampa Bay Buccaneers. In the first quarter, San Diego struck first as quarterback Philip Rivers completed an 11-yard touchdown pass to tight end Brandon Manumaleuna. The Buccaneers would respond with fullback B.J. Askew getting a 1-yard touchdown run. The Chargers would answer in the second quarter Rivers completing a 15-yard touchdown pass to tight end Antonio Gates, followed by kicker Nate Kaeding getting a 28-yard field goal. Tampa Bay would answer with kicker Matt Bryant getting a 49-yard field goal. San Diego would close out the first half with Kaeding's 57-yard field goal.

The Buccaneers would take the lead in the third quarter with quarterback Jeff Garcia getting a 7-yard touchdown run and completing a 71-yard touchdown pass to wide receiver Antonio Bryant. Afterwards, in the fourth quarter, the Chargers rallied to victory with Rivers completing a 5-yard touchdown pass to Gates and a 32-yard touchdown pass to running back Darren Sproles, followed by cornerback Antoine Cason returning an interception 59 yards for a touchdown.

==== Week 17: vs. Denver Broncos ====
Week 17: Denver Broncos at San Diego Chargers

| Quarter | 1 | 2 | 3 | 4 | Total |
|---|---|---|---|---|---|
| Broncos | 6 | 0 | 7 | 8 | **21** |
| **Chargers** | 10 | 14 | 14 | 14 | **52** |

at Qualcomm Stadium, San Diego, California

- Date: December 28
- Game time: 5:23 p.m. PDT
- Game weather: 58 °F (14 °C), relative humidity 46%, wind 8 mph
- Game attendance: 69,131
- Referee: John Parry
- TV announcers (NBC): Al Michaels, John Madden, and Andrea Kremer
- Box score

Game information

**First quarter**

- SDG – Nate Kaeding 28-yard field goal, 11:41. Chargers 3–0. **Drive: 6 plays, 60 yards, 3:19.**
- DEN – Tatum Bell 26-yard run (kick failed), 7:36. Broncos 6–3. **Drive: 10 plays, 73 yards, 4:05.**
- SDG – LaDainian Tomlinson 1-yard run (Nate Kaeding kick), 2:52. Chargers 10–6. **Drive: 8 plays, 73 yards, 4:44.**

**Second quarter**

- SDG – Brandon Manumaleuna 12-yard pass from Philip Rivers (Nate Kaeding kick), 11:30. Chargers 17–6. **Drive: 8 plays, 72 yards, 4:12.**
- SDG – LaDainian Tomlinson 4-yard run (Nate Kaeding kick), 3:32. Chargers 24–6. **Drive: 9 plays, 58 yards, 6:10.**

**Third quarter**

- DEN – Tatum Bell 37-yard run (Matt Prater kick), 12:47. Chargers 24–13. **Drive: 5 plays, 73 yards, 2:13.**
- SDG – Darren Sproles 13-yard pass from Philip Rivers (Nate Kaeding kick), 9:59. Chargers 31–13. **Drive: 5 plays, 69 yards, 2:48.**
- SDG – LaDainian Tomlinson 14-yard run (Nate Kaeding kick), 9:41. Chargers 38–13. **Drive: 1 play, 14 yards, 0:07.**

**Fourth quarter**

- DEN – Tony Scheffler 25-yard pass from Jay Cutler (Jay Cutler run), 13:01. Chargers 38–21. **Drive: 7 plays, 75 yards, 2:49.**
- SDG – Darren Sproles 2-yard run (Nate Kaeding kick), 9:47. Chargers 45–21. **Drive: 6 plays, 66 yards, 3:14.**
- SDG – Jacob Hester 4-yard run (Nate Kaeding kick), 1:15. Chargers 52–21. **Drive: 11 plays, 70 yards, 7:03.**

**Top passers**

- DEN – Jay Cutler – 33/49, 316 yards, TD, 2 INT
- SDG – Philip Rivers – 15/20, 207 yards, 2 TD, 2 INT

**Top rushers**

- DEN – Tatum Bell – 8 rushes, 86 yards, 2 TD
- SDG – Darren Sproles – 14 rushes, 115 yards, TD

**Top receivers**

- DEN – Eddie Royal – 11 receptions, 76 yards
- SDG – Chris Chambers – 3 receptions, 50 yards

Coming off their road win over the Buccaneers, the Chargers went home for a crucial Week 17 AFC West rematch with the Denver Broncos, with the division crown on the line.

In the first quarter, San Diego struck first as kicker Nate Kaeding got a 28-yard field goal. The Broncos would respond with running back Tatum Bell getting a 26-yard touchdown run (with a failed PAT), yet the Chargers answered with running back LaDainian Tomlinson’s 1-yard touchdown run. In the second quarter, San Diego would jump out to a big lead as quarterback Philip Rivers completed a 12-yard touchdown pass to tight end Brandon Manumaleuna, followed by Tomlinson's 4-yard touchdown run.

Denver would try to rally in the third quarter as Bell got a 37-yard touchdown run, yet the Chargers struck back with Rivers completing a 13-yard touchdown pass to running back Darren Sproles, followed by a 14-yard touchdown run by Tomlinson. The Broncos would try to make a comeback in the fourth quarter as quarterback Jay Cutler completed a 25-yard touchdown pass to tight end Tony Scheffler (followed by Cutler's 2-point conversion run), yet San Diego pulled away with Sproles’ 2-yard touchdown run and ending with rookie fullback Jacob Hester’s 4-yard touchdown run.

With the win, not only did the Chargers finish their season at 8–8, but they also won the AFC West title and clinched the AFC's #4 seed.

== Standings ==
AFC West
| | W | L | T | PCT | DIV | CONF | PF | PA | STK |
|---|---|---|---|---|---|---|---|---|---|
| ^{(4)} San Diego Chargers | 8 | 8 | 0 | .500 | 5–1 | 7–5 | 439 | 347 | W4 |
| Denver Broncos | 8 | 8 | 0 | .500 | 3–3 | 5–7 | 370 | 448 | L3 |
| Oakland Raiders | 5 | 11 | 0 | .313 | 2–4 | 4–8 | 263 | 388 | W2 |
| Kansas City Chiefs | 2 | 14 | 0 | .125 | 2–4 | 2–10 | 291 | 440 | L4 |

=== Conference standings ===
AFC
| # | Team | Division | W | L | T | PCT | DIV | CONF | SOS | SOV | STK |
|---|---|---|---|---|---|---|---|---|---|---|---|
Division leaders
| 1 | Tennessee Titans | South | 13 | 3 | 0 | .813 | 4–2 | 9–3 | .459 | .425 | L1 |
| 2 | Pittsburgh Steelers | North | 12 | 4 | 0 | .750 | 6–0 | 10–2 | .525 | .458 | W1 |
| 3 (Note: Miami finished ahead of New England in the AFC East based on better conference record.) | Miami Dolphins | East | 11 | 5 | 0 | .688 | 4–2 | 8–4 | .461 | .398 | W5 |
| 4 (Note: San Diego finished ahead of Denver in the AFC West based on better division record.) | San Diego Chargers | West | 8 | 8 | 0 | .500 | 5–1 | 7–5 | .516 | .398 | W4 |
Wild Cards
| 5 | Indianapolis Colts | South | 12 | 4 | 0 | .750 | 4–2 | 10–2 | .498 | .492 | W9 |
| 6 (Note: Baltimore clinched the AFC #6 seed over New England based on better conference record.) | Baltimore Ravens | North | 11 | 5 | 0 | .688 | 4–2 | 8–4 | .521 | .412 | W2 |
Did not qualify for the postseason
| 7 | New England Patriots | East | 11 | 5 | 0 | .688 | 4–2 | 7–5 | .480 | .403 | W4 |
| 8 | New York Jets | East | 9 | 7 | 0 | .563 | 4–2 | 7–5 | .471 | .462 | L2 |
| 9 (Note: Houston finished ahead of Denver based on better winning percentage vs. common opponents (3–2 against 2–3 vs. Miami, Oakland, Jacksonville and Cleveland).) | Houston Texans | South | 8 | 8 | 0 | .500 | 2–4 | 5–7 | .518 | .410 | W1 |
| 10 | Denver Broncos | West | 8 | 8 | 0 | .500 | 3–3 | 5–7 | .457 | .438 | L3 |
| 11 | Buffalo Bills | East | 7 | 9 | 0 | .438 | 0–6 | 5–7 | .453 | .304 | L1 |
| 12 (Note: Oakland finished ahead of Jacksonville based on better conference record.) | Oakland Raiders | West | 5 | 11 | 0 | .313 | 2–4 | 4–8 | .520 | .450 | W2 |
| 13 | Jacksonville Jaguars | South | 5 | 11 | 0 | .313 | 2–4 | 3–9 | .537 | .425 | L2 |
| 14 | Cincinnati Bengals | North | 4 | 11 | 1 | .281 | 1–5 | 3–9 | .553 | .297 | W3 |
| 15 | Cleveland Browns | North | 4 | 12 | 0 | .250 | 1–5 | 3–9 | .572 | .445 | L6 |
| 16 | Kansas City Chiefs | West | 2 | 14 | 0 | .125 | 2–4 | 2–10 | .537 | .406 | L4 |
Tiebreakers (Note: When breaking ties for three or more teams under the NFL's rules, they are first broken within divisions, then comparing only the highest ranked remaining team from each division.)

== Postseason ==
| Round | Date | Opponent (seed) | Result | Record | Venue | Recap |
|---|---|---|---|---|---|---|
| Wild Card | January 3, 2009 | Indianapolis Colts (5) | W 23–17 (OT) | 1–0 | Qualcomm Stadium | Recap |
| Divisional | January 11, 2009 | at Pittsburgh Steelers (2) | L 24–35 | 1–1 | Heinz Field | Recap |

=== Game summaries ===
==== AFC Wild Card Playoffs: vs. (5) Indianapolis Colts ====
AFC Wild Card Playoffs: (5) Indianapolis Colts at (4) San Diego Chargers – Game summary

| Quarter | 1 | 2 | 3 | 4 | OT | Total |
|---|---|---|---|---|---|---|
| Colts | 7 | 3 | 7 | 0 | 0 | 17 |
| Chargers | 0 | 14 | 0 | 3 | 6 | 23 |

at Qualcomm Stadium, San Diego, California

- Date: January 3
- Game time: 5:08 p.m. PST
- Game weather: 53 °F (12 °C), relative humidity 77%, wind 8 miles per hour (13 km/h; 7.0 kn)
- Game attendance: 68,082
- Referee: Ron Winter
- TV announcers (NBC): Al Michaels, John Madden, and Andrea Kremer
- Box score

Game information

First quarter

- IND – Joseph Addai 1-yard run (Adam Vinatieri kick), 2:59. Colts 7–0. Drive: 9 plays, 81 yards, 5:02.

Second quarter

- SDG – LaDainian Tomlinson 3-yard run (Nate Kaeding kick), 10:15. Tied 7–7. Drive: 4 plays, 44 yards, 2:18.
- IND – Adam Vinatieri 43-yard field goal, 6:46. Colts 10–7. Drive: 8 plays, 42 yards, 3:29.
- SDG – Darren Sproles 9-yard run (Nate Kaeding kick), 0:42. Chargers 14–10. Drive: 6 plays, 45 yards, 2:19.

Third quarter

- IND – Reggie Wayne 72-yard pass from Peyton Manning (Adam Vinatieri kick), 8:10. Colts 17–14. Drive: 5 plays, 91 yards, 1:32.

Fourth quarter

- SDG – Nate Kaeding 26-yard field goal, 0:31. Tied 17–17. Drive: 7 plays, 30 yards, 1:15.

Overtime

- SDG – Darren Sproles 22-yard run, 8:40. Chargers 23–17. Drive: 11 plays, 75 yards, 6:20.

Top passers

- IND – Peyton Manning – 25/42, 310 yards, TD
- SDG – Philip Rivers – 20/36, 217 yards, INT

Top rushers

- IND – Joseph Addai – 16 rushes, 44 yards, TD
- SDG – Darren Sproles – 22 rushes, 105 yards, 2 TD

Top receivers

- IND – Reggie Wayne – 4 receptions, 129 yards, TD
- SDG – Antonio Gates – 8 receptions, 87 yards

Entering the postseason as the AFC's fourth seed, the Chargers began their playoff run at home in the AFC Wild Card round against the #5 Indianapolis Colts, in a rematch of their Week 12 contest. San Diego trailed in the first quarter after Colts running back Joseph Addai got a 1-yard touchdown run. The Chargers responded in the second quarter as running back LaDainian Tomlinson got a 3-yard touchdown run. Indianapolis answered with a 43-yard field goal from kicker Adam Vinatieri, yet San Diego got the halftime lead with running back Darren Sproles' 9-yard touchdown run.

The Colts took the lead in the third quarter when quarterback Peyton Manning hiked the ball while the Chargers weren't paying attention and completed a 72-yard touchdown pass to wide receiver Reggie Wayne, but then San Diego tied the game in the fourth quarter as kicker Nate Kaeding nailed a 26-yard field goal. In overtime, the Chargers delivered the final strike as Sproles got the game-winning 22-yard touchdown run. Chargers go to the Divisional Round but lost to the Steelers 35-24.

==== AFC Divisional Playoffs: at (2) Pittsburgh Steelers ====
AFC Divisional Playoffs: (4) San Diego Chargers at (2) Pittsburgh Steelers – Game summary

| Quarter | 1 | 2 | 3 | 4 | Total |
|---|---|---|---|---|---|
| Chargers | 7 | 3 | 0 | 14 | 24 |
| Steelers | 7 | 7 | 7 | 14 | 35 |

at Heinz Field, Pittsburgh

- Date: January 11
- Game time: 4:45 p.m. EST
- Game weather: 26 °F (−3 °C) (Light Snow)
- Game attendance: 63,899
- Referee: Bill Leavy
- TV announcers (CBS): Jim Nantz and Phil Simms
- Box score

Game information

First quarter

- SDG – Vincent Jackson 41-yard pass from Philip Rivers (Nate Kaeding kick), 12:59. Chargers 7–0. Drive: 4 plays, 75 yards, 2:01.
- PIT – Santonio Holmes 67-yard punt return (Jeff Reed kick), 7:41. Tied 7–7.

Second quarter

- SDG – Nate Kaeding 42-yard field goal, 1:56. Chargers 10–7. Drive: 7 plays, 20 yards, 3:09.
- PIT – Willie Parker 3-yard run (Jeff Reed kick), 0:40. Steelers 14–10. Drive: 7 plays, 66 yards, 1:16.

Third quarter

- PIT – Heath Miller 8-yard pass from Ben Roethlisberger (Jeff Reed kick), 7:04. Steelers 21–10. Drive: 13 plays, 77 yards, 7:56.

Fourth quarter

- PIT – Gary Russell 1-yard run (Jeff Reed kick), 12:52. Steelers 28–10. Drive: 2 plays, 49 yards, 0:49.
- SDG – Legedu Naanee 4-yard pass from Philip Rivers (Nate Kaeding kick), 9:09. Steelers 28–17. Drive: 10 plays, 73 yards, 3:43.
- PIT – Willie Parker 16-yard run (Jeff Reed kick), 4:11. Steelers 35–17. Drive: 9 plays, 73 yards, 4:58.
- SDG – Darren Sproles 62-yard pass from Philip Rivers (Nate Kaeding kick), 1:53. Steelers 35–24. Drive: 4 plays, 79 yards, 0:50.

Top passers

- SDG – Philip Rivers – 21/35, 308 yards, 3 TD, INT
- PIT – Ben Roethlisberger – 17/26, 181 yards, TD

Top rushers

- SDG – Darren Sproles – 11 rushes, 15 yards
- PIT – Willie Parker – 27 rushes, 146 yards, 2 TD

Top receivers

- SDG – Darren Sproles – 5 receptions, 91 yards, TD
- PIT – Hines Ward – 4 receptions, 70 yards

Coming off their impressive wild card home win over the Colts, the Chargers flew to Heinz Field for their AFC Divisional round duel with the #2 Pittsburgh Steelers, in a rematch of their Week 11 contest.

San Diego got off to a fast start in the first quarter as quarterback Philip Rivers completed a 41-yard touchdown pass to wide receiver Vincent Jackson. The Steelers responded with wide receiver Santonio Holmes returning a punt 67 yards for a touchdown. The Chargers answered in the second quarter as kicker Nate Kaeding got a 42-yard field goal, but Pittsburgh struck back with running back Willie Parker’s 3-yard touchdown run.

The Steelers would add to their lead in the third quarter as quarterback Ben Roethlisberger completed an 8-yard touchdown pass to tight end Heath Miller. The San Diego Chargers ran exactly one offensive play in the third quarter, which resulted in a Philip Rivers interception off a deflection. In the fourth quarter, San Diego tried to rally as Rivers completed a 4-yard touchdown pass to wide receiver Legedu Naanee, but Pittsburgh answered with Parker's 16-yard touchdown run. The Chargers tried to come back as Rivers completed a 62-yard touchdown pass to running back Darren Sproles, but San Diego's onside kick attempt failed, allowing the Steelers to seal the win.

== Awards ==
Kris Dielman and Antonio Gates were the only Chargers in the AFC Pro Bowl squad, both qualifying as starters; Dielman was also named second-team All-Pro by the Associated Press. Rivers was a runner-up for various Associated Press honors, picking up two votes for Most Valuable Player, six for Offensive Player of the Year and one for Comeback Player of the Year (each of these awards had fifty total available votes).
