= South Sumter High School =

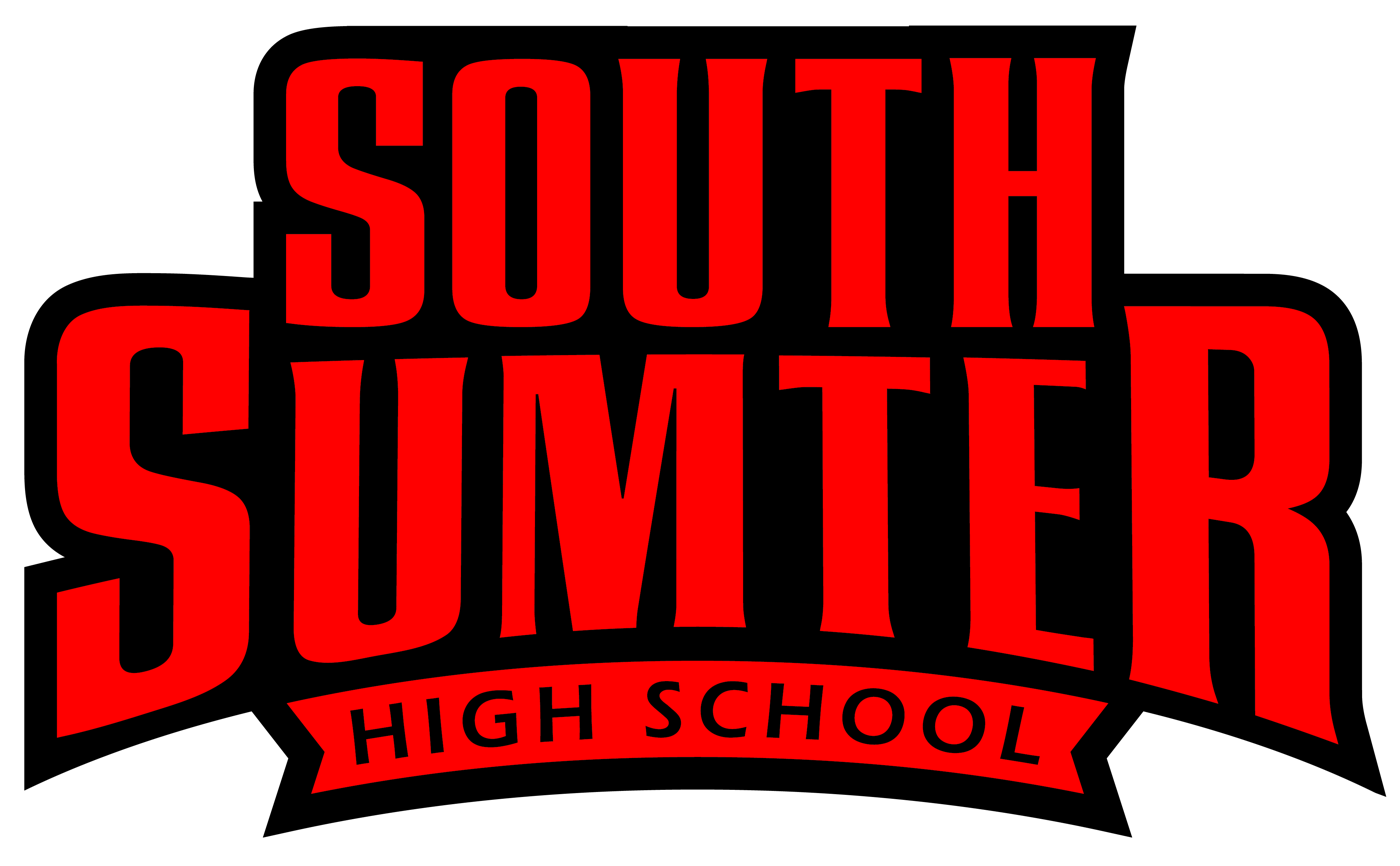

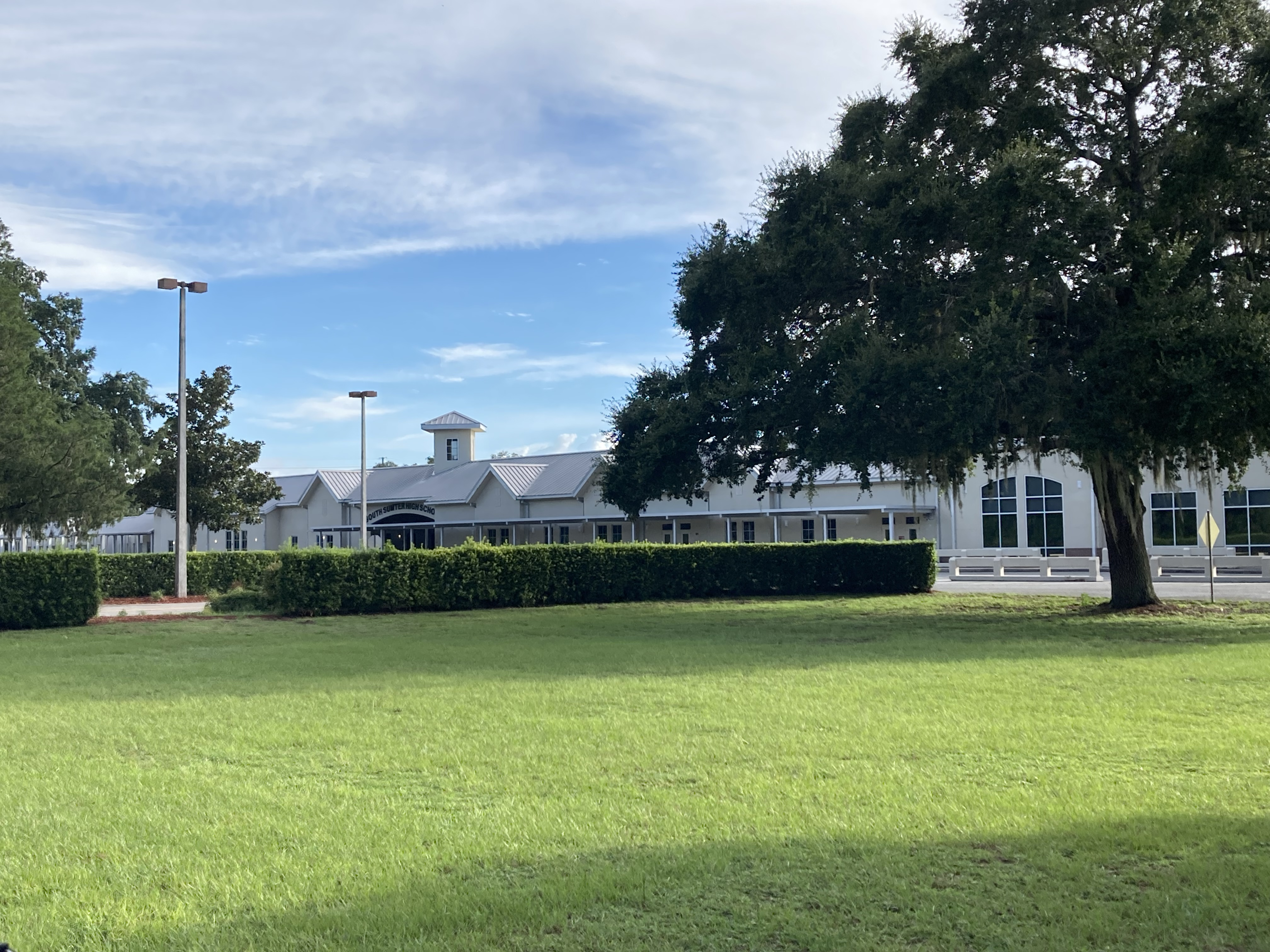

Location
- 706 N. Main St; Bushnell, Sumter, Florida 33513; United States
- Coordinates: 28.672589°N 82.113542°W

Information
- School type: Public high school
- Motto: Tradition Never Graduates
- Founded: 1919: as Bushnell High School. 1959: as South Sumter High School
- School district: Sumter District Schools
- CEEB code: 100195
- Principal: Allen Shirley (2020 - present)
- Grades: 9–12
- Enrollment: 1,045 (2022-2023)
- Color
- Slogan: Raiders Achieve What They Believe, Tradition Never Graduates
- Athletics conference: 4A
- Team name: Raiders
- Rival: Wildwood Middle-High School, The Villages Charter High School
- Accreditation: Florida Dept of Education
- Website: https://www.ssh.sumter.k12.fl.us/

South Sumter High School is a public high school in Bushnell, Sumter County, Florida. Its teams are the Raiders and its school colors are Red, Black and White.

== Athletics ==
South Sumter Raiders have had one of the longest winning high school football teams in Florida since 2000, and earned the top ranking in Division 4A in a 2012 Associated Press poll. The team won their division and were 11–1 overall in 2012. Dallas Cowboys Linebacker Keanu Neal played for the Raiders.

Other competition sports include: Baseball, Basketball, Golf, Soccer, Softball, Track, Volleyball and Weightlifting.

== Notable alumni ==
- Keanu Neal - Current NFL player for the Tampa Bay Buccaneers
- Clinton Hart - Former NFL player for the Philadelphia Eagles, San Diego Chargers, and St. Louis Rams
- Earl Everett- Former Florida Gators football linebacker and Former NFL player
