= Clinton Hart =

American football player (born 1977)

No. 33, 42
- Position: Safety

Personal information
- Born: July 20, 1977 (age 49); Dade City, Florida, U.S.
- Listed height: 6 ft 0 in (1.83 m)
- Listed weight: 208 lb (94 kg)

Career information
- High school: South Sumter (Bushnell, Florida)
- College: College of Central Florida
- NFL draft: 2000: undrafted

Career history
- Tallahassee Thunder (2000); Tampa Bay Storm (2001); Philadelphia Eagles (2002–2004); → Rhein Fire (2002); → Amsterdam Admirals (2002); San Diego Chargers (2004–2009); St. Louis Rams (2009); Omaha Nighthawks (2010–2011)

Career NFL statistics
- Games played: 99
- Total tackles: 341
- Sacks: 2
- Forced fumbles: 2
- Fumble recoveries: 7
- Interceptions: 10
- Defensive touchdowns: 2
- Stats at Pro Football Reference

Clinton Glenn Hart (born July 20, 1977) is an American former professional football player who was a safety in the National Football League (NFL) for the Philadelphia Eagles, San Diego Chargers, and St. Louis Rams. He also was a member of the Tallahassee Thunder, Tampa Bay Storm, Rhein Fire, Amsterdam Admirals and Omaha Nighthawks of the United Football League (UFL). He played college baseball at Central Florida.

== Early life ==
Hart attended South Sumter, where he practiced football and baseball. In football, he was the team's starter at quarterback and safety.

Because of his SAT low score, he didn't receive football college scholarships offers except for an interest to play college football at Central Florida, he turned it downed instead deciding to play baseball at Central Florida. He did not play college football. He was selected by the Anaheim Angels in the 32nd round of the 2000 Major League Baseball draft.

== Professional career ==
=== Tampa Bay Storm ===
After spending the 2000 season with the Tallahassee Thunder of the af2, Hart played defensive back and wide receiver for the Tampa Bay Storm of Arena Football League in 2001. He finished his only season in the AFL recording three interceptions and 69 tackles on defense and 24 receptions for 242 yards and touchdown on offense.

=== Philadelphia Eagles ===
After success in the AFL, the Philadelphia Eagles signed Hart to a contract in 2002 and allocated him to NFL Europe, where he played for the Rhein Fire and Amsterdam Admirals. He spent the final six weeks of the season on the Eagles practice squad.

In 2003, Hart was able to make the roster and started 9 games at safety due to an injury to starter Brian Dawkins. On September 14, 2004, the Eagles waived him.

=== San Diego Chargers ===
On September 15, 2004, Hart was claimed off waivers by the San Diego Chargers. Hart played in 14 games for the Chargers in 2004 and was tied with Hanik Milligan for the team lead with in special teams tackles with 15.

In 2005, Hart started 5 of 16 games and recorded 45 tackles and an interception. He also scored two touchdowns on an interception return and an interception by Donnie Edwards who lateralled to him for the score. In 2006, he started one of 16 games, recording 48 tackles and three interceptions.

In 2007, Hart became the Chargers full-time starter at strong safety, starting all 16 games. He finished the season recording a career-high five interceptions and 85 tackles.

On April 7, 2008, the Chargers signed Hart to a five-year extension through 2012. During the 2008 season, he remained the Chargers starter at strong safety, starting in all 14 games he played. He finished the season with 63 tackles and 0 interceptions.

Hart was cut from the Chargers on October 14, 2009.

=== St. Louis Rams ===
Hart was signed by the St. Louis Rams on December 8, 2009. He wasn't re-signed after the season.

== NFL career statistics ==
Legend
	Led the league
**Bold**	Career high

=== Regular season ===
Year	Team	Games		Tackles					Interceptions					Fumbles			
Year	Team	GP	GS	Cmb	Solo	Ast	Sck	TFL	Int	Yds	TD	Lng	PD	FF	FR	Yds	TD
2003	PHI	**16**	9	57	47	10	**1.0**	2	0	0	0	0	5	0	1	0	0
2004	SD	14	0	24	18	6	0.0	0	1	13	0	13	2	0	0	0	0
2005	SD	**16**	5	46	34	12	0.0	0	1	**110**	**2**	**70**	6	**1**	**2**	-1	0
2006	SD	**16**	1	49	40	9	0.0	1	3	37	0	22	8	**1**	1	0	0
2007	SD	**16**	**16**	**85**	**68**	17	**1.0**	**5**	**5**	73	0	22	**9**	0	1	0	0
2008	SD	14	14	63	45	**18**	0.0	1	0	0	0	0	8	0	**2**	0	0
2009	SD	4	3	16	11	5	0.0	0	0	0	0	0	0	0	0	0	0
2009	STL	3	0	1	1	0	0.0	0	0	0	0	0	0	0	0	0	0
Career		99	48	341	264	77	2.0	9	10	233	2	70	38	2	7	-1	0

=== Playoffs ===
Year	Team	Games		Tackles					Interceptions					Fumbles			
Year	Team	GP	GS	Cmb	Solo	Ast	Sck	TFL	Int	Yds	TD	Lng	PD	FF	FR	Yds	TD
2003	PHI	2	0	1	1	0	0.0	0	0	0	0	0	0	0	0	0	0
2004	SD	1	0	3	2	1	0.0	0	0	0	0	0	0	0	0	0	0
2006	SD	1	0	3	2	1	0.0	0	0	0	0	0	0	0	0	0	0
2007	SD	**3**	**3**	**17**	**12**	**5**	0.0	0	0	0	0	0	0	0	0	0	0
2008	SD	2	1	3	2	1	0.0	0	0	0	0	0	0	0	0	0	0
Career		9	4	27	19	8	0.0	0	0	0	0	0	0	0	0	0	0

== Personal life ==
On April 28, 2010, it was reported he was arrested for the battery of his wife after she discovered a female chatting with him on Facebook.

In 2017, Hart took the position of Defensive Coordinator at Ocala Christian Academy in Ocala, Florida.

His younger brother, Keanu Neal, played college football at Florida Gators football as a safety and was a 2016 NFL draft prospect selected #17 overall by the Atlanta Falcons.
