= Brandon Marshall =

American football player (born 1984)

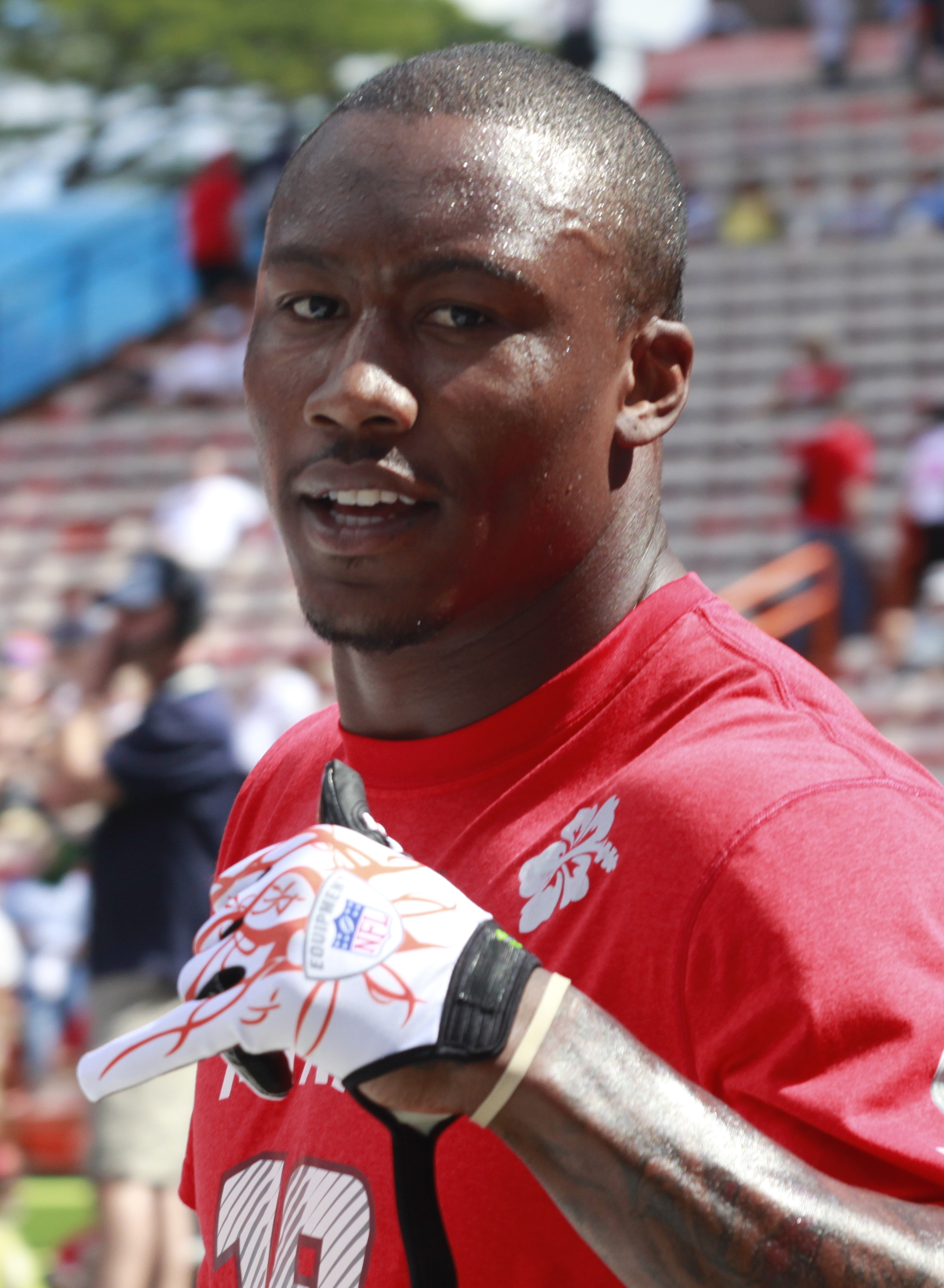
- Marshall at the 2012 Pro Bowl

No. 15, 19
- Position: Wide receiver

Personal information
- Born: March 23, 1984 (age 42); Pittsburgh, Pennsylvania, U.S.
- Listed height: 6 ft 5 in (1.96 m)
- Listed weight: 232 lb (105 kg)

Career information
- High school: Lake Howell (Winter Park, Florida)
- College: UCF (2002–2005)
- NFL draft: 2006: 4th round, 119th overall pick

Career history
- Denver Broncos (2006–2009); Miami Dolphins (2010–2011); Chicago Bears (2012–2014); New York Jets (2015–2016); New York Giants (2017); Seattle Seahawks (2018); New Orleans Saints (2018)

Awards and highlights
- First-team All-Pro (2012); Second-team All-Pro (2015); 6× Pro Bowl (2008, 2009, 2011–2013, 2015); NFL receiving touchdowns co-leader (2015); 100 greatest Bears of All-Time; Second-team All-C-USA (2005); NFL records: Most receptions in a game: 21; Most seasons with 100+ receptions: 6

Career NFL statistics
- Receptions: 970
- Receiving yards: 12,351
- Receiving touchdowns: 83
- Stats at Pro Football Reference

Brandon Tyrone Marshall (born March 23, 1984) is an American former professional football player who was a wide receiver for 13 seasons in the National Football League (NFL). He played college football for the UCF Knights, and was selected by the Denver Broncos in the fourth round of the 2006 NFL draft. Marshall has also played for the Miami Dolphins, Chicago Bears, New York Jets, New York Giants, and the Seattle Seahawks. After his retirement from the NFL, Marshall became a TV personality, and is a former co-host on FS1's morning show First Things First. Marshall currently cohosts Showtime's Inside the NFL and has been on the show for seven seasons.

During his playing career, Marshall was known for his ability to break and dodge tackles. He led all NFL wide receivers in yards after first contact for the 2007 NFL season. Regarding Marshall's breakaway ability, cornerback Brandon Flowers said, "Brandon Marshall is a defensive lineman playing wide receiver. He wants to inflict punishment on you. He wants you to try to tackle him so he can shove you off of him and get more yards." Cornerback Nnamdi Asomugha said Marshall is "the toughest guy to bring down, one-on-one." Despite Marshall's long productive career, he never played in a playoff game. His 12,351 career receiving yards are the most ever by a receiver who has never played in the postseason.

On December 13, 2009, against the Indianapolis Colts, Marshall set an NFL record for receptions in a game with 21. From 2007 to 2009, he accomplished the rare feat of catching at least 100 passes in three consecutive seasons.

== Early life ==
Marshall was born in Pittsburgh, Pennsylvania, and later lived in Georgia and Florida where he played high school football at Lake Howell High School.

Marshall was a letterman in basketball and track three times at Lake Howell. He played both offense and defense, as he earned All-State honors and was named Seminole County Utility Player of the Year. In track Marshall competed as a jumper. As a senior, he won the Class 3A state triple jump championship, landing a personal-best jump of 14.81 meters, and also placed ninth in long jump, recording a jump of 6.88 meters. As a top competitor in high jump, he cleared 1.98 meters at the 2002 FHSAA 3A District 7 Meet, placing second. Marshall was a scholar athlete at the University of Central Florida, and was selected to the All-C-USA Team.

== College career ==
A two-star prospect out of high school, he received scholarship offers from UConn and Georgia Southern, along with a preferred walk-on offer from Florida. He nearly committed to Florida, but a conversation with his father, who asked whether he truly wanted to be a Gator or preferred a place where he could play right away, led him to choose a different path. Betting on himself, Marshall rejected the preferred walk-on opportunity at Florida and accepted a full scholarship from the UCF Knights, where he was recruited by coach Sean Beckton under head coach Mike Kruczek.

At UCF, Marshall played in a total of 44 games (21 starts) at wide receiver for the Knights football team. He collected 112 receptions, 1,674 receiving yards, and 13 touchdowns in his collegiate career. As a freshman, he had a limited role and had two receptions for 18 yards and a touchdown. As a sophomore, he had 27 receptions for 363 yards and two touchdowns. As a junior, he had eight receptions for 84 yards and had an interception on defense. His best season came in 2005 as a senior. He played in 13 games and had career highs in receptions (74), receiving yards (1,195), and touchdowns (11). Marshall's best career game came in the 2005 Hawaii Bowl, where he had 11 catches for 210 yards and three touchdowns. He was named MVP of the game. For his efforts during the 2005 season, Marshall was selected to the All-C-USA second-team.

Marshall also started at safety for seven games during the 2004 season due to injuries in UCF's secondary. He made his first collegiate start at safety on October 4, 2004, against Buffalo. He recorded four tackles, including half a sack. Marshall led his entire team in tackles (51) during the 2004 season.

== Professional career ==
Pre-draft measurables
Height	Weight	Arm length	Hand span	40-yard dash	10-yard split	20-yard split	20-yard shuttle	Three-cone drill	Vertical jump	Broad jump
6 ft 4 1/2 in (1.94 m)	229 lb (104 kg)	32 5/8 in (0.83 m)	8 7/8 in (0.23 m)	4.53 s	1.62 s	2.68 s	4.31 s	6.96 s	37.0 in (0.94 m)	10 ft 0 in (3.05 m)
All values from NFL Combine, except for 20-ss and 3-cone, which are from UCF Pro Day

=== Denver Broncos ===
==== 2006 season ====
The Denver Broncos selected Marshall with the 119th overall selection in the fourth round of the 2006 NFL draft.

Before the regular season began, Marshall suffered a slight tear to his posterior cruciate ligament (PCL) in the preseason game against the Detroit Lions. Although the injury sidelined him for a couple weeks, he was able to return and play in 15 games (1 start) during the regular season. Marshall had a total of 20 catches, 309 receiving yards, and 2 touchdowns for his rookie year. On October 22, against the Cleveland Browns, he had his first professional receiving touchdown. He caught a pass in each of the Broncos' final seven games of the season, totaling 18 receptions, 287 receiving yards, and 1 touchdown over that stretch. The lone touchdown came during an NBC Sunday Night Football home game against the Seattle Seahawks on December 3, 2006. In that game, Broncos quarterback Jay Cutler (who was making his NFL regular season debut as a rookie) threw a pass to Marshall on the right side of the field. Marshall broke and spun away from three tackles on his way to a career-long 71-yard touchdown. It was the second longest rookie-to-rookie pass play in Broncos history.

==== 2007 season ====
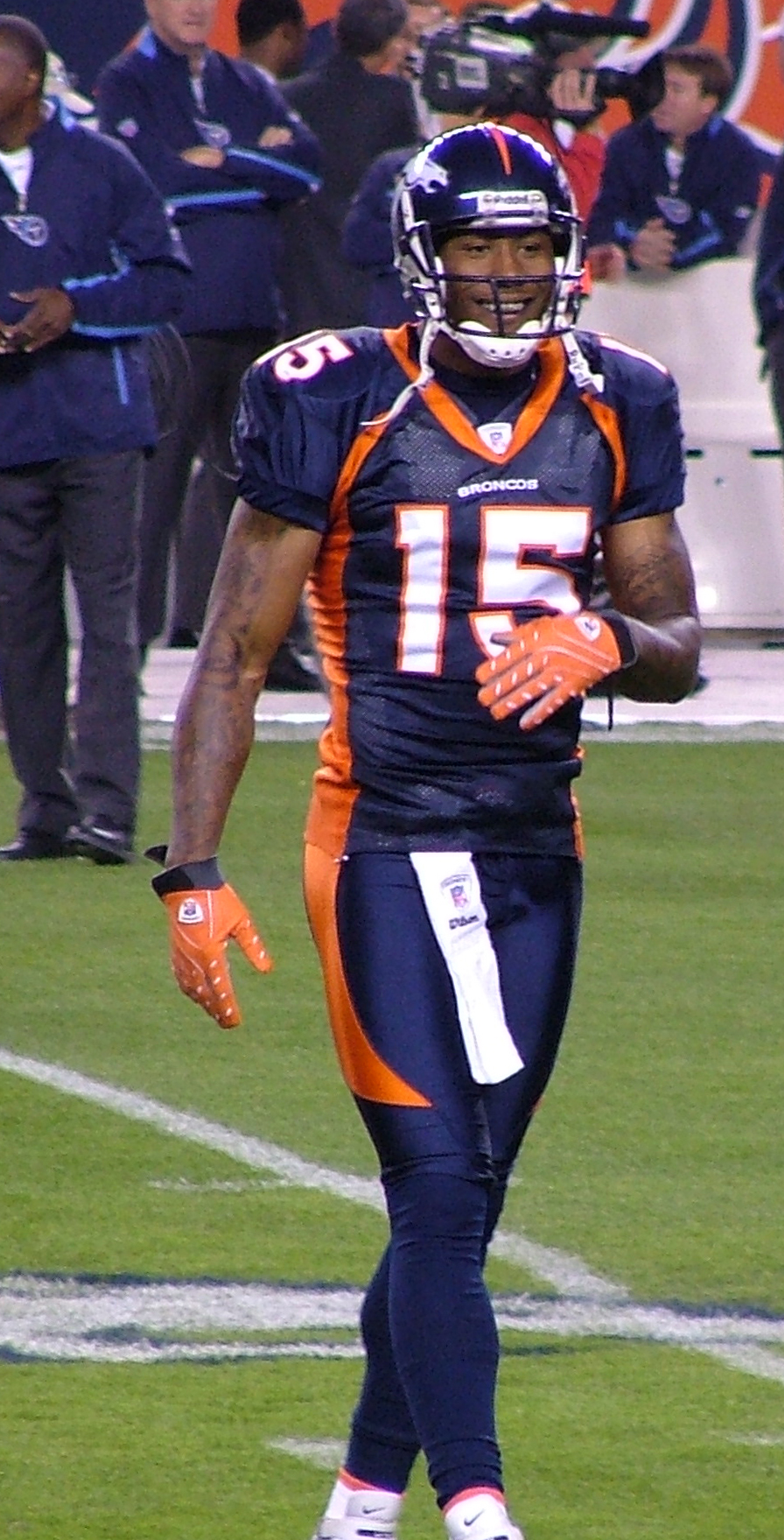
Marshall in 2007

Marshall sustained injuries before the start of the 2007 season. He suffered a groin strain that kept him out of Broncos quarterback camp and team camp during May and June. He also pulled a quadriceps femoris muscle on July 10, 2007, during Broncos mini-camp. The injury left him out for nearly all of training camp until Broncos head coach Mike Shanahan ordered him to participate for the last couple of days.

On December 13, 2007, in a Thursday night road loss against the Houston Texans, Marshall caught 11 passes for 107 yards. Nine of those receptions occurred in the first half. Marshall became the only wide receiver in Broncos history to have at least 10 receptions in two consecutive games. On Christmas Eve, 2007, in a Monday night road loss to the San Diego Chargers, Marshall caught six passes for 75 yards. On December 30, 2007, in a home win against the Minnesota Vikings, Marshall caught 10 passes for 114 yards and a touchdown. The 10 catches gave Marshall 102 total receptions for the year – his first career 100-catch season. He became only the third second-year player in NFL history to have at least 100 receptions in a season, joining Isaac Bruce and Larry Fitzgerald.

During the 2007 season, Marshall posted team-highs and career-highs in receptions (102), receiving yards (1,325) and receiving touchdowns (7). Marshall reached the 1,000-yard milestone during the 13th game of the season, which was a 41–7 home win over the Kansas City Chiefs. In the game, Marshall had 10 catches for 115 yards and two touchdowns. Among all of the wide receivers in the NFL during the season, Marshall placed fifth in receptions (102), sixth in receiving yards (1,325), second in yards after the catch (505), first in yards after first contact (319), first in number of times targeted (170) and tied for fourth in catches that led to first downs (70).

Following the 2007 season, Marshall, Cutler, and Tony Scheffler went to Atlanta, Georgia together to train and work on timing for the 2008 season.

==== 2008 season ====
On March 22, 2008, Marshall slipped on an empty McDonald's bag while wrestling with family members, and subsequently, fell through a television set at his home in Orlando, Florida – cutting his right forearm. According to Broncos head athletic trainer Steve Antonopulos, Marshall "sustained right forearm lacerations to one artery, one vein, one nerve, two tendons and three muscles." He was treated at a local hospital and later released after needing a cast and several stitches. In early April, Marshall had the cast removed from his surgically repaired right forearm and was in a sling until May. He was cleared in late-June to practice with the Broncos. He later revealed that his right hand was numb during the entire 2008 season.

===== Suspension =====
Marshall officially received a three-game suspension from the NFL on August 5, 2008, due to off-the-field legal troubles including a drunk driving charge and domestic violence arrest. He appealed the decision and won the appeal, reducing the punishment to a one-game suspension and a fine of two combined game checks, which totaled $52,353.

===== Bronco and NFL records =====
In Marshall's first game back from suspension, he caught 18 passes for 166 yards and a touchdown, in a 39–38 home victory over the San Diego Chargers. The 18 receptions were a Broncos single-game record, and tied for the second most in NFL history, trailing only Terrell Owens, who caught 20 passes for the San Francisco 49ers in a game during the 2000 NFL season. Marshall's 18 receptions gave him 55 total receptions over five games, which is an NFL record. He is the first receiver in NFL history to register at least 10 receptions in four out of five games. His performance against the Chargers also earned him AFC Offensive Player of the Week honors for the first time in his career.

====== Attempted celebration ======
Marshall received attention for an attempted touchdown celebration during the Broncos' 34–30 comeback road victory over the Cleveland Browns in a Thursday Night Football matchup on November 6, 2008. With over a minute left in the game, Marshall caught the go-ahead touchdown pass and then began to pull a glove from his pants. Denver wide receiver Brandon Stokley rushed over to Marshall to urge him to put the glove away, as it could be considered a touchdown celebration prop, which is against NFL rules (a 15-yard penalty on the kickoff could be assessed). Marshall later explained that he was intending to put on the glove (which was white with one half of it painted black) as a means to honor racial progress and unity in the United States, following the country electing Barack Obama as President two days earlier. Regarding the attempted touchdown celebration, Marshall said, "I know at the 1968 Olympics in Mexico, Tommie Smith and John Carlos raised that black glove and that fist as a silent gesture of black power and liberation. Forty years later, I wanted to make my own statement. I wanted to make my own statement and gesture to represent the progress we made." Smith and Carlos didn't initially see Marshall's attempted gesture when it happened live, but both said they appreciated and understood Marshall's intent. "He wanted to make a mark in history and feel that he was a part of the change for the better," Smith said. "He had the right idea in terms of what he was attempting to do," Carlos said.

===== Place in NFL rankings =====
On December 7, 2008, in the 13th game of the season, Marshall caught 11 passes for 91 yards and two touchdowns, as part of a 24–17 home victory over the Kansas City Chiefs. The 91 yards gave him over 1,000 receiving yards for the second consecutive season. Marshall had his second career multi-touchdown game as well; the first also occurred in a home victory over the Chiefs in the 13th game of the prior season.

Marshall finished the season ranked third among NFL wide receivers in receptions (104), seventh in receiving yards (1,265), fifth in receiving yards per game (84.3), seventh in yards after the catch (419), third in catches that led to first downs (65) and first in number of times targeted for the second consecutive season (181). The 104 catches were a career-high for Marshall and also made him only the ninth player in NFL history (second Broncos player) to have at least 100 receptions in back-to-back seasons. He finished first in fan voting for AFC wide receivers in the 2009 Pro Bowl. He received 18 more votes than Randy Moss to earn the top spot. Four wide receivers are chosen to play in the game. Fan voting accounts for one-third of the total voting (players and coaches account for the other two-thirds). He was officially picked to play in his first Pro Bowl when selections were announced on December 16, 2008. Marshall was chosen as a starter.

==== 2009 season ====
Marshall had hip surgery on March 31, 2009, to repair an aggravated hip that bothered him during the 2008 season. He returned in time for training camp in late-July; however, he didn't always fully commit to practicing. This led the Broncos to suspend him for the last two games of the preseason (he didn't play in the first two preseason contests) for conduct detrimental to the team.

In a 26–6 Thanksgiving home victory over the New York Giants, Marshall recorded six catches (including two one-handed grabs) for 86 yards. His performance earned him the Pudding Pie Award, which is given to the game's MVP by the NFL Network.

On December 13, 2009, Marshall broke Terrell Owens' record for receptions in a game with 21, as part of a 28–16 road loss to the Indianapolis Colts. Owens said, "No more deserving of a guy than he is. He's just been a hard worker....I wish him well. He's going to have a great career." Marshall became the first player since 1960 to record eight career games of at least 10 catches in his first four seasons. During the game against the Colts, he also had two touchdowns and a career-high 200 receiving yards. Marshall's performance earned him AFC Offensive Player of the Week honors for the second time in his career.

On December 27, 2009, in a 30–27 road loss to the Philadelphia Eagles, Marshall caught his 100th pass of the season. He became only the fifth player in NFL history (first Broncos player) to do so in three consecutive seasons (previously Jerry Rice, Herman Moore, Marvin Harrison, concurrently Wes Welker, and subsequently Antonio Brown). Marshall was named to his second consecutive Pro Bowl when rosters were announced on December 29.

Marshall was benched for the team's final regular season game by head coach Josh McDaniels for failing to arrive at a physical therapy session on time. The Broncos lost the regular season finale in Denver, 44–24, to the Kansas City Chiefs on January 3, 2010. They missed the playoffs for the fourth straight year. Marshall ended the season tied for third among NFL wide receivers in catches (101), tied for seventh in receiving touchdowns (10), seventh in yards after the catch (527), and fifth in number of times targeted (154).

=== Miami Dolphins ===
==== 2010 season ====
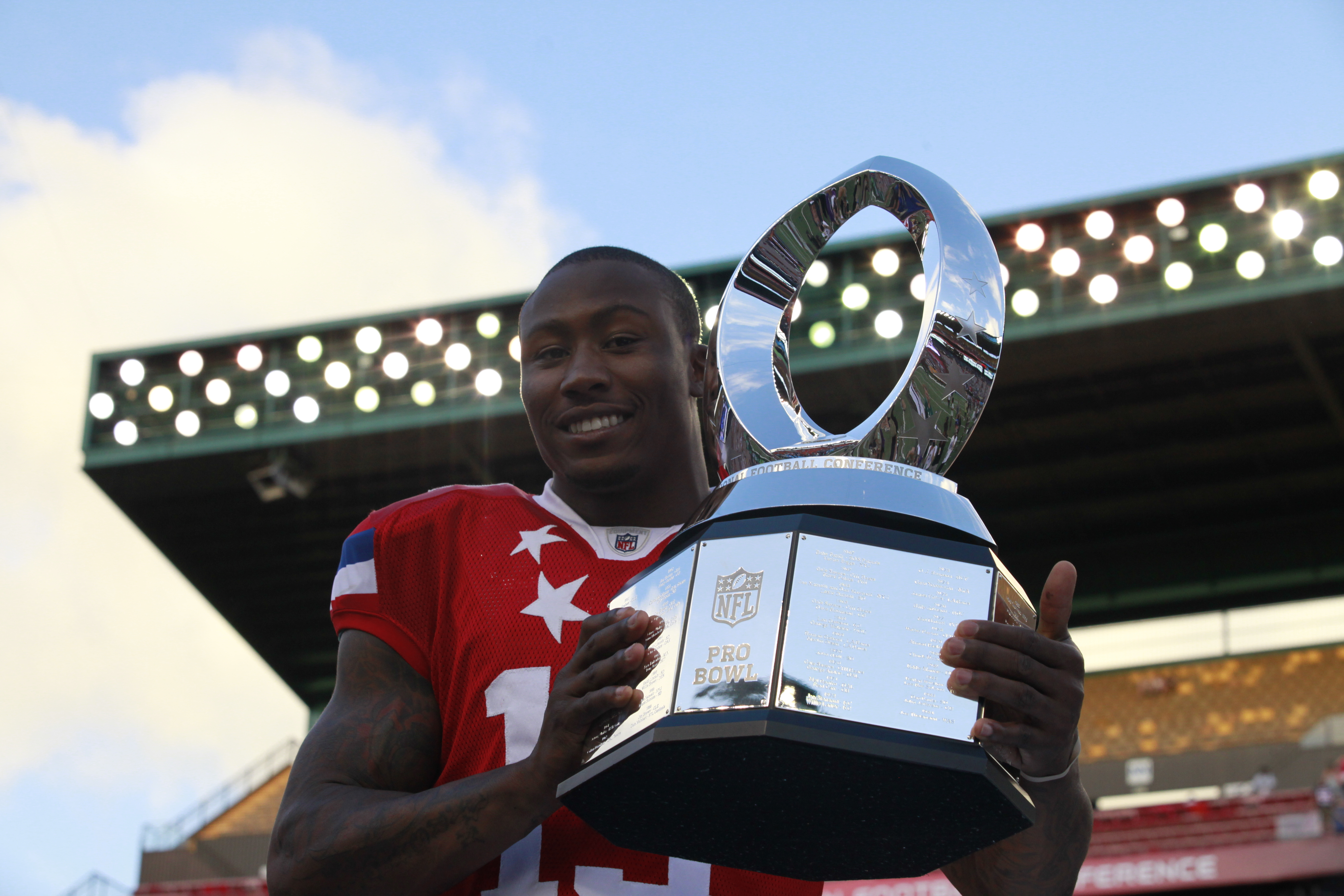
Marshall with the 2012 Pro Bowl MVP trophy.

On April 14, 2010, Marshall was traded from the Denver Broncos to the Miami Dolphins for a second round pick in the 2010 NFL draft and a second round pick in the 2011 NFL draft. On the same day, the Dolphins and Marshall agreed to a four-year, $47.5 million extension.

Marshall finished the season with 86 receptions for 1,014 yards and three touchdowns. His streak of three straight years with 100 or more receptions came to an end, but he did extend his streak of 1,000 receiving yards to four straight years. His best performances of the season occurred in Week 3 home against the New York Jets (10 receptions for 166 yards and 1 touchdown), Week 6 away against the Green Bay Packers (10 catches for 125 yards), Week 15 home against the Buffalo Bills (11 receptions for 105 yards and 1 touchdown) and Week 16 home against the Detroit Lions (10 receptions for 100 yards). He was ranked 61st by his fellow on the NFL Top 100 Players of 2011.

==== 2011 season ====
In the 2011 season, Marshall had five games with over 100 receiving yards. On the year, he caught 81 passes for 1,214 yards and six touchdowns. It was his second straight season catching 80 or more passes. In the Pro Bowl, Marshall set a Pro Bowl record by catching six passes for 176 yards and four touchdowns. He was named the game's MVP.

=== Chicago Bears ===
==== 2012 season ====
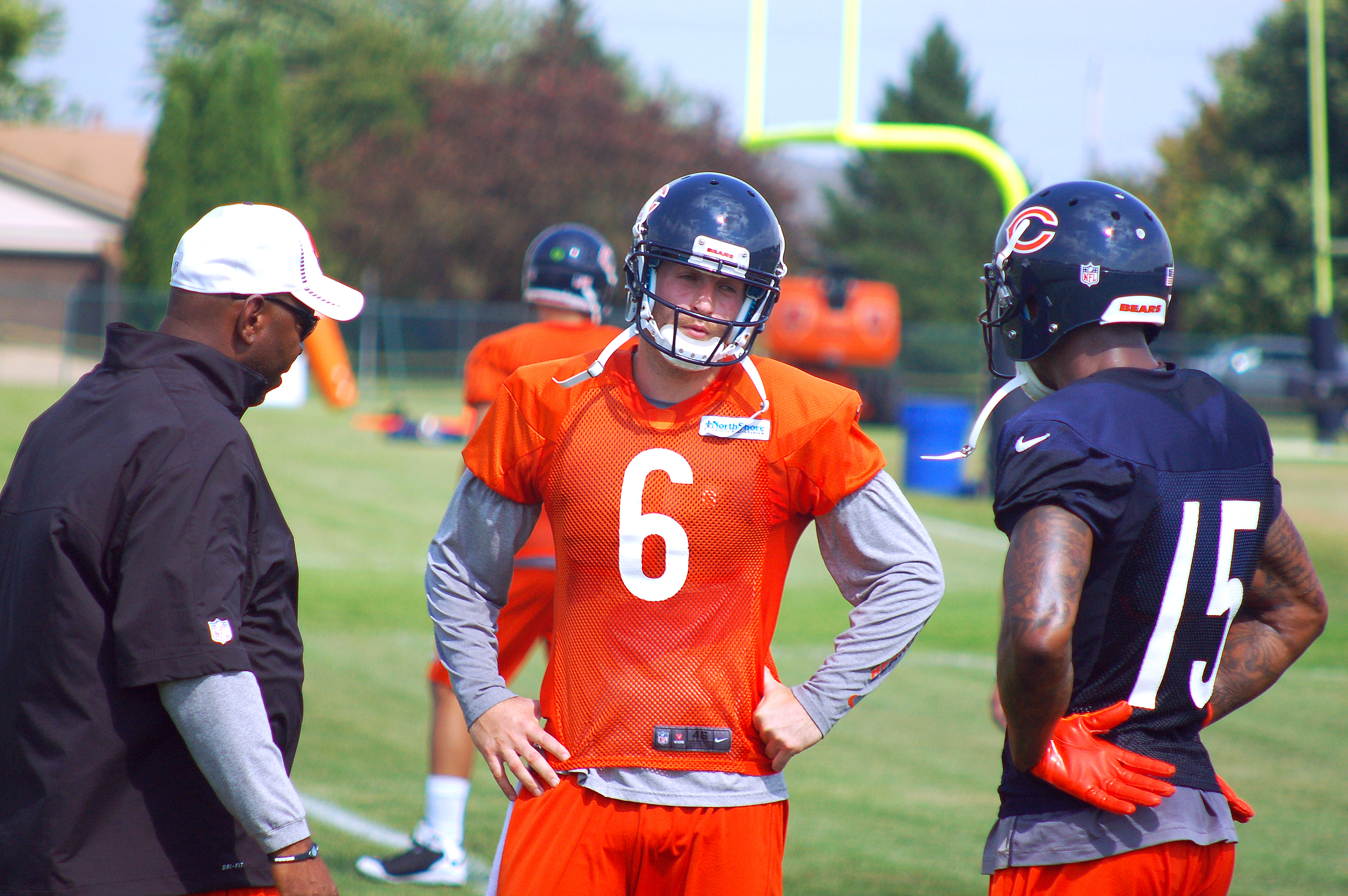
Marshall (right) talking with Bears quarterback and teammate Jay Cutler during training camp.

Marshall was traded to the Chicago Bears on March 13, 2012, for the Carolina Panthers' third round draft pick (which they traded to Chicago in the Greg Olsen trade) in 2012 and a future one in 2013, reuniting him with former Bronco teammate Jay Cutler leading to a career year for Marshall. In his Bears debut against the Indianapolis Colts, Marshall caught 9 passes for 119 yards, which was the twentieth time he surpassed one hundred yards in his career. He also caught a 3-yard touchdown pass, as the Bears would go on to win 41–21. After the Bears win over the Detroit Lions in Week 7, Marshall was fined $10,500 for wearing orange cleats. In Week 12 against the Minnesota Vikings, Marshall recorded 12 catches for 92 yards, and passed the 1,000 yards receiving mark in a season for the sixth time in his career, making Marshall the first Bears receiver to accomplish the feat since Marty Booker in 2002. Two weeks later against the Vikings, Marshall recorded ten catches for 160 yards, passing Booker's single season reception mark with a total of 101 receptions. In Week 16 against the Arizona Cardinals, Marshall broke Marcus Robinson's single-season franchise record for receiving yards set in 1999. On December 26, Marshall was named to the 2013 Pro Bowl, making him the second Bears receiver to be named to the game since Dick Gordon in 1971, with the first being Booker in 2002. However, Marshall did not play in the game due to having an arthroscopic procedure on his hip, and was replaced by Larry Fitzgerald. Marshall finished the season with 118 receptions, 89 catches more than the next Bears receiver Earl Bennett, tying the New England Patriots receiver Wes Welker for second, behind Detroit Lions' Calvin Johnson, and third in receiving yards with 1,508, behind Houston's Andre Johnson. He was ranked 27th by his fellow on the NFL Top 100 Players of 2013.

==== 2013 season ====
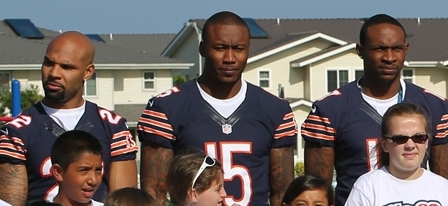
Marshall (center), along with Alshon Jeffery (right) and Matt Forte (left)

Marshall opened the 2013 season with eight receptions for 104 receiving yards against the Cincinnati Bengals. He caught the late go-ahead touchdown pass in the fourth quarter of the 24–21 victory. In Week 2, against the Minnesota Vikings, he had seven receptions for 113 receiving yards and one touchdown in the 31–30 victory. In Week 6 against the New York Giants, Marshall stated he will wear green cleats to support his mental illness foundation and promote Mental Health Awareness Week; Marshall was expected to be fined, so he additionally said, "I'm going to get fined, and I'm going to match that, and we want to partner with a cancer-care [charity]." Marshall was eventually fined $10,500 by the league. In Week 17, Marshall torched the Green Bay Packers by providing an early fourth quarter touchdown from quarterback Jay Cutler. Despite the effort, Marshall and the Bears lost the game 33–28, coming up short and missing the playoffs with a record of 8–8. Marshall ended the 2013 season with 100 receptions for 1,295 yards and a career-high 12 touchdown receptions, which is the third-highest in franchise history, behind Ken Kavanaugh and Dick Gordon's 13 in 1947 and 1970, respectively, and the most by a Bears player since Curtis Conway's 12 in 1995. It was also Marshall's fifth season with 100 or more receptions, which tied him with Wes Welker and Andre Johnson for the most in league history. Also, Marshall became the first player in Bears history to record multiple 100-reception seasons. He was ranked 36th by his fellow on the NFL Top 100 Players of 2014.

==== 2014 season ====
On May 19, 2014, Marshall signed a four-year, $39.3 million contract. The deal contained $22.3 million guaranteed, including a $7.5 million signing bonus. Another $700,000 was available through a 2017 escalator based on a Bears Super Bowl appearance in any of the first three seasons. Marshall was eligible for an annual $200,000 workout bonus throughout the contract's life. 2015: $7.5 million, 2016: $7.9 million, 2017: $8.3 million, 2018: Free Agent. In Week 2, against the San Francisco 49ers, he had five receptions for 48 yards and three touchdowns in the 28–20 victory on NBC Sunday Night Football. In Week 6, against the Atlanta Falcons, he had six receptions for 113 yards in the 27–13 victory. In Week 10, against the Green Bay Packers, he had eight receptions for 112 yards and one touchdown in the 55–14 loss on NBC Sunday Night Football. In Week 11, against the Minnesota Vikings, he had seven receptions for 90 receiving yards and two receiving touchdowns in the 21–13 victory. During Week 14 against the Dallas Cowboys, Marshall was kneed in the back by Barry Church, suffering two broken ribs and a collapsed lung. Marshall left the field via ambulance. On December 5, he was ruled out for the rest of the season. Overall, he finished the 2014 season with 61 receptions for 721 yards and eight touchdowns. He was ranked 57th by his fellow on the NFL Top 100 Players of 2015.

=== New York Jets ===
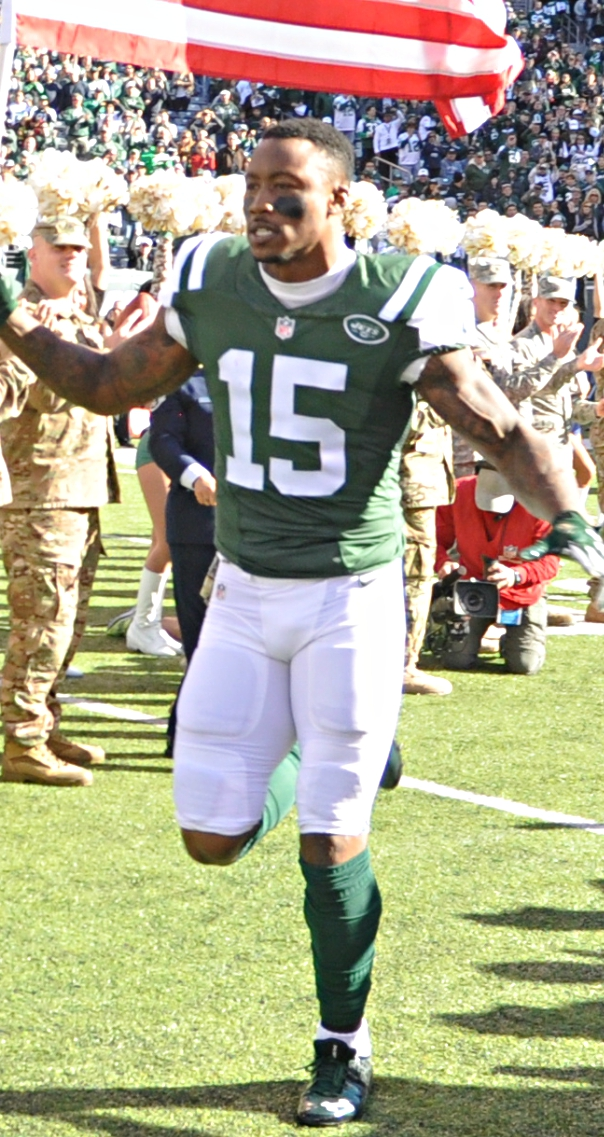
Marshall with the Jets in 2015

==== 2015 season ====
The Bears traded Marshall and a seventh round-selection in the 2015 NFL draft to the New York Jets in exchange for their fifth-round draft selection (Adrian Amos) on March 10, 2015. At the time, Marshall said that the Jets would be the last team that he plays for, and that he would retire if cut. "I'm not playing for another team. Four is all I need.

From Week 2 to Week 5, Marshall had gained over 100 yards in four straight games. In Week 3, Marshall surpassed the 10,000 receiving yards mark in his career. Starting in Week 9, Marshall recorded six consecutive games with a receiving touchdown. In Week 12, against the Miami Dolphins, he had nine receptions for 131 receiving yards and two touchdowns in the 38–20 victory. In Week 13, against the New York Giants, his 131-yard game gave him his eighth 1,000 receiving yard season of his career. Marshall became the first player in NFL history to have a 1,000-receiving yard season with four different teams. In Week 16, Marshall recorded 115 yards and two touchdowns in the 26–20 overtime victory over the New England Patriots. He finished the 2015 regular season with eight receptions for 126 receiving yards and a touchdown against the Buffalo Bills in Week 17.

Marshall finished the season with 109 receptions on 174 targets for 1,502 yards and 14 touchdowns. Marshall's season was historic in terms for the Jets franchise. He set new single-season records for receiving yards and receptions while tying the record for receiving touchdowns with Art Powell and Don Maynard. Marshall finished in the top-five among NFL wide receivers in targets, receptions, receiving yards, and touchdowns in 2015. He was named to his sixth Pro Bowl and was ranked 25th by his fellow on the NFL Top 100 Players of 2016.

==== 2016 season ====
Marshall's 2016 season became less productive than the previous year due to mostly dropped balls, constant rotation at the quarterback position, and locker room controversy with teammate Sheldon Richardson. He started in 15 games and finished the season with 788 receiving yards and three touchdowns.

After the 2016 season ended, Marshall was reported to be released by the Jets in late February. The Jets released Marshall in order to fully transition into a rebuilding stage.

=== New York Giants ===
Marshall signed a two-year, $12 million contract with the New York Giants. Like his tenure with the Jets, Marshall again put a timeline on his retirement, saying he would retire once his contract with the Giants was over.

On September 10, 2017, in the Giants' season opening 19–3 loss to the Dallas Cowboys on NBC Sunday Night Football, Marshall had one reception for ten yards in his Giants' debut.

On October 8, 2017, Marshall was carted off the field after hurting his ankle in the Giants' 27–22 Week 5 loss to the Los Angeles Chargers. The following day, Marshall announced in an Instagram post that he would undergo season-ending surgery. He was placed on injured reserve on October 10, 2017. He finished the 2017 season with 18 catches for 154 yards and zero touchdowns.

On April 19, 2018, Marshall was released by the Giants and was considered a bust by fans and the New York sports media.

=== Seattle Seahawks ===
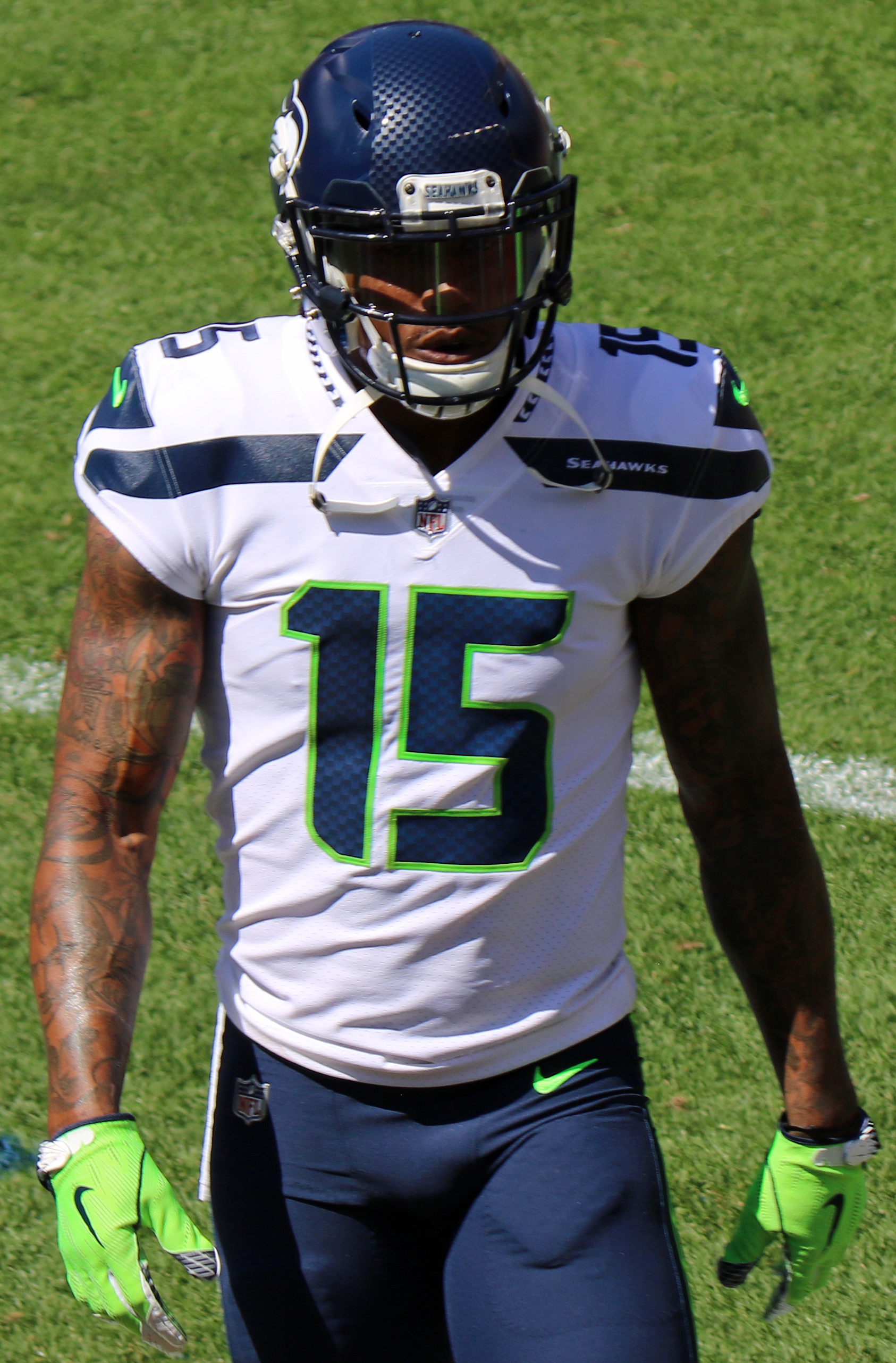
Marshall with the Seattle Seahawks in 2018

Marshall signed a one-year contract with the Seattle Seahawks worth up to $2 million with incentives on May 29, 2018.

In Week 1, Marshall caught a touchdown from quarterback Russell Wilson in a loss to the Denver Broncos. This would prove to be the last touchdown of his career. After playing in seven games, he was released by the Seahawks.

=== New Orleans Saints ===
Marshall was signed by the New Orleans Saints on November 12, 2018. He was released by New Orleans on December 13, after not appearing in any games.

== Career statistics ==
Legend
	Led the league
**Bold**	Career high

=== NFL ===
Year	Team	Games		Receiving					Rushing					Fumbles	
Year	Team	GP	GS	Rec	Yds	Avg	Lng	TD	Att	Yds	Avg	Lng	TD	Fum	Lost
2006	DEN	15	1	20	309	**15.5**	71T	2	2	12	6.0	6	0	1	0
2007	DEN	16	16	102	1,325	13.0	68T	7	5	**57**	11.4	**24**	0	3	1
2008	DEN	15	15	104	1,265	12.2	47	6	2	−4	−2.0	7	0	**4**	**3**
2009	DEN	15	13	101	1,120	11.1	**75T**	10	**7**	39	5.6	14	0	0	0
2010	MIA	14	14	86	1,014	11.8	46	3	2	3	1.5	4	0	2	1
2011	MIA	16	16	81	1,214	15.0	65T	6	1	13	**13.0**	13	0	1	1
2012	CHI	16	16	**118**	**1,508**	12.8	56	11	1	−2	−2.0	−2	0	2	0
2013	CHI	16	16	100	1,295	13.0	44	12	0	0	0.0	0	0	0	0
2014	CHI	13	13	61	721	11.8	47	8	0	0	0.0	0	0	1	1
2015	NYJ	16	16	109	1,502	13.8	69T	**14**	0	0	0.0	0	0	3	2
2016	NYJ	15	15	59	788	13.4	41	3	0	0	0.0	0	0	0	0
2017	NYG	5	5	18	154	8.6	18	0	0	0	0.0	0	0	0	0
2018	SEA	7	2	11	136	12.4	27	1	0	0	0.0	0	0	0	0
Career		179	158	970	12,351	12.7	75T	83	20	118	5.9	24	0	17	9

=== College ===
Season	Team	Class	Pos	GP	Receiving				Rushing			
Season	Team	Class	Pos	GP	Rec	Yds	Avg	TD	Att	Yds	Avg	TD
2002	UCF	FR	WR	9	2	18	9.0	0	**1**	−6	−6.0	0
2003	UCF	SO	WR	12	28	377	13.5	2	**1**	**8**	**8.0**	0
2004	UCF	JR	WR	10	8	84	10.5	0	0	0	0.0	0
2005	UCF	SR	WR	13	**74**	**1,195**	**16.1**	**11**	**1**	3	3.0	0
Career				44	112	1,674	14.9	13	3	5	1.7	0

== Career highlights ==
=== Awards and honors ===
NFL

- 6× Pro Bowl selection (2008, 2009, 2011, 2012, 2013, 2015)
- 2× First-team All-Pro selection (2012, 2013)
- 2× Second-team All-Pro selection (2009, 2015)
- NFL receiving touchdowns co-leader (2015)
- 2012 Pro Bowl MVP
- 3× AFC Offensive Player of the Week – Week 2 (2008), Week 14 (2009), Week 13 (2015)
- 10,000 Receiving Yards Club
- Ranked No. 61 in the Top 100 Players of 2011
- Ranked No. 27 in the Top 100 Players of 2013
- Ranked No. 36 in the Top 100 Players of 2014
- Ranked No. 57 in the Top 100 Players of 2015
- Ranked No. 25 in the Top 100 Players of 2016

College

- UCF Athletics Hall of Fame (2019)
- 2005 Hawaii Bowl MVP
- Second-team All-C-USA (2005)

High school

- Marshall's number #15 was retired at Lake Howell High School (2012)

=== NFL records and milestones ===
- First to have a 1,000 receiving yard season with four different teams (Denver Broncos, Miami Dolphins, Chicago Bears, and New York Jets)
- Most seasons with 100+ receptions (6)
- Most receptions in an NFL game (21)
- Third-most receptions in an NFL game (18)
- Most receptions spanning five games in NFL history (55)
- First player in NFL history to have at least 10 receptions in four out of five games (now tied with Calvin Johnson)
- First player since 1960 to record eight career games of at least 10 receptions in his first four seasons
- Fifth player in NFL history (first Broncos player; one of six total) to have at least 100 receptions in three straight seasons
- Ninth player in NFL history (second Broncos player) to have at least 100 receptions in back-to-back seasons (2007 and 2008)
- Caught 102 passes in 2007(second-career NFL season), becoming only the third second-year player in NFL history to have at least 100 receptions in a season

=== New York Jets franchise records ===
- Most receptions in a single season: 109 (2015)
- Most receiving yards in a single season: 1,502 (2015)
- Most receiving touchdowns in a single season: 14 (2015) (Tied with Don Maynard and Art Powell)

=== Chicago Bears franchise records ===
As of 2021's NFL off-season, Brandon Marshall held at least 6 Bears franchise records, including:

- Most receptions in a single season: 118 (2012)
- Most receiving yards in a single season: 1,508 (2012)
- Most Rec Yds/Game (career): 78.3
- Most Rec Yds/Game (season): 94.3 (2012)
- Most 100+ yard receiving games (season): 7 (2012; tied with Harlon Hill and Jeff Graham)
- Most 1,000+ receiving yard seasons: 2 (one of six players)

=== Pro Bowl records ===
- Most receiving touchdowns in single game (4)

== Media career ==
=== Television football analyst ===
Marshall has been a co-host on Inside the NFL since 2014 when he was still an active player in the league. On August 20, 2020, Marshall joined the cast of the Fox Sports talk show, First Things First. He remained a co-host of the show until his contract expired in August 2021. In August 2021 he chose to not renew his contract with Fox and to leave his position to pursue other professional opportunities. In 2016, he was a Nominee for the Emmy Awards Outstanding Sports Personality, Studio and Sports Event Analyst.

=== Podcast ===
Marshall hosts the White House podcast on Netflix with his podcast partner, Michael Irvin, which premiered on January 19, 2026.

Marshall was a founder of I AM ATHLETE, a sports media platform focused on athlete-led storytelling and long-form conversation. The platform was created to provide professional athletes with a space to share personal experiences, perspectives on the game, and discussions around culture, business, and life beyond sports, outside of traditional media structures.

== Personal life ==
Marshall has been nicknamed "The Beast" during his NFL career. Marshall enjoys restoring vintage automobiles. He is a member of the Kappa Alpha Psi fraternity (initiated into the Lambda Omega chapter) and does charity work with them. He is involved in an ongoing effort to rebuild Larimer Park in Pittsburgh, Pennsylvania. In 2010 he married Michi Nogami and they have three children. He married Kristen Jacques in July 2025

=== Borderline personality disorder ===
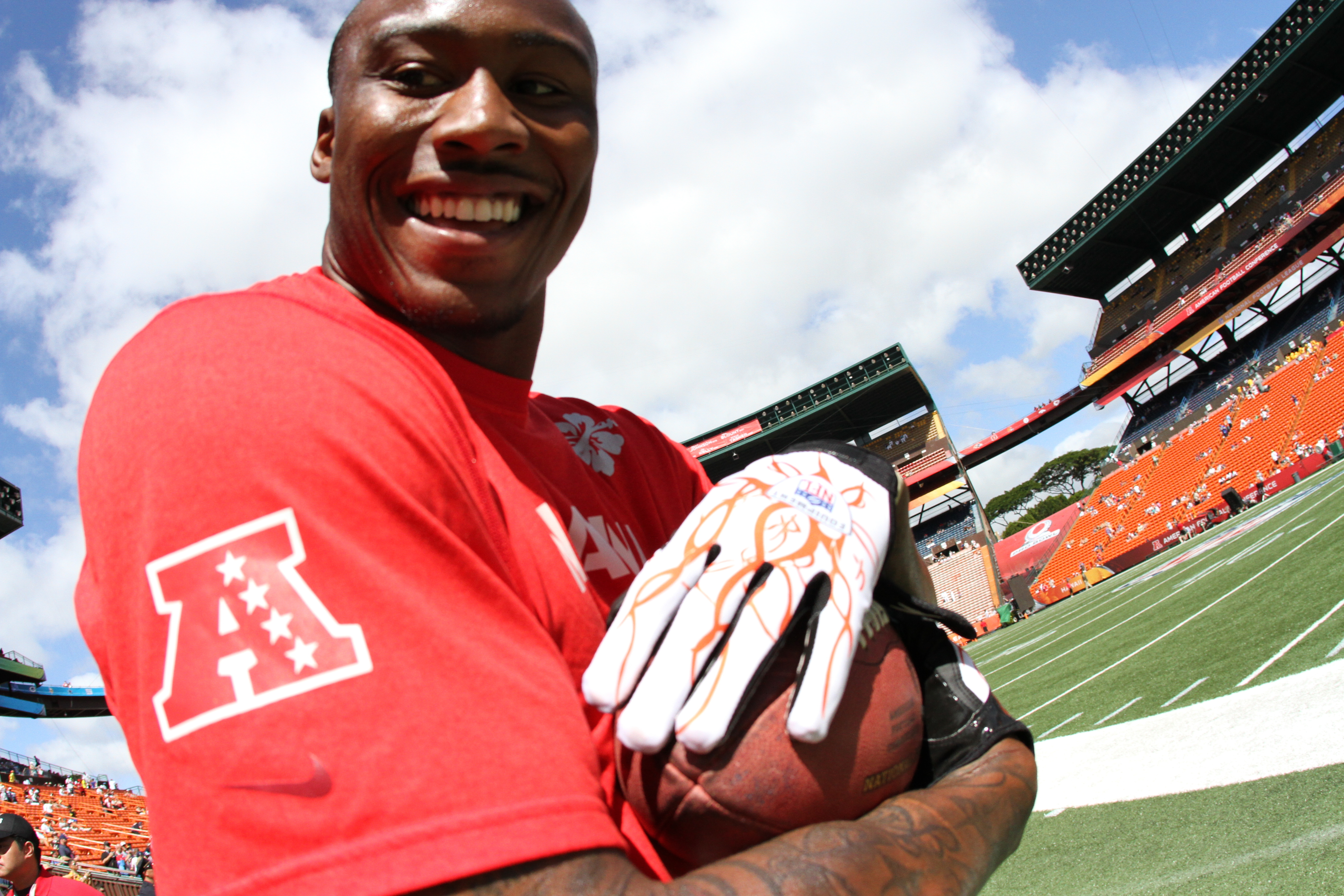
Marshall at the 2011 Pro Bowl.

On July 31, 2011, Marshall announced at a press conference that he had been diagnosed with borderline personality disorder (BPD) and that he hopes to spread awareness and understanding about the illness. Marshall said his entire professional career and adult personal life has been marred with symptoms of BPD, but only recently through treatment has he learned to consciously and effectively deal with the resulting problems of his actions that have been influenced by BPD. Marshall cited a recent study that suggests at least 35% of male prison inmates nationally, and 25% of female inmates, have been diagnosed with BPD. He said he hopes to help reduce the stigma of BPD, and encourage and lead others with the disorder to receive proper care. On October 10, 2013, Marshall donned a pair of bright green Nike cleats in support of Mental Illness Awareness Week. Marshall pledged to donate any fine he incurred from the NFL to charity, an estimated $5,250.

In March 2018, Marshall partnered with the University of Michigan, the rapper Logic, Glenn Close, his wife Michi and the Steven Schwartzberg Foundation in launching a campaign titled Who Can Relate, a national mental health awareness campaign. Marshall has also founded the mental health awareness organization, Project 375. This initiative is focused on ending the stigma and stereotypes associated with mental illness. Project 375 hosts trainings for different communities across the nation in order to educate others on identifying the signs of mental illness.

=== Legal troubles ===
According to Orlando-Orange County public records (case 48-2004-MM-012392-O), on Halloween 2004, while a student at UCF, Marshall was arrested in Orlando on charges of assault on a law enforcement officer, refusal to obey, disorderly conduct, and resisting an officer.

On January 1, 2007, Marshall was present at The Shelter, a nightclub in Denver, Colorado, along with teammates Javon Walker and Darrent Williams. The trio were attending a birthday party held for and by Denver Nuggets forward Kenyon Martin. As the players were leaving the club in a limousine, Williams was fatally shot in the neck after an unknown assailant opened fire on the vehicle. Willie Clark was later charged with the murder. Walker has stated in interviews that the shooter was likely a nightclub patron whose motive was retaliation after being involved in an altercation with Marshall's cousin earlier that night.

On March 26, 2007, Marshall was arrested in the Highlands Ranch suburb of Denver on suspicion of domestic violence after his girlfriend reported that following a domestic dispute, Marshall prevented a taxi she was in from leaving his house. Charges from the incident were later dismissed on May 25, 2007, after Marshall completed anger management counseling.

In the early morning of October 22, 2007, Marshall was arrested in the Denver-Aurora metropolitan area at the intersection of 14th and Blake St. for driving under the influence of alcohol. A trial was scheduled for September 16, but Marshall instead agreed to a plea bargain four days earlier; he pleaded guilty to a reduced charge of driving while ability impaired. He was sentenced to one-year probation and 24 hours of community service.

On June 12, 2008, Marshall was ticketed for an illegal lane change, then found to be without his license and proof of insurance. The case was eventually dropped as part of a plea bargain for the October 22, 2007, driving incident involving alcohol.

A September 17, 2008, article on CompleteColorado.com stated that the solicitor's office in Fulton County, Georgia filed misdemeanor battery charges on September 10 for an alleged incident on March 4, 2008, in Atlanta, Georgia. Marshall was booked on March 6, then released the next day after posting a $1,000 cash bond. The case was assigned to Judge John Mather in Georgia state court. On August 14, 2009, a jury in Atlanta found Marshall not guilty.

On March 1, 2009, Marshall was arrested in Atlanta for disorderly conduct after allegedly being involved in a fight with his fiancée, Michi Nogami-Campbell. Marshall was released on a $300 bond. The charges were dropped the following day.

On April 23, 2011, Marshall was stabbed near his stomach by his wife, Michi Nogami-Marshall. He was taken to a hospital and was released two days later. He has since made a full recovery.

It was later revealed by police that Marshall's wife did make a brief 911 call, but it only described an unspecified emergency and no mention of a stabbing ever took place. She was charged with aggravated battery with a deadly weapon and is free on $7,500 bail.

On early Sunday, March 11, 2012, two days before his trade to the Bears, Marshall was accused of hitting a woman in the face at a New York club and being involved in a melee. The New York Post stated that Marshall, his wife and some friends were at Marquee when a brawl ensued, and Marshall punched the woman below her left eye, although he may have been attempting to hit the woman's friends. The investigation later ended after a lack of evidence of Marshall's role in the incident.
