= 2007 Denver Broncos season =

American football team season

- Owner: Pat Bowlen
- General manager: Mike Shanahan
- President: Pat Bowlen
- Head coach: Mike Shanahan
- Offensive coordinator: Rick Dennison
- Defensive coordinator: Bob Slowik
- Home stadium: Invesco Field at Mile High

Results
- Record: 7–9
- Division place: 2nd AFC West
- Playoffs: Did not qualify

The 2007 season was the Denver Broncos' 38th in the National Football League (NFL) and their 48th overall. A loss to the Houston Texans in Week 15 and a win by the San Diego Chargers the following Sunday knocked them out of playoff contention, marking the second year in a row they failed to make the playoffs. The Broncos' 7–9 record was their worst since 1999, their last losing season (when they went 6–10).

== Offseason ==
The 2006–2007 off-season began as two members of the team died in less than two months after the season ended. Cornerback Darrent Williams was shot and killed in his H2 limousine on New Year's Day, just a few hours after the Broncos last game of the 2006 season. Soon after, Broncos 3rd string running back Damien Nash collapsed and died in a pick-up basketball game.

The Broncos traded running back Tatum Bell and offensive tackle George Foster to the Detroit Lions for former Pro Bowl cornerback Dre' Bly to compensate for the loss of Williams. In addition to the trade for Bly, the Broncos had made a trade to the Miami Dolphins for Dan Wilkinson, only to have that trade voided because Wilkinson did not show up to Denver for his scheduled physical.

Denver added running back Travis Henry, fullback Thump Belton, and tight end Daniel Graham through free agency. The team released linebacker Al Wilson during the month of April for health and salary cap reasons.

Denver also signed backup WR Brandon Stokley from the Indianapolis Colts and P/Kickoff Specialist Todd Sauerbrun.

Signed K Brandon Pace (Virginia Tech) and C Mark Fenton (Colorado) on May 7. Released OL Tim Duckworth on May 7.

=== NFL draft ===
2007 Denver Broncos draft
Round	Pick	Player	Position	College	Notes
1	17	Jarvis Moss	Defensive end	Florida	
2	56	Tim Crowder	Defensive end	Texas	
3	70	Ryan Harris	Offensive tackle	Notre Dame	from Washington
4	121	Marcus Thomas	Defensive tackle	Florida	from Denver via Minnesota and Atlanta
Made roster * Made at least one Pro Bowl during career

== Personnel ==
=== Staff / Coaches ===
2007 Denver Broncos staff
Front office: Majority Owner / President and chief executive officer – Pat Bowlen; Head coaches: Executive vice president of football operations/head coach – Mike Shanahan; Assistant head coach/defense – Jim Bates; Assistant head coach/quarterbacks – Mike Heimerdinger; Associate head coach – Steve Watson; Offensive coaches: Offensive coordinator/offensive line – Rick Dennison; Running backs – Bobby Turner; Wide receivers/quarterbacks – Jeremy Bates; Tight ends – Pat McPherson; Offensive assistant – Jim Ryan	Defensive coaches: Defensive coordinator/defensive backs – Bob Slowik; Defensive line – Jacob Burney; Defensive line – Bill Johnson; Linebackers – Joe Baker; Assistant defensive backs – Ronnie Bradford; Defensive assistant – Charlie Jackson; Special teams coaches: Special teams coordinator – Scott O'Brien; Special teams assistant – Keith Burns; Special teams assistant – Ryan Slowik; Strength and conditioning: Strength and conditioning – Rich Tuten; Assistant Strength & Conditioning – Dwayne Chandler; Assistant strength and conditioning – Greg Saporta

=== Roster ===
2007 Denver Broncos roster
Quarterbacks (QB): 6 Jay Cutler; 4 Darrell Hackney; 11 Patrick Ramsey; Running backs (RB): 30 Mike Bell; 23 Andre Hall KR; 20 Travis Henry; 37 Cecil Sapp FB; 26 Paul Smith FB; 35 Selvin Young; Wide receivers (WR): 19 Taylor Jacobs; 15 Brandon Marshall; 17 Glenn Martinez; 14 Brandon Stokley; 84 Javon Walker; Tight ends (TE): 89 Daniel Graham; 85 Chad Mustard; 88 Tony Scheffler	Offensive linemen (OL): 69 P. J. Alexander G; 74 Ryan Harris T; 70 Montrae Holland G; 73 Chris Kuper G; 78 Matt Lepsis T; 62 Chris Myers C/G; 64 Erik Pears T; 72 Isaac Snell G/T; Defensive linemen (DL): 77 Larry Birdine DE; 90 Paul Carrington DE; 96 Tim Crowder DE/DT; 92 Elvis Dumervil DE; 60 John Engelberger DE; 68 Steven Harris DT; 98 Josh Mallard DE/DT; 99 Alvin McKinley DT; 97 Kenny Peterson DE; 79 Marcus Thomas DT	Linebackers (LB): 57 Jordan Beck OLB; 52 Ian Gold OLB; 53 Louis Green OLB; 58 Nate Webster OLB; 55 D. J. Williams MLB; 51 Jamie Winborn; Defensive backs (DB): 21 Hamza Abdullah S; 24 Champ Bailey CB; 32 Dré Bly CB; 38 Steve Cargile SS; 22 Domonique Foxworth CB/S; 47 John Lynch FS; 41 Karl Paymah CB; 43 Roderick Rogers FS; Special teams (ST): 1 Jason Elam K; 83 Mike Leach LS; 2 Sam Paulescu P; 5 Matt Prater K	Practice squad: -- Michael Bozeman DT; -- Carlton Brewster WR; 93 Antwon Burton DT; 65 Mark Fenton C; 16 Marquay McDaniel WR; 86 Chad Upshaw TE; 75 Cliff Washburn T; Reserve: 82 Stephen Alexander TE (IR); 91 Ebenezer Ekuban DE (IR); 25 Nick Ferguson S (IR); 50 Ben Hamilton G (IR); 56 Warrick Holdman LB (IR); 81 Nate Jackson TE (IR); 94 Jarvis Moss DE (IR); 66 Tom Nalen C (IR); 80 Rod Smith WR (IR); Rookies in italics 53 active, 9 reserve, 7 practice squad

- Sam Adams (DT) signed with the Denver Broncos on June 4, 2007. He was released on December 4.
- Greg Eslinger (C) was moved to the practice squad at the beginning of 2007. On November 13, 2007, the Cleveland Browns picked him off the Broncos practice squad.
- 12 Domenik Hixon (KR) played 4 games for the Denver Broncos to start the 2007 season then was released in early October.

== Preseason ==
Week	Date	Opponent	Result	Record	Game site	NFL.com recap
1	August 13	at San Francisco 49ers	W 17–13	1–0	Monster Park	Recap
2	August 18	at Dallas Cowboys	L 20–31	1–1	Texas Stadium	Recap
3	August 22	Cleveland Browns	L 16–17	1–2	Invesco Field at Mile High	Recap
4	August 29	Arizona Cardinals	W 21–3	2–2	Invesco Field at Mile High	Recap

== Schedule ==
Week	Date	Opponent	Result	Record	Game site	NFL.com recap
1	September 9	at Buffalo Bills	W 15–14	1–0	Ralph Wilson Stadium	Recap
2	September 16	Oakland Raiders	W 23–20 (OT)	2–0	Invesco Field at Mile High	Recap
3	September 23	Jacksonville Jaguars	L 14–23	2–1	Invesco Field at Mile High	Recap
4	September 30	at Indianapolis Colts	L 20–38	2–2	RCA Dome	Recap
5	October 7	San Diego Chargers	L 3–41	2–3	Invesco Field at Mile High	Recap
6	Bye					
7	October 21	Pittsburgh Steelers	W 31–28	3–3	Invesco Field at Mile High	Recap
8	October 29	Green Bay Packers	L 13–19 (OT)	3–4	Invesco Field at Mile High	Recap
9	November 4	at Detroit Lions	L 7–44	3–5	Ford Field	Recap
10	November 11	at Kansas City Chiefs	W 27–11	4–5	Arrowhead Stadium	Recap
11	November 19	Tennessee Titans	W 34–20	5–5	Invesco Field at Mile High	Recap
12	November 25	at Chicago Bears	L 34–37 (OT)	5–6	Soldier Field	Recap
13	December 2	at Oakland Raiders	L 20–34	5–7	McAfee Coliseum	Recap
14	December 9	Kansas City Chiefs	W 41–7	6–7	Invesco Field at Mile High	Recap
15	December 13	at Houston Texans	L 13–31	6–8	Reliant Stadium	Recap
16	December 24	at San Diego Chargers	L 3–23	6–9	Qualcomm Stadium	Recap
17	December 30	Minnesota Vikings	W 22–19 (OT)	7–9	Invesco Field at Mile High	Recap

== Standings ==
AFC West
	W	L	T	PCT	DIV	CONF	PF	PA	STK
^{(3)} San Diego Chargers	11	5	0	.688	5–1	9–3	412	284	W6
Denver Broncos	7	9	0	.438	3–3	6–6	320	409	W1
Kansas City Chiefs	4	12	0	.250	2–4	3–9	226	335	L9
Oakland Raiders	4	12	0	.250	2–4	4–8	283	398	L4

== Regular season ==
=== Week 1: at Buffalo Bills ===
Quarter	1	2	3	4	Total
Broncos	3	3	6	3	15
Bills	7	0	7	0	14

at Ralph Wilson Stadium, Orchard Park, New York

- Game time: 1:00 pm EDT/12:00 pm CDT
- Game weather: 70 °F (21 °C) (Windy & Rainy)
- Game attendance: 71,132
- Referee: Gerry Austin
- TV announcers (CBS): Gus Johnson & Randy Cross

The Bills scored first on a 74-yard kick return by Roscoe Parrish. Denver then answered with a 10 play drive that led to a field goal by Jason Elam, making it 7–3.

In the second quarter Denver scored first with a 48-yard field goal. Bills kicker Rian Lindell then missed a 45-yard field goal. The Broncos drove deep into Bills territory at the close of the half but Cutler threw an interception to end the drive. The Bills then drove into Denver territory and tried a long field goal but failed due to a false start, then ended the half with an interception thrown to Elvis Dumervil.

On the opening kickoff for the second half, a scary injury occurred to Bills TE Kevin Everett, as he suffered a cervical spine injury while making a tackle on Domenik Hixon. Everett later underwent surgery that day. On September 11, 2007, Everett showed significant movement in his arms and legs, which led doctors to speculate that he might eventually be able to walk again. Indeed, Everett walked in public for the first time at Ralph Wilson Stadium before the home finale against the New York Giants on December 23, 2007.

The Broncos began the second half with a drive that ended with a missed 50-yard field goal. The Bills then made a nine play drive that ended with a 23-yard touchdown run by Marshawn Lynch. The Broncos responded with a drive ending with a touchdown pass to Brandon Marshall. They then attempted to tie the game with a two-point conversion but failed with an incomplete pass to Javon Walker.

The fourth quarter had little scoring. Elam missed a field goal, but the Bills failed to score or run out the clock, giving Denver the ball with a little over two minutes to play. After an ill-advised lateral bounced free, (saved by rookie back Selvin Young smartly batting the loose ball out of bounds) the Bronco's faced a seemingly insurmountable 3rd and 23 to go. Cutler immediately turned in the best clutch performance of his NFL career to date, one that drew comparisons to John Elway by both sportswriters and teammates.

Cutler's drive included two fourth down conversions to drive deep into Bills' territory, where, with no time outs, they rushed the field goal unit onto the field with ten seconds left and the clock ticking down. Execution by the field goal unit allowed Jason Elam to kick the game winning 42-yard field goal just as the clock ticked to 0:00. Buffalo ended up leading the game for over 51 minutes of the contest. Denver lead for one second.

==== Scoring drives ====
- Q1 – BUF – 6:17 – 74-yard TD Punt Return by Roscoe Parrish (Rian Lindell kick) (7–0 BUF)
- Q1 – DEN – 0:33 – Jason Elam 21-yard FG (7–3 BUF)
- Q2 – DEN – 7:51 – Elam 48-yard field goal (7–6 BUF)
- Q3 – BUF – 6:24 – 23-yard TD run by Marshawn Lynch (Lindell kick) (14–6 BUF)
- Q3 – DEN – 0:54 – 5-yard TD pass from Jay Cutler to Brandon Marshall (Two-Point Conversion Failed) (14–12 BUF)
- Q4 – DEN – 0:00 – Elam 42-yard FG (15–14 DEN)

=== Week 2: vs. Oakland Raiders ===
Quarter	1	2	3	4	OT	Total
Raiders	0	3	7	10	0	20
Broncos	7	10	0	3	3	23

at Invesco Field at Mile High, Denver, Colorado

- Game time: 4:15 pm EDT/2:15 pm MDT
- Game weather: 87 °F (31 °C) (Mostly Cloudy)
- Game attendance: 76,784
- Referee: Walt Anderson
- TV announcers (CBS): Kevin Harlan and Rich Gannon

In the first quarter, the Broncos were the first to score with a nine-yard touchdown pass from Cutler to WR Brandon Stokley after taking the ball from the Raiders with an interception by Alex Ludwig. The second quarter began with another interception by Marcus Thomas after a deflection by John Lynch. The game was then halted due to lightning, but resumed after several minutes. Denver failed to capitalize however, with Cutler throwing an interception that led to a Raider field goal by Sebastian Janikowski. Later however the Broncos capitalized on a 40-yard run by Selvin Young, finishing the drive with a 4-yard touchdown by Cecil Sapp. The Broncos then forced a punt by Oakland and drove for a 23-yard field goal by Elam, putting them up 17–3 at the half.

Denver began the second half with a drive that ended with a missed field goal by Elam. The Raiders responded with a 46-yard touchdown pass from Josh McCown to Jerry Porter. They then kicked an onside kick which they recovered but failed to drive due to penalties. However Gerard Warren then sacked Cutler in the end zone for a safety to begin the fourth quarter.

Oakland punted on their next possession, but Cutler threw an interception to Thomas Howard who returned it 44 yards for a score. Oakland made a two-point conversion, making it 20–17 Oakland. Later in the quarter Elam kicked a 20-yard field goal with 2:12 in time remaining to tie to score at 20–20. The Raiders failed to score, throwing an interception to Dre Bly to send the game into overtime.

The Broncos won the coin toss to get the ball first in overtime, but failed to score, punting it to Oakland. Raider Lamont Jordan then broke a 33-yard run to set up a 52-yard field goal attempt by Janikowski. Denver called time out just before the Raiders got the snap off and so Janikowski's successful kick did not count. On his next attempt he hooked it left, giving Denver the ball. The Broncos then drove to the Oakland 4-yard line, then kicked a game-winning field goal by Elam.

==== Scoring drives ====
- Q1 – DEN – 9:58 – 9-yard TD pass from Jay Cutler to Brandon Stokley (7–0 DEN)
- Q2 – OAK – 4:34 – 38-yard FG by Sebastian Janikowski (7–3 DEN)
- Q2 – DEN – 7:26 – 4-yard TD run by Cecil Sapp (Elam kick) (14–3 DEN)
- Q2 – DEN – 14:42 – 23-yard FG by Elam (17–3 DEN)
- Q3 – OAK – 9:41 – 46-yard TD pass from Josh McCown to Jerry Porter (Janikowski kick) (17–10 DEN)
- Q4 – OAK – 0:45 – Safety, Cutler sacked by Gerard Warren in end zone (17–12 DEN)
- Q4 – OAK – 6:05 – 44-yard interception return by Thomas Howard (two-point conversion, Josh McCown to Ronald Curry) (20–17 OAK)
- Q4 – DEN – 12:42 – 20-yard FG by Elam (20–20)
- OT – DEN – 9:12 – 23-yard FG by Elam (23–20 DEN)

=== Week 3: vs. Jacksonville Jaguars ===
Quarter	1	2	3	4	Total
Jaguars	0	17	3	3	23
Broncos	0	7	0	7	14

at Invesco Field at Mile High, Denver, Colorado

- Game time: 2:05 p.m. MST
- Game weather: 75 °F (24 °C) (Mostly Cloudy)
- Game attendance: 76,463
- Referee: Terry McAulay
- TV announcers (CBS): Dick Enberg (play-by-play) and Randy Cross (color commentator)

Following their OT win over the Raiders, the Broncos stayed at home for an intraconference duel with the Jacksonville Jaguars. After a scoreless first quarter, Denver trailed early as Jaguars QB David Garrard completed a 3-yard TD pass to WR Reggie Williams. The Broncos tied the game with QB Jay Cutler completing a 1-yard TD pass to TE Nate Jackson. However, Jacksonville took the lead with FB Greg Jones getting a 4-yard TD run, while kicker John Carney nailed a 19-yard field goal.

In the third quarter, Denver continued to trail as the Jaguars increased its lead with Carney's 27-yard field goal, which was the only score of the period. In the fourth quarter, the Broncos attempted a comeback with RB Travis Henry getting a 6-yard TD run. However, Jacksonville sealed their win with Carney kicking an 18-yard field goal.

With the loss, Denver fell to 2–1.

=== Week 4: at Indianapolis Colts ===
Quarter	1	2	3	4	Total
Broncos	10	3	7	0	20
Colts	0	14	14	10	38

at RCA Dome, Indianapolis, Indiana

- Game time: 4:15 p.m. EST/3:15 p.m. CST
- Game weather: Game played indoors (Domed stadium)
- Game attendance: 57,274
- Referee: Tony Corrente
- TV announcers (CBS): Jim Nantz and Phil Simms

==== Game summary ====
Hoping to rebound from their home loss to the Jaguars, the Broncos flew to the RCA Dome for an intraconference fight with the defending-Super Bowl champions, the Indianapolis Colts. In the first quarter, Denver galloped to an early lead with kicker Jason Elam getting a 35-yard field goal, along with QB Jay Cutler (Indiana native) complete a 7-yard TD pass to WR Brandon Marshall. In the second quarter, the Colts responded with RB Joseph Addai got a 14-yard TD run. The Broncos replied with Elam kicking a 22-yard field goal, yet Indianapolis took the lead with QB Peyton Manning completing a 9-yard TD pass to TE Dallas Clark.

In the third quarter, Denver began to struggle as Manning got a 1-yard TD run, along with completing a 3-yard TD pass to Clark. The Broncos got close with Cutler getting a 2-yard TD run. However, in the fourth quarter, the Colts sealed their win with Manning completing a 5-yard TD pass to WR Reggie Wayne, along with kicker Adam Vinatieri nailing a 22-yard field goal.

With their second-straight loss, Denver fell to 2–2.

==== Scoring summary ====
- Scoring

First quarter

- DEN – Jason Elam 35-yard field goal, 11:32. Broncos 3–0. Drive: 8 plays, 47 yards, 3:28.
- DEN – Brandon Marshall 7-yard pass from Jay Cutler (Elam kick), 2:19. Broncos 10–0. Drive: 10 plays, 86 yards, 5:28.

Second quarter

- IND – Joseph Addai 14-yard run (Vinatieri kick), 14:23. Broncos 10–7. Drive: 7 plays, 46 yards, 2:56.
- DEN – Jason Elam 22-yard field goal, 8:29. Broncos 13–7. Drive: 12 plays, 76 yards, 5:54.
- IND – Dallas Clark 9-yard pass from Peyton Manning (Vinatieri kick), 3:49. Colts 14–13. Drive: 9 plays, 61 yards, 4:40.

Third quarter

- IND – Peyton Manning 1-yard run (Vinatieri kick), 11:46. Colts 21–13. Drive: 7 plays, 73 yards, 3:14.
- IND – Dallas Clark 3-yard pass (Vinatieri kick), 8:55. Colts 28–13. Drive: 4 plays, 24 yards, 2:03.
- DEN – Jay Cutler 2-yard run (Elam kick), 1:10. Colts 28–20. Drive: 14 plays, 79 yards, 7:45.

Fourth quarter

- IND – Reggie Wayne 5-yard pass from Peyton Manning (Vinatieri kick), 10:56. Colts 35–20. Drive: 10 plays, 83 yards, 5:14.
- IND – Adam Vinatieri 22-yard field goal, 2:34. Colts 38–20. Drive: 13 plays, 76 yards, 5:59.

=== Week 5: vs San Diego Chargers ===
Quarter	1	2	3	4	Total
Chargers	14	6	14	7	41
Broncos	0	3	0	0	3

at Invesco Field at Mile High, Denver, Colorado

- Game time: 1:15 pm. PST/2:15 p.m. MST
- Game weather: 54 °F (12 °C) (Partly Sunny)
- Game attendance: 76,879
- Referee: Scott Green
- TV announcers (CBS): Jim Nantz (play-by-play) & Phil Simms (color commentator)

Hoping to rebound from their road loss to the Colts, the Broncos went home for a Week 5 divisional duel with the San Diego Chargers. In the first quarter, Denver trailed early as Chargers QB Philip Rivers got a 2-yard TD run, while LB Brandon Siler returned a fumble 23 yards for a touchdown. In the second quarter, the Chargers continued its offensive revival with kicker Nate Kaeding getting a 26-yard field goal. Afterwards, the Broncos got their only score of the game, as kicker Jason Elam got a 30-yard field goal. San Diego ended the half with Kaeding nailing a 45-yard field goal.

In the third quarter, Denver continued to get pounded with Rivers completing a 9-yard TD pass to TE Antonio Gates and a 15-yard TD pass to WR Vincent Jackson. In the fourth quarter, San Diego sealed their victory with RB Michael Turner getting a 74-yard TD run for the only score of the period.

With their third-straight loss, not only did the Broncos fall to 2–3 entering their bye week, but the loss marked their worse home loss since losing to the Kansas City Chiefs 56–10 on October 23, 1966. The 38-point deficit therefore marked Denver's worst home loss since the AFL-NFL merger.

=== Week 7: vs. Pittsburgh Steelers ===
Quarter	1	2	3	4	Total
Steelers	7	0	7	14	28
Broncos	7	14	7	3	31

at Invesco Field at Mile High, Denver, Colorado

- Game time: 8:15 pm EDT (Sunday Night Football)
- Game weather: 37 °F (3 °C), (Partly Cloudy)
- Game attendance: 77,038
- Referee: Bill Carollo
- TV announcers (NBC): Al Michaels (play by play), John Madden (color commentator), & Andrea Kremer (sideline reporter)

Coming off their bye week, the Broncos stayed at home for a Sunday night intraconference duel with the Pittsburgh Steelers. In the first quarter, Denver trailed early with Steelers QB Ben Roethlisberger completing a 1-yard TD pass to TE Heath Miller. Denver responded with QB Jay Cutler completing a 15-yard TD pass to WR Brandon Stokley. In the second quarter, the Broncos took the lead with Cutler's 1-yard TD pass to FB Cecil Sapp, along with rookie DE Tim Crowder returning a fumble 50 yards for a touchdown.

In the third quarter, the Steelers tried to come back with Roethlisberger completing a 13-yard TD pass to WR Santonio Holmes. Denver answered with Cutler completing a 1-yard TD pass to TE Tony Scheffler. In the fourth quarter, Pittsburgh managed to tie the game with Roethlisberger completing a 13-yard TD pass to TE Matt Spaeth and a 12-yard TD pass to Miller. Kicker Jason Elam came through for the third time this year as he nailed the game-winning 49-yard field goal.

With their three-game skid snapped, the Broncos improved to 3–3.

=== Week 8: vs. Green Bay Packers ===
Quarter	1	2	3	4	OT	Total
Packers	7	6	0	0	6	19
Broncos	7	0	3	3	0	13

- Game time: 8:30 pm EDT (Monday Night Football)
- Game weather: 67 °F (19 °C), (Partly Cloudy)
- Game attendance: 77,160
- Referee: Ron Winter
- TV announcers (ESPN): Mike Tirico (play-by-play), Ron Jaworski, Tony Kornheiser (color commentators), Michele Tafoya, & Suzy Kolber (sideline reporters)

Coming off their Sunday night home win over the Steelers, the Broncos stayed at home for a Monday Night interconference fight with the Green Bay Packers. In the first quarter, Denver took the early lead with QB Jay Cutler completing a 5-yard TD pass to TE Tony Scheffler. The Packers responded with QB Brett Favre completing a 79-yard TD pass to WR James Jones. In the second quarter, Green Bay took the lead with kicker Mason Crosby getting a 19-yard and a 26-yard field goal.

In the third quarter, the Broncos began to rally as kicker Jason Elam got a 45-yard field goal for the only score of the period. In the fourth quarter, Denver managed to get a last-second 21-yard field goal from Elam to send the game into overtime. On the Packers' first play of the period, Favre sealed the win with an 82-yard TD pass to WR Greg Jennings.

With the loss, not only did the Broncos fall to 3–4, but it also marked the first time in franchise history that they lost to the Packers at home.

=== Week 9: at Detroit Lions ===
Quarter	1	2	3	4	Total
Broncos	0	0	0	7	7
Lions	3	13	14	14	44

at Ford Field, Detroit, Michigan

- Game time: 1:00 p.m. EST/12:00 p.m. CST
- Game weather: Game played indoors (Domed stadium)
- Game attendance: 60,784
- Referee: Jerome Boger
- TV announcers (CBS): Kevin Harlan and Rich Gannon

Hoping to rebound from their Monday Night loss to the Packers, the Broncos flew to Ford Field for a Week 9 interconference duel with the Detroit Lions. In the first quarter, Denver trailed early as Lions kicker Jason Hanson managed to get a 43-yard field goal for the only score of the period. In the second quarter, the Broncos continued to struggle as Hanson gave Detroit a 53-yard field goal, while QB Jon Kitna completed a 15-yard TD pass to WR Mike Furrey. The Lions ended the half with Hanson kicking a 38-yard field goal. Even worse, starting QB Jay Cutler (3/4 for 20 yards) left the game with a lower left leg injury.

In the third quarter, Detroit continued to destroy Denver as DE Dewayne White returned a fumble 3 yards for a touchdown, while Kitna completed a 49-yard TD pass to WR Shaun McDonald. In the fourth quarter, the Lions finished their job as NT Shaun Rogers returned an interception 66 yards for a touchdown, while RB T. J. Duckett got a 3-yard TD run. The Broncos prevented a shutout when QB Patrick Ramsey completed a 2-yard TD pass to WR Brandon Stokley.

With the loss, Denver fell to 3–5.

This was the second time this year that the Broncos lost by at least 37 points.

=== Week 10: at Kansas City Chiefs ===
Quarter	1	2	3	4	Total
Broncos	3	3	14	7	27
Chiefs	3	5	3	0	11

at Arrowhead Stadium, Kansas City, Missouri

- Game time: 1:00 p.m. EST/12:00 p.m. CST
- Game weather: 69 °F (21 °C) (Overcast)
- Game attendance: 77,368
- Referee: Tony Corrente
- TV announcers (CBS): Greg Gumbel (play-by-play) and Dan Dierdorf (color commentator)

Trying to snap a two-game losing skid, the Broncos flew to Arrowhead Stadium for an AFC West duel with the Kansas City Chiefs. In the first quarter, Denver drew first blood with kicker Jason Elam getting a 44-yard field goal. The Chiefs responded with kicker Dave Rayner getting a 38-yard field goal. In the second quarter, the Broncos trailed as K.C. Safety Bernard Pollard blocked a punt that was deep in Denver territory. The ball rolled out the back of the end zone for a safety. The Broncos respond with Elam kicking a 50-yard field goal. However, the Chiefs regained the lead prior to halftime as Rayner kicked a 36-yard field goal.

In the third quarter, Denver retook the lead as rookie RB Selvin Young got a 20-yard TD run, along with LB Nate Webster returning a fumble 58 yards for a touchdown. Kansas City answered with Rayner nailing a 39-yard field goal. In the fourth quarter, the Broncos closed out the game with QB Jay Cutler completing an 18-yard TD pass to TE Daniel Graham.

With the win, not only did Denver improve to 4–5, but it also marked their first win at Arrowhead Stadium since 2002.

=== Week 11: vs. Tennessee Titans ===
Quarter	1	2	3	4	Total
Titans	0	10	7	3	20
Broncos	14	6	7	7	34

at Invesco Field at Mile High, Denver, Colorado

- Game time: 8:30 pm EDT (Monday Night Football)
- Game weather: 63 °F (17 °C) (Clear)
- Game attendance: 76,590
- Referee: Gerry Austin
- TV announcers (ESPN): Mike Tirico (play-by-play), Ron Jaworski, Tony Kornheiser (color commentators), & Michele Tafoya (sideline reporter)

Coming off an impressive divisional road win over the Chiefs, the Broncos went home for a Week 11 Monday Night intraconference duel with the Tennessee Titans. In the first quarter, Denver drew first blood with QB Jay Cutler completing a 48-yard TD pass to WR Brandon Stokley, along with WR/PR Glenn Martinez returning a punt 80 yards for a touchdown. In the second quarter, the Titans got on the board with QB Vince Young completing a 21-yard TD pass to WR Brandon Jones. Afterwards, the Broncos regained some of their lead with kicker Jason Elam getting a 21-yard and a 39-yard field goal. Tennessee ended the half with kicker Rob Bironas getting a 56-yard field goal.

In the third quarter, Denver responded with Cutler completing a 41-yard TD pass to WR Brandon Marshall. The Titans replied with Young getting a 4-yard TD run. In the fourth quarter, Tennessee drew closer as Bironas nailed a 37-yard field goal. The Broncos got the victory with rookie RB Andre Hall getting a 62-yard TD run.

With the win, Denver improved to 5–5.

=== Week 12: at Chicago Bears ===
Quarter	1	2	3	4	OT	Total
Broncos	3	10	14	7	0	34
Bears	3	3	14	14	3	37

at Soldier Field, Chicago, Illinois

- Game time: 4:15 pm EDT
- Game weather: 39 °F (4 °C) (Cloudy with Drizzles & Flurries)
- Game attendance: 62,148
- Referee: Larry Nemmers
- TV announcers (CBS): Greg Gumbel (play-by-play) & Dan Dierdorf (color commentator)

Coming off their home win over the Titans, the Broncos flew to Soldier Field for a Week 12 interconference duel with the Chicago Bears. In the first quarter, Denver trailed early as Bears kicker Robbie Gould managed to get a 24-yard field goal. The Broncos repliedy with kicker Jason Elam getting a 23-yard field goal. In the second quarter, Denver took the lead with rookie RB Andre Hall getting a 16-yard TD run, while Chicago replied with Gould kicking a 44-yard field goal. The Broncos ended the half with Elam kicking a 22-yard field goal.

In the third quarter, Denver lost its lead as WR/KR/PR Devin Hester returned a punt 75 yards for a touchdown. The Broncos answered with FB Cecil Sapp getting a 5-yard TD run, but the Bears immediately struck back as Hester returned a kickoff 88 yards for a touchdown. Denver regained the lead as Cutler completed a 68-yard TD pass to WR Brandon Marshall. In the fourth quarter, the Broncos increased their lead with Cutler completing a 14-yard TD pass to TE Tony Scheffler. However, Chicago tied the game with RB Adrian Peterson getting a 4-yard TD run, while QB Rex Grossman completed a 3-yard TD pass to WR Bernard Berrian. In overtime, the Bears sealed Denver's fate as Gould nailed the game-winning 39-yard field goal.

With the loss, the Broncos fell to 5–6.

=== Week 13: at Oakland Raiders ===
Quarter	1	2	3	4	Total
Broncos	7	0	6	7	20
Raiders	7	7	10	10	34

at McAfee Coliseum Oakland, California

- Game time: 4:05 pm EDT
- Game weather: 60 °F (16 °C) (Cloudy)
- Game attendance: 61,990
- Referee: Gene Steratore
- TV announcers (CBS): Bill Macatee (play-by-play) & Steve Beuerlein (color commentator)

Coming off their embarrassing road loss to the Bears, the Broncos went to home McAfee Coliseum for an AFC West rematch with the Oakland Raiders. In the first quarter, Denver trailed early as QB Josh McCown completed a 15-yard TD pass to WR Tim Dwight. The Broncos replied with RB Travis Henry getting a 4-yard TD run. In the second quarter, Oakland regained the lead with TE Zach Miller for the only score of the period.

In the third quarter, the Raiders continued their domination with kicker Sebastian Janikowski getting a 38-yard field goal, while McCown completed a 13-yard TD pass to WR Jerry Porter. The Broncos continued to try to keep up with kicker Jason Elam getting a 29-yard and a 44-yard field goal. In the fourth quarter, Denver tried to come back as Henry got a 3-yard TD run. However, Oakland sealed the win with Janikowski nailing a 44-yard field goal and RB Justin Fargas getting a 5-yard TD run.

With the loss, the Broncos fell to 5–7.

In the game, Denver committed 4 turnovers (2 interceptions and 2 lost fumbles), which is tied as a season-worst for the Broncos.

=== Week 14: vs. Kansas City Chiefs ===
Quarter	1	2	3	4	Total
Chiefs	0	7	0	0	7
Broncos	14	10	17	0	41

at Invesco Field at Mile High, Denver, Colorado

- Game time: 4:15 pm EST
- Game weather: 21 °F (−6 °C) (Partly Cloudy & Hazy)
- Game attendance: 75,895
- Referee: Jeff Triplette
- TV announcers (CBS): Gus Johnson (play-by-play) and Randy Cross (color commentator)

Trying to snap a two-game skid, the Broncos went home for a Week 14 AFC West rematch with the Kansas City Chiefs. In the first quarter, Denver drew first blood as QB Jay Cutler completed a 21-yard TD pass to WR Brandon Stokley, while RB Travis Henry got a 1-yard TD run. In the second quarter, the Chiefs got their only score of the game with QB Brodie Croyle completing a 15-yard TD pass to TE Tony Gonzalez. Afterwards, the Broncos took over as Cutler completed an 8-yard TD pass to WR Brandon Marshall, while kicker Jason Elam managed to get a 37-yard field goal. In the third quarter, Denver pulled away as Elam nailed another 37-yard field goal, while Cutler completed a 2-yard TD pass to TE Daniel Graham, along with a 13-yard TD pass to Marshall.

With the season-sweeping win, the Broncos improved to 6–7.

Also with this win, it improved Denver's divisional home record since 2001 to 18–4.

=== Week 15: at Houston Texans ===
Quarter	1	2	3	4	Total
Broncos	0	6	7	0	13
Texans	7	3	7	14	31

at Reliant Stadium, Houston, Texas

- Game time: 8:00 pm EDT
- Game weather: 59 °F (15 °C) (Mostly Cloudy)
- Game attendance: 70,747
- Referee: Bill Carollo
- TV announcers (NFL Network): Tom Hammond (play-by-play) & Cris Collinsworth (color commentator)

Coming off their dominating home win over the Chiefs, the Broncos flew to Reliant Stadium for a Thursday night intraconference duel with the Houston Texans. In the first quarter, Denver trailed early as QB Sage Rosenfels got a 5-yard TD run for the only score of the period. In the second quarter, the Broncos got on the board as kicker Jason Elam managed to get a 41-yard field goal. Houston responded with kicker Kris Brown getting a 41-yard field goal. Denver ended the half with Elam nailing a 47-yard field goal.

In the third quarter, the Texans increased their lead as RB Ron Dayne managed to get a 6-yard TD run. The Broncos responded with QB Jay Cutler completing a 12-yard TD pass to TE Tony Scheffler. However, in the fourth quarter, Houston sealed the win as Rosenfels completed a 4-yard TD pass to WR Andre Johnson, while FB Vonta Leach got a 1-yard TD run.

With the loss, Denver fell to 6–8.

=== Week 16: at San Diego Chargers ===
Quarter	1	2	3	4	Total
Broncos	0	0	3	0	3
Chargers	10	6	7	0	23

at Qualcomm Stadium, San Diego, California

- Game time: 6:00 pm. MST/5:00 pm. PST
- Game weather: 62 °F (17 °C) (Clear)
- Game attendance: 65,477
- Referee: John Parry
- TV announcers (ESPN): Mike Tirico (play-by-play), Ron Jaworski (color commentator) and Tony Kornheiser (color commentator)

=== Week 17: vs. Minnesota Vikings ===
Quarter	1	2	3	4	OT	Total
Vikings	0	3	0	16	0	19
Broncos	0	14	3	2	3	22

at Invesco Field at Mile High, Denver, Colorado

- Game time: 4:15 pm. EST/3:15 pm. CST
- Game weather: 36 °F (2 °C) (partly cloudy)
- Game attendance: 76,084
- Referee: Jerome Boger
- TV announcers (Fox): Sam Rosen (play-by-play), Tim Ryan (color commentary)
