= Brandon Stokley =

American football player and radio personality (born 1976)

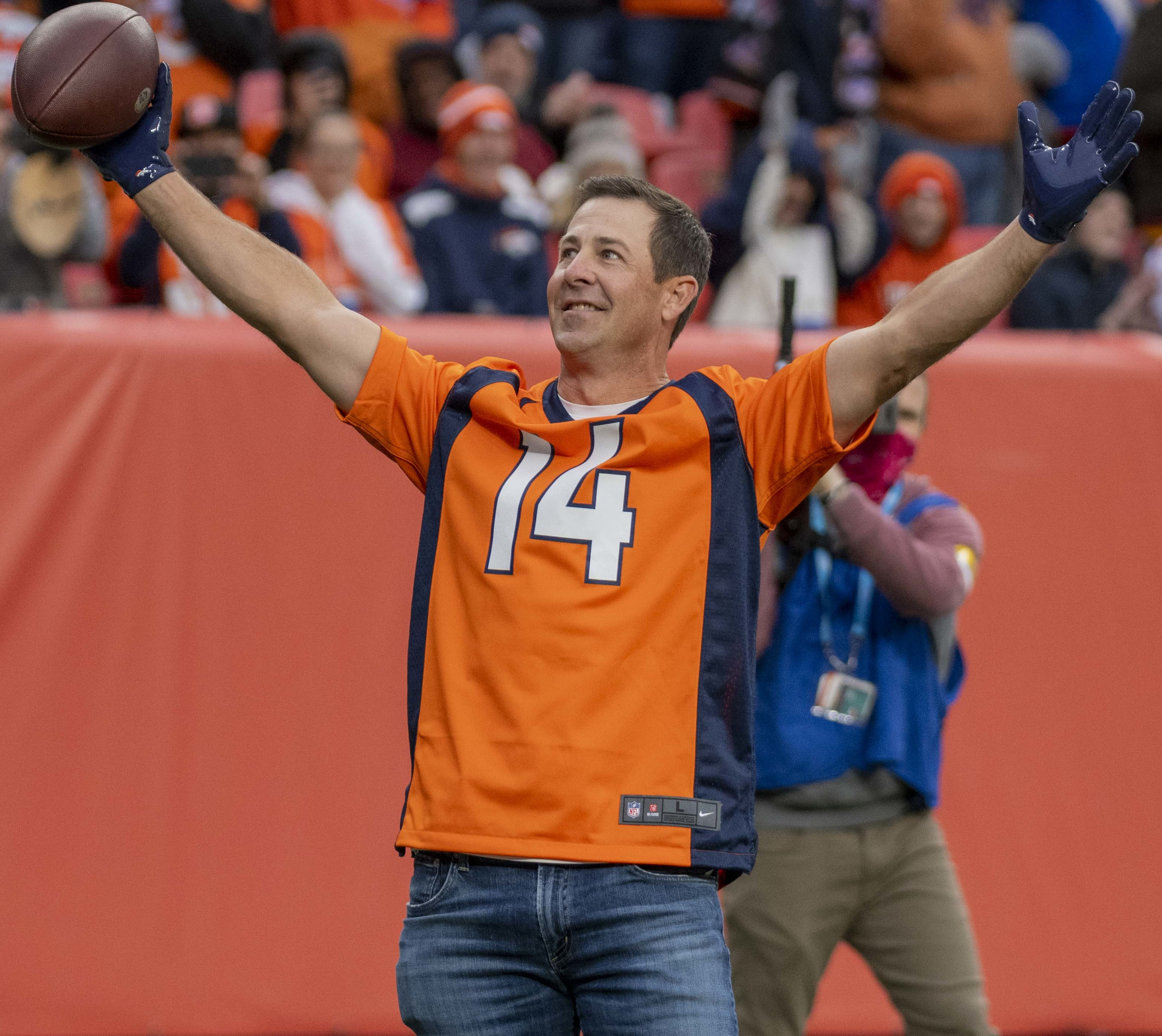
- Stokley at Mile High Stadium in 2021

No. 14, 80, 83, 15, 84
- Position: Wide receiver

Personal information
- Born: June 23, 1976 (age 50); Blacksburg, Virginia, U.S.
- Listed height: 6 ft 0 in (1.83 m)
- Listed weight: 194 lb (88 kg)

Career information
- High school: Ovey Comeaux (Lafayette, Louisiana)
- College: Louisiana–Lafayette (1994–1998)
- NFL draft: 1999: 4th round, 105th overall pick

Career history
- Baltimore Ravens (1999−2002); Indianapolis Colts (2003−2006); Denver Broncos (2007−2009); Seattle Seahawks (2010); New York Giants (2011); Denver Broncos (2012); Baltimore Ravens (2013)

Awards and highlights
- 2× Super Bowl champion (XXXV, XLI)

Career NFL statistics
- Receptions: 397
- Receiving yards: 5,339
- Receiving touchdowns: 39
- Stats at Pro Football Reference

Brandon Ray Stokley (born June 23, 1976) is an American former professional football player who was a wide receiver in the National Football League (NFL) for fifteen seasons. Nicknamed "The Slot Machine," Stokley played college football for the Louisiana Ragin' Cajuns and was selected by the Baltimore Ravens in the fourth round of the 1999 NFL draft.

Stokley also played for the Indianapolis Colts, Seattle Seahawks, New York Giants, and Denver Broncos, earning two Super Bowl wins during his playing career. After retiring from the NFL, he became a radio personality.

== Personal life ==
His father, Nelson Stokley, played college football at LSU and was the head coach of the Louisiana–Lafayette Ragin' Cajuns from 1986 to 1998. Brandon played wide receiver under his father from 1994 to 1997, with Jake Delhomme as quarterback through the 1996 season.

While in college, Stokley met his future wife, Lana, a two-time All-American left fielder in softball who led Southwestern Louisiana to two College World Series. The couple has two sons.

== Early life ==
Stokley attended Ovey Comeaux High School (Lafayette, Louisiana) and was a letterman in football, basketball, and baseball. In football, Stokley won All-District 3-A honors, All-Parish honors, All-Acadiana honors, and All-State Class 5-A honors. In basketball, Stokley averaged 14 points a game and won All-District honors. In baseball, he won All-District honors.

== College career ==
Brandon Stokley was a four-year letterman for the Ragin’ Cajun football team from 1995 to 1998. During his career as a wide receiver, Stokley had three 1,000+ yard seasons and was the first player in NCAA Division I-A to average 100 yards per game over a four-year career.

Stokley is the all-time UL Lafayette leader in passes caught at 241, reception yardage at 3,702 and touchdown receptions with 25.

== Professional career ==
Pre-draft measurables
Height	Weight	40-yard dash	10-yard split	20-yard split	20-yard shuttle	Three-cone drill	Vertical jump	Broad jump
5 ft 11 1/2 in (1.82 m)	197 lb (89 kg)	4.54 s	1.56 s	2.63 s	4.01 s	7.00 s	35.5 in (0.90 m)	9 ft 10 in (3.00 m)
All values from NFL Combine

=== Baltimore Ravens (first stint) ===
Stokley was drafted by the Baltimore Ravens out of the University of Louisiana at Lafayette, then named the University of Southwestern Louisiana, in the fourth round (105th pick overall) of the 1999 NFL draft. Stokley won a championship ring in Super Bowl XXXV (2000) as a member of the Ravens. In the game, he caught 3 passes for 52 yards, including the first touchdown of the game—a 38-yard touchdown reception in the first quarter.

=== Indianapolis Colts ===
In 2003, Stokley signed with the Indianapolis Colts. On December 26, 2004, Stokley received the record-breaking 21-yard touchdown pass for Peyton Manning in the hunt to break Dan Marino's record of 48 touchdown passes in a season. That year, he had a breakout season with 68 passes caught for 1,077 yards and 10 touchdowns and an average of 15.8 yards per catch. Furthermore, the TD catch made the 2004 Colts the first NFL team to have three WRs with 1,000 receiving yards and 10 touchdowns or more in a season, the other two being Reggie Wayne and Marvin Harrison. The next two seasons of Stokley's career were marred by various injuries. After he participated in only four games of the 2006 season, the Colts terminated his contract on March 1, 2007. Stokley earned his second Super Bowl ring after the Colts won Super Bowl XLI (2007) against the Chicago Bears, even though he wasn't able to play in the game due to injury.

=== Denver Broncos (first stint) ===
On March 14, 2007, Stokley signed with the Denver Broncos. On December 7, 2007, he signed a 3-year extension with the team.

In a memorable play from the Broncos' 2009 season opener against the Cincinnati Bengals, Stokley caught a pass from Kyle Orton intended for Brandon Marshall that was tipped by Cincinnati's Leon Hall, and took it 87 yards into the end zone for the winning score. As he reached the 5-yard line, he abruptly changed direction and ran parallel to the goal line, running an additional six seconds off the clock, only crossing into the end zone once he reached the opposite side of the field. This ensured a win for the Broncos, who were trailing 7–6 with 28 seconds left before Stokley's touchdown reception. Stokley attributed the clock-burning run to having done so in video games "probably hundreds of times", and it can be seen in the introduction of Madden NFL 11. Play-by-play commentator Gus Johnson's call of the score is also considered one of the announcer's greatest. Later that season, in week 16 against the Philadelphia Eagles, he was ejected from the game after slapping back judge Todd Prukop's hand in retaliation for a no pass interference call. He was fined $25,000 for his actions.

On September 4, 2010, Stokley was released by the Broncos.

=== Seattle Seahawks ===
On September 28, 2010, Stokley signed with the Seattle Seahawks. His most notable contribution in Seattle came in the 2010 NFL Playoffs against the New Orleans Saints and the Chicago Bears. In those games, Stokley was the leading receiver for Seattle, catching four passes for 73 yards and a touchdown against New Orleans and 8 catches for 86 yards and a touchdown against Chicago. His performance was one of the keys to the 7-9 Seahawks' surprise upset of the defending Super Bowl champion New Orleans Saints. He was later cut by the Seahawks after the 2011 lockout ended. During free agency he expressed interest in the Washington Redskins but never signed with them.

=== New York Giants ===
On September 15, 2011, Stokley signed with the New York Giants. After catching 1 pass in two games, he was released by the team with an injury settlement on October 4. The Giants went on to win Super Bowl XLVI at the end of the season, but since Stokley was no longer on the team, he was not awarded a Super Bowl ring.

=== Denver Broncos (second stint) ===
On April 16, 2012, Stokley agreed to a one-year contract to return to the Denver Broncos, reuniting him with his former quarterback, Peyton Manning. As a member of the team's leadership council, Stokley went on to have one of his most productive seasons in several years, ending the year with 45 receptions, 544 receiving yards, and 5 touchdowns.

=== Baltimore Ravens (second stint) ===
On August 10, 2013, Stokley agreed to terms with the defending champion Baltimore Ravens, reuniting him with the team that drafted him in 1999. On August 11, Stokley officially signed a one-year deal with the Ravens. On October 5, the Ravens cut Stokley, and on October 8, the Ravens re-signed Stokley. Stokley suffered a concussion in a Week 14 victory over the Minnesota Vikings and was subsequently placed on injured reserve, ending his season. On December 26, Stokley announced his decision to retire from professional football after the season.

== NFL career statistics ==
Legend
	Won the Super Bowl
**Bold**	Career high

=== Regular season ===
Year	Team	Games		Receiving					Fumbles	
Year	Team	GP	GS	Rec	Yds	Avg	Lng	TD	Fum	Lost
1999	BAL	2	0	1	28	**28.0**	28	1	0	0
2000	BAL	7	1	11	184	16.7	32	2	0	0
2001	BAL	16	5	24	344	14.3	46	2	**1**	0
2002	BAL	8	5	24	357	14.9	35	2	**1**	**1**
2003	IND	6	3	22	211	9.6	37	3	0	0
2004	IND	16	3	**68**	**1,077**	15.8	69	**10**	**1**	**1**
2005	IND	15	4	41	543	13.2	45	1	0	0
2006	IND	4	1	8	85	10.6	23	1	0	0
2007	DEN	13	9	40	635	15.9	58	5	0	0
2008	DEN	15	2	49	528	10.8	36	3	0	0
2009	DEN	16	2	19	327	17.2	**87**	4	0	0
2010	SEA	11	0	31	354	11.4	36	0	0	0
2011	NYG	2	0	1	7	7.0	7	0	0	0
2012	DEN	15	9	45	544	12.1	38	5	0	0
2013	BAL	6	0	13	115	8.8	18	0	0	0
Career		152	44	397	5,339	13.4	87	39	3	2

=== Playoffs ===
Year	Team	Games		Receiving					Fumbles	
Year	Team	GP	GS	Rec	Yds	Avg	Lng	TD	Fum	Lost
2000	BAL	4	1	7	91	13.0	38	1	0	0
2001	BAL	2	0	2	38	19.0	27	0	0	0
2003	IND	3	0	11	**223**	**20.3**	**87**	**3**	0	0
2004	IND	2	0	10	97	9.7	21	0	0	0
2005	IND	1	0	1	13	13.0	13	0	0	0
2006	IND	0	0	Did not play due to injury						
2010	SEA	2	2	**12**	158	13.2	45	2	0	0
2012	DEN	1	1	3	27	9.0	15	1	0	0
Career		15	4	46	647	14.1	87	7	0	0

== Radio career ==
After his playing career ended, he went into sports radio. He co-hosts with Mike Evans & Mark Schlereth weekdays from 6am to 10am MST on 104.3 The Fan, a radio station in Denver.
