= Selvin Young =

American football player (born 1983)

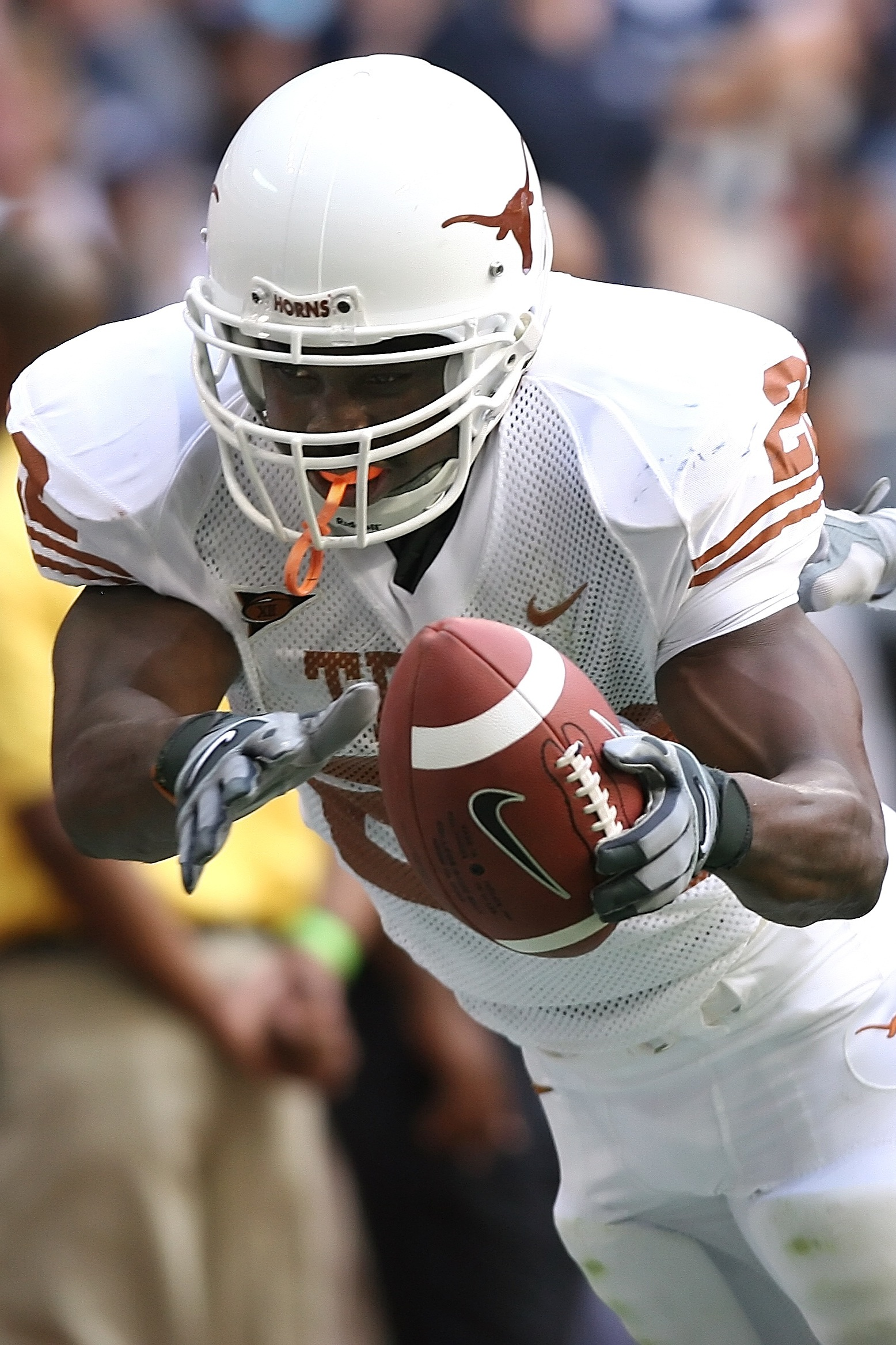
- Young with the Texas Longhorns in 2006

No. 35
- Position: Running back

Personal information
- Born: October 1, 1983 (age 43); Houston, Texas, U.S.
- Listed height: 5 ft 11 in (1.80 m)
- Listed weight: 215 lb (98 kg)

Career information
- High school: Jersey Village (Houston)
- College: Texas
- NFL draft: 2007: undrafted

Career history
- Denver Broncos (2007–2008)

Awards and highlights
- BCS national champion (2005)

Career NFL statistics
- Rushing attempts: 201
- Rushing yards: 1,032
- Receptions: 38
- Receiving yards: 247
- Total touchdowns: 2
- Stats at Pro Football Reference

Selvin Young (born October 1, 1983) is an American former professional football player who was a running back for the Denver Broncos of the National Football League (NFL). He played college football for the Texas Longhorns and played two seasons with the Broncos in the NFL from 2007 to 2008.

== Early life ==
A three-year starter at Jersey Village High School in Houston, Texas, Young was rated as a four-star recruit, as well as the fifth best running back in the recruiting class. He signed with the University of Texas at Austin over offers from University of Oklahoma and University of Colorado.

== College career ==
As a freshman in 2002 at the University of Texas, Young returned punts and was the backup for Cedric Benson. The following year, he primarily served as the kick returner and the punt returner. As a junior, Young suffered a season-ending ankle injury during the second game of the season at the University of Arkansas. A medical redshirt was granted for the season by the NCAA. In 2005, Young was the starter for five games, including the national championship game against the University of Southern California, where he rushed for 45 yards and a touchdown, and set the key block on the famous "fourth-and-five" game-winning touchdown. He finished the season with 461 yards and 8 touchdowns. As a redshirt senior in 2006, Young was the starter for 11 of the 12 games, in a season which culminated with a 10–3 record and a win at the 2006 Alamo Bowl. He finished his career at the University of Texas with 3,060 all purpose yards and 29 touchdowns, which includes 1,713 rushing yards and 25 rushing touchdowns. In December 2006, Young graduated with a degree in liberal arts.

== Professional career ==
Pre-draft measurables
Height	Weight	40-yard dash
5 ft 11 in (1.80 m)	207 lb (94 kg)	4.58 s
All values from NFL Combine.

Young was not selected in the draft. As an undrafted free agent, he signed a free agent contract with the Denver Broncos on May 1, 2007. After impressive performances in the team's exhibition games, head coach Mike Shanahan named Young the #2 running back, behind starter Travis Henry. In Young's first ever start, he notched 120 total yards from scrimmage against the Green Bay Packers, filling in for an injured Henry. He also saw playing time as a kick-off returner.

Young recorded his first career 100-yard rushing game and first career rushing touchdown on November 11, 2007, in an away game against the Kansas City Chiefs. He rushed for 109 yards on 20 attempts. His touchdown run was a 20-yarder in the third quarter of the game. The Broncos won, 27–11, which was their first victory at Arrowhead Stadium since 2002. His two best games of the 2007 season were against the Kansas City Chiefs, when he rushed for over 100 yards and over 5 yards a carry in both contests. Both games were coincidentally the only 100 yard games he had in the 2007 season.

Young finished the 2007 season playing 15 games (8 starts), with 729 rushing yards on 140 attempts (5.2 rushing average) and 1 rushing touchdown. He was the Broncos leading rusher that year.

Young was the opening day starter in 2008, but an injured groin kept him out of 7 or 8 games between weeks 6 and 14. He returned for two more games but suffered what proved to be a career-ending neck injury in the 2nd to last game of the season.

On April 30, 2009, Young was waived by the Broncos.
