= 2005 Hawaii Bowl =

2005 Sheraton Hawaii Bowl
Nevada Wolf Pack	UCF Golden Knights
(8–3)	(8–4)
WAC	C-USA
49	48
Head coach: Chris Ault	Head coach: George O'Leary
	1	2	3	4	OT	Total
Nevada	7	21	0	14	7	49
UCF	17	3	10	12	6	48
- Date: December 24, 2005
- Season: 2005
- Stadium: Aloha Stadium
- Location: Halawa, Hawaii
- MVP: WR Brandon Marshall (UCF); RB B.J. Mitchell (Nevada)
- Referee: Scott Novak (MW)
- Attendance: 26,254 (tickets sold); 16,134 (turnstile)
- Payout: US$750,000 per team

United States TV coverage
- Network: ESPN
- Announcers: Dave Barnett, Craig James and Suzy Shuster

The 2005 Sheraton Hawaii Bowl matched the UCF Golden Knights against the Nevada Wolf Pack. The fourth edition of the Hawaii Bowl was held in Halawa, Hawaii and featured WAC champions Nevada versus Conference USA runner–up UCF. The game was sponsored by Sheraton Hotels and Resorts and was played on Christmas Eve.

UCF was one of the nation's best stories of the season. They had gone 0–11 the previous season and after starting the 2005 season 0–2, were riding a 17–game losing streak. They then accomplished one of the biggest turnarounds in NCAA Division I-A history, as they won eight of their next nine games to reach the C-USA championship game. With a 7–1 conference record (8–3 overall), UCF lost to Tulsa to fall to 8–4. They were invited to the Hawaii Bowl, the program's first ever bowl appearance. It would be UCF's second visit to Hawaii. The Knights had faced the Rainbow Warriors back in 1995 as a Division I-AA team.

Nevada finished as Co-WAC Champions, winning seven out of their last eight games. Their only loss during that stretch was to Boise State. This was the Wolf Pack's first bowl appearance since the 1996 Las Vegas Bowl.

The game turned into a high–scoring shootout with Nevada alone racking up 623 yards of offense. UCF running back Kevin Smith rushed for 202 yards and three touchdowns, while wide receiver Brandon Marshall caught 11 passes for 212 yards and three touchdowns. Trailing late in the game by ten points, UCF rallied to tie the score 42–42 and force overtime. Nevada scored a touchdown and extra point on their first overtime possession to take a 7–point lead. UCF scored a touchdown, but kicker Matt Prater, who would go on to kick an NFL-record 64-yard field goal on December 8, 2013, as a member of the Denver Broncos, missed the 60-foot extra point, sealing the victory for Nevada.

== Game summary ==
=== First quarter ===
UCF jumped out to a quick 14–0 lead in the first quarter. On their first drive, quarterback Steven Moffett drove the Golden Knights 78 yards in only four plays for their first score. After an 18-yard run by Kevin Smith, Moffett threw a 51–yard touchdown pass to Brandon Marshall. Their second drive took only two plays. Kevin Smith took a hand–off and broke away for a 78–yard touchdown run. Just six minutes into the game, the Golden Knights were up by 14.

Robert Hubbard got Nevada on the board with a 4–yard touchdown run. It came after a 59–yard run by Mitchell and cut the lead to 14–7. Late in the first quarter, UCF quarterback Steven Moffett fumbled away the ball on a quarterback keeper at his own 27 yard line, but the call on the field was overturned after review. The Golden Knights maintained possession and drove into Nevada territory. UCF kicker Matt Prater capped off the 11–play drive with a 47–yard field goal and a 17–7 lead at the end of the first quarter.

=== Second quarter ===
In part due to UCF miscues, Nevada took control of the game during the second quarter. Running back B.J. Mitchell scored twice on two 1–yard touchdown runs for Nevada to take the lead 21–17. The first score came after UCF kicker Matt Prater missed a 40–yard field goal attempt (off a wobbly snap). Robert Hubbard then blasted for a 49–yard run to the UCF 1 yard line, setting up Mitchell's first touchdown. The next Nevada score came after UCF punter Aaron Horne shanked a punt deep in their own territory. The punt went only 14 yards, setting Nevada up at the UCF 35 yard line. Nevada went the 35 yards in five plays, with Hubbard second touchdown run.

Late in the second quarter, Nevada extended their lead, going 78 yards in only three plays and just over one minute. Jeff Rowe threw a 54–yard pass to Nichiren Flowers, then Hubbard broke away for another long run, this time a 24–yard touchdown rush to make the score 28–17. UCF drove to the Nevada 16 yard line in the final minute and Matt Prater kicked a 38–yard field goal. Nevada led 28–20 at halftime.

=== Third quarter ===
Early in the third quarter, Steven Moffett fired a 29–yard touchdown pass to Brandon Marshall. The drive was aided by a pass interference call on Nevada which advanced the Golden Knights to the Nevada 30 yard line. The ensuing two-point conversion failed and Nevada still led 28–26. With just under two minutes to go in the third quarter, Kevin Smith scored on a 3–yard touchdown run to give UCF a 32–28 lead. UCF again tried for two points, but once more failed.

=== Fourth quarter ===
In the fourth quarter, Robert Hubbard scored a 5–yard touchdown run, after a lengthy clock–burning drive to give Nevada a 35–32 lead. With 3:18 to go in the game, quarterback Jeff Rowe threw a 7-yard touchdown pass to wide receiver Travis Branzell to extend the Nevada lead to 42–32.

On UCF's next possession, they failed to reach the endzone and settled a long field goal attempt. Matt Prater nailed a 46–yard field goal to cut the lead to 42–35 with just 1:35 left in regulation. The ensuing onside kick was recovered by UCF at the 48 yard line and they took advantage of it. Steven Moffett connected with Brandon Marshall for a 27–yard gain all the way to the Nevada 21 yard line. Three plays later with 55 seconds left, Moffett found Marshall open on a slant inside the 5 yard line and Marshall leaped to the endzone for a 16–yard touchdown pass. Prater's extra point tied the game 42–42 and sent the game to overtime.

=== Overtime ===
In overtime, UCF won the coin toss and elected to defer. Jeff Rowe scored on a 4–yard touchdown run to make the lead 49–42 in favor of Nevada. Kevin Smith answered with a 19–yard touchdown run for UCF, but Matt Prater missed the extra point and Nevada escaped with a 49–48 win.

== Scoring summary ==
Scoring summary

Quarter	Time	Drive			Team	Scoring information	Score	
Quarter	Time	Plays	Yards	TOP	Team	Scoring information	NEV	UCF
1	13:20	4	78	1:40	UCF	Brandon Marshall 51-yard touchdown reception from Steven Moffett, Matt Prater kick good	0	7
1	9:24	2	80	0:49	UCF	Kevin Smith 78-yard touchdown run, Matt Prater kick good	0	14
1	8:33	4	80	0:51	NEV	Robert Hubbard 4-yard touchdown run, Brett Jaekle kick good	7	14
1	4:08	11	51	4:25	UCF	47-yard field goal by Matt Prater	7	17
2	11:32	5	77	1:49	NEV	B.J. Mitchell 1-yard touchdown run, Brett Jaekle kick good	14	17
2	7:37	5	35	1:45	NEV	B.J. Mitchell 1-yard touchdown run, Brett Jaekle kick good	21	17
2	5:01	3	82	1:05	NEV	Robert Hubbard 24-yard touchdown run, Brett Jaekle kick good	28	17
2	0:56	12	57	4:05	UCF	38-yard field goal by Matt Prater	28	20
3	8:19	8	75	3:19	UCF	Brandon Marshall 29-yard touchdown reception from Steven Moffett, 2-point pass failed	28	26
3	1:51	6	74	2:31	UCF	Kevin Smith 3-yard touchdown run, 2-point pass failed	28	32
4	13:02	10	80	3:49	NEV	Robert Hubbard 5-yard touchdown run, Brett Jaekle kick good	35	32
4	3:18	7	64	3:04	NEV	Travis Branzell 7-yard touchdown reception from Jeff Rowe, Brett Jaekle kick good	42	32
4	1:32	11	47	1:46	UCF	46-yard field goal by Matt Prater	42	35
4	0:55	4	48	0:37	UCF	Brandon Marshall 16-yard touchdown reception from Steven Moffett, Matt Prater kick good	42	42
OT		5	25		NEV	Jeff Rowe 4-yard touchdown run, Brett Jaekle kick good	49	42
OT		2	25		UCF	Kevin Smith 19-yard touchdown run, Matt Prater kick failed	49	48
"TOP" = time of possession. For other American football terms, see Glossary of American football.							49	48

== Attendance ==
The official attendance of 16,134 set a low mark among post-season FBS bowl games, which stood until the 2014 Bahamas Bowl. UCF in particular saw very few fans make the trip from Orlando. The school only brought 253 people in their travel party and as few as 380 fans bought game ticket packages. Very few players had family members in attendance and the school's marching band did not make the trip. The especially long distance (nearly 5,000 miles), costly airline tickets and expensive hotel rates during the busy holiday season were the primary reason cited.
