= Tony Scheffler =

American football player (born 1983)

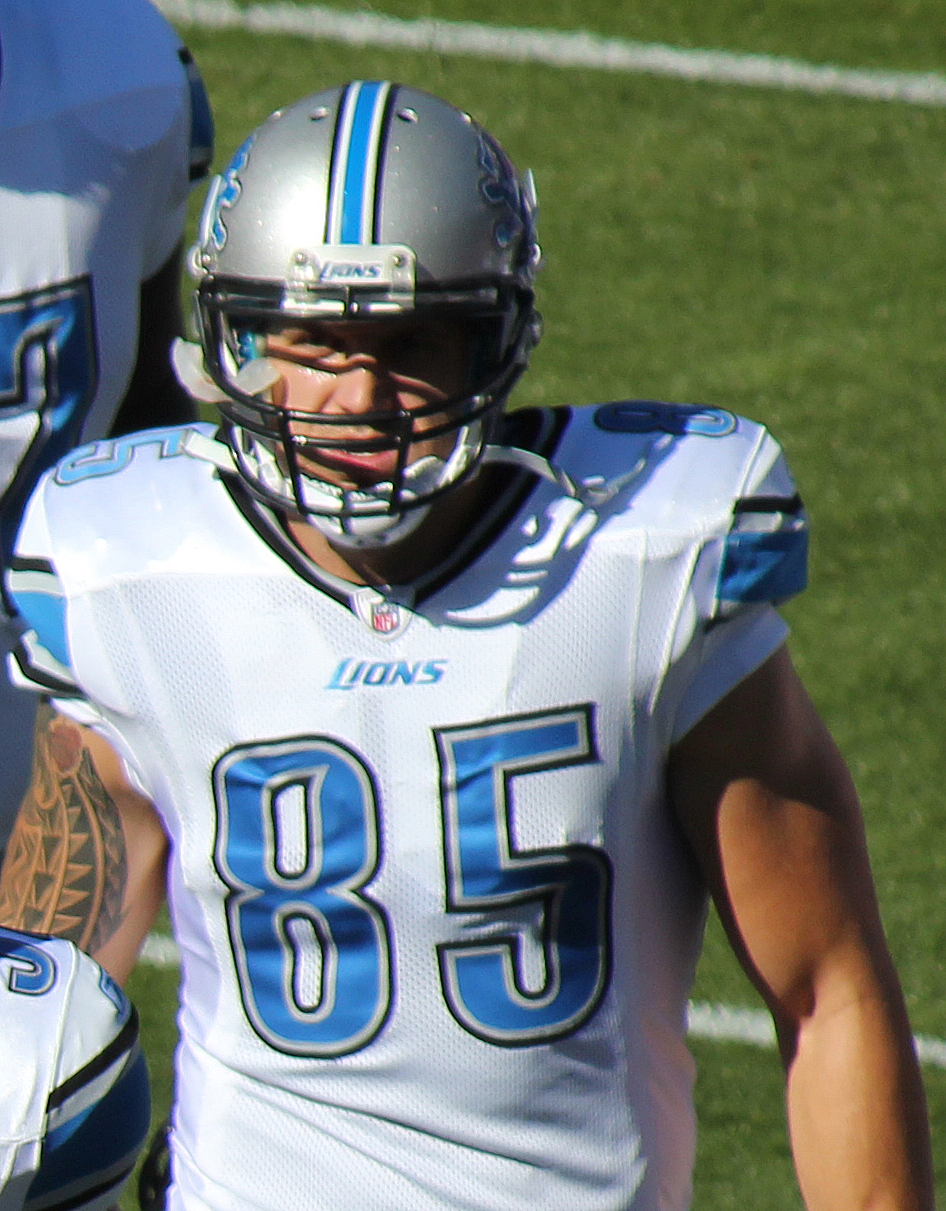
- Scheffler with the Detroit Lions in 2011

No. 88, 85
- Position: Tight end

Personal information
- Born: February 15, 1983 (age 43); Morenci, Michigan, U.S.
- Listed height: 6 ft 5 in (1.96 m)
- Listed weight: 255 lb (116 kg)

Career information
- High school: Chelsea (Chelsea, Michigan)
- College: Western Michigan (2001–2005)
- NFL draft: 2006: 2nd round, 61st overall pick

Career history
- Denver Broncos (2006–2009); Detroit Lions (2010–2013)

Career NFL statistics
- Receptions: 258
- Receiving yards: 3,207
- Receiving touchdowns: 22
- Stats at Pro Football Reference

Tony Scheffler (born February 15, 1983) is an American former professional football player who was a tight end in the National Football League (NFL). He played college football and baseball for the Western Michigan Broncos. He was selected by the Denver Broncos in the second round of the 2006 NFL draft.

Scheffler also played for the Detroit Lions during his NFL career.

== Early life ==
Scheffler played at Chelsea High School in Chelsea, Michigan, where he played high school football. He set a school record for receiving yards in a season with 1,340 and finished the 2000 season with 67 receptions and 16 touchdowns playing wide receiver. He committed to play college football and baseball at Western Michigan University

== College career ==
Scheffler attended Western Michigan University and had 117 receptions and 1,345 receiving yards with 13 touchdowns in his career. He finished his career ranked second among tight ends in both receptions and receiving yards in school history. He was also a two-time first team all-Mid-American Conference selection, and as a senior placed fourth in voting for the John Mackey Award as the nation's best tight end, posting a career-high 57 receptions for 670 yards (11.8 avg.) with nine touchdowns.

== Professional career ==
Pre-draft measurables
Height	Weight	Arm length	Hand span	40-yard dash	10-yard split	20-yard split	20-yard shuttle	Three-cone drill	Vertical jump	Broad jump	Bench press
6 ft 5 3/8 in (1.97 m)	254 lb (115 kg)	33 1/4 in (0.84 m)	9 1/8 in (0.23 m)	4.60 s	1.64 s	2.71 s	4.01 s	6.81 s	33.5 in (0.85 m)	9 ft 7 in (2.92 m)	17 reps
All values from NFL Combine

=== Denver Broncos ===
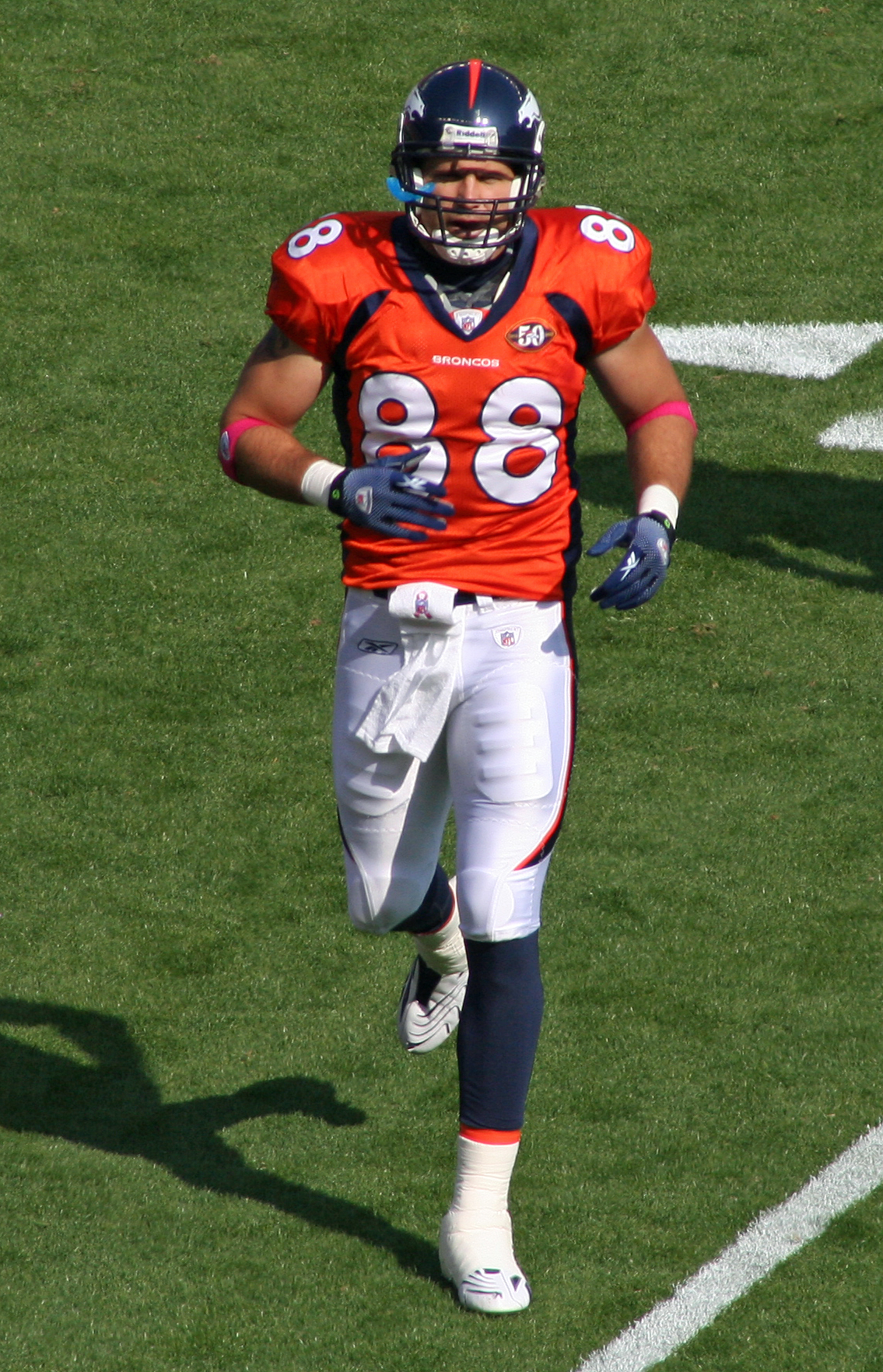
Scheffler while a member of the Denver Broncos in 2009

Scheffler was selected by the Denver Broncos in the second round of the 2006 NFL draft. After seeing limited playing time early in the season, Scheffler saw increased playing time and production after Jay Cutler was inserted as the Broncos starting quarterback on December 3, 2006, against the Seattle Seahawks. In a game against the San Diego Chargers on December 10, Scheffler caught his first NFL touchdown from a pass by Cutler. After the following kickoff was fumbled, Scheffler caught another touchdown, 48 seconds after his previous one.

On May 19, 2007, Scheffler broke his left foot in seven-on-seven passing drills during practice. The injury caused Scheffler to miss much of training camp, the setback kept Scheffler out of his place in the lineup as the Broncos pass receiving tight end until October 21, 2007, against the Pittsburgh Steelers. Scheffler finished the season among league leaders of tight ends with 49 receptions for 549 yards and five touchdowns.

Following the 2007 season, Scheffler, Cutler and Marshall went to Atlanta together to train and work on timing for the 2008 season.

On April 14, 2010, Scheffler was re-signed to a one-year contract.

=== Detroit Lions ===
On April 19, 2010, Scheffler was traded to the Detroit Lions in a three-team trade involving the Philadelphia Eagles. The Eagles received linebacker Ernie Sims, and the Broncos got the Eagles fifth-round draft pick for 2010 (137th overall). The Lions also received Denver's seventh-round draft pick for 2010.

On October 22, 2013, Scheffler was released by the Lions after suffering his third concussion in four years earlier in the month.

On June 11, 2014, Scheffler announced his retirement, citing the concussions he sustained as a key reason. He signed three contracts during his career and subsequently earned $12,194,000 in his eight-year career in the NFL.

== Personal life ==
After his retirement, Scheffler became a real estate agent in Chelsea, MI, volunteered as a coach for the Chelsea High School football team, and purchased a ranch in Texas to raise Texas Longhorns.

On September 28, 2013, Scheffler competed in a 2 on 1 basketball game vs Dave Portnoy and Dan "Big Cat" Katz of Barstool Sports. Despite Scheffler having a big lead the entire game, Portnoy's hot shooting earned the Barstool bloggers a comeback 11–10 victory. After the loss, an irate Scheffler refused to shake hands and punted the basketball into a dense forest. On August 23, 2023, Scheffler appeared on Big Cat's podcast, Pardon My Take, and aired his frustration with the continual discussion of this basketball game. They made plans for another event which has yet to be announced.

In 2020 he became coach of the Chelsea High School girls varsity basketball team. He was named a district coach of the year in 2023, and resigned in 2024.

== NFL career statistics ==
Legend
**Bold**	Career high

=== Regular season ===
Year	Team	Games		Receiving					
Year	Team	GP	GS	Tgt	Rec	Yds	Avg	Lng	TD
2006	DEN	13	5	37	18	286	15.9	29	4
2007	DEN	**16**	7	65	**49**	549	11.2	41	5
2008	DEN	13	7	61	40	**645**	**16.1**	**72**	3
2009	DEN	15	**9**	50	31	416	13.4	52	2
2010	DET	15	4	72	45	378	8.4	25	1
2011	DET	15	5	43	26	347	13.3	36	**6**
2012	DET	15	4	**85**	42	504	12.0	57	1
2013	DET	5	1	12	7	82	11.7	22	0
		107	42	425	258	3,207	12.4	72	22

=== Playoffs ===
Year	Team	Games		Receiving					
Year	Team	GP	GS	Tgt	Rec	Yds	Avg	Lng	TD
2011	DET	**1**	**1**	**3**	**1**	**7**	**7.0**	**7**	0
		1	1	3	1	7	7.0	7	0
